= Blockbuster (retailer) =

American video rental corporation (1985–2020)

Blockbuster, LLC
- Current logo, used since 1996

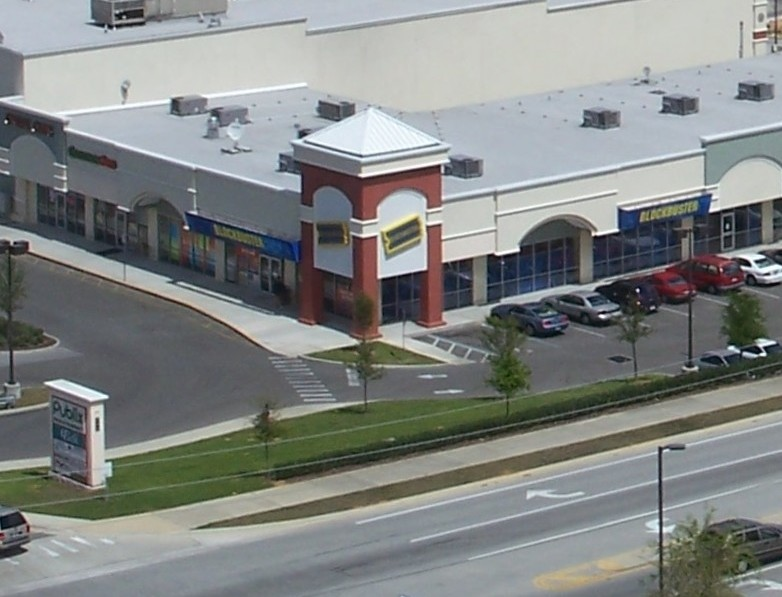
- A Blockbuster location in March 2007 in Clermont, Florida, as seen from the Citrus Tower
- Formerly: Blockbuster, Inc. (1985–2010)
- Type: Subsidiary
- Founded: October 19, 1985 (41 years ago); Dallas, Texas, U.S.
- Founder: David Cook
- Defunct: January 12, 2014; 12 years ago (last corporate-owned stores); January 31, 2020; 6 years ago (last international retail stores)
- Fate: Chapter 7 bankruptcy liquidation sale; brand still licensed in Denmark by TDC Holding A/S
- Successor: Sling TV; Dish Movie Pack
- Headquarters: Dallas, Texas, U.S.
- Number of locations: 1 (privately owned, franchised) in Bend, Oregon (Note: Down from 9,094 in 2004)
- Services: Home video rentals (VHS, Betamax, LaserDisc, DVD, Ultra HD Blu-ray, Blu-ray); Video on demand streaming services
- Revenue: ▼US$3.24 billion (2010)
- Operating income: ▼ −US$78.8 million (2010)
- Net income: ▲ −US$268 million (2010)
- Total assets: ▼US$1.183 billion (2010)
- Total equity: ▼ −US$582.3 million (2010)
- Number of employees: 84,300 (2004); 25,000 (2010)
- Parent: Viacom (1994–2004); Dish Network (2011–2020)
- Website: blockbuster.com

Blockbuster or Blockbuster Video is an American multimedia brand which was founded by David Cook in 1985 as a single home video rental shop, but later became a public store chain featuring video game rentals, DVD-by-mail, streaming, video on demand, and cinema theater. The company expanded internationally throughout the 1990s. At its peak in 2004, Blockbuster employed 84,300 people worldwide and operated 9,094 stores.

Poor leadership and the impact of the Great Recession were major factors leading to Blockbuster's decline, as was the growing competition from Netflix's mail-order service, video on demand (including the Netflix streaming service), and Redbox automated kiosks. Significant loss of revenue occurred during the late 2000s, and the company filed for bankruptcy protection in 2010. The next year, its remaining 1,700 stores were bought by satellite television provider Dish Network; by 2014, the last 300 company-owned stores were closed.

Although corporate support for the brand ended, Dish retained a small number of franchise agreements, enabling some privately owned franchises to remain open. Following a series of further closures in 2019, only one franchised store remains open, located in Bend, Oregon. As of 2025, the corporation that owned Blockbuster before Dish remains in existence as a shell company under the name BB Liquidating, Inc., which gained notoriety in the GameStop short squeeze in 2021.

== History ==
=== 1985–1996: Founding and early growth ===
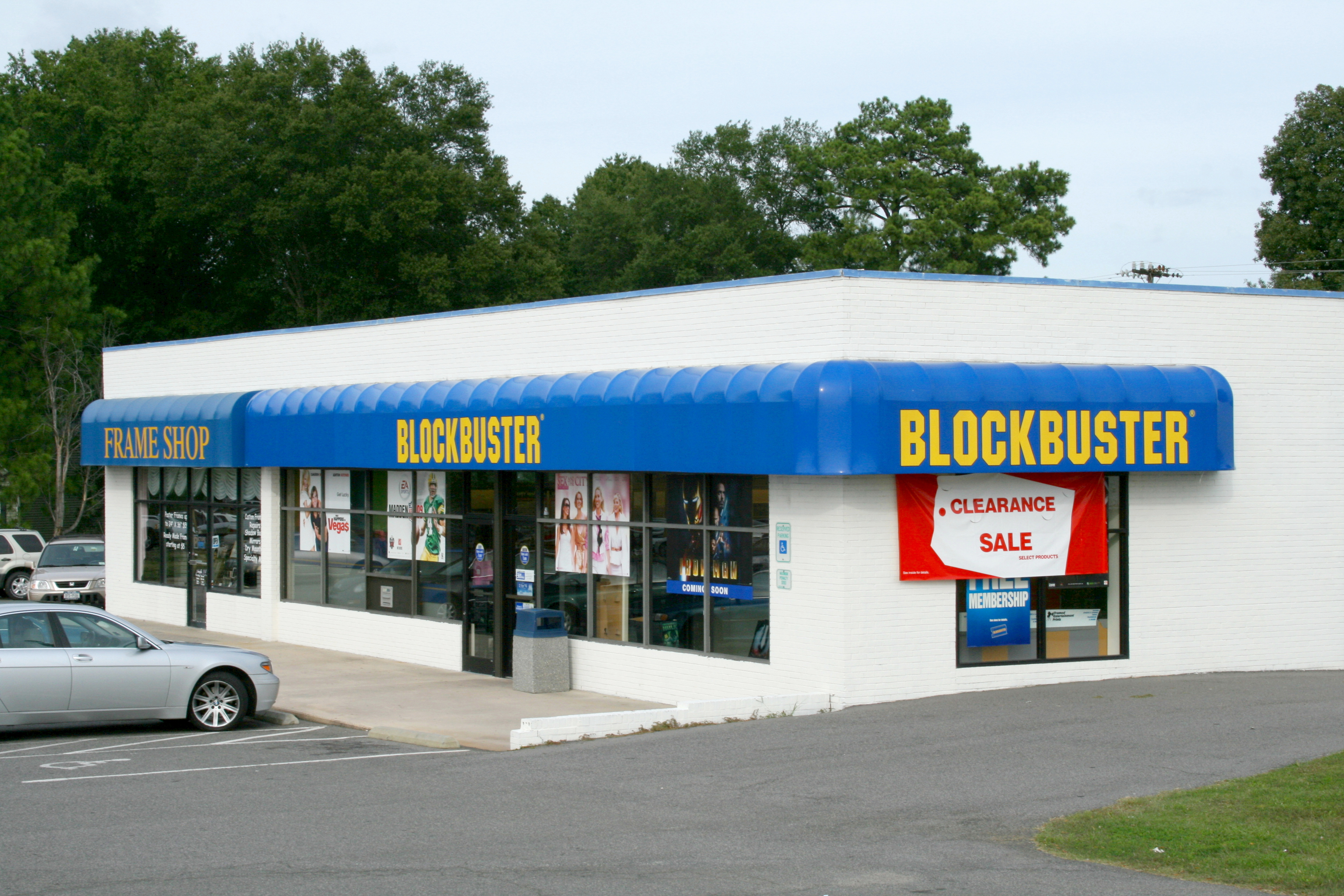
A Blockbuster store in Durham, North Carolina

Blockbuster's beginnings can be traced back to another company, Cook Data Services, founded by David Cook in 1978. The company's primary goal was to supply software services to the oil and gas industries throughout Texas, but it was very unsuccessful. Sandy Cook, David's wife, wanted to get into the video business, and her husband would soon study the industry and future prospects. Using profit he made from the sale of David P. Cook & Associates, the subsidiary of his company, he decided to buy into a video store franchise in Dallas known as Video Works. When Video Works would not allow him to decorate the interior of his store with a blue-and-yellow design, he departed the franchise and opened the first Blockbuster Video in 1985 under his own company Blockbuster Video Inc. When he realized the potential in video rentals, Cook abandoned the oil industry and began franchising the Blockbuster store.

The first Blockbuster store opened on October 19, 1985, in Dallas, Texas, with an inventory of 8,000 VHS and 2,000 Beta tapes. The chain's name is derived from the term blockbuster, a Hollywood term for a successful film. Cook's experience with managing huge databases proved helpful in driving innovation within the industry. Following early success from the company's first stores, Cook built a $6-million warehouse in Garland, Texas, to help sustain and support future growth that allowed new stores to open quickly. Blockbuster would often custom-tailor a store's inventory to its neighborhood, based on local demographics.

In 1987, Waste Management co-founder Wayne Huizenga, who originally had reservations about entering the video rental industry, agreed to acquire several Blockbuster stores. At that time, there were 19 stores, attracting Huizenga's associate John Melk's attention due to its efficiency, family-friendly no-pornography image and business model. Huizenga and Melk utilized techniques from their waste business and Ray Kroc's model of expansion to rapidly expand Blockbuster, and soon they were opening a new store every 24 hours. They took over many of the existing Blockbuster franchise stores, and Huizenga spent much of the late 1980s acquiring several of Blockbuster's rivals, including Major Video. In 1989, Nintendo attempted to halt Blockbuster's ability to rent video games, filing multiple lawsuits and lobbying the U.S. Congress to ban the practice. Nintendo ultimately lost the battle, which paved the way for future video game rental.

Blockbuster sponsored the Blockbuster Bowl in American football, which began in 1990 and was played at Joe Robbie Stadium outside Miami. The first three editions were played under that name before Blockbuster withdrew its sponsorship.

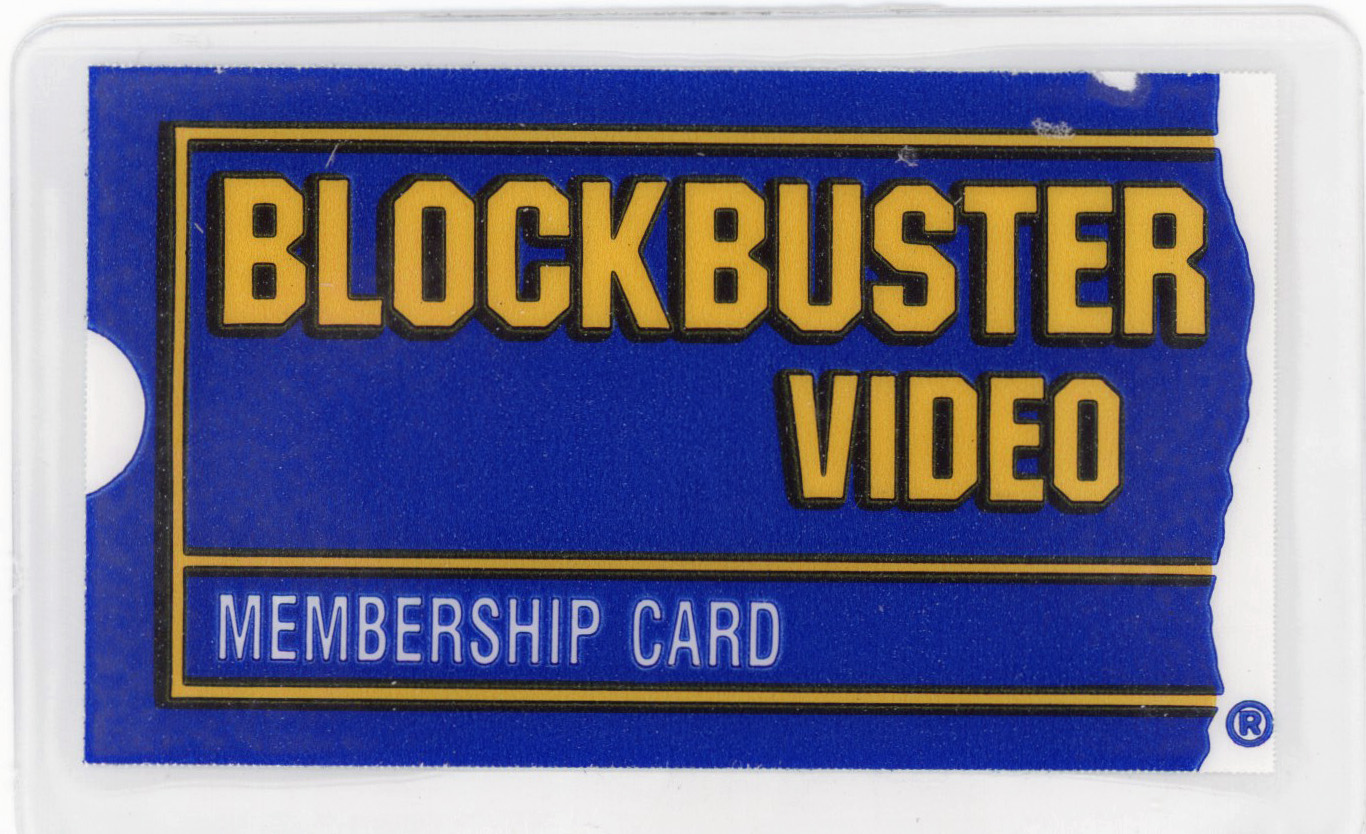
Blockbuster membership card (c. 1990)

In 1990, Blockbuster bought mid-Atlantic rival Erol's which had more than 250 stores. In 1992, Blockbuster acquired the Sound Warehouse and Music Plus music retail chains and created Blockbuster Music. In October 1993, Blockbuster took a controlling interest in Spelling Entertainment Group, a media company run by television producer Aaron Spelling. Blockbuster purchased Super Club Retail Entertainment Corp. on November 22, 1993, from Philips Electronics, N.V. for 5.2 million shares of Blockbuster stock. This brought approximately 270 Record Bar, Tracks, Turtles and Rhythm and Views music stores and approximately 160 video retail superstores into the corporation. It also owned 35% of Republic Pictures; that company merged with Spelling in April 1994.

Blockbuster became a multibillion-dollar company, but Huizenga was worried about how new technology could threaten their business, such as video on demand and the growth of cable television. In 1991, just three days after Time Warner had announced it would upgrade its cable system, Blockbuster's shares dropped more than 10 percent. In 1993, he made an attempt to expand into other areas by investing in Viacom. Huizenga also considered buying a cable company, but this was unknown territory for Blockbuster and he decided not to take the risk. He also had the idea of a 2,500-acre Blockbuster sports and amusement park in Florida, something Blockbuster was still considering as late as August 1994. Unable to come up with a proper solution about how to face the growing threats to the traditional videostore, he made the decision to sell Blockbuster to Viacom and pull out. Viacom acquired Blockbuster in 1994 for $8.4 billion to help finance its bid for Paramount in the bidding war with QVC Network Inc. Blockbuster's stock trade had been dropping steadily the months before the merger, with a small rise after the deal was announced, and by the latter part of the decade, its worth was estimated to have fallen to just $4.6 billion.

The Blockbuster Block Party concept was test-marketed in Albuquerque, New Mexico, and Indianapolis, Indiana, in 1994. It was an "entertainment complex" aimed at adults, containing eight themed areas housing a restaurant, games, laser tag arena, and motion simulator rides, and was housed in a windowless building the size of a city block.

The original Blockbuster company, Blockbuster Video Inc., was merged into the parent company Blockbuster Entertainment Inc. which had earlier replaced the Blockbuster Entertainment Company. In 1996, Blockbuster Entertainment Inc. merged into a new Blockbuster Entertainment Corporation and the retail stores, then called Blockbuster Video, were renamed Blockbuster. The logo changed slightly, but retained the ITC Machine font. In November 1996 Blockbuster confirmed that it was moving its headquarters from Fort Lauderdale, Florida, to the Renaissance Tower in downtown Dallas. Most of the workers at the Florida headquarters did not want to relocate, so Blockbuster planned to hire around 500 to 600 new employees for its Dallas headquarters. The company had offered various relocation packages to all of its Fort Lauderdale staff. The second Blockbuster Entertainment Corporation was later merged into Blockbuster, Inc.

=== 1997–2006: Expansions, acquisitions, and peak ===
In June 1997, Taco Bell president John Antioco resigned from the company to become CEO of Blockbuster. Also that year, Warner Bros. offered Antioco an exclusive rental deal, seeing as DVDs were emerging as the new home video medium. Blockbuster was to have rights to rent new DVD releases for a period of time before they went on sale to the general public. The studio was to receive 40% of rental revenues in return, which was the same deal already in place for VHS rentals. Blockbuster turned the offer down, and the studio responded by lowering its DVD wholesale price in order to compete with the rental industry. Walmart seized the opportunity and in a few years surpassed Blockbuster as the studios' single largest source of revenue. Other mass retailers soon followed suit, selling DVDs below wholesale price as a loss leader in hopes of drawing more customers to their stores and selling them more profitable items. Unable to match prices, Blockbuster's business model was severely affected.

In 1998, Blockbuster created DEJ Productions, which acquired 225 films primarily to provide exclusive content to its Blockbuster stores prior to being sold off to First Look Studios in 2005.

A Blockbuster sign in Stamford, Connecticut, which stood until March 2023, when it was removed and listed for sale online

In late 1998, Blockbuster launched a loyalty program called Blockbuster Rewards that allowed customers to earn free rentals, including one older title each month from the category of Blockbuster Favorites. After a 1998 test launch, the chain went nationwide with the program in 1999. During the test launch Adam C.Hyde sold more Blockbuster Rewards Memberships (Over 1800 in one year) than anyone in the US, in 1998, in the Birmingham, AL Market (Hueytown, AL Store).

In August the same year, Viacom sold the Blockbuster Music chain to Wherehouse Entertainment, which was subsequently purchased by Trans World Entertainment in 2003.

In mid-2000, the company partnered with Enron in an attempt to create a video-on-demand service. The agreement was supposed to last for 20 years; however, Enron terminated the deal in March 2001 over fears that Blockbuster would not be able to provide sufficient films for the service (Enron also filed for bankruptcy that year). Also in 2000, Blockbuster turned down a chance to purchase the fledgling Netflix for $50 million (~$88.7 million in 2025).

In 2002, Blockbuster acquired Movie Trading Company, a Dallas chain that buys, sells, and trades movies and games, to study potential business models for DVD and game trading. Also that year, it acquired Gamestation, a 64-store UK computer and console games retailer chain, and purchased DVD Rental Central for $1 million, an Arizona father-and-son online DVD-rental company with about ten thousand subscribers. DVD Rental Central would eventually become Blockbuster Online.

On or around October 14, 2004, Blockbuster was spun-off from Viacom. Online DVD subscriptions were introduced on Blockbuster.com, also known as Blockbuster Online. Blockbuster also rolled out its "Game Rush" store-in-store concept to approximately 450 domestic company-operated stores. Blockbuster began game and DVD trading in selected U.S. stores.

At its peak in 2004, Blockbuster had more than 9,000 stores worldwide. In December 2004, Blockbuster announced its intention to pursue a hostile takeover of Hollywood Video, its major U.S. competitor. After several extensions of the tender offer, Blockbuster withdrew due to FTC opposition. To counter the Blockbuster offer, Hollywood Video agreed to a buyout in January 2005 by a smaller competitor, the Dothan, Alabama-based Movie Gallery. Since then, Movie Gallery has filed for bankruptcy twice and its entire chain of stores has been liquidated.

In May 2005, financier Carl Icahn waged a successful proxy fight to add himself and two other members to the board. Icahn accused Blockbuster of overpaying chairman and CEO John F. Antioco, who had served in that capacity since 1997, receiving $51.6 million (~$84.2 million in 2025) in compensation for 2004. Icahn was also at odds with Antioco on how to revive profit at Blockbuster. Antioco scrapped late fees in January, started an internet service, and decided to keep the company independent, while Icahn wanted to sell out to a private equity firm. Also in 2005, Blockbuster began a campaign promoting its "No more late fees" policy. The campaign proved controversial, with Associated Press reporting that the new policy actually charged users the full price of the movie or game after eight days which they could cancel by returning the product in question and paying a fee. More than 40 states filed suit against the company for false advertising. Blockbuster later settled the suit by agreeing to refunds, as well as promising to better explain the policy.

Vintage Stock acquired the Movie Trading Company name from Blockbuster in 2006, and continues to use the name for Dallas-area stores.

=== 2007–2011: Leadership changes, decline, and bankruptcy ===
Blockbuster DVD-by-mail envelope

A billion-dollar campaign called "Total Access" was introduced in 2007 as a strategy against Netflix. Through Blockbuster Online, customers could rent a DVD online and receive a new movie for free when they returned it to a Blockbuster store. While it was a major success every free movie cost the company two dollars, but the hope was that it would attract enough new subscribers to cover the loss. Netflix felt threatened, and Netflix CEO Reed Hastings approached Antioco with a suggestion to buy Blockbuster's online business. In return, a new system would be introduced where customers could return their movies to a Blockbuster store. Before the deal could be realized, board member Carl Icahn intervened, refusing to let the company lose more money through Total Access. Antioco was pushed out in July and replaced with James Keyes, who rejected Hastings' proposal, raised the price of online DVD rentals and put an end to the free movie deal. As a consequence, Blockbuster Online's previously massive growth quickly stopped. Antioco's departure reportedly also involved continued controversy over his compensation. He left with a $24.7 million (~$36.9 million in 2025) severance package.

On June 19, 2007, after a pilot program launched in late 2006, Blockbuster announced that it had chosen Blu-ray over HD DVD format to rent in a majority of its stores. In the pilot program, Blockbuster offered selected titles for rental and sale in 250 stores. Blockbuster stocked Blu-ray titles in almost 5,000 stores across the United States, Canada, the United Kingdom, Mexico, and Australia.

On July 2, 2007, the company named James W. Keyes, former president and CEO of 7-Eleven, as the new chairman and CEO. He introduced a new business strategy that included enhancements to existing stores. The following month in August, Blockbuster acquired Movielink for $6.6 million (~$9.86 million in 2025), forecasting a shift to streaming video. Movielink was an online video service that allowed customers to download movie rentals from a library of over 6,000 films, created in 2002 by five major studios including Warner Bros, MGM Studios, Paramount Pictures, Sony Pictures, and Universal Studios. The move gave Blockbuster the opportunity to move away from the unprofitable Total Access (DVD-by-mail) service in favor of online streaming. Despite growing competition from Netflix and Redbox, the company downplayed the threat, choosing instead to focus on Apple and Walmart as their primary competition.

On February 17, 2008, Blockbuster proposed a buyout of struggling Circuit City. However, following a due diligence review of Circuit City's financial books, Blockbuster withdrew its offer in July 2008. Analysts were not favorable to the proposed deal, viewing it as a desperate effort to save two struggling retailers rather than a bold turnaround initiative. Subsequently, Circuit City filed for bankruptcy on November 10, 2008, and, after liquidating all of its stores, ceased operations on March 8, 2009.

At the beginning of 2010, Blockbuster had over 6,500 stores, of which 4,000 were in the United States— a number that fell to 3,425 in late October the same year. In the United States it planned to close between 810 and 960 retail stores, and instead launch as many as 10,000 "Blockbuster Express" video rental kiosks by the middle of 2010. It has been claimed that more than 43 million U.S. households had Blockbuster memberships.

On February 10, 2010, Blockbuster announced that it would cease all its operations in Portugal, closing down 17 outlets and leaving over 100 workers unemployed. Blockbuster representatives in Portugal blamed internet piracy and the lack of government response to it as the key factors to the company's failure in the country.

In March 2010, Blockbuster began "Additional Daily Rates", or "ADRs", for rentals not returned by their due date in the United States, having already used this procedure in other countries such as the UK for many years. An ADR was charged for each day a member kept the rental beyond the rental terms. On March 12, 2010, PricewaterhouseCoopers, Blockbuster's independent registered public accounting firm, issued its audit opinion disclosing substantial doubt about Blockbuster's ability to continue as a going concern. This report was included in Blockbusters's 10-K SEC filing. On March 17, 2010, Blockbuster issued a bankruptcy warning after continued drops in revenue threatened its ability to service its nearly $1 billion (~$1.44 billion in 2025) debt load. By April 1, 2010, Carl Icahn had resigned from Blockbuster's board of directors and sold nearly all his remaining Blockbuster stock. Blockbuster paired up with Time Warner to have Warner Bros. movies made available in Blockbuster stores on the DVD release date and not be subject to a four-week delay. Similar agreements were also made with Universal and 20th Century Fox.

The liquidation of Movie Gallery began in May 2010, eliminating Blockbuster's primary competitor. During the same month a dissident shareholder, Gregory S. Meyer, in an effort to be elected to Blockbuster's board of directors, engaged in a proxy battle with Blockbuster's board, alleging that the board had been responsible for significant destruction of value to shareholders. Meyer was elected to the board at Blockbuster's shareholder meeting in Dallas on June 24, 2010.

On July 1, 2010, the company was delisted from the New York Stock Exchange (NYSE) after its shareholders failed to pass a reverse stock split plan aimed at heading off involuntary delisting because of the stock's trading at well below $1 per share. The stock was then traded on the OTCBB (over-the-counter bulletin board).

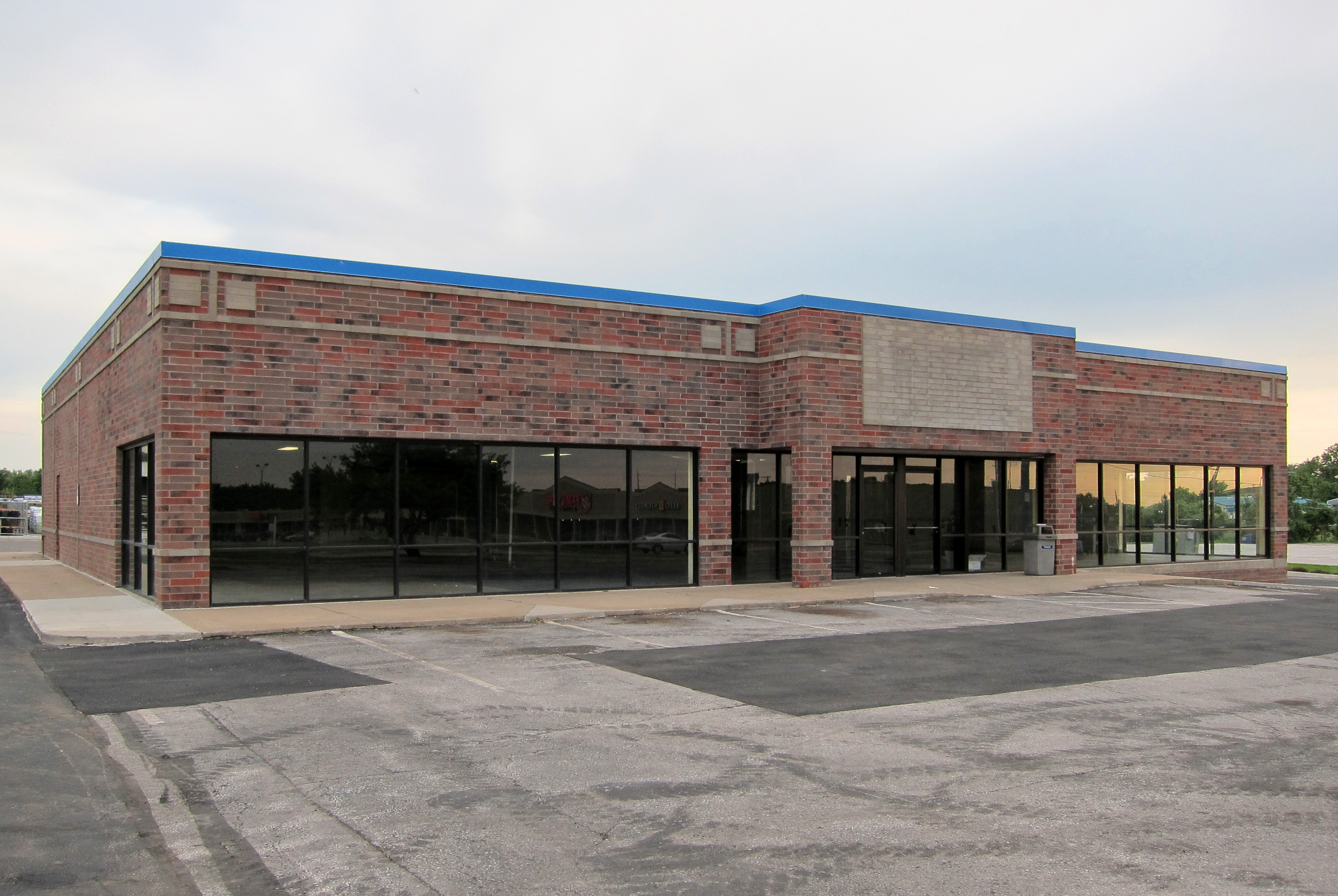
A former Blockbuster store in the Midwest (2012)

Blockbuster was unable to make a $42.4 million (~$61 million in 2025) interest payment to bondholders and was given until August 13, 2010, to pay off the debt. The company hired Jeff Stegenga to be its chief restructuring officer (CRO) in an effort to satisfy bondholder demands and recapitalize the company. After failing to pay on August 13, bondholders gave Blockbuster until September 30, 2010.

On August 26, 2010, news media reported that Blockbuster was planning to file a pre-packaged Chapter 11 bankruptcy in mid-September. In light of this news, the company's chief financial officer (CFO), Tom Casey, resigned on September 11. He was replaced by Dennis McGill, formerly CFO of Safety-Kleen Systems, Inc. On September 23, 2010, Blockbuster filed for Chapter 11 bankruptcy protection due to challenging losses, $900 million (~$1.3 billion in 2025) in debt, and strong competition from Netflix, Redbox, and video on-demand services. Movie Gallery/Hollywood Video had filed for Chapter 7 bankruptcy liquidation earlier in 2010 for similar reasons.

At the time of its Chapter 11 filing, Blockbuster said it would keep its 3,300 stores open; however, that December it announced it would close an additional 182 stores by the end of April 2011 in attempts to emerge from bankruptcy. It was reported in February 2011 that Blockbuster and its creditors had not come up with a Chapter 11 exit plan and that the company would be sold for $300 million (~$423 million in 2025) or more, along with taking over debts and leases. Blockbuster admitted that it might not be able to meet financial obligations required under its Chapter 11 filing, a circumstance which could mandate conversion of the bankruptcy filing to Chapter 7 (liquidation). On March 1, 2011, the U.S. Department of Justice filed a claim disclosing that Blockbuster did not have the funds to continue reorganizing and should liquidate.

=== 2011–2015: Dish Network acquisition and store closures ===
On March 28, 2011, South Korean telecommunications company SK Telecom made a surprise bid to buy Blockbuster. Dish Network had also expressed interest in bidding, as did Carl Icahn, despite calling Blockbuster "the worst investment I ever made". Dish eventually won the auction on April 6, 2011, agreeing to buy Blockbuster for $320 million (~$451 million in 2025) and the assumption of $87 million (~$123 million in 2025) in liabilities and other obligations. On April 19, 2011, it was announced that Dish would keep only 500 Blockbuster stores open. The acquisition was completed on April 26, 2011. In April 2011, Dish Network told the U.S. Bankruptcy Court that it needed more time to negotiate with landlords in an effort to keep more than 600 Blockbuster stores open. Blockbuster's landlords objected to its assumption of leases that it sought to assign to soon-to-be-owner Dish Network Corp., claiming that they did not have adequate assurance that the new owner would honor those leases. Blockbuster signed a deal with ITV Studios Global Entertainment to launch ITV Programmes released on DVDs, Blu-rays, etc. On May 6, 2011, Keyes resigned as Blockbuster's CEO.

Keyes was replaced by Michael Kelly under the new title of Blockbuster's president. On August 31, 2011, the liquidators announced the closure of the remaining 253 Canadian stores and shutting of the entire Canadian unit. In September 2011, it was announced that Blockbuster and Dish Network would launch a new service called Blockbuster Movie Pass that would compete with Netflix. For $10 per month the members would have access to both a streaming service and movies and games-by-mail. The package was only available for subscribers of Dish Network's pay-TV service, and it eventually folded.

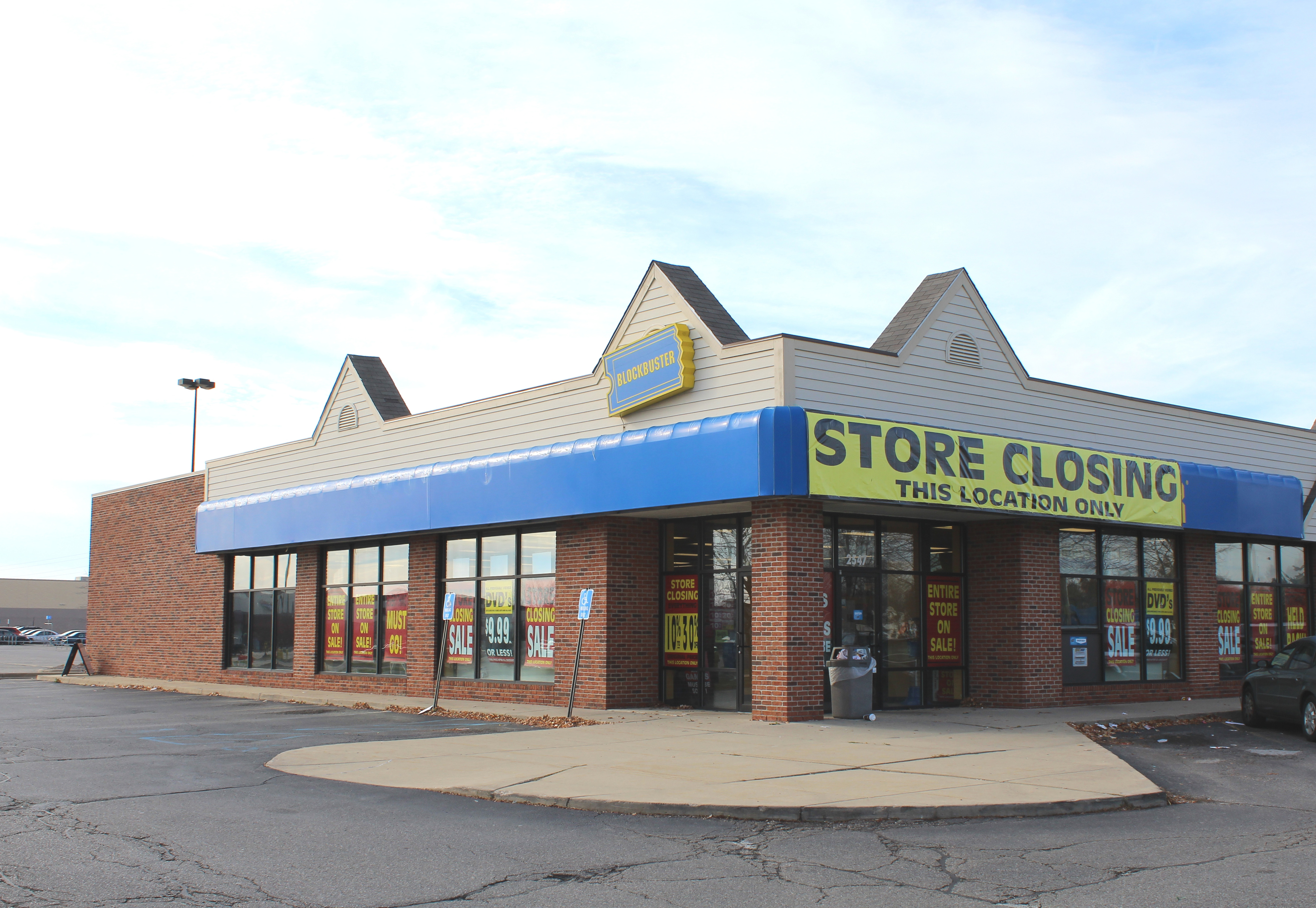
A "now closed" Blockbuster store in Ypsilanti, Michigan undergoing a liquidation sale in 2013

On January 13, 2012, Dish CEO Joe Clayton announced that while Dish had planned to keep 90% of the stores in operation, meaning around 15,000 employees would remain employed, because of market factors "there are ones that aren't going to make it. We will close unprofitable stores. We will close additional stores." Clayton did not say when these additional closings would happen and only remarked that some stores were unprofitable. The Dish chief would not say which stores the company was planning to close, but that each potential closing was to be assessed on a "case by case basis".

On October 4, 2012, Dish Network announced that it was scrapping plans to make Blockbuster into a Netflix competitor. On January 16, 2013, Blockbuster UK entered into administration and Deloitte was appointed to run the business while trying to find a buyer while some of the stores remained open. Between November 6, 2013, and January 12, 2014, Dish Network closed all 300 remaining corporate-owned Blockbuster stores in the United States and the DVD-by-mail program was shut down. The Blockbuster official website identified 51 franchise locations remaining in operation in the United States in 2014. Dish maintained its video streaming services, Blockbuster on Demand and Blockbuster@Home, until they were replaced by a new subscription service in April 2015 called "DISH Movie Pack". In May 2015, Michael Kelly retired from Dish.

Blockbuster's decline was attributed to poor leadership according to others in the industry. Franchise owner Ken Tisher said in 2015, "Blockbuster, if it isn't already, is going to go into the Harvard Business Review for how not to run a business, or how to run a business into the ground." Keith Hoogland, owner of Family Video, attributed poor decision-making as a primary reason the company did not survive. Jonathan Salem Baskin, a former Blockbuster marketing communications executive, stated, "Digital would have changed Blockbuster's business, for sure, but it wasn't its killer. That credit belongs to Blockbuster itself." Commentators view Blockbuster as a main example of failing to change with the times.

=== 2015–present: Final international closures and the last Blockbuster ===
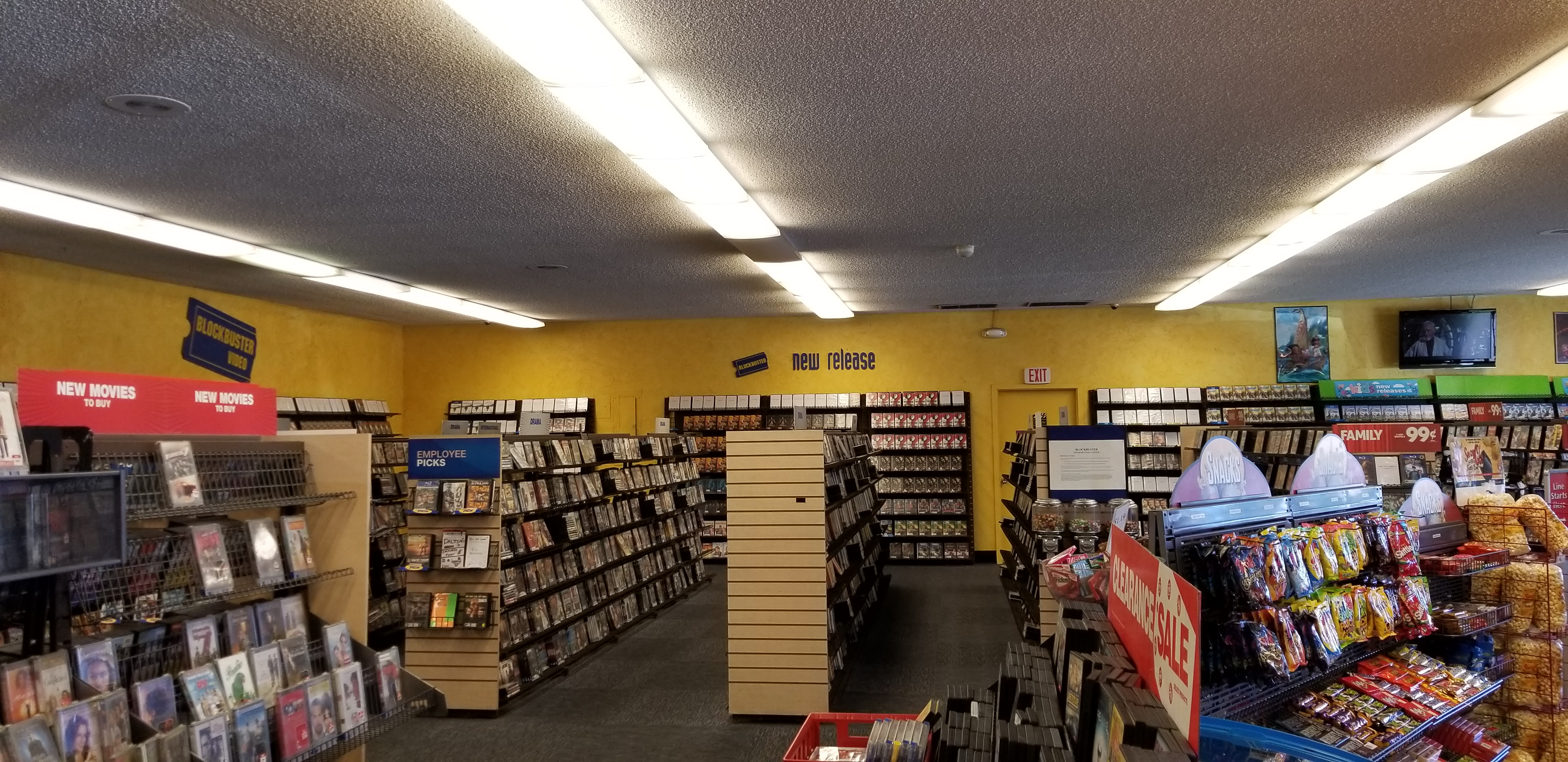
The last remaining Blockbuster located in Bend, Oregon

Although Blockbuster stores had the option of remaining open by paying a licensing fee to Dish, a corporate entity was no longer available to provide supplies of branded products, forcing franchisees to design and produce their own. Additional store closures continued. With these closures, David Carrera and a few other ex-Blockbuster employees gathered at Carrera's Plano home to develop a system so that Carrera could support the IT of the remaining franchisees remotely, eventually establishing the Carrera Company to exclusively do so. By January 2018, the company's website listed nine remaining franchise-owned stores in the United States, including six in Alaska, two in Oregon, and one in Texas. Eight of those nine had closed by August 2018, leaving only one store in Bend, Oregon.

In January 2020, the last remaining store outside of the United States, located in Dargaville, New Zealand, closed its doors. The Bend location became the last remaining Blockbuster in the world; it serves as a tourist destination, housing Blockbuster memorabilia and Russell Crowe film props which John Oliver had donated to an Alaska store. In August 2020, the location was listed as an Airbnb rental for a 1990s-themed sleepover on three separate nights in September; each were limited to guests from the area in light of the COVID-19 pandemic.

While there is no obvious explanation as for why the store in Bend was able to outlast every other franchise in Oregon, the United States, North America and eventually the entirety of planet Earth; a potential factor in the prolonged success of the franchise is due to its location in a large and sparsely populated region of Central Oregon where many residents live in extremely remote and isolated communities without broadband access. Additionally, Oregon is one of only five states which does not levy a statewide sales tax, which makes it a particularly strategic state to open physical franchises. Despite the obsolete nature of Blockbuster's business model and the complete absence of a reason to establish new brick-and-mortar storefronts, the location in Bend has demonstrated no intention of closing their doors; even going as far as to proclaim that Blockbuster would only die if they killed it themselves.

In addition to tourism related to the Blockbuster itself, surrounding businesses in the neighborhood have benefited from increased foot traffic, and have factored the only remaining Blockbuster on Earth into Bend's perceived "weird" reputation, as is shared with other parts of Oregon; a local craft brewery even created a "Last Blockbuster" ale with flavors of red licorice.

Additionally, the Blockbuster serves to attract visitors to a remote but scenic area of Oregon that may otherwise be overlooked; with the Blockbuster being within an hour from areas such as Mount Bachelor and the Three Sisters.

The entity that operated Blockbuster prior to the sale to Dish remains nominally active under the name BB Liquidating Inc., and trades as a penny stock. However, it no longer has any assets or ties to the Blockbuster brand or its remaining franchise location. In activity related to the GameStop short squeeze of January 2021, the BB Liquidating stock surged, despite there being "no value for the common shareholders in the bankruptcy liquidation process, even under the most optimistic of scenarios." On June 29, 2026, EchoStar announced Dish Network itself would file for Chapter 11 bankruptcy protection by June 30. EchoStar blamed the decision on heavy debt and subscriber losses, as well as legal troubles with federal regulators on whether it has met obligations to deploy wireless spectrum licenses. On June 30, Dish DBS filed for prepackaged Chapter 11 bankruptcy in Texas, listing assets and liabilities between $10 billion and $50 billion.

On September 21, 2022, the Blockbuster Twitter account revealed the Blockbuster World Video Game Championship 3. The event was held during the Portland Retro Gaming Expo 2022. On March 23, 2023, the Blockbuster web page was re-activated, with the message "We are working on rewinding your movie." As of July 2026, the message has remained unchanged except to promote Dish-owned Sling TV.

== Business model ==
The standard business model for video rental stores had traditionally been to pay a large flat fee per video, approximately $65, and offer unlimited rentals for the lifetime of the medium itself. Sumner Redstone, whose Viacom conglomerate then owned Blockbuster, personally pioneered a new revenue-sharing arrangement for video. Blockbuster obtained videos for little cost and kept 60% of the rental fee, paying the other 40% to the studio, and reporting rental information through the global media measurement and research company Rentrak. In addition to benefiting from a lower initial price, Blockbuster also capitalized on the fact that movies were generally not available for purchase at affordable price points during initial release periods. Thus customers had to rent, wait, or buy the film on tape at the much higher manufacturer's suggested retail price that was specifically targeted at rental chains for unlimited rentals and to a much lesser degree, film enthusiasts, which at that time ranged between $70–$100 per title.

=== Quantity and selection of titles ===
Blockbuster stores followed a strategy of emphasizing access to the most popular new releases, obtaining early access, and stocking many copies of the new-release titles, with a relatively narrower range of selections than traditional independent video stores. Much of the shelf space in the stores was devoted to popular titles that were placed relatively sparsely on the shelves with the entire front cover visible, so customers could browse casually and quickly, rather than having a more diverse selection with fewer copies of each title. Blockbuster sometimes contracted with studios to obtain earlier access to new titles than other companies could achieve. Examples of such contracts were those in which Blockbuster became the exclusive rental chain for new releases from WWE, Funimation Entertainment, Rhino, Paramount, DreamWorks, DWA, Universal, Lionsgate, Summit, Anchor Bay, Manga, The Weinstein Company, Dimension, Miramax, Hollywood, Touchstone, Disney, Buena Vista, 20th Century Fox, MGM/UA, Orion, Sony, Columbia, Tristar, Image, Shout! Factory, Warner Bros., HBO, New Line Cinema and Allumination FilmWorks. As one commentator complained:

Blockbuster was once an unstoppable giant whose franchises swept across the country putting mom and pop video stores out of business left and right by offering a larger selection of new releases, pricing them at a lower point due to the volume they worked in... Gone were the fragmented, independently owned shops that were often unorganized treasure troves of VHS discoveries. In their place were walls of new releases: hundreds of copies of a small handful of films. Everyone watching the same thing, everyone developing the same limited set of expectations... They put focus entirely on what was new rather than on discovering film history ...

When a title was no longer a new release, each store would retain a few copies of it and typically sell off the rest as "previously viewed" for discounted prices. Older movies would be re-categorized as "Blockbuster Favorite" titles and placed in a different area of the store. Most Blockbuster locations also accepted trade-ins of used movies, TV shows, and games.

Since Blockbuster's founding in 1985, the chain refused to stock adult films in order to portray the brand as family-friendly. However, the company did carry R-rated and unrated films.

== Other ventures ==
=== Blockbuster Entertainment Awards ===
Blockbuster Entertainment Inc. ran an awards show annually from 1995 to 2001 called the Blockbuster Entertainment Awards. In November 2001, Blockbuster announced that it would cancel the 2002 award show following concerns about viewership and celebrity attendance following the September 11 attacks.

=== Blockbuster Express ===
Blockbuster Express was a movie-rental kiosk brand sublicensed for use by licensee NCR Corporation. In 2011, nearly 10,000 Blockbuster Express kiosks were in operation. Apart from the license to use the Blockbuster brand name, Blockbuster Express kiosks are unrelated to Blockbuster LLC, its stores, its DVD-by-mail service, or its online streaming service.

The names Blockbuster Express and Blockbuster Video Express had also been used for smaller Blockbuster retail stores in the United Kingdom.

=== GameRush ===
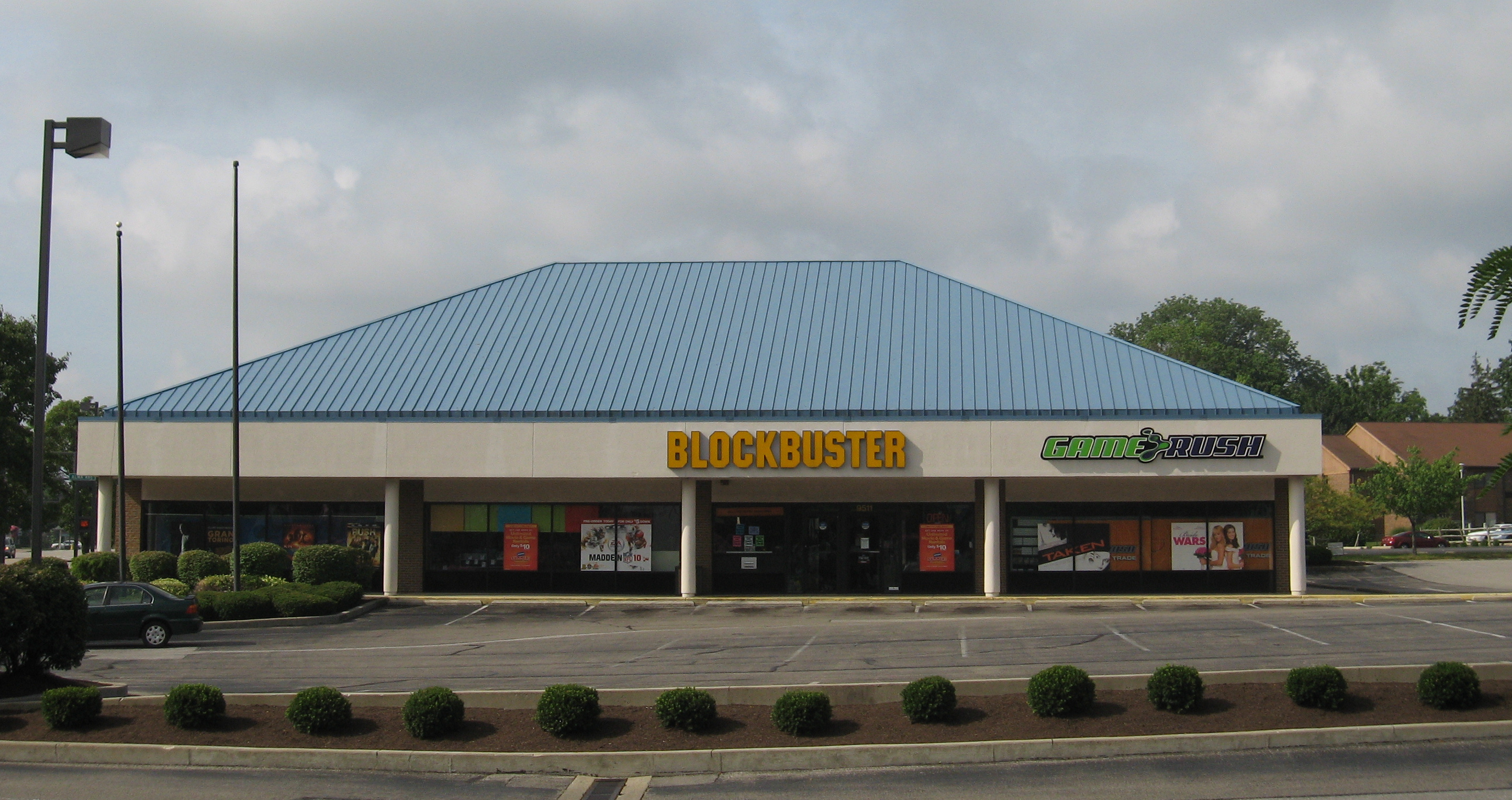
GameRush store at a Blockbuster in Blue Ash, Ohio

In 2004, Blockbuster opened store-within-a-store video game rental and sales stores called GameRush inside Blockbuster locations in limited markets. Blockbuster also acquired Rhino Video Games, a chain of video game stores in the Southwest, and operated it alongside GameRush. These stores sold and bought DVDs, games, game consoles, and accessories. GameRush was positioned as a direct competitor to stores such as GameStop and GameCrazy. Blockbuster used its location status to get instant coverage; it also promoted these stores by hosting video-game tournaments, special trade-in offers, and a more 'hip' look to the selection and staff. However, when Blockbuster introduced the discontinuation of late fees, GameRush was put on the chopping block. In January 2007, Blockbuster sold Rhino Video Games to GameStop Corp. According to the Blockbuster Twitter account, GameRush was to be part of the "new Blockbuster" in 2016 and even had its own Twitter profile, however the GameRush Twitter account has not been active since January 2017.

=== Discovery Zone ===
In 1993, Blockbuster invested in the indoor kids' play restaurant Discovery Zone. In 1995, Blockbuster bought more stock to take control of the company. Discovery Zone filed for Chapter 11 bankruptcy protection on March 26, 1996, after changes in management & aggressive expansion put them in heavy debt. DZ was emerged a year later under Wellspring Associates ownership, with Blockbuster no longer having control of the chain. Discovery Zone abruptly closed half of its locations in 1999 and sold thirteen others to the parent company of Chuck E. Cheese's. The rest of the Discovery Zone locations closed in December 2001. The chain was revived as a single location in Cincinnati, Ohio, on February 7, 2020. It remains in operation, but it is not owned by Blockbuster.

== International operations ==
=== North America ===
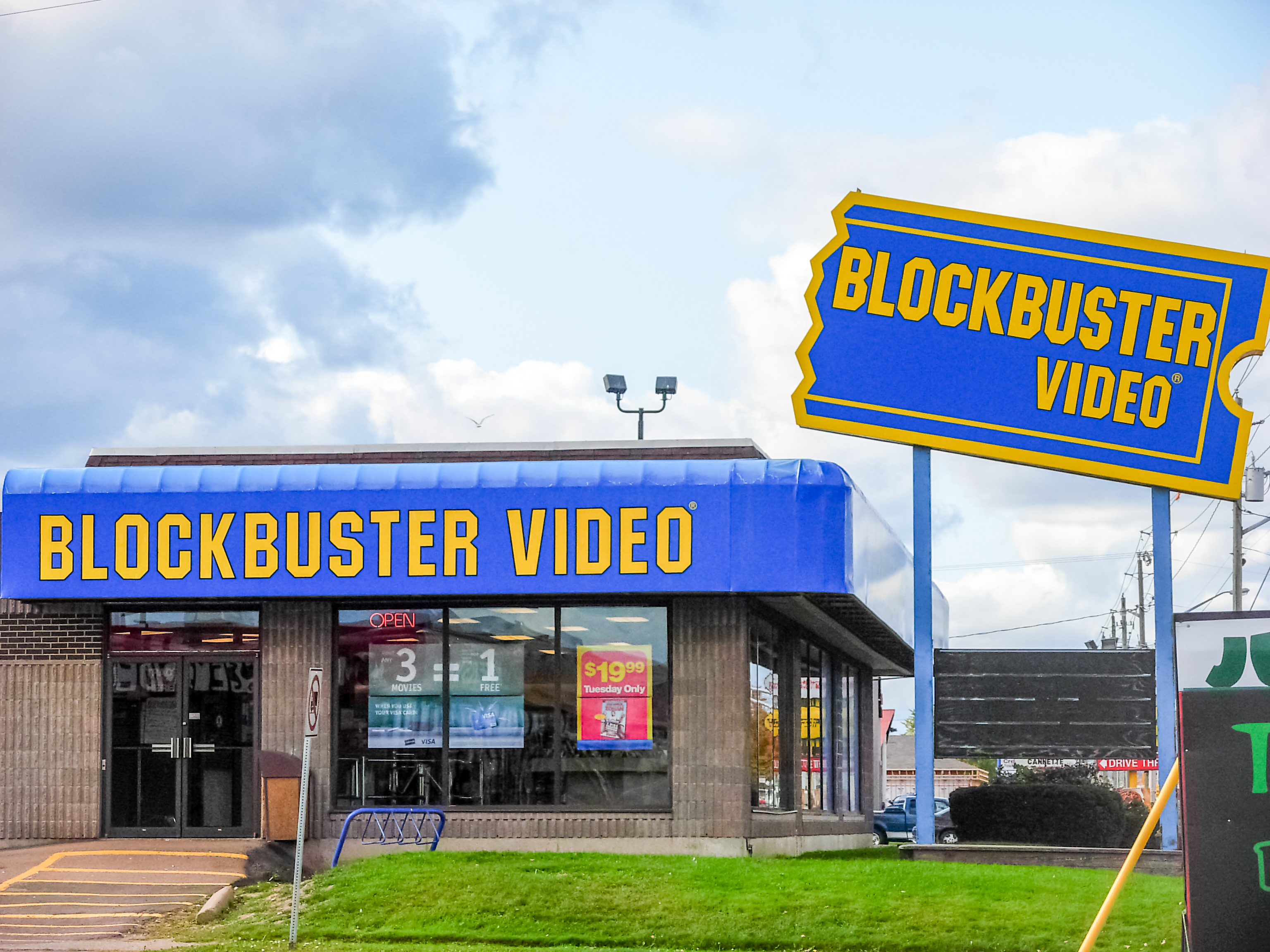
A Blockbuster store in Moncton, New Brunswick, Canada, which featured the 1985–1997 logo.

Blockbuster entered the Canadian market in November 1989. The branch operated independently, and it initially remained financially stable. In contrast to international Blockbuster franchises, Blockbuster had sold mobile phones when it began a partnership with Wind Mobile in December 2009 at all stores in cities where Wind's service was available. Phone sales began in Toronto and Calgary, later expanding to other cities with Wind coverage. Some stores even featured a full Wind "store-in-a-store" for postpaid activations and a larger selection of devices. However, on May 3, 2011, it was announced that the company had gone into receivership.

On May 25, 2011, it was announced that 146 stores, accounting for approximately 35% of the company's stores in Canada, would be shut down effective June 18, 2011. On August 31, 2011, Blockbuster Canada announced that no buyer could be found for its remaining stores that were acceptable to the court-appointed bankruptcy receiver, and that it would wind down operations and close all stores by December 31, 2011. The company had acted as a guarantor towards Blockbuster's remaining debt.

A location in Owen Sound, Ontario which was vacant after its closure, had it signs remained intact as of 2025. This location has cemented its status as the last Blockbuster standing in Canada and was featured in Chandler Levack's 2022 film I Like Movies.

The first Mexican Blockbuster stores opened in 1991. In September 2015, all remaining Blockbuster retail stores (263 in total) in Mexico had been converted to "The B Store", and the floor space dedicated to video rentals reduced from 70% to 20%, the remaining space being used for general technology and electronics sales. The re-branding occurred with the owners not renewing their license with Blockbuster and the imminent expiry of the existing license. All remaining B-stores closed by July 2016.

=== Europe ===
==== United Kingdom ====
===== Expansion =====
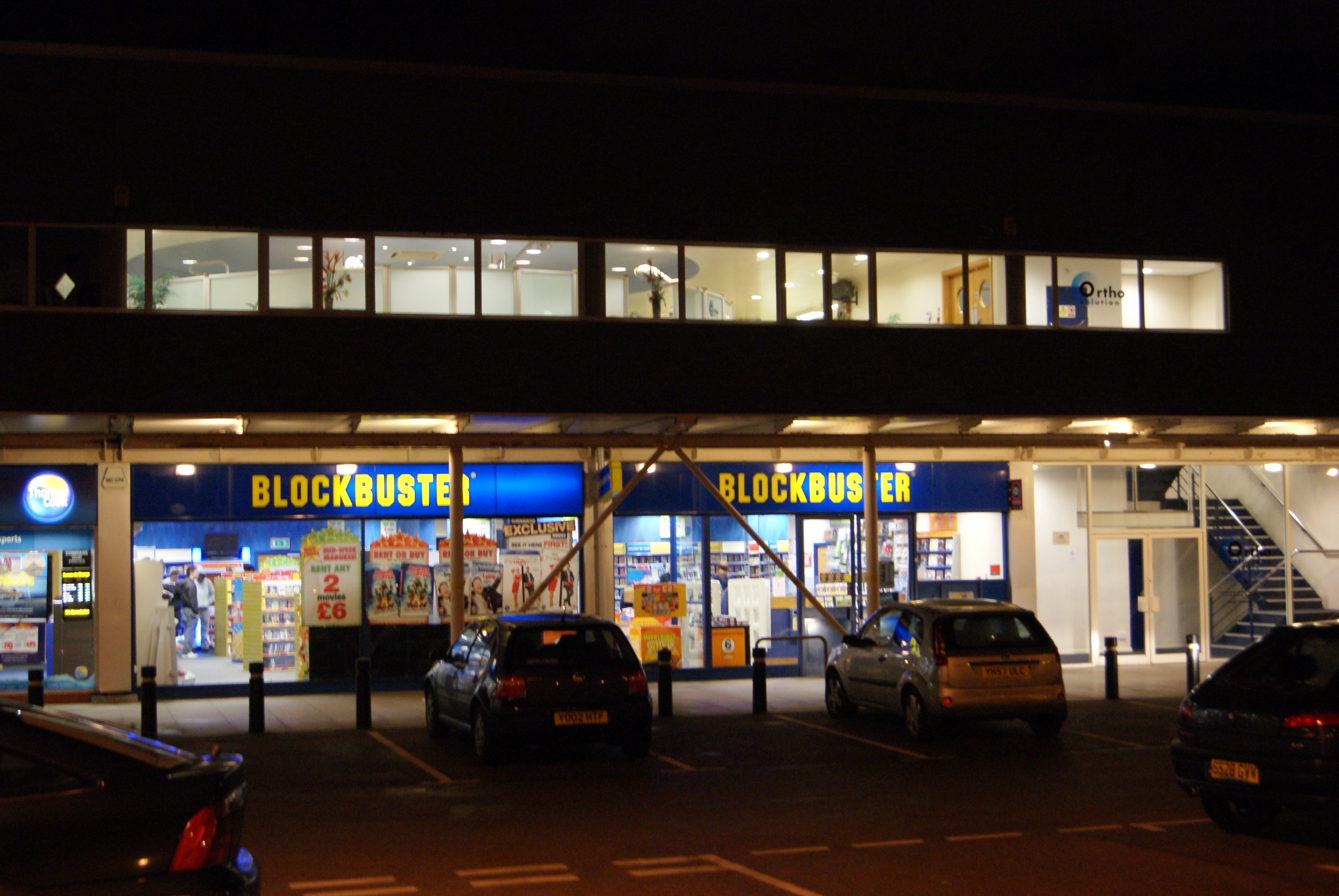
A Blockbuster store in Moor Allerton, Leeds

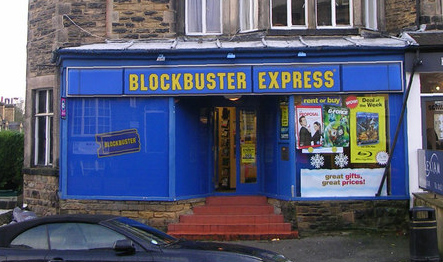
A "Blockbuster Express" shop in Harrogate, Yorkshire, typical of the smaller UK stores often located in established urban and suburban areas

In March 1989, Blockbuster opened their first store in the United Kingdom on Walworth Road, London. Prior to its opening, there were several other video stores in the United Kingdom with the name Blockbuster, many of whom Blockbuster bought out before opening their first store in the country. One chain that they could not buy out was the Blockbuster chain based in Portsmouth, founded in 1984, which claimed to be the third largest video chain in the United Kingdom and meant that Blockbuster avoided the Portsmouth area. In February 1992, Blockbuster purchased Citivision PLC, the biggest home-video company in Britain, for $81 million (~$167 million in 2025). At the time, Citivision operated about 775 stores in Britain branded as Ritz. Blockbuster UK operated trade functions in all their stores, buying and selling pre-owned DVDs, console games, and gaming accessories. Stores offered either store credit or cash for trade-ins, and would price-match with competitors. At its height in 2002, Blockbuster UK operated out of over 800 stores.

Blockbuster also operated stores in Northern Ireland via the Xtra-vision chain which it owned between 1996 and 2009.

===== Administration and closure of UK stores =====
In early 2013, Blockbuster UK had 528 locations. On January 16, 2013, Blockbuster placed its United Kingdom subsidiaries in administration, putting over 4,000 jobs at risk. Non-UK stores were unaffected by the administration, and continued to trade as normal. On February 1, 2013, a large number of Blockbuster stores in the UK were closed, and the UK business was purchased out of administration by restructuring firm Gordon Brothers Europe on March 23, 2013. Blockbuster UK then traded as TS Operations, with only 264 branches retained. On October 29, 2013, Blockbuster UK announced it was to go into administration for a second time. On November 14, 2013, 72 store closures were announced, with another 62 made on December 5. A week later, with no success in finding a buyer, it was announced by Moorfields Corporate Recovery that all remaining stores in the country would cease operation on December 16, 2013, with stock to be cleared the day before this.

===== Later use of name on UK market =====
In September 2018, to coincide with the digital release of Deadpool 2, a pop-up retail store in the style of an original 1989 Blockbuster outlet was opened for two days in Shoreditch in East London. The store gave away 1,989 copies of the film in reference to Blockbuster's entry year into the UK market. In 2019, Blockbuster lent its name to a party game published by Big Potato Games.

In April 2025, Blockbuster lent their name to KitKat for a pop-up Blockbuster shop in Soho, London.

==== Ireland ====
In October 1996, Blockbuster ventured into Ireland and acquired the video store chain Xtra-vision, retaining the chain's brand name.

Xtra-vision operated in both Northern Ireland and the Republic of Ireland.

In March 2010, Blockbuster announced that it intended to sell all operations in Europe. Blockbuster sold Xtra-vision at a loss in August 2009 to Birchhall Investments Limited. All remaining stores were closed in 2016, leaving only its online business and vending machines. In June 2021, Xtra-vision Xpress was placed into voluntary receivership.

==== Continental Europe ====
In 1995, Blockbuster formed a partnership with publisher Hubert Burda Media to develop stores in Germany. Blockbuster left the German market in 1997.

Blockbuster came to Denmark in 1996 with the acquisition of 29 Christianshavn video stores. In 2009, Blockbuster Denmark on its peak with 72 stores across the country. Blockbuster Video Denmark sold the rights for the Blockbuster brand to the Danish telecommunications corporation TDC in 2013, excluding the 46 remaining brick and mortar stores which continued as RecycleIT A/S, diversifying in refurbishing and reselling consumer electronics in addition sale and rental of games and movies. The original goal was to rename all the stores before July 1, 2014, when TDC would get the exclusive rights to the brand name in Denmark, but only 12 of them had been renamed at the end of June and RecycleIT A/S filed for bankruptcy the same year. The 12 RecycleIT stores were bought by the company Blue City. The new owners planned to gradually phase out game and movie sales and rental within 2016, but due to the fast changes in the market it happened almost immediately after the takeover, and seven of the stores, therefore, closed in 2015. In 2017, the five remaining ones had started to make some profit, and focus exclusively on second-hand consumer electronics. However, the Blockbuster On Demand service is still active in Nordic countries, offering both unlimited streaming and 48-hour rental of films online. Several Smart TVs have the Blockbuster app pre-installed out-of-the-box, and it is available on a variety of streaming devices such as Google's Chromecast. The rights to the Blockbuster brand are now in hands of Nuuday.

In December 2002, the first Blockbuster store opened in Norway, and was followed by another store some months later in 2003, both located in Oslo. The hope was to acquire an already existing video chain. When that failed, it was made an attempt to build a Norwegian blockbuster chain from scratch. But both stores closed in the spring of 2004.

=== Asia ===
In March 1991, Fujita Den Trading (which was the master franchise owner of McDonald's in Japan) and Blockbuster Inc. entered into a joint venture to establish Japan's first Blockbuster Video stores. By October 1992, Fujita and Blockbuster opened 15 stores in the country – four of them next to McDonald's outlets and most being located in the greater Tokyo area. Unlike Blockbuster's U.S. stores, each Japanese outlet only occupied about half the floor space at 5,000 square feet due to the country's more limited available real estate. By June 1996, 32 stores were in operation with a public aim for 150 by 1998. Blockbuster Japan faced heavy competition from Osaka-based video rental chain, Tsutaya, with its 817 outlets, but the company saw opportunity in the population having high VCR ownership levels (at around 75%), low satellite TV penetration (at around 27%), and well-ordered store layouts (unique for most local video stores). However, Blockbuster's business strategy of "wholesome home entertainment" saw it refuse to stock adult entertainment, which accounted for 35% of the Japanese video market, or the extreme horror films that were also popular. All of which meant Blockbuster was unable to fit adequately into the Japanese market, and was immediately put at a disadvantage compared to competitors that had no such ethical stance. Blockbuster handed its remaining shares over to Fujita Den Trading in 1999, and exited the Japanese market.

In 1998, after the closure of KPS Video Express, Blockbuster saw an opportunity to enter into the Hong Kong market, and entered into negotiations with KPS's receivers Ernst & Young to buy the KPS operations. Blockbuster re-opened 15 of 38 former KPS stores by February 16, 1998, and re-employed 145 former KPS staff. KPS members were given special offers to join Blockbuster, but the video pre-paid coupon system was not retained. Blockbuster pulled out of the market in 2004 after high operating costs and losses to copyright infringement.

=== Australia and New Zealand ===
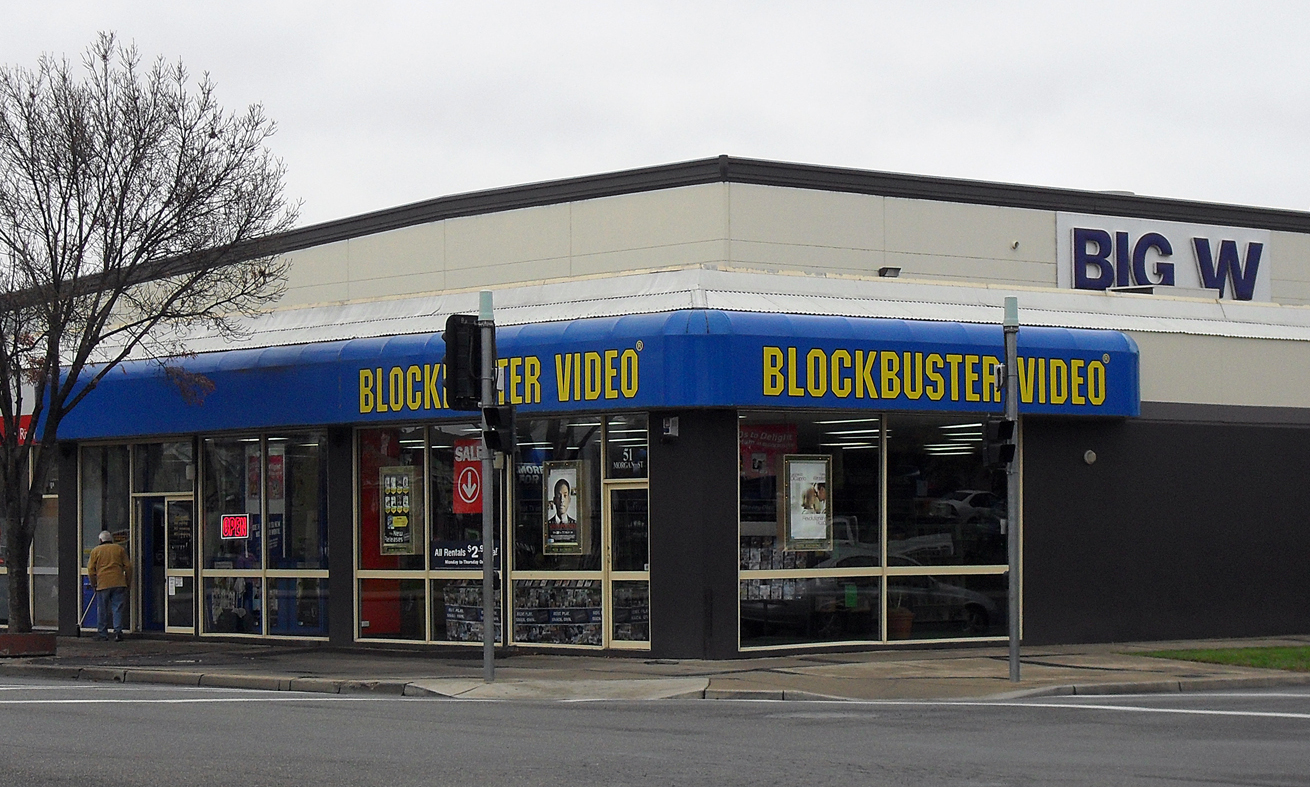
A Blockbuster Video store in Wagga Wagga Marketplace, New South Wales, Australia

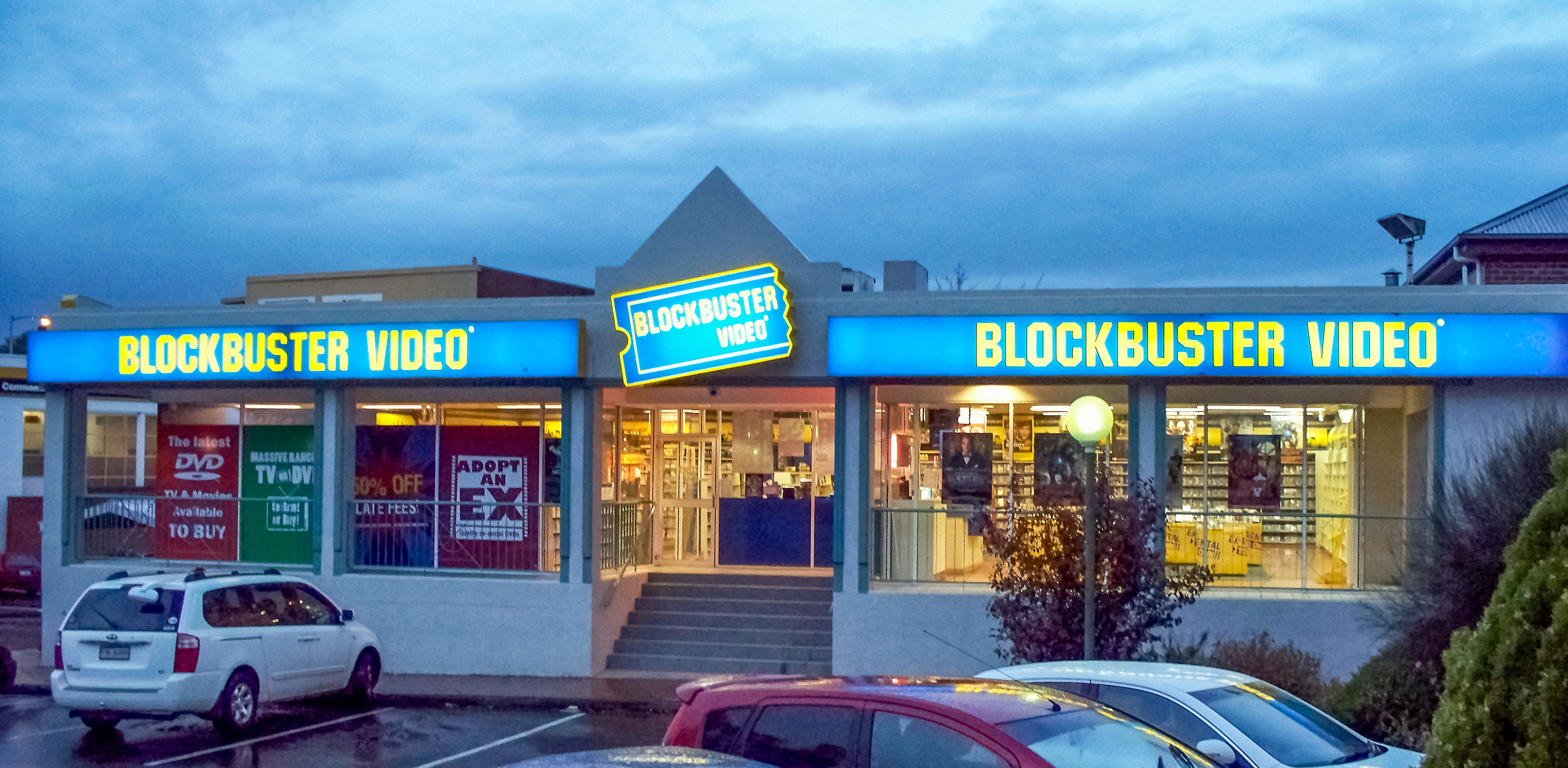
A Blockbuster store in Sandy Bay, an inner suburb of Hobart, Tasmania, Australia

In Australia, the first Blockbuster store was opened in 1991 in Melbourne. In 1992, the Virgin Group and Blockbuster Inc entered into a joint venture to set up Australia's first Virgin Megastores in Sydney, Melbourne, and Adelaide. This lasted until Virgin sold its interest in the six stores to Blockbuster, which promptly rebranded them in 1993 as Blockbuster Music. In 1994, Australian store numbers rose to 54 with the acquisition of Major Video and Focus chains in both Victoria and South Australia. In 1995, the growth continued with the opening of the 100th video store in the country. By the end of 1998, Blockbuster Australia opened over 125 stores. In July 1998, Blockbuster Australia launched into franchising with the conversion of the former Video Flicks franchise group in Queensland, and the former Movieland group in Western Australia six months later. Also in 1998, the company sold its last two Australian Blockbuster Music stores in Pitt Street, Sydney, and Chapel Street, Melbourne to Brazin Limited, which incorporated them under its Sanity Entertainment brand. Throughout 1999 and 2000, Blockbuster Australia quickly expanded its franchise store network through the conversion of smaller groups and the granting of individual franchises. Before 2005, this was done through the acquisition of the Movies Plus Group and the conversion of some individual Movies 4U and Movieland outlets.

In February 2007, Blockbuster sold its entire Australian store network to Video Ezy. At the time, Blockbuster Australia comprised 370 outlets nationwide—29 owned by the company and 341 owned by franchisees. Video Ezy had 518 Australian outlets, all of them being owned by franchisees, pushing the combined group's market share to 40% of the country's video rental sector. Video Ezy committed to the master franchise agreement with Blockbuster for 10 years operating the brand with the possibility of renewal for a further 10 years after that. As a consequence of the deal, the company changed its name from Video Ezy to Franchise Entertainment Group (FEG). In October 2010, FEG transferred control of the Video Ezy Australia and Blockbuster Australia online businesses to its newly acquired and reorganized company, Elan Media Partners, leaving FEG to manage the franchise relationships with individual Video Ezy and Blockbuster outlets. In light of the US branch of Blockbuster to declare bankruptcy in 2010, Blockbuster Australia said it was independent from the effects of the bankruptcy and would continue operating without disrruption.

Despite the two brands coming together, Video Ezy and Blockbuster franchises closed 270 stores across Australia in the four years to August 2011. Additional store closings would go on for several years, until all the stores in Australia had closed, although vending kiosks with the Blockbuster logo were still in operation until early 2021. Australia's last Blockbuster store, in Morley, Western Australia, was closed at the end of March 2019.

The chain also operated for many years in New Zealand, but over the years lost customers to other retailers like United Video and Video Ezy, as well as the rise of streaming services. While the store in Bend, Oregon was generally regarded as the last Blockbuster store, there was one in Dargaville, north of Auckland, that managed to stay open until finally closing at the end of January 2020.

=== South America ===
Blockbuster opened in Brazil in March 1995, and was the largest video rental chain in the country, but finances were not good enough due to high rental prices. Lojas Americanas, the largest Brazilian department store, acquired half of the shares and now it is named under "Americanas Express Blockbuster". The store layout was similar to a regular American store with a Game Rush, but instead of games it offers electronics goods like computers and DVD players, groceries like candies and microwave popcorn, and even toys from Mattel and Hasbro's board games. In January 2007, when Blockbuster had 127 stores across Brazil, it sold its Brazilian stake for $87.4 million (~$131 million in 2025) and gave Lojas Americanas exclusive rights to the Blockbuster brand in the country for 20 years. The average store has an interior of about 400 m^{2}, where 80-100 m^{2} is dedicated to movies.

Blockbuster opened its first store in Peru in December 1995, and by 2002 it had ten stores in Lima. However, in 2006, Blockbuster announced that it planned to shut down its stores in Peru due to poor revenues, which it blamed on the effect of movie piracy. The last store in Peru was closed on January 3, 2007. The company had already closed down its stores in Venezuela, Ecuador and Costa Rica. El Salvador followed in 2010, and Argentina in 2011.

=== Middle East ===
In the late 2000s at its peak, Blockbuster Israel had 40 branches and more than 260 automated video rentals. In December 2011, Blockbuster closed off its last branch store, and had only 80 automated video rentals left.

== Digital initiatives ==
In 1997, Enron Corporation had entered the broadband market, constructing and purchasing thousands of miles of fiber optic cables throughout the United States. In 2001, Enron and Blockbuster Inc. attempted to create a 20-year deal to stream movies on demand over Enron's fiber optic network. However, the "heavily promoted" deal fell through, with Enron's shares dropping following the announcement.

In response to the rising popularity of mail-order DVD rentals pioneered by Netflix, Blockbuster launched its Blockbuster Online service on August 11, 2004, providing nationwide by-mail DVD rentals. The service offered unlimited rentals for a flat monthly fee, initially priced at $19.99 for up to three DVDs at a time.

Blockbuster's US online operation started with around 10 warehouses; further expansions every year brought that number to 41, plus more than 1400 stores in the Blockbuster Online network. Most Blockbuster independent franchises did not honor the Total Access program. The company had 1.5 million subscribers at the end of the third quarter of 2006. Blockbuster's move to follow the business pattern with its online rentals as was established by Netflix prompted Netflix to sue Blockbuster for patent infringement. Blockbuster counter sued with a counterclaim alleging deceptive practices with its patent which it alleged was designed to maintain an illegal monopoly. The suits were eventually settled, and while the terms were not disclosed it was later reported that Netflix recorded a settlement payment from Blockbuster of $4.1 million (~$6.12 million in 2025) in the second quarter of 2007.

Blockbuster offered several online movie rental plans. In some cities customers could add games to their movie rental queue as if they were included in their plan, but game rentals resulted in a separate additional fee which was not displayed or charged until the end of the billing cycle. Until July 26, 2007, Blockbuster offered and advertised unlimited free in-store exchanges of online rentals with all plans. Since then there were several changes back and forth with regard to this policy; in March 2010 customers were allowed a limited number of in-store exchanges.

At the end of 2006, Blockbuster Total Access had 2.2 million customers, exceeding their original goal of 2 million, according to its website. After an aggressive media campaign that accounted for much of Blockbuster's $46.4 million (~$69.3 million in 2025) net loss in the first quarter of 2007, the Total Access subscriber base surpassed 3 million customers in total, marking the company's highest subscriber growth quarter ever. By 2009, however, the company was declining to provide figures when asked by The Wall Street Journal.

On January 5, 2007, Southern Stores Inc., one of Blockbuster's largest franchise operators in the United States, filed a lawsuit in federal court alleging that, by introducing Blockbuster Online and Blockbuster Total Access, the rental chain has undercut the group's franchise agreement. On August 8, 2007, Blockbuster announced that it had reached an agreement to purchase Movielink. According to the 8-K filing by Blockbuster, the total purchase price was $6.6 million.

On August 6, 2010, Blockbuster By Mail subscribers gained access to Blockbuster's library of console games, in addition to movies and television shows.

On March 31, 2012, Blockbuster On Demand removed support from set-top box media players, including Vudu, WDTV, and Roku. Supported devices now only included computers, Blu-ray players, select television sets, and cellular phones.

On February 26, 2013, Roku, Inc. announced that Blockbuster On Demand was being launched on Roku's channel store. Supported devices now included computers, Blu-ray players, select television sets, cellular phones, and the Roku set-top box.

In November 2013, Dish Network said its DVD-by-mail service would shut down by mid-December.

=== Regional online adaptations ===
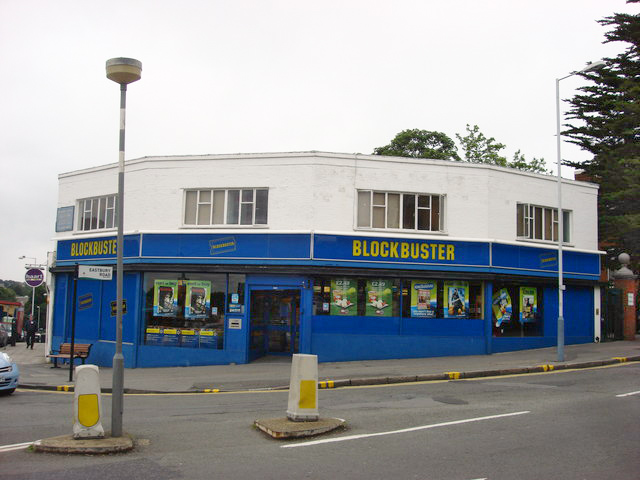
A Blockbuster store in Northwood, London in June 2008

Rentals cost £3.50 to £4.50 and lasted for five nights, usually from Monday to Friday due to the postal service. Late fees of £0.70 to £0.90 per disc applied if a disc was not returned on time.

In May 2004, Blockbuster also introduced an online subscription service. The unlimited three-disc plan cost £14.99/month but did not allow in-store exchange, contrary to the U.S. service. Partial support for in-store exchange was added in April 2005 with the launch of an "OnlineXtra" service. This service cost £2 per month, required an online subscription to a disc plan, and added two extra discs sent by mail. The OnlineXtra discs could be exchanged in store, but the non-OnlineXtra discs could not. The program was discontinued in 2006 with no grandfathering, but an in-store-only variant of it resurfaced in early 2008. A "Click & Collect" service launched in September 2010 allowed the reservation of Blockbuster movies in store, but the store's regular rental fees applied until the company added in-store exchanges in May 2012. Support for game reservations was added in November 2011.

In 2008, Blockbuster UK's website underwent an overhaul, with an online store; a retail store stock checker; improved search functionality; and a critically acclaimed layout. In-store pickup and exclusive titled were added in 2009. Some of the titles which had an exclusivity period at Blockbuster include Gran Torino, Changeling, Taken, and Knowing. Additionally, online rental downloads of Universal Pictures in the United Kingdom remains exclusive to Blockbuster. This provides an advantage to the rental company compared to its competitors HMV, Play, and LoveFilm.

In January 2010, Blockbuster UK launched an online blog. Improved search algorithms, product pages, and social network links were added to the site in April 2010. Blockbuster UK aired a monthly BB Insider online video show from May 2010 to January 2011 and launched an iPhone App in September 2010. Throughout the year 2011, Blockbuster UK announced several price cuts along with a new Blockbuster loyalty card program.

These price drops were followed by a price drop of the Blockbuster UK online pay per rent service. Although some Blockbuster UK advertisements claim that the company no longer charges late fees, the fine print and/or voiceover clarifies that rentals will be charged an extra pound for every additional night. A "Top Ticket" feature was added in April 2011, allowing monthly subscription customers to rent an additional movie at no extra charge and to receive it before other movies they request. Support for online sales of used movie and game discs was added in July 2011. The Blockbuster UK website was enhanced in September 2011. During the following month, a new TV section was added to the website.

3D Blu-rays were added to Blockbuster UK in February 2012. In May 2012, Blockbuster UK partnered with IGN to launch a new Blockbuster VIP Gamer loyalty program.

On January 16, 2013, Blockbuster UK entered administration, appointing Deloitte as company administrators, casting doubt over the future of their 528 stores in the country. An announcement was then made by Deloitte that 160 UK stores would close.

On February 13, 2013, Deloitte announced a further 164 store closures, leaving 204 stores trading in the UK. The business was sold to restructuring firm the Gordon Brothers Group on March 23, 2013. On October 29, 2013, Gordon Brothers filed notice of intention to appoint an administrator. On November 28, 2013, Blockbuster UK officially entered administration for the second time, and by December 2013, all stores were closed, as no buyer for the chain was found.

== Advertising ==
=== Super Bowl ===
One of Blockbuster's most well-known advertising campaigns was launched in 2002 during Super Bowl XXXVI. It starred the voices of James Woods and Jim Belushi as Carl and Ray, a rabbit and a guinea pig in a pet shop located across the road from a Blockbuster store. The first campaign ended in 2003. The Carl and Ray campaign started again in 2007 starting with a commercial in the first quarter of Super Bowl XLI.

=== Misleading advertising ===
In 2005, Blockbuster launched a marketing campaign describing changes in its late fees policy and offering "No Late Fees" on rentals. The program sparked investigations and charges of misrepresentation in 48 states and the District of Columbia: state attorneys general including Bill Lockyer of California, Greg Abbott of Texas, and Eliot Spitzer of New York argued that customers were being automatically charged the full purchase price of late rentals and a restocking fee for rentals returned after 30 days. In a settlement, Blockbuster agreed to reimburse the states the cost of their investigation, clarify communication to customers on the terms of the program, and offer reimbursement to customers charged fees prior to the clarification. New Jersey filed a separate lawsuit and was not a party to the settlement.

The 2005 controversy came after a related lawsuit settled in 2002 in Texas. That lawsuit, alleging exorbitant late fees, led the company to pay $9.25 million in attorney fees and offer $450 million in late fee refund coupons (which were rent-one get-one-free coupons, and thus required the customer to make an initial expenditure). The company estimated that the coupons would ultimately cost about $45 million depending on the redemption rate; an attorney for the plaintiffs estimated the final cost at closer to $100 million at a redemption rate of about 20% (calculated based on a similar case in Michigan).

Such corrections were also sent to international stores such as those in Canada to prevent further lawsuits.

Blockbuster reintroduced late fees in the United States in 2010 under the name of "Additional Daily Rates". With this pricing scheme, rentals were once again limited to a certain number of days and accrued pay-per-day rates after the days allocated are exceeded.

== Presidents and CEOs ==
- John F. Antioco, CEO: 1997–2007
- James W. Keyes, CEO: 2007–2011
- Michael Kelly, president: 2011–2015

== See also ==
- Circuit City
- GameStop
- Dish Network
- Family Video
- Gamerang
- Hollywood Video
- Movie Gallery
- Netflix
- Retail apocalypse
- List of retailers affected by the retail apocalypse
- Borders Bookstore
