= KPS =

KPS may refer to:

== Organizations ==
- Communist Party of Serbia (Serbian: Komunistička partija Srbije)
- Communist Party of Slovenia (Slovene: Komunistična partija Slovenije)
- Communist Party of Switzerland (German: Kommunistische Partei der Schweiz)
- Evangelical Church of the Church Province of Saxony (German: Evangelische Kirche der Kirchenprovinz Sachsen) (1950–2009)
- Korean Physical Society
- KPS Capital Partners, an American investment company
- KPS Video Express, a defunct Hong Kong video rental company
- Korea Plant Service & Engineering

== Other uses ==
- Kampong Som (Sihanoukville), abbreviated
- Karnofsky performance status, in medicine
- Keratic precipitate, a disease
- Kilometres per second; see metre per second
- KPS Chemik Police, a Polish volleyball club
- Potassium persulfate
- Korean Positioning System
- Kempsey Airport, IATA airport code "KPS"
