= James W. Keyes =

American businessman

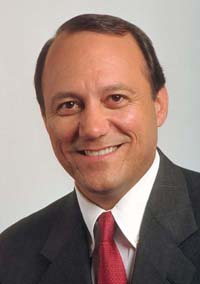
- Born: March 17, 1955 (age 71); Grafton, Massachusetts, U.S.
- Education: College of the Holy Cross (BS); Columbia University (MBA)
- Occupation: Businessman
- Years active: 1980–present
- Title: Chairman of Wild Oats Markets (2011-2016); CEO of 7-Eleven (2000–2005); CEO and chairman, Blockbuster (2007–2011)

James W. Keyes (born March 17, 1955) is an American businessman who is the chairman of Key Development LLC. Previously, Keyes was chief executive officer (CEO) of 7-Eleven and the chairman and CEO of Blockbuster.

== Early life and education ==
Keyes was born on March 17, 1955, in Grafton, Massachusetts. He was the youngest of six children. His parents were factory workers who separated when he was a child. His father, who taught him how to make deposits and withdrawals at a bank, died prematurely. Keyes was raised in central Massachusetts, where his family lived in a three-room house that lacked plumbing.

After attending Millbury High School, Keyes graduated from the College of the Holy Cross with a Bachelor of Arts, cum laude, with membership in Phi Beta Kappa. He helped to defray his expenses in college by working a shift at McDonald's. In 1980, he earned a Master of Business Administration (MBA) from Columbia Business School.

== Career ==
From 1980 to 1985, Keyes worked for the Gulf Oil Corporation (now called Chevron). Keyes joined CITGO Petroleum in 1985, which was then a subsidiary of 7-Eleven, Inc. In May 1996, he became the chief financial officer of 7-Eleven Inc. In 1998, he became chief operating officer of the company. In 2000, Keyes was appointed president and CEO of 7-Eleven, a position he held until 2005.

During his time at 7-Eleven, Keyes was responsible for introducing hundreds of new products including taquitos, aluminum beer bottles, prepaid phone cards, and V-Com ATM. Recognizing the benefits of technological advancements, Keyes implemented new retail systems technology to improve ordering, product assortment, production, and transportation in every store. This resulted in 40 consecutive quarters of improved same-store sales and 10x improvement in equity value during his CEO tenure. Keyes was inducted into the Convenience Store Industry Hall of Fame for his achievements leading the company.

He retired from 7-Eleven when it was sold to Seven & I Holdings Co.

Keyes was chairman and chief executive officer of Blockbuster, Inc., from 2007 to 2011, being brought into the company by investor and Blockbuster board member Carl Icahn. In 2007, Keyes helped Blockbuster acquire Movielink, a streaming video service, to compete with Netflix and Apple TV. Keyes chose to shift focus from online to the stores and tried to improve the company's finances through moves such as restoring late fees. Keyes attributed its struggles to having to both grow the company to please Icahn and to pay back its $1 billion in debt in 2009, which made refinancing very difficult owing to the financial crisis. Keyes led the company after it filed for bankruptcy and facilitated a sale to Dish Network.

Keyes became Chairman and CEO of Wild Oats Marketing LLC after the intellectual property was acquired in 2011 following the sale of Wild Oats to Whole Foods. He developed a line of consumer products in a strategic collaboration with Walmart creating more than 250 items offered at more than 3,000 Walmart stores. The company then acquired 180 Fresh & Easy stores (YFE, LLC) from Tesco in 2013. Keyes was CEO from 2013-2015 leading the transformation of the business and disposition of assets.

== Philanthropic & Advisory Work ==
He has been on the Board of Trustees for College of the Holy Cross since 2017 and on the Board of Overseers for the Columbia Business School since 2010. He has been a member of Dallas Symphony Association's Board of Governors since 2001, as Chairman from 2004 to 2006. Since 2005 he has been on the Board of Directors and Chairman of the Investment Committee for the Cooper Institute, a nonprofit organization dedicated to promoting health and wellness through research, education, and advocacy. He has also been on the American Red Cross-National Board of Governors and chaired the American Red Cross-National Philanthropic Board. Since 2013 he has been on the Board of Directors of Murphy USA, which operates more than 1,470 retail gas stations in 26 states. In 2026, he was granted 421 restricted stock unites under the company's 2023 Omnibus Incentive Plan, with 349 units vesting and converting into common shares. Following these transactions, he directly owned 17,705 shares of Murphy USA and 421 restricted stock unites.

Keyes co-founded Back to Space, a nonprofit organization that promotes STEM education and enrichment programs for youth, aiming to inspire interest in space exploration and related sciences.

Keyes is the founding director of the Dallas Education Foundation and is the founder of the nonprofit foundation Education is Freedom, a nationally recognized college, career and life-readiness provider. Education is Freedom has raised over $450 million for its fellowships, scholarships, and other programs to “pay it forward” to hardworking students.

== Awards ==
In 2005, Keyes received the Horatio Alger Award, which is given to leaders in the community who exemplify "honesty, hard work, self reliance and perseverance". In 2008, he was awarded the Ellis Island Medal of Honor.

In 2024, Keyes was awarded the Robert S. Folsom Leadership Award. The award is presented by Methodist Health System Foundation to recognize individuals whose demonstrated commitment and excellence in community leadership emulate the significant contributions of former Dallas Mayor Robert S. Folsom.

In 2025, he was awarded the World Affair Council of Dallas/Fort Worth H. Neil Mallon Award. The award is presented annually to individuals who have excelled at promoting the international focus of North Texas. Funds raised from this event support the Council’s public and education programming, international exchanges, and diplomatic services.
