= Blockbuster (party game) =

Cooperative party game

- The Blockbuster logo, which is the same as the party game.
- Publishers: Big Potato Games
- Publication: 2019; 7 years ago
- Genres: Party games
- Languages: English
- Players: 4-10
- Playing time: 30 minutes
- Age range: 12+

Blockbuster is a cooperative party game based on the American film rental corporation of the same name published in 2019 by Big Potato Games. The goal of the game is to get all 8 "genres cards" first, before the other team.

== Gameplay ==
There are two rounds, "Head to Head Battle" and "Quote it, Act it, One Word". The players start by drawing a "head to head card" which says something like "movies with dogs" then two player one from each team, hit the buzzer and say what ever the topic of the card is until they can't name anymore films with the topic.

A player is given three cards, each card has a film title on it. then the player hast to quote a part from the film, act it out the film without saying anything, and describe the film in one word. The other player has 30 seconds to guess them all, and every correct answer they get a movie card, which includes a genre. This is done until one of the teams get to 8 "genres cards".

== Reception ==
Benjamin Abbott of GamesRadar rated the game 5/5 stars, writing that Blockbuster "is a great way to spend your evening, especially if drinks are involved and spirits are high" while also saying that it's "not necessarily one of the best cooperative board games out there".
