= Gamerang =

American online video game rental service

Gamerang, Inc.
- Type: Private
- Industry: Rental & Sales
- Founded: September 30, 2003
- Headquarters: Santa Ana, California
- Key people: Greg Gentling, Co-Founder & CEO; Nargess Fassih, Co-Founder & COO
- Products: Video games for video game consoles
- Website: Gamerang.com

GameRang was an online video game rental service that provided game titles for multiple platforms, including handheld consoles and mobile devices.

GameRang operated its rental service similarly to online video rental services such as Netflix, Gamefly, and Blockbuster Online. Members paid a monthly fee and received video games delivered to their homes via United States Postal Service First Class Mail, using pre-paid mailers. Subscribers held the games as long as they wished and returned them at any time as long as an account was active and in good standing. Once the returned game was received by the distribution center, the next game on a user's Game Queue, which was a list of game titles prioritized in order of desired delivery, was sent. Members also were provided the option to purchase games they rented rather than send them back as well as being able to purchase new and previously played games directly from the GameRang website.

GameRang was ranked No. 2 on TopTenREVIEWS' list of Online Video Game Rentals, and site editors previously indicated that "GameRang has one of the largest and most comprehensive game libraries on the internet and with just a little more innovation, this service could be a real force to reckon with."

== History ==
GameRang was launched on September 30, 2003, by co-founder and CEO Greg Gentling, it amassed over 9,000 game titles for gaming platforms such as the Nintendo Wii, PlayStation 3, Xbox 360, PSP, Game Boy Advance, PlayStation 2, PlayStation, Nintendo DS, GameCube, and Xbox. Gamerang had four distribution sites in California, Oklahoma, Minnesota and New Jersey.

In July 2010, GameRang announced the launch of its revised site, scheduled for the end of summer 2010. This revision featured designed to improve member accessibility and interactivity through social networking sites such as Twitter, Facebook, and YouTube, as well as mobile devices.

As of June 2019, GameRang is no longer in business according to the Better Business Bureau. GameRang's website now shows archived informational posts about video games.

Stated from an article on allgamerentals.com, "With Gamerang, it's really easy to rent video games online, and it's also cheap, convenient and a great way to try tons of games."

== See also ==
- Video game
- Video rental services
- Netflix
- Blockbuster Online
