= What Next? (party game) =

Choose-your-own-adventure party game

- Designers: Ed Naujokas
- Illustrators: Sam Ailey; Beks Barnett; Zoe Lee
- Publishers: Big Potato Games
- Publication: 2021; 5 years ago
- Genres: Party game
- Players: 1–4
- Playing time: 30–60 minutes
- Age range: 10+

What Next? is a choose-your-own-adventure party game designed by Ed Naujokas and published in 2021 by Big Potato Games. Players decide their story paths and complete dexterity-based challenges to finish pre-made adventures before the "Tower of Peril" (a stack of oddly shaped game pieces) collapses.

== Gameplay ==
All players work together, attempting to navigate through the adventure and make it to the end of the story by reading location cards, completing event cards, and by picking up item cards along the way. The game works similar to a gamebook.

On each player's turn the next location card is turned over and read, then all players must choose which path to take next. If the card contains an event, the player reading the card must complete a dexterity challenge determined by the card. At the start of each turn, a time wheel is rotated clockwise. Each event card has an easier day side and a harder night side, and the corresponding side is completed depending on the time of day shown on the time wheel. If the challenge is successfully completed, players proceed with their action. If it's failed, players follow a more punishing route and the reading player must stack a piece on the Tower of Peril. If the Tower of Peril collapses before the end of the adventure, the game is lost. The game is won if players are successfully able to complete the adventure before collapsing the tower.

== Reception ==
Matt Thrower, writing for IGN, praised What Next? for its unique mix of genres and gameplay but criticized the game for its limited replayability. In an article for The Independent, Lauren Cunningham rated the game 4/5 stars, writing that "It’s fun alone but also works well in a group of four as an accessible party game that’s simple to set up." What Next? was included in Screen Rant's 2022 list of "Most Beautiful Games", with Lauren Beach describing the game's pros as its collaborative gameplay, ability for solo play, and artwork, and but noting that no timer was included for timed mini-games.
