= The Chameleon (party game) =

Party game

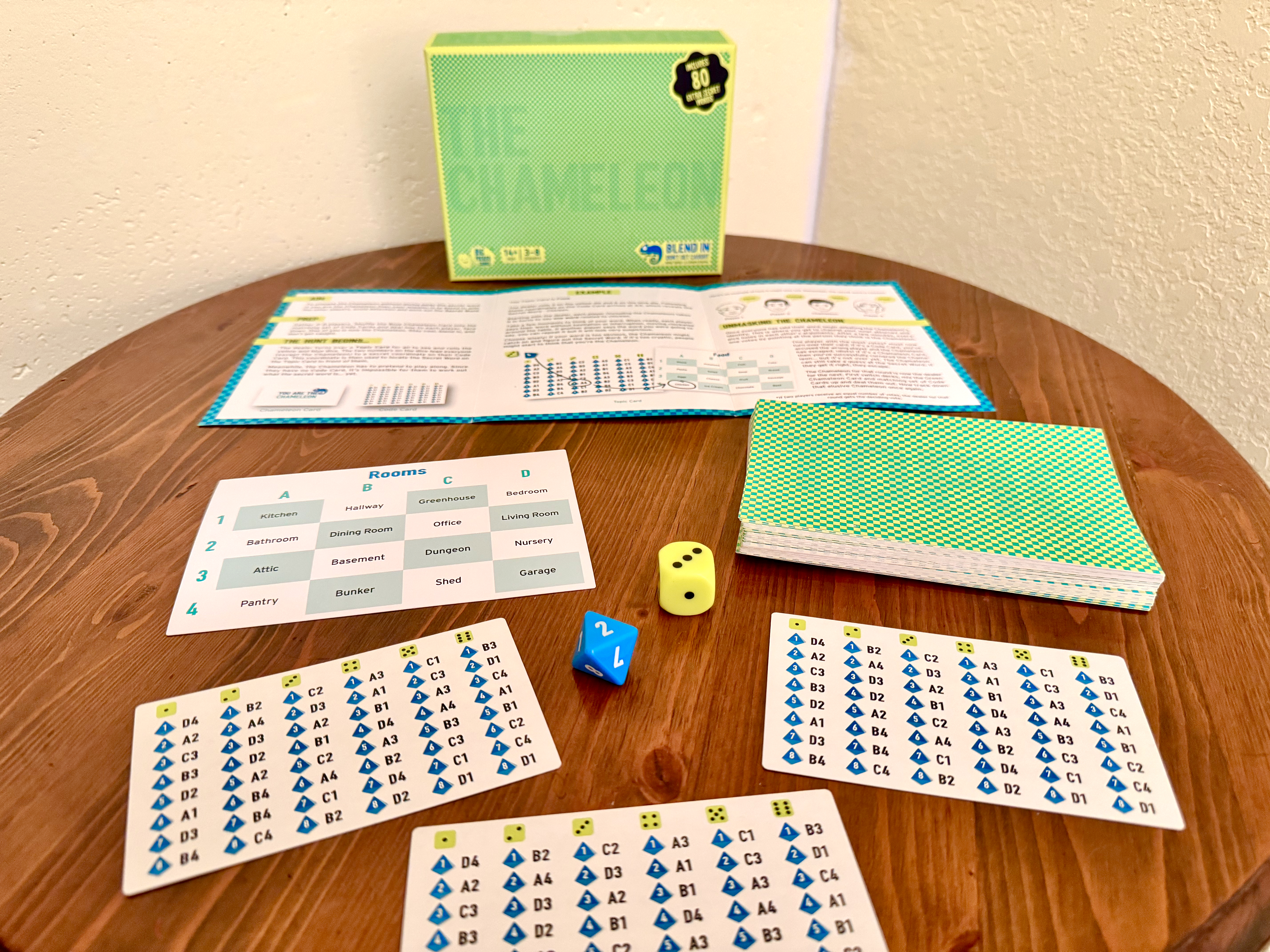
- Designers: Rikki Tahta
- Illustrators: Ben Drummond; Zoe Lee
- Publishers: Big Potato Games
- Publication: 2017; 9 years ago
- Genres: Bluffing games; Party games; Social deduction games
- Languages: English
- Players: 3–8
- Playing time: 15 minutes
- Age range: 12+

The Chameleon is a social deduction based party game designed by Rikki Tahta and published in 2017 by Big Potato Games. All players except one—the "Chameleon"—are given a secret topic and attempt to identify the Chameleon, while the Chameleon attempts to identify the topic, using social deduction.

== Gameplay ==
At the start of each round, a Topic Card containing different topics is placed in the middle for all players to see. Each player is given a Code Card which contains coordinate values. A yellow six-sided die and a blue eight-sided die are rolled. The values correspond to a coordinate on the Code Cards, which can then be used to locate a secret topic on the Topic Card. One player secretly receives a Chameleon card instead of a Code Card, and does not know the secret topic.

Every player takes a turn saying a word related to the Topic Card, including the Chameleon. Players debate and vote on the Chameleon's identity based on the words given and the player with the most votes flips over their card. If the card flipped is a Code Card, the Chameleon wins the round. If it is a Chameleon Card, the Chameleon gets a chance to guess the secret topic. They win if their guess is correct, otherwise all other players are the winners.

There is an optional scoring system in which the Chameleon scores two points for if a Code Card is flipped and one point if their card is flipped but they can guess the secret topic, and everyone else scores two points only if the Chameleon Card is flipped and the Chameleon guess incorrectly. The first player to five points wins.

== Reception ==
Simon Hill of Wired recommended the game for its quick and easy gameplay, while noting that some topics can be difficult for younger children. Wirecutter described the game as a "great introduction to social deduction games" due to its simple rules and strategic possibilities. Lauren Orsini, writing for Forbes, noted that "the beauty of The Chameleon lies in how minimal it is. Anyone can pick it up without even reading the instructions". Benjamin Abbott of GamesRadar+ wrote that the game is "quick, easy to understand" and "very replayable". The Chameleon was the winner of the 2017 UK Games Expo award for Best Party Game.
