= Rhino Video Games =

American video game retailer

- Company type: Subsidiary
- Industry: Retail
- Founded: 1989; 37 years ago, in Ocala, Florida, United States
- Founder: Mike Vorce; Bruce Ruckle
- Defunct: January 14, 2007; 19 years ago
- Fate: Merged into GameStop
- Headquarters: Gainesville, Florida, United States
- Area served: United States (southeastern)
- Key people: Kelly Sharp (Senior Vice President); Tully McQueen (Vice President of Operations)
- Products: Video games; Consoles; Accessories
- Parent: Blockbuster (2004-2007)
- Website: RhinoVideoGames.com (archive)

Rhino Video Games was an American video game retailer based in Gainesville, Florida, that specialized in selling new and used video game software. It was the first retailer in the southeastern United States to specialize in selling and trading video games. Rhino operated more than 90 games stores in fifteen states. It was acquired by Blockbuster in 2004, and then by GameStop in 2007.

== History ==
In 1982, Rhino Video Games founder Mike Vorce graduated from the University of Florida with a degree in Agriculture and moved to Immokalee, Florida, to manage produce operations on a large farm. In 1984, after two years on the farm, he sought a career change. Believing that video rental shops represented a significant business opportunity, he relocated to McIntosh, and opened Video Plus, a small movie rental shop. He later opened a second location in Anthony, and relocated the original store to Dunnellon.

In 1988, following the successful launch of the Nintendo Entertainment System, Vorce developed a strong interest in video games. He began renting the system and related games at his Video Plus stores, where demand proved exceptionally high and quickly became the stores' most popular offering. This success led to the founding of Rhino Video Games in 1989. Vorce, together with early employee Bruce Ruckle, opened the first Rhino Video Games store in a 1,200-square-foot space on Silver Springs Boulevard in Ocala. It was the first retail storefront in the southeastern United States dedicated exclusively to the purchase, sale, trade, and rental of video games and systems.

A second store opened in 1992 in Gainesville, near the University of Florida, and its strong performance supported further expansion. That year, Kelly Sharp joined the company as a store employee. Sharp, who had a background in banking, advanced through multiple roles and eventually became Senior Vice President. In 1995, Vorce sold the remaining Video Plus stores to focus entirely on Rhino Video Games. That same year, Bruce Ruckle left the company. In 1997, Tully McQueen joined Rhino. A former customer and Blockbuster employee with management experience, McQueen helped establish standardized operating procedures and build a strong team. He eventually became Vice President of Operations. Also in 1997, all Rhino stores ceased game rentals to concentrate on refining the game-trading business model.

Between 1998 and 1999, the company opened and closed four stores while testing various locations, sizes, and layouts. Although these experiments were necessary to develop an effective store format, they placed the company under considerable financial pressure. In 2000, after refining its concept, Rhino entered a period of sustained expansion. That year, it opened its first store outside Florida, in Hinesville, Georgia. In 2001, Rhino established its first major corporate offices in a warehouse complex in Gainesville, and grew to ten stores. In 2002, it opened a distribution center adjacent to the corporate offices and increased to seventeen stores. By 2003, the company operated thirty-five stores. On May 17, 2004, Blockbuster, Inc. acquired the assets of Rhino Video Games. Mike Vorce and his team remained with the company to manage daily operations. By this year, Rhino Video Games employed more than 400 people and operated fifty-four stores across nine states, with additional locations planned.

On January 4, 2007, Rhino Video Games was acquired by GameStop and all stores were renamed by January 14th.
