= Tilt 'N' Shout =

2024 party game

- Designers: Gary Pyper
- Illustrators: Zoe Lee
- Publishers: Big Potato Games
- Publication: 2024
- Genres: Party game
- Players: 2+
- Playing time: 15–20 minutes
- Age range: 10+

Tilt 'N' Shout is a party game designed by Gary Pyper, illustrated by Zoe Lee, and published by Big Potato Games in 2024. Players or teams alternate naming examples belonging to a category while controlling a seesaw-shaped marble timer. The game received the WITTY Prize at the 2025 UK Toy Inventors' Dinner.

== Gameplay ==
Tilt 'N' Shout can be played head-to-head by two players or by two teams. At the beginning of a round, three category cards are placed symbol-side up. A player selects one of the cards and turns it over to reveal the category for the round.

The two sides alternate naming examples belonging to the selected category. After giving an answer, a player presses their side of the seesaw, causing the metal ball to travel towards their scoring zone. The opposing side must provide another valid answer and reverse the seesaw before the ball reaches the end of the track. A side loses the round when it cannot provide an answer before the ball falls into the opposing scoring zone.

Answers that are incorrect, repeated or disputed can be challenged. During a challenge, the seesaw is returned to a neutral position while the players decide whether the answer should be accepted.

After winning a round, a side advances its scoring block beneath the seesaw. The block restricts the angle at which the winning side can tilt the timer, causing the ball to travel more slowly and giving the trailing side additional time to answer. A side wins the game by winning a round after its scoring block has reached the final position.

== Reception and recognition ==
Toys, Tots, Pets & More awarded Tilt 'N' Shout five out of five stars. The publication praised its quick setup, fast-paced exchanges and variety of category cards.

Jim Gamer of What Board Game gave the game a score of 8 out of 10. He praised its accessibility, visual presentation and combination of category knowledge, time pressure and social interaction. He noted that the time-pressure element may not appeal to all players.

Writing for the Spanish newspaper Nueva Tribuna, Pablo D. Santonja highlighted the tension created by the seesaw timer. He described the rules as quick to explain and considered the game accessible to casual players and suitable for parties.

Martine Asselin of Meeple QC described the game as fast, accessible and intergenerational, and praised its ability to create an energetic atmosphere among players. She considered it best suited to groups of four to eight players and said its 150 cards provided an acceptable level of replayability.

In January 2025, Tilt 'N' Shout received the Winning Inventor Toy of the Year (WITTY) Prize at the UK Toy Inventors' Dinner.
