= Herd Mentality (party game) =

2020 party game

- Publishers: Big Potato Games
- Publication: 2020; 6 years ago
- Genres: Party games
- Languages: English
- Players: 4–20
- Playing time: 15-20 minutes
- Age range: 10+

Herd Mentality is a party game published in 2020 by Big Potato Games. The goal of the game is to be the first person to get 8 points.

== Gameplay ==
A card is drawn that has a subjective question like "what is the best sauce?". The players have to try to give an answer that is the same as everyone else's. If a player's answer is in the majority, that player gets a "cow" (points). If everyone's answer is the same, except from one, that player gets a "pink cow". If they have the cow, they can't win. This is done until someone gets 8 points.

== Reception ==
Benjamin Abbott of GamesRadar+, rated the game 4/5 stars, writing that "You won't find a better ice-breaker" and that "Herd Mentality is perfect for starting conversations". Keith Stuart of The Guardian, said "It's a really lighthearted game that ends up telling you a lot about people's likes and dislikes". Clayton Ashley of Polygon, said "[...] it's a whole lot of fun discovering how everyone approaches the questions in the game".
