= Sounds Fishy (party game) =

- Designers: Rob Piesse
- Illustrators: Robin Sowden García
- Publishers: Big Potato Games
- Publication: 2022
- Genres: Bluffing party game
- Players: 4–10
- Playing time: 15–20 minutes
- Age range: 10+

Sounds Fishy is a bluffing party game designed by Rob Piesse, illustrated by Robin Sowden García and published by Big Potato Games in 2022. Players take turns attempting to distinguish improvised false answers from the correct response to unusual questions.

The game is designed for four to ten players aged 10 and over, with a typical playing time of approximately 15 to 20 minutes. It was a runner-up for Best Party Game at the 2022 Tabletop Gaming Awards and won the Games category at the 2023 Gift of the Year Awards.

== Gameplay ==
At the beginning of each round, one player becomes the guesser. The remaining players receive face-down fish tokens. One token represents the "True Blue Kipper", while the others represent "Red Herrings". The guesser draws a card and reads its question without seeing the printed answer. The other players can see both the question and its correct answer.

Players holding Red Herring tokens have 15 seconds to invent plausible false answers. The player holding the True Blue Kipper gives the correct answer while attempting to make it sound fabricated.

After hearing all the responses, the guesser turns over the fish tokens one at a time, attempting to identify the Red Herrings before selecting the True Blue Kipper. Each correctly identified Red Herring earns the guesser a point. The guesser may stop at any time and bank the points accumulated during the round. Revealing the True Blue Kipper before all the Red Herrings have been identified ends the turn and causes the guesser to lose the unbanked points from that round.

The other players score when their answers successfully mislead the guesser. The role of guesser rotates after each round. In a game with four or five players, each participant serves as the guesser twice; with six or more players, each participant serves once. The player with the highest total score at the end of the scheduled rounds wins.

== Release ==
The game's Gift of the Year Awards entry records its launch date as 4 July 2022. In June 2022, ICv2 reported that Sounds Fishy was scheduled for release in the United States in spring 2023.

== Reception ==
Charlie Pettit of Tabletop Gaming praised the game's unusual questions and the interaction created by the players' improvised answers. Pettit described it as easy to learn and well suited to group play, while finding its scoring system initially counterintuitive.

Benjamin Abbott of GamesRadar+ praised the game's accessibility, short playing time and visual presentation. Abbott described it as easy to explain and suitable for people new to board games, while considering it comparatively light on depth and better suited to larger groups.

Simon Hill included Sounds Fishy in Wired's guide to family board games. Hill described it as a fun group game and found that it became both more entertaining and more difficult when played with a larger number of people.

== Awards and nominations ==
Year	Award	Category	Result	Reference
2022	Tabletop Gaming Awards	Best Party Game	Runner-up	
2023	Gift of the Year Awards	Games	Winner	
