= Chicken vs. Hotdog =

2022 party dexterity game

Chicken vs Hotdog
- Designers: Dominic Yard and Big Potato Games
- Illustrators: Beks Barnett
- Publishers: Big Potato Games
- Publication: 2022
- Genres: Party game, dexterity game
- Players: 2+
- Playing time: 15–20 minutes
- Age range: 8+

Chicken vs Hotdog is a party dexterity game designed by Dominic Yard and Big Potato Games, illustrated by Beks Barnett and published by Big Potato Games in 2022. Players divide into chicken and hotdog teams and bid for opportunities to complete challenges involving the flipping and landing of character-shaped playing pieces.

The game is designed for two to ten players aged eight and over, with a typical playing time of approximately 15 to 20 minutes. It won the WITTY Prize for Inventor Toy of the Year in 2023 and was a finalist for Grown-Up Toy of the Year at the 2023 Toy of the Year Awards.

== Gameplay ==
Players divide into two opposing teams, Team Chicken and Team Hotdog. Each team receives a chicken- or hotdog-shaped playing piece known as a Sling'Em, six matching character cards and a hand of numbered bidding cards. The character cards begin grey-side up and collectively form an image of the team's character when turned over.

At the beginning of each round, a challenge card is revealed. The card instructs a player to flip the team's Sling'Em in a particular way and states the number of attempts allowed. Challenges include flipping the piece over a shoulder, beneath an arm or with the player's eyes closed.

Both teams secretly select a bidding card and reveal them simultaneously. The team with the higher bid must attempt the challenge. A successful attempt allows that team to turn over one of its character cards, while a failed attempt allows the opposing team to turn over one of its cards. Used bidding cards are discarded and replaced after a team exhausts its hand.

If both teams reveal bidding cards of the same value, the game enters a tie-break called "Flipperama", in which the teams race to land their Sling'Ems. The first team to turn over all six of its character cards wins the game.

The game also includes a two-player variant called Duelling Sling'Ems. The players stand several feet apart and attempt to land their Sling'Em near the opposing player, with the first player to score three points winning.

== Release ==
Chicken vs Hotdog was released in the United Kingdom in 2022. The concept was inspired by the bottle-flipping trend and was developed over a period of several years.

The game received a wider United States release in 2023 through retailers including Target and Walmart.

== Awards and nominations ==
Year	Award	Category	Result	Reference
2022	Play Creators Awards	Game Designer of the Year – Party Game	Finalist	
2023	UK Toy Inventors' Dinner WITTY Prize	Inventor Toy of the Year	Winner	
2023	Toy of the Year Awards	Grown-Up Toy of the Year	Finalist	
