= KPS Video Express =

Hong Kong–based multimedia store

KPS Video Express (金獅影視超特店)
- Type: Defunct
- Industry: Rental and Sales
- Founded: 1981–1998
- Founder: Garrie and Kitty Roman
- Headquarters: Hong Kong
- Key people: Garrie and Kitty Roman
- Products: VHS video, DVD, LaserDisc, Video CD, Audio CD, audio cassettes and Software Rental and Sales
- Net income: US$100 million (HK$774 million) in 1996
- Number of employees: ~1,000 in 1997
- Website: Formerly http://www.kps.com.hk

KPS Video Express (金獅影視超特店) was a Hong Kong–based multimedia store which sold and rented videos, CDs and movies. It was established in 1981 by Garrie and Kitty Roman, and by 1997 expanded to 39 stores with 450,000 members. It also had stores in Taiwan, with further plans to expand in the Asian region.

During the Asian Economic Crisis the company suffered, and went into receivership in 1998. It was later bought out by American video-chain Blockbuster.

== History ==
KPS Video Express originally started in 1981 as a kiosk at the back of a Nathan Road electrical shop. Husband and wife Garrie and Kitty Roman built up a selection of Western and Chinese films on VHS tape which would be rented out for HK$15.

The business was successful, and by 1982 Kam Production Studios, named after Kam Kui International Holdings chairman K. K. Leung, backed the company and it became KPS Video Network, originally opening seven kiosks. It was renamed KPS Retail Stores Ltd in 1987.

By 1992, KPS also offered LaserDiscs for sale and rent in addition to VHS tapes, as well as computer software, audio CDs and CD-ROM drives. A 8,000 square feet (740 m^{2}) test store was opened in Causeway Bay in the same year in order to experiment with the merging of these products under one roof. It was successful, and was subsequently followed in 1994 by a superstore at Chong Hing Square at 601 Nathan Road, Mongkok, which occupied 155,000 square feet (14,400 m^{2}). It offered 73,000 CDs in stock and 17,000 titles for rent. Among these titles, there were over 12,500 laser discs for sale and rent while 6,000 VHS tapes were for sale and 37,000 were available for rent.

In 1994, KPS first introduced camera and magnetic theft-detection systems in its megastores. It also used a computer-based procurement system to accurately forecast demand, as well as keep track of current stock and trends.

By 1995, local newspapers reported plans for expansion beyond Hong Kong to locations in other Asian countries. By this time, KPS owned 35% of the Hong Kong video-rental market, had a customer base of 250,000 and was earning HK$36 million. KPS announced that it had teamed up with ChinaVest, an American direct-investment company to expand into Taiwan. ChinaVest pumped US$26 million into the venture. Initial plans were to launch 100 stores in Taiwan within three years, with megastores between 360 and 1,350 square meters offering videos on tape and laserdiscs for sale and rent, as well as music products and computer software. It also planned to expand to South Korea and open 500 stores, 12 stores in Singapore and 55 stores in Malaysia, and plans for stores in Thailand.

In 1996 turnover hit US$100 million ($184 million in 2024) (HK$774 million) and KPS won the DHL/South China Morning Post Enterprise Award that year. In the same year, Garrie Roman sold his stake, but remained on the board and involved in operations.

By 1997, KPS had 39 stores in Hong Kong and 5 megastores in Taiwan, with plans to continue expanding giving 100 stores in Hong Kong within two years, and 30 in Taiwan by the end of 1997. By that time, it had a customer base of 450,000 members in Hong Kong and employed around 1,000 people. Long-term plans included expanding to 1,050 stores in the region by 2005.

== Decline and collapse ==
By 1997, the company was experiencing mounting financial problems caused by several factors. Unauthorized commercial-scale copying of CDs contributed significantly to its decline; in 1998, legitimate retailers were estimated to have lost HK$900 million to counterfeiters. The Asian Economic Crisis was also a major factor, as it led to reduced consumer spending. By the end of 1997, KPS had incurred losses estimated at HK$12 million.

Parallel imports of films intended for overseas markets were banned when the Copyright Ordinance became law on 1 July 1997, cutting product availability by 30 per cent.

At the same time, the company's rapid but undisciplined expansion placed significant strain on its finances, as new stores were opened without proper analysis of location or feasibility. Some outlets were established within walking distance of one another, while funding for the expansion came largely from the sale of pre-paid coupons. Members were offered special deals to purchase coupon packages, which were then used for video rentals.

In May 1998, rumours that KPS was close to collapse circulated on the internet, triggering panic rentals and the lack of confidence caused coupon sales to plunge. The collapse of Maria's Bakery, who were unable to fulfil their pre-paid coupon commitments, also led consumers to lose faith in the coupon system.

On 23 June 1998, KPS announced a Coupon Burn campaign, under which customers were given until 1 August 1998 to redeem coupons for rentals or convert them into purchase discounts, with two coupons equivalent to HK$25 on purchases over HK$100. For rentals, the top 150 titles were excluded from the offer. Alternatively, five coupons could be redeemed to purchase a used videotape, or ten coupons to purchase a second-hand LaserDisc. Customers also received a blank video tape for every 18 coupon rentals and promised a grace period of up to four months for those with large numbers of coupons. From that point on, a cash-only system would be introduced in which video rentals would cost between HK$20 and HK$25, while members would receive a 20% discount off that price. The price was still higher than the average price for a coupon.

Customers complained to the Consumer Council because of the change of terms and conditions in the coupons, while several cases were brought to the Small Claims Tribunal to claim a refund on unused coupons. KPS attempted to settle out-of-court with offers to extend the coupon validity, but the offer was rejected by claimants. The four claimants won their lawsuit on 23 October 1998, and KPS was forced to refund the coupons, opening possible floodgates for further claims. KPS blamed the ruling for sealing the fate of the company when talks with a major corporation about a takeover broke down amid the strife. The Consumer Council also backed actions by consumers, and used the Consumer Legal Action Fund to help consumers seek redress. A total of 2,400 complaints worth HKD$1.5 million were received.

KPS Founder Garrie Roman was asked to leave by the board in November 1998 after his decision in June of the same year to fire Chief Executive Officer Rodney Miles. In the same month KPS went into receivership after rulings to repay coupons to claimants.

== Post-collapse ==
Even prior to the collapse of KPS, employees were kept in the dark by management, relying on the news and rumours. Many sought new jobs among the uncertainty. When the firm went into receivership, 430 jobs were lost. The Legal Aid Department petitioned the High Court to wind up KPS's operations so that former employees made redundant by its closure could claim ex gratia payments from the Labour Department under the Protection of Wages on Insolvency Fund. Payments were scheduled to be made on 28 January 1999, but the winding-up of KPS was delayed due to technical issues.

After the collapse, criminal organisations took advantage of the vacuum left by KPS and sold millions of dollars' worth of unlicensed video CDs

KPS was formally dissolved on 8 May 2003.

== Takeover by Blockbuster ==
American video-chain Blockbuster saw an opportunity to enter into the Hong Kong market, and entered into negotiations with KPS's receivers Ernst and Young to buy their operations. Blockbuster re-opened 15 out of 38 former KPS stores by 16 February 1998, and re-employed 145 former KPS staff. KPS members were given special offers to join Blockbuster, but the video pre-paid coupon system was not retained.

Blockbuster pulled out of the market in 2004 after high operating costs and losses to copyright infringement.

== Charity work ==
KPS was active in charity work, raising money for causes including Operation Santa Claus. In 1993, KPS was the biggest sponsors of the event, raising HK$430,000.

In 1995, KPS sponsored the KPS Video Challenge for Operation Santa Claus, in which two teams of celebrities were quizzed on their knowledge of films by Hong Kong Today presenter Hugh Chiverton at the former Furama Hotel to raise money for Sowers Action and Youth Outreach. The company also encouraged individual donations, in which the biggest donor in each store would be awarded 99 video rental coupons, while the biggest donor in Hong Kong received 999 coupons. In addition, KPS sold videos donated by its suppliers and forwarded the proceeds directly to Operation Santa Claus. That year, the video chain raised more than HK$472,000 on Christmas Day by renting videos at HK$8 per tape instead of HK$24. A further HK$14,220 was collected from donation boxes in stores, while the chain itself donated an additional HK$14,000, bringing the overall total to HK$500,000.

== Legacy ==
KPS was the only major video rental store in Hong Kong to gain a majority of the market. At present, no other video store has come close to its market share, and due to losses caused by copyright violations, there has been no attempt to recreate a multimedia store the size of KPS.
