= Movielink =

Video on demand service

- Type: Private
- Industry: Video on demand
- Founded: August 2001
- Defunct: December 16, 2008
- Parent: 2001-2008: Paramount Pictures; Paramount Network Television; Sony Pictures Entertainment; Metro-Goldwyn-Mayer; Universal Studios; Warner Bros; Since 2008: Blockbuster

Movielink was a web-based video on demand (VOD) and electronic sell-through (EST) service offering movies, television shows, and other videos for rental or purchase. While it was only available to users in the United States, it was the first company in the world to offer legally downloadable movies from major studios.

== History ==
The joint-venture Movielink was created in August 2001 by Paramount Pictures, Paramount Network Television, Sony Pictures Entertainment, Metro-Goldwyn-Mayer, Universal Studios, Warner Bros. Entertainment. Movielink was launched on November 12, 2002. Prices for viewing a movie ranged from $1.99 to $4.99.

The US Department of Justice Antitrust Division investigated Movielink in 2004 and found no monopoly issues with Movielink's distribution model. In April 2006, Brokeback Mountain was the first movie ever to be released in DVD and (legally) online at the same time, on Movielink.

On June 1, 2006, it was revealed that Movielink's owners were looking to sell the company. This came shortly after numerous studios announced their intent to work with a range of potential Movielink competitors, such as Amazon.com, Apple Computer, BitTorrent Inc., Jaman, and Microsoft Xbox. Netflix launched its streaming service in January 2007.

On August 8, 2007, Blockbuster purchased Movielink for $6.6 million. The acquisition gave Blockbuster a leading position in the emerging movie streaming arena almost overnight. It was announced that parts of the Movielink service would be migrated to blockbuster.com. Blockbuster CEO said "The popularity of (online rentals) convinced us that customers are ready for more convenient forms of digital delivery that we think Blockbuster can successfully enter."

On December 16, 2008, the Movielink website was shut down. The site was re-directed to the Blockbuster home page. Customers were notified 30 days in advance that all movies rented or purchased prior to the shutdown date must be downloaded by no later than 12/15/08 11:59 P.M. Pacific Time.

In January 2009, it was reported that, after beta-testing Movielink's technology on blockbuster.com, the test did not make it to production and Movielink's technology was trashed altogether, although Blockbuster kept Movielink's catalog deals.

== Description ==
Movielink drew its content offerings from the libraries of Paramount Pictures, Paramount Network Television, Sony Pictures Entertainment, Metro-Goldwyn-Mayer, Universal Studios, Warner Bros. Entertainment, Buena Vista Pictures (including Miramax), Twentieth Century Fox, Twentieth Television, Koch Entertainment and others on a non-exclusive basis.

Movielink used digital rights management software from Microsoft and RealNetworks to protect their content. Consequently, compatibility was limited to Intel-based computers running Microsoft Windows 2000, XP, or Vista and Windows Media Player version 9 or later.

In general, movies obtained through Movielink could only be viewed on the computer or a television set connected to the computer from which the movie was purchased. However, consumer electronics devices such as the Xbox 360 game console also allowed users to more easily view these digital media on a traditional television screen. Also, Movielink had deals with certain set top box companies to offer its movies downloaded directly to people's televisions (including AT&T's Homezone product). Experimentation with other business models was underway, including a feature which allowed users to purchase, download, and burn a DVD of a selected film.
