= Wagga Wagga Marketplace =

Shopping mall in New South Wales, Australia

Coordinates: 35°6′54″S 147°22′17″E

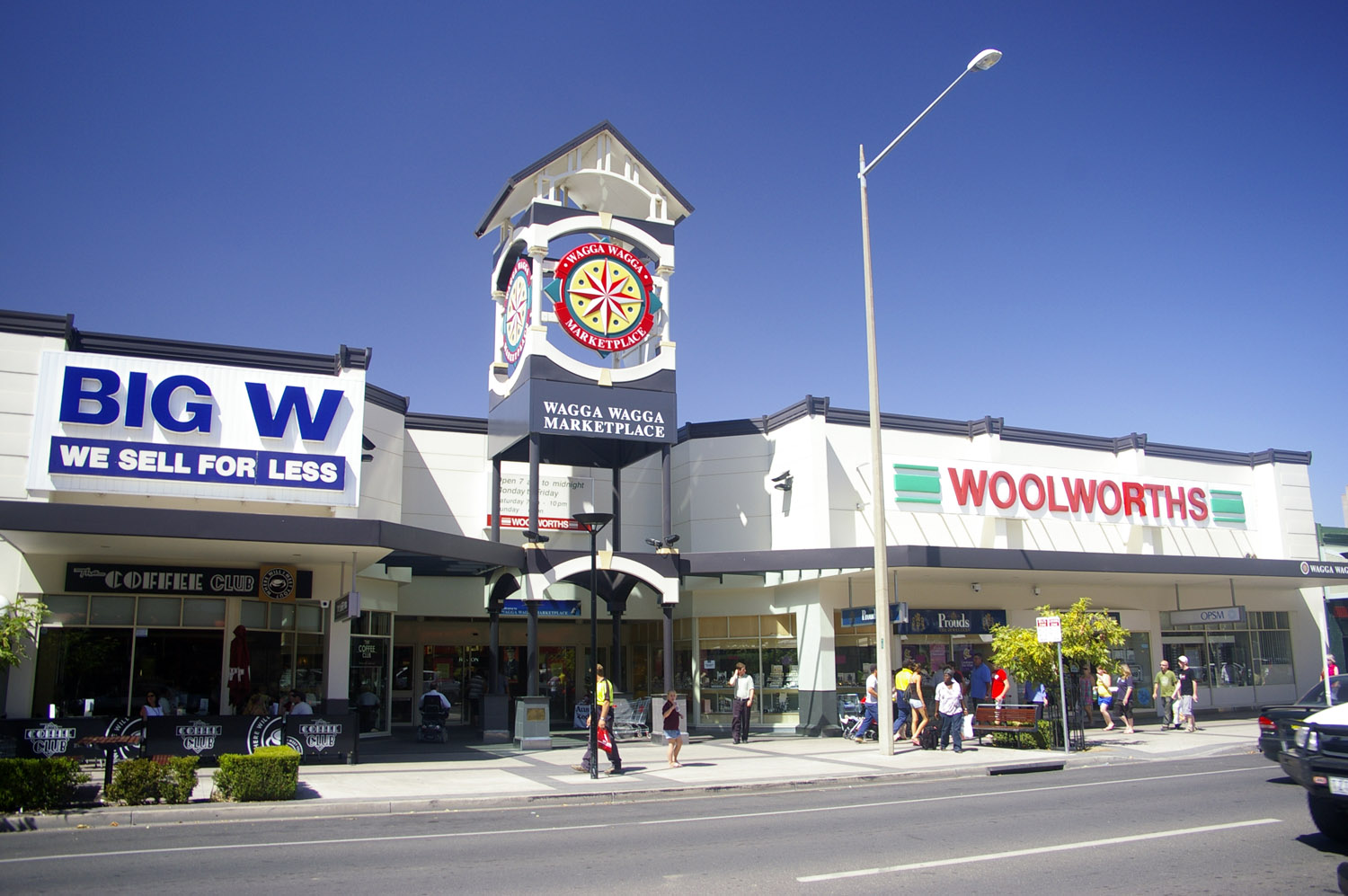
- Baylis Street entrance
- Location: Wagga Wagga, New South Wales
- Opened: 28 October 1996 (Stage 1 opening); 17 March 1997 (Stages 2 & 3, official opening)
- Developer: Woolworths Limited
- Owner: IFM Investors
- Architect: James Thiessen & Associates
- Num. of stores: 71
- Num. of anchor tenants: 3 (Big W, Australia Post and Woolworths)
- Floor area: 21,000m²
- Floors: 1
- Website: www.waggamarketplace.com

Wagga Wagga Marketplace is a shopping centre located in the regional city of Wagga Wagga in the Riverina region of New South Wales, Australia. The centre is located in Wagga's CBD with the main entrance on Baylis Street, with other entrances from Forsyth Street, Morgan Street and the underground carpark. The anchor tenants of the centre are Woolworths, Big W and Australia Post. There are also over 60 specialty stores and an undercover carpark. Wagga Wagga Marketplace was originally constructed by Woolworths and was acquired by Industry Superannuation Property Trust (ISPT) in July 1997.

In February 2006, the shopping centre underwent a refurbishment which include repainting and new signage, these upgrades were complete by May of the same year.

== Expansion ==
In July 2012, ISPT lodged a development application with Wagga Wagga City Council to expand the centre on site of the open-air car park located on Forsyth Street. The expansion would add an additional sixteen stores and see the centre become a circular type shopping centre and the underground car park expanded.

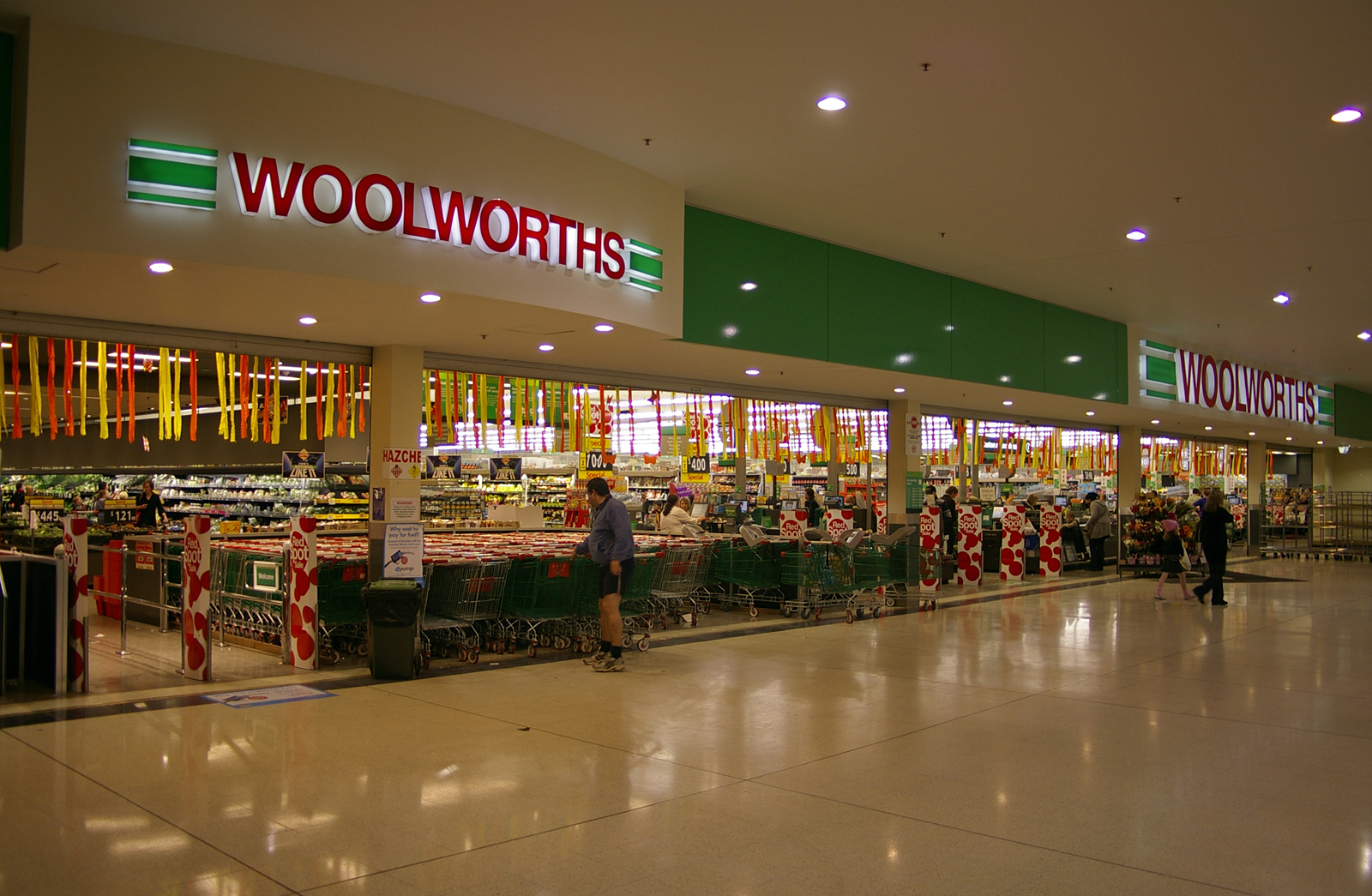
The Woolworths supermarket inside the Wagga Marketplace

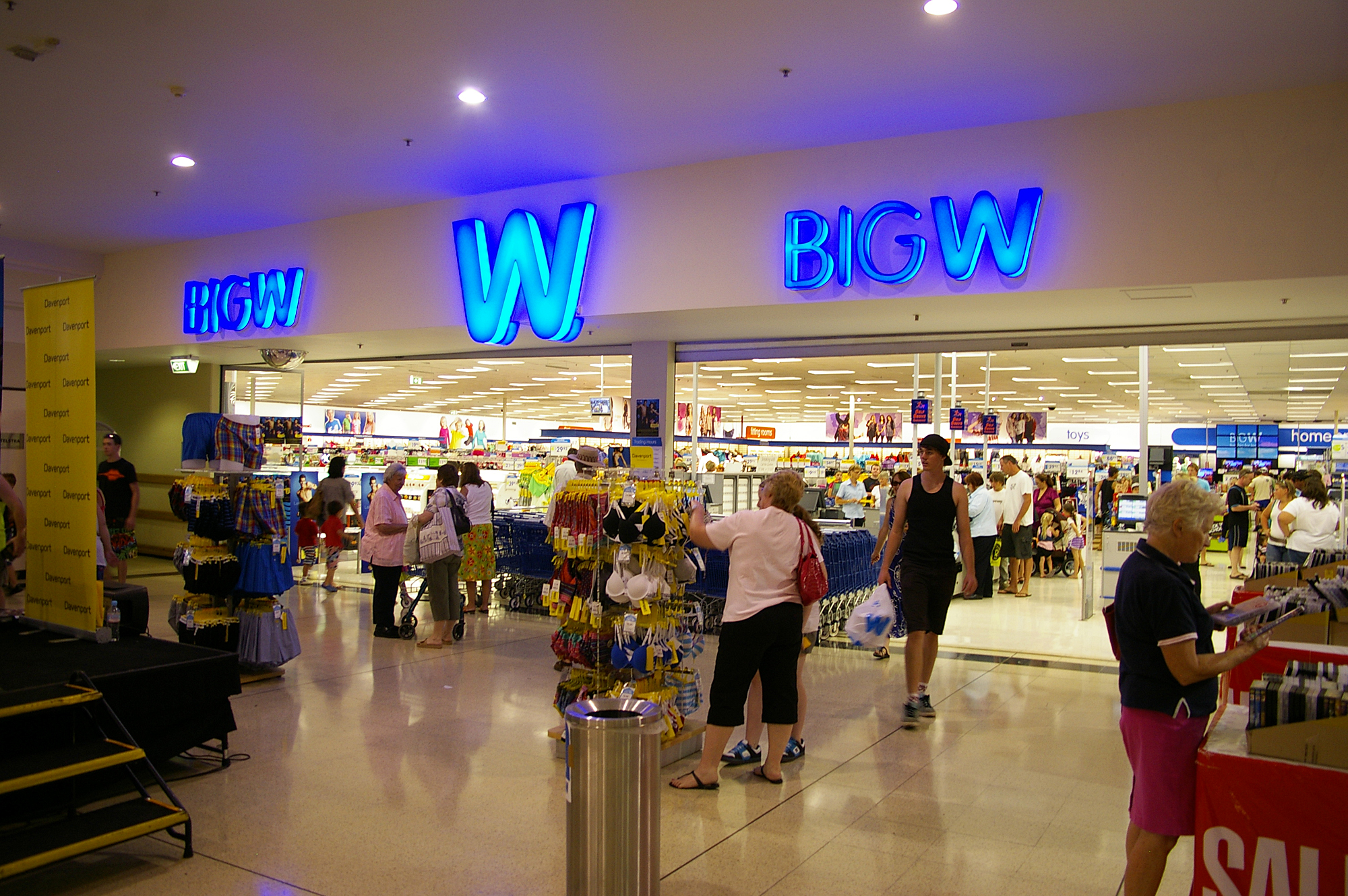
The Big W storefront inside the Wagga Marketplace
