= United Video =

New Zealand home video rental business

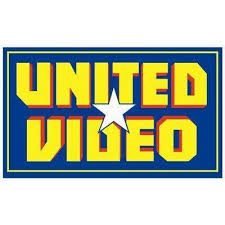
- Company type: Subsidiary
- Industry: Home entertainment
- Founded: 1984; 42 years ago
- Area served: New Zealand
- Services: Home video rentals
- Parent: The Entertainers Limited (defunct as of 2020)
- Website: http://unitedvideo.co.nz

United Video is a New Zealand home video rental business that offered DVDs to rent and sell. The company was founded in 1984 and acquired by The Entertainers Limited in 2001. United Video went into liquidation in 2015. At its peak, United Video had over 100 stores throughout New Zealand. By the early 2020s, the company had declined due to competition from streaming services. By 2024, United Video was reduced to two stores in Morrinsville and Masterton.

== History ==
The company was founded in 1984. It originally had three stores and later expanded to 77 stores by 2001. That same year, it was sold to The Entertainers Limited.

In 2015 the United Video company would go into liquidation. In 2020 their parent company The Entertainers Limited ceased operations.

At its peak, United Video had over 100 stores in New Zealand. However, the company and other video rental chains like Video Ezy had declined due to competition from streaming platforms and the economic impact of the COVID-19 pandemic, leading to the closure of numerous branches. By 2021, the company had been reduced to seven stores stretching from Whangārei to Invercargill. On 8 May, United Video closed its New Brighton and Te Puke stores, reducing its network to five stores.

In mid August 2023, the company closed its Invercargill store, its last South Island store. By 2024, United Video had been reduced to two stores in Morrinsville and Masterton.

== United Video Racing ==
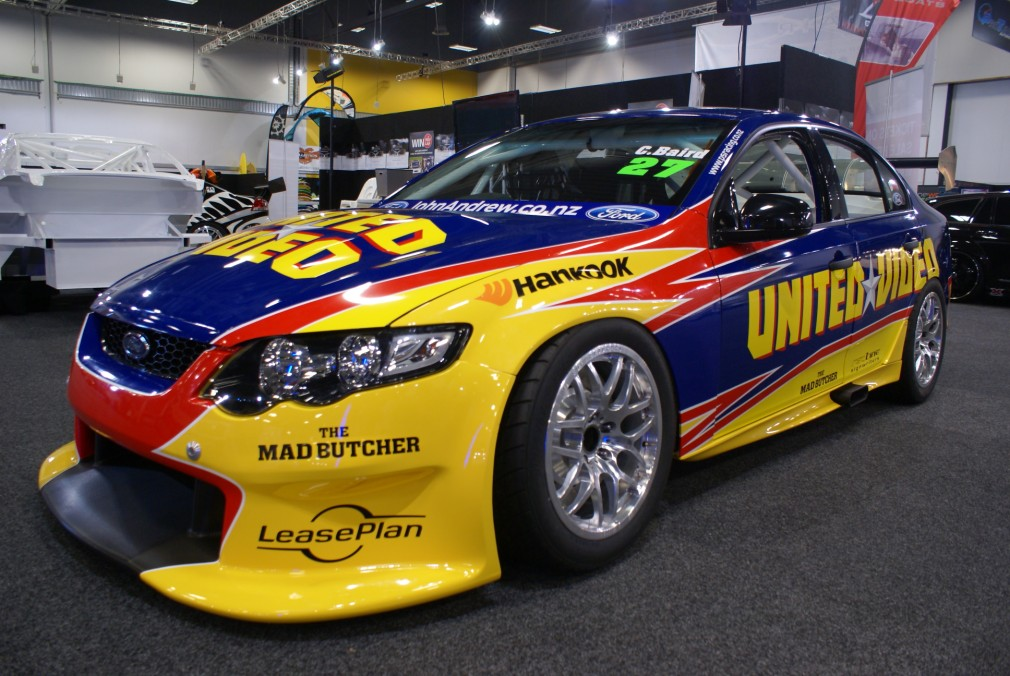
United Video Ford V8 SuperTourer of Craig Baird

United Video had a racing team that competed in V8 races around New Zealand. One of their racers Craig Baird won the BNT V8s championship in 2011.
