= Big Potato Games =

British board game publisher

- Type: Private
- Industry: Board games
- Founded: 30 June 2014; 12 years ago
- Founders: Dean Tempest, Ben Drummond, Tristan Hyatt-Williams
- Headquarters: London, England
- Products: Party games, family games

Big Potato Games is a British board game publisher based in London, England. Founded in 2014 by Dean Tempest, Ben Drummond and Tristan Hyatt-Williams, the company publishes party and family board games including The Chameleon and Herd Mentality. The Sunday Times reported in 2025 that Big Potato Games had developed more than 60 games, including Tilt 'N' Shout and Chicken vs Hotdog, and that its games were sold in 44 countries and translated into 20 languages.

== History ==
Before founding Big Potato Games, Tempest, Drummond and Hyatt-Williams developed the trivia game Linkee. The Evening Standard reported that they later appeared on Dragons' Den and declined an investment offer from Duncan Bannatyne.

Big Potato Games was incorporated on 30 June 2014. ICv2 reported that Big Potato Games entered the United States market in 2016 through a three-year exclusive arrangement with Target. By 2018, the Evening Standard reported that the company had published more than 20 titles. In 2019, WIRED reported that Big Potato Games had begun trialling a four-day working week and that the company had expanded to 20 people, while CNBC reported in 2022 that the company had written the four-day week into employees' contracts in 2020.

== Business and operations ==
Big Potato Games designs and publishes party and family board games. The Sunday Times reported in 2025 that the company had developed more than 60 games, with products sold in 44 countries and translated into 20 languages. The newspaper also reported that two-thirds of the company's revenue came from exports, particularly to the United States. In 2025, BoardGameWire reported that Mobeus Equity Partners acquired a minority stake in Big Potato Games in a £16.2 million deal. The publication reported that the investment was intended to support research and development, digital distribution and international expansion.

== Games ==
The following is a list of games published by Big Potato Games:

- Obama Llama (2015)
- OK Play (2016)
- The Chameleon (2017)
- Blockbuster (2019)
- Herd Mentality (2020)
- Muffin Time: The Random Card Game (2021)
- What Next? (2021)
- Chicken vs. Hotdog (party game)(2022)
- Sounds Fishy (party game) (2022)
- You Can't Say Umm (2023)
- Don't Press That Mine Turtle (2024)
- Tilt 'N' Shout (2024)

== Recognition ==
Several of the company's games have received industry awards or media coverage. The Chameleon won the UK Games Expo award for Best Party Game in 2017, Herd Mentality was included in The Guardian's list of board games to play at Christmas in 2023, and Chicken vs Hotdog won the WITTY Prize at the UK Toy Inventors' Dinner in 2023.
