= RAO Video =

Video rental store in Little Rock, Arkansas

RAO Video was a family run video rental store located in Little Rock, Arkansas. It was one of the oldest and continually operating video rental stores in the world, in business for nearly 45 years before its closure in late 2021.

RAO originally opened in 1977 by Bob Oliver, same year George Atkinson began his pioneering of the video rental industry. Oliver was inspired by an article in The Wall Street Journal, however the public did not originally respond to his business idea. He operated a booth at the Arkansas State Fair for several years to educate the public about video tape.

The original store was located in a 10x10 sqft kiosk in Metrocentre Mall, an outdoor shopping district in downtown Little Rock. It then moved to the Donaghey Building, then to 615 Main St and finally to its present location in 2001 at 609 Main St.

The store featured 30,000 titles on DVD and Blu-ray, including a wide selection of obscure titles, cult classics and adult films as well as adult toys. In later years, the store expanded to include a vape shop and Oak Forest Vintage clothing.

In early 2020, the owner listed the store's downtown Little Rock building for sale for $1.3 million and announced that RAO video would close once a buyer was found. The store remained open and continued selling off its inventory until September 2021, when the building was sold for $850,000.

In 2024, the downtown building that was final twenty-year home of RAO Video was added to the National Register of Historic Places.
