= Videoflicks =

Video rental store in Canada

Coordinates: 43.7277°N 79.4176°W

- Company type: Retail
- Industry: Video rental shop
- Founded: 1981
- Headquarters: Toronto, Ontario, Canada
- Area served: Toronto (formerly in British Columbia and Ottawa)
- Products: Retailing and renting of home video
- Website: myvideoflicks.ca

Videoflicks is a video rental store, and used to be a chain of stores headquartered in Toronto, Ontario, Canada. It was founded in 1981 by Michael and Beverly Kavanagh. The video store claims to be the oldest of its kind in its city. It was a chain of rental stores with several in Ontario and one in Richmond, British Columbia. A secondary location exists in the Kanata neighbourhood of Ottawa, Ontario.
