= Family Video =

American video rental chain

Family Video Movie Club, Inc.

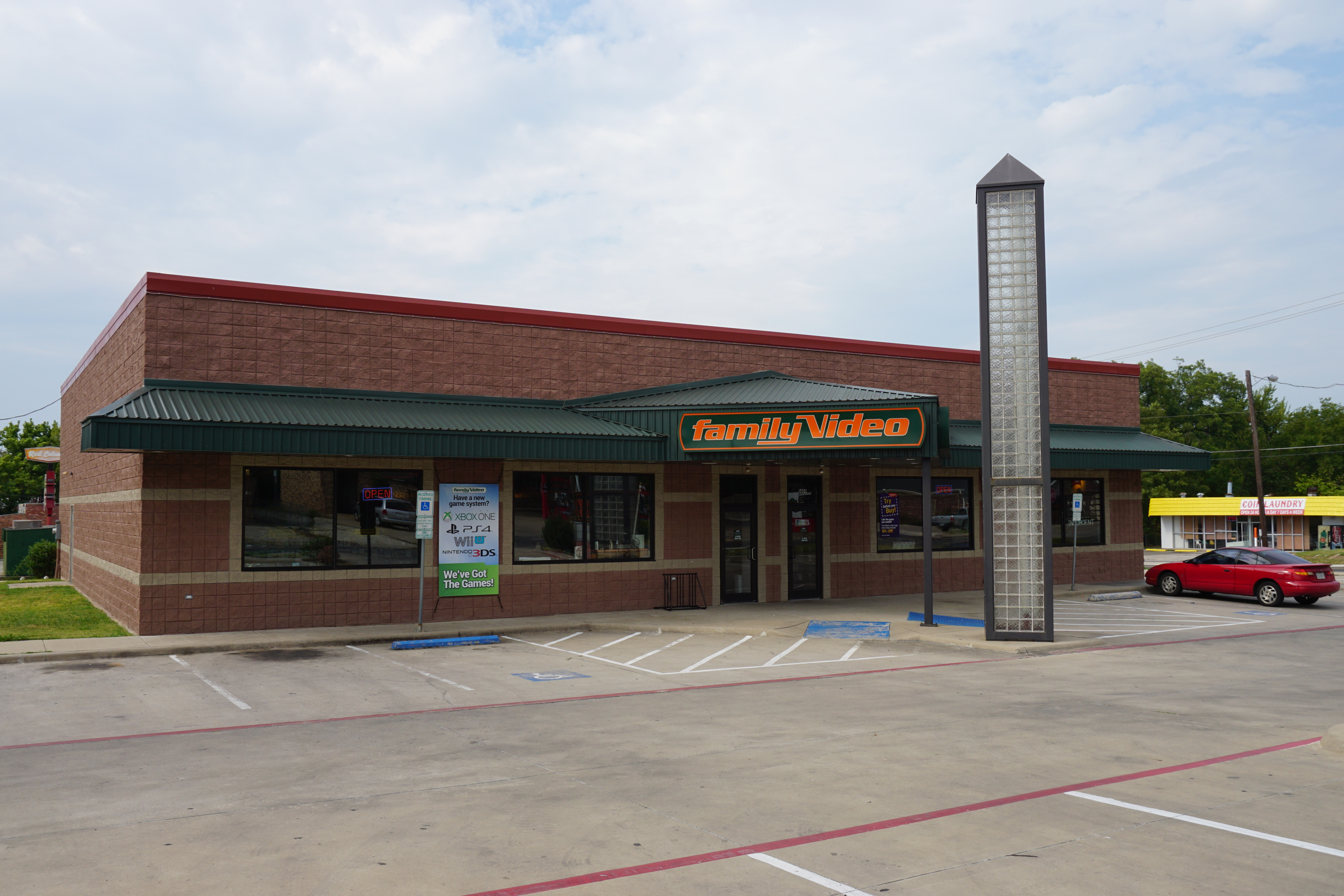
- (Former) Family Video location in Commerce, Texas.
- Type: Private
- Industry: Video rental
- Founded: 1978; 48 years ago
- Defunct: 2021
- Headquarters: Glenview, Illinois, U.S.,
- Number of locations: 750+ (pre-2021); Online Web-store only (2021–2022)
- Area served: United States, Canada
- Key people: Charles Hoogland, CEO; Keith Hoogland, President; Eric Hoogland, Vice-President
- Owner: Highland Ventures
- Number of employees: ~7,000
- Website: familyvideo.com; Archived official website at the Wayback Machine (archive index)

Family Video Movie Club Inc. was an American brick and mortar video rental chain serving the United States and Canada. It was the flagship business of the family-owned company Highland Ventures, which is headquartered in Glenview, Illinois.

== History ==
=== Genesis ===
In 1946, Clarence Hoogland founded Midstates Appliance and Supply Company. His son Charles Hoogland inherited the business in 1953. The company later became a distributor for Magnetic Video. After getting stuck with a large inventory of excess video movies in the late 1970s, Charles got the idea of creating the Video Movie Club in Springfield, Illinois in 1978. The club originally charged a $25 membership fee and $5 rental fee. The chain was later renamed Video Movies Inc. by the 1980s before becoming Family Video.

=== Development ===
Because competitor Blockbuster's main focus was larger cities, Family Video was mostly established in rural areas, suburbs, and small-to-midsize cities. In 2003, Family Video relocated its headquarters from Springfield to Glenview, Illinois. By 2013, Blockbuster had closed almost all of its remaining stores. By the end of 2016, Hastings Entertainment liquidated, making Family Video the sole-surviving video rental chain in the United States.

In addition to its brick and mortar locations, Family Video branched off into other markets such as real estate, 24-hour fitness centers, cell phones, and cable television. The company also sold new and previously used items online. Family Video expanded into the Canadian market in 2012.

In 2013, following the continued decline of competing video rental stores, Family Video formed a partnership with Marco's Pizza, providing space for the franchise in many of its stores. The company used the partnership as a way to deliver video rentals with pizza orders. Family Video also leased space to other retailers such as hair salons and fitness centers. Unlike most competitors, Family Video owned the real estate housing their stores, helping the company avoid unsuccessful lease negotiations that led to the demise of Blockbuster, Movie Gallery, and Hollywood Video. Rather than depending on the revenue-sharing model used by others, the chain bought and owned its movies to keep all the rental profit. It also owned a fiber-optic network in the Central Illinois region, called i3 Broadband, as well as a small chain of fitness centers named StayFit-24.

=== Closure ===
In late 2019, the number of stores was reported to be almost 600, down from a peak of 800. However, due to the COVID-19 pandemic, the chain was forced to close 200 stores in autumn 2020, with about 300 locations remaining.

On January 5, 2021, the company announced all remaining 250 stores would close, and the chain would become an online web-store only. The online store offered new and used video sales along with Family Video branded merchandise such as t-shirts, coffee mugs and tumblers, hats, gym bags, key chains, water bottles, and so on. However, the website was closed at the end of March 2022, ending Family Video's business after 44 years.

=== Trademark acquisition ===
In early 2026, Piko Interactive has filed for the acquisition of the Family Video trademark.
