= Retro Rewind =

2026 video game

- Developer: Blood Pact Studios
- Platform: Windows
- Release: March 17, 2026
- Genres: Simulation, Shopkeeper
- Mode: Single-player

Retro Rewind is a 2026 shopkeeper simulation video game developed and published by Blood Pact Studios on Steam for Windows computers. The game is set in the 1990s and involves operating a simulated video store, a retail business that rents movies and other media content. Gameplay includes ordering, stocking, renting, restocking and rewinding returned VHS tapes, as well as selling various food items such as popcorn and slushies, with new features and mini-games unlocking progressively as the player levels up.

Released for Steam on March 17, 2026, the game quickly surpassed 100,000 copies sold, which was noted as a rare success by several news outlets, with some writing that part of the game's success may be driven by a sense nostalgia for the largely defunct video rental industry.

Retro Rewind uses a cartoon art style, and the virtual store features an aesthetic reminiscent of Blockbuster, and includes 14,000 fictional movies which the player can stock and manage.

== Gameplay ==
Retro Rewind initially places the player outside their store, featuring a generic name and a blue theme similar to Blockbuster, which can be customized by the player, while the location of the checkout counter and various fixtures are not customizeable. The player is instructed to buy shelves using the in-game ordering catalog, and then order random fictional movie titles in packs of ten, which can then be stocked on the shelves. The shelves will automatically rename their title card based on the genres of movies which are stocked – indicated by the color of the VHS box in which the movie is stored.

The interface of the game, showing the player's money and time in the upper right, as seen from behind the store's checkout desk, with a customer waiting to check out.

Time for each in-game day begins at 8:00 am and starts counting after the player opens the store by turning on the "Open" sign, giving time for the player to process returns, rewind tapes and set aside reserved movies for customers to pick up later. The game's clock counts to closing time, which varies with the day of the week, and the in-game "day" can be ended by closing the door when there are no longer any customers browsing. Two minutes elapse in-game for every second of real time, so a full day elapses in six to eight minutes, depending on the closing time. The player can work the cash register, scanning movies and handing out a specific amount of change, with movie rental pricing being tied to the age of the film and the rarity of the copy, some copies being marked as "limited edition" and featuring increased prices. Eventually, the player can hire staff to complete tasks, freeing them up to take on progressively-unlocked game systems.

Occasionally, the back-office phone will ring and customers will ask for the player to reserve copies of movies, as well as to waive late fees. Customers will also stop at the front of the checkout counter to ask for help finding specific genres of movies.

== Development ==
Developer Blood Pact Studios is based in Canada. The studio's second release, Retro Rewind, was developed over 15 months and outperformed the studio's first release, Bonesaw. Studio co-founder Samuel Gauthier said in an interview with The Hollywood Reporter that the development and play-testing of Retro Rewind was more challenging than Bonesaw, due to Retro Rewind being a solo game, which required individual play sessions as opposed to multiplayer. Gauthier also said that he had never been to a Blockbuster, but frequented video stores during his childhood. The developer noted the possibility of including DVDs in future updates, including cleaning and repair.

A patch was added on May 11, 2026, which adds the ability to place a repair desk, allowing the player to restore damaged video tapes. The patch also adds a sandwich board, a folding advertisement sign the player can place outside their store.

A November 2026 update added video game rentals, featuring two fictional consoles: the "Super Tenko" and the "Saga Origin" as well as fictional video game titles which are based on real games, such as Banana King Backwoods (Donkey Kong Country) and First Fantasea 3 (Final Fantasy III).

== Reception ==
Review coverage of Retro Rewind has been positive, noting the game's strong sense of nostalgia and its initial success in sales on Steam. Christopher Livingston from PC Gamer compared the game to Schedule I, partly due to the cartoon art style and character design. Dominik Diamond of The Guardian writes that the game has a lot of tasks to complete, but tries not to overwhelm the player, in contrast (Note: The Guardian referred to Overcooked as "stressfully pacy" in their review of Retro Rewind.) to Overcooked.
