= Record Store Day =

Annual event to celebrate independent record stores

- Logo
- Also called: RSD
- Observed by: Independent Music Stores
- Type: cultural, international
- Celebrations: Live music, limited-edition music releases
- Observances: Shopping at local independent music stores
- Date: Third Saturday of April; Day after US Thanksgiving
- Frequency: Twice a year
- Started by: Eric Levin, Michael Kurtz, Carrie Colliton, Amy Dorfman, Brian Poehner and Don Van Cleave
- Related to: Free Comic Book Day; Video Store Day; Cassette Store Day

Record Store Day is a semi-annual event established in 2008 to "celebrate the culture of the independently owned record store". Held on one Saturday (typically the third) every April and every Black Friday in November, the day brings together fans, artists, and thousands of independent record stores around the world. A number of records are pressed specifically for Record Store Day, with a list of releases for each country, and are only distributed to shops participating in the event.

The event originated in the United States and has expanded internationally, with official organizers in the United Kingdom, Canada, Ireland, Mexico, Europe, Japan, and Australia.

== Background ==
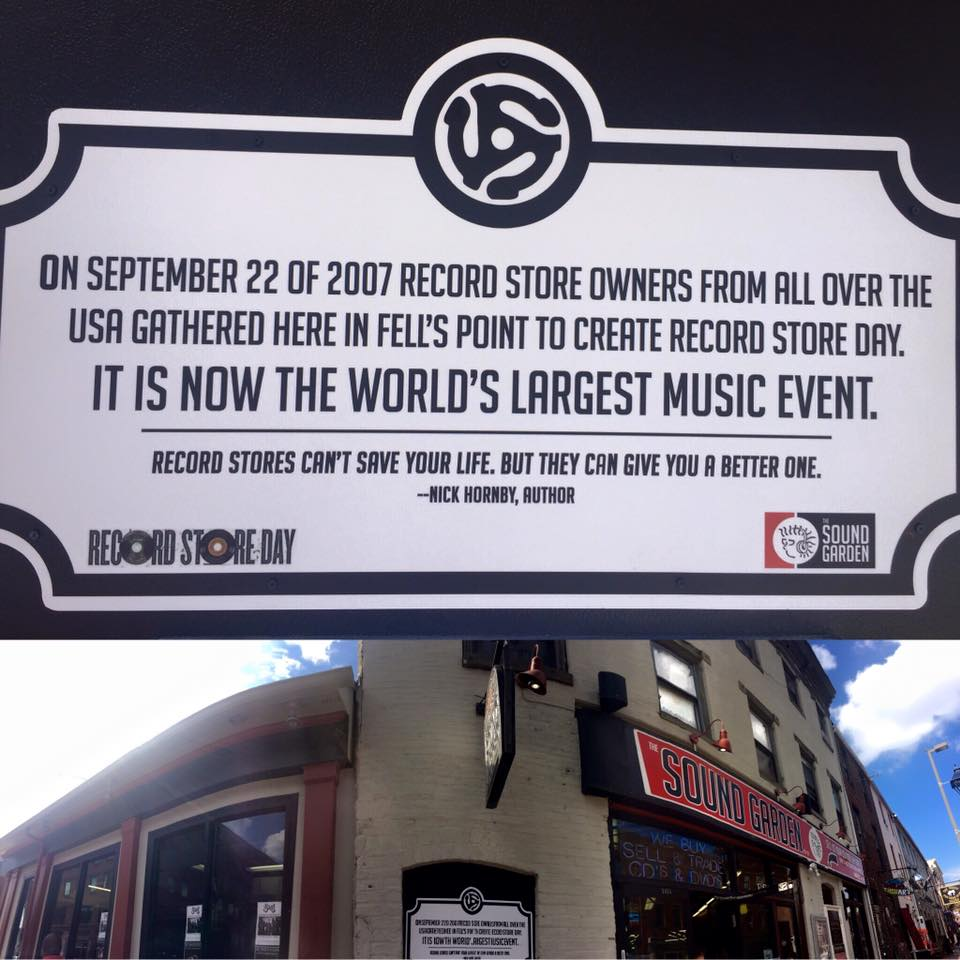
Plaque commemorating the creation of Record Store Day

Originally pitched as an idea to create an event similar to Free Comic Book Day by Bull Moose Music's Chris Brown and Criminal Records' Eric Levin, the concept for Record Store Day was created during a brainstorming session at a meeting of independent record store owners in Baltimore, Maryland. Record Store Day was founded in 2007 by Eric Levin, Michael Kurtz, Carrie Colliton, Amy Dorfman, Brian Poehner and Don Van Cleave, and is now celebrated at stores around the world, with hundreds of recording and other artists participating in the day by making special appearances, performances, meet and greets with their fans, the holding of fundraisers for community non-profits, and the issuing of special vinyl and CD releases along with other promotional offerings to mark the occasion.

Each store holds its own event for the day, to celebrate its place in its community. Although Record Store Day only occurs twice a year, the organization provides promotions, marketing, and other opportunities for stores throughout the year, maintaining a website, social media accounts and other means of promulgating its views about the value of independent record stores. Record Store Day is managed on a day-to-day basis by the Department of Record Stores, along with the Coalition of Independent Music Stores and the Alliance of Independent Media Stores.

== History ==
=== 2000s and 2010s ===
Record Store Day officially began on April 19, 2008, at Rasputin Music in Mountain View, California, with Metallica launching the event. The first celebration featured around 10 special releases from artists like Death Cab for Cutie, R.E.M., and Vampire Weekend. Approximately 300 independent record stores in the U.S. participated, with English singer-songwriter Billy Bragg helping to launch it in the UK. Key British stores, such as Piccadilly Records in Manchester and Rough Trade in London, joined the inaugural festivities, marking the event's first significant expansion beyond the U.S. The second annual Record Store Day took place on April 18, 2009, and was marked by further growth, with 85 special releases and around 500 artist appearances, including Tom Waits, Bob Dylan, and Slayer. Over 1,000 record stores from countries like Japan, Canada, and Germany participated, with New York City's Mayor Mike Bloomberg recognizing it as an official citywide event.

In the 2010 Record Store Day, 1,400 independent record stores participated, and the event saw a 41% increase in sales from the previous year. The Smashing Pumpkins and other artists performed in-store, and Joshua Homme of Queens of the Stone Age served as the ambassador. This year also introduced Black Friday Record Store Day, launched in November 2010. Record Store Day continued to grow in 2011, becoming the world's largest music event. With Ozzy Osbourne serving as ambassador, the event saw over 600 artists participating in in-store performances, including the Beastie Boys, Foo Fighters, and My Chemical Romance. Special releases that year included rare items like a limited-edition 12" vinyl of New Order's "Ceremony", and the event saw a notable 182,000-unit sales bump, as reported by Billboard.

In 2012, Record Store Day celebrated its fifth anniversary with Iggy Pop as the ambassador. The event featured over 400 special releases and saw the launch of the UK's Official Record Store Chart, further highlighting the significance of independent record shops. The event's growth continued in 2013, with Jack White, known for his work with The White Stripes, as the ambassador. The electronic duo Boards of Canada placed six limited records in stores on Record Store Day, in promotion of their 2013 album Tomorrow's Harvest. The event continued to expand in 2014, with Chuck D of Public Enemy serving as ambassador. Notable releases included exclusive tracks from Soundgarden and Joan Jett. In 2015, Dave Grohl became the ambassador, with releases from bands like The White Stripes and Twenty One Pilots coming out.

Metallica, who had helped launch the event, returned as its ambassador in 2016. The event included exclusive releases from artists such as David Bowie, Bob Dylan, and Johnny Cash. The year was also marked by Prince making one of his last public appearances at Electric Fetus in Minneapolis during Record Store Day, purchasing CDs just days before his death. In 2017, the event celebrated its 10th anniversary with St. Vincent as the first female ambassador. The releases in 2017 included a rare classical title, a Soviet-era recording of Shostakovich's Cello Concerto No. 2, and live recordings from artists like Brandy Clark. In 2018, Run The Jewels served as ambassador, and special releases from Prince, Ella Fitzgerald, and Bruce Springsteen came out. In 2019, Record Store Day featured Pearl Jam as the ambassadors, with exclusive vinyl releases such as MTV Unplugged and limited-edition reissues from Gorillaz and John Lennon.

=== 2020s ===
In 2020, Record Store Day faced significant challenges due to the COVID-19 pandemic, which forced the event to be postponed. The event was rescheduled and spread across three dates (August 29, September 26, and October 24), known as "Drops", in addition to the traditional Black Friday event. Record Store Day returned to its in-person format in 2021, although it was spread across two dates: June 12 and July 17. Fred Armisen served as the ambassador for the year, and a 'Black Friday' edition took place in November.

In 2022, the event celebrated its 15th anniversary with Taylor Swift as the first-ever global ambassador. The celebration included special releases and a new "RSD Drops" date in June for delayed items. In 2023, Jason Isbell and Amanda Shires took on ambassador roles, and the event saw Taylor Swift's Folklore: The Long Pond Studio Sessions debuting on vinyl and entering the Billboard 200 Top 10. In 2024, Paramore and Kate Bush served as ambassadors. This year resulted in the highest weekly vinyl sales in 30 years. Record Store Day 2025 took place on April 12, with Post Malone as the U.S. ambassador and Sam Fender representing the UK. Record Store Day 2026 took place on April 18, with Bruno Mars as the U.S. ambassador and Olivia Dean representing the UK.

== Impact and criticism ==
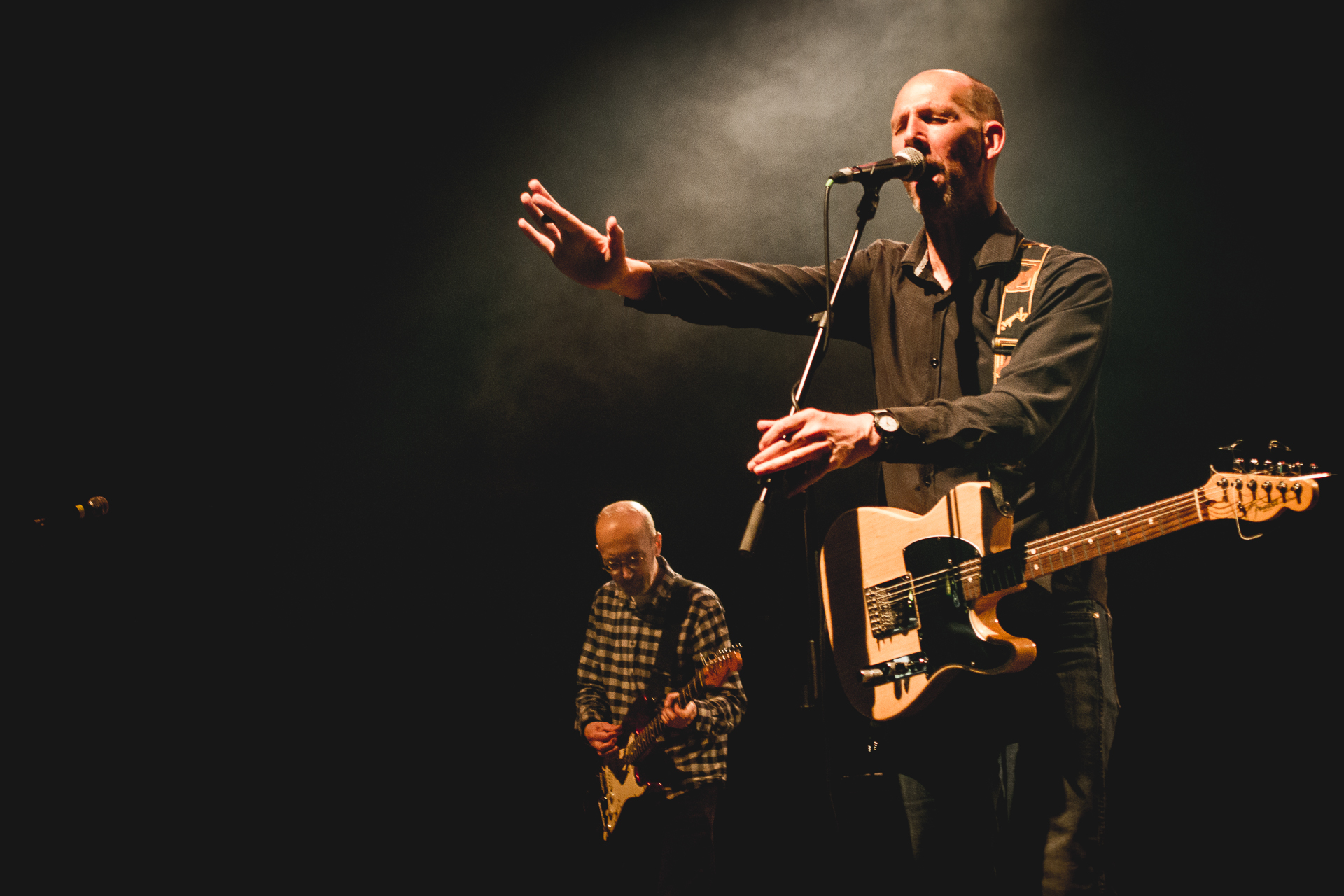
British band Half Man Half Biscuit wrote the song "Record Store Day" mocking the event.

Record Store Day's success inspired the creation of Video Store Day for independent video stores in 2010.

Universal Music's sales manager, Marc Fayd'Herbe, has described Record Store Day as "the single best thing that has ever happened" for independent record shops. The 2013 event was credited with the highest U.S. vinyl sales, and the 2014 edition resulted in independent retailers recording the highest percentage of physical album sales, since the SoundScan system was introduced in 1991. In their 2015 Libera awards, the American Association of Independent Music awarded Record Store Day its "Marketplace Ally" award. Record Store Day 2016 produced the biggest week of sales for the vinyl LP format since the introduction of SoundScan.

In the UK, the event has been criticised for catering to record collectors, rather than casual music fans, and delaying the release of non-affiliated records by monopolising the capacity of record pressing plants. Major labels have been accused of hijacking the event, and the policy of shops being obliged to buy on a no-return basis has been criticised, along with many of the limited releases being re-sold online within hours at inflated prices.

Some shops during the COVID-19 pandemic pushed for a reformat of the event, even suggesting that the initiative risked damaging their businesses due to supply-chain issues.

The British band Half Man Half Biscuit made a song entitled "Record Store Day", released on their album All Asimov and No Fresh Air on 13 June 2025. The song mocks the event, targeting overpriced re-releases of unpopular recordings.

== Ambassadors and honorifics ==
Record Store Day ambassadors
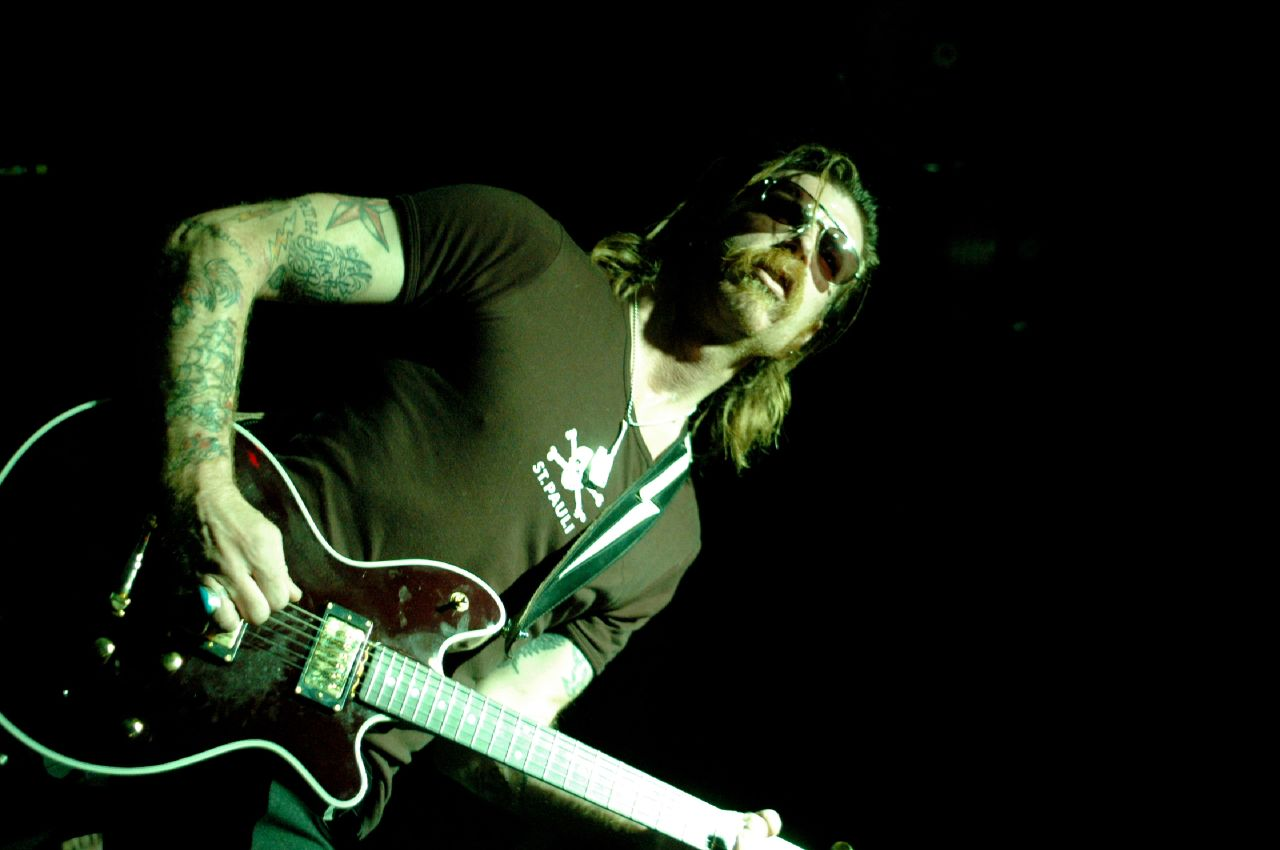
Jesse Hughes was introductory ambassador for Record Store Day.

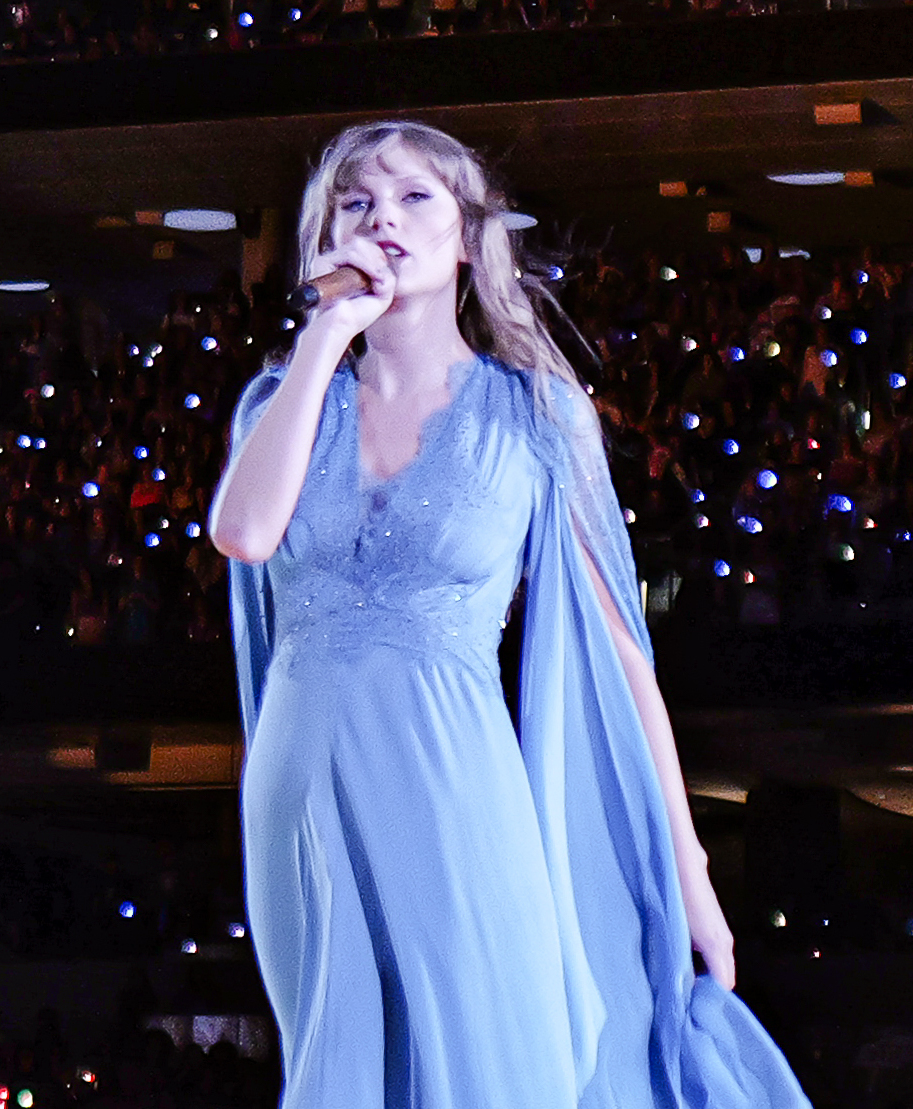
Taylor Swift became the first "global" ambassador in 2022.

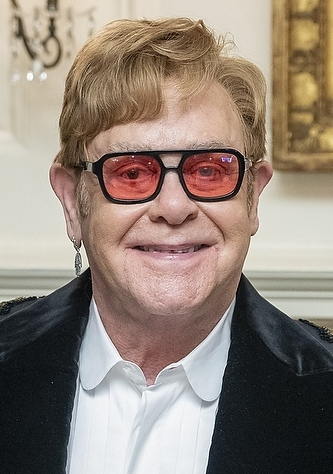
Elton John received the first "Record Store Day Legend" honorific in 2017.

Starting in 2009, Record Store Day has announced influential musicians to carry the honorific title each year.

Year	Ambassador(s)	Region	Release(s)
2009	Jesse Hughes	United States	
2010	Phil Tilli	Netherlands	
2010	Josh Homme	United States	
2011	Tim Knol	Netherlands	
2011	Ozzy Osbourne	United States	"Flying High Again" b/w "I Don't Know (Live)"
2012	Blaudzun	Netherlands	
2012	Iggy Pop	United States	Raw Power LP reissue
2013	Triggerfinger	Belgium, Netherlands, Luxembourg	"Driveby"
2013	Jack White	United States	White Stripes Elephant reissue
2014	Jan Delay	Germany, Austria, Switzerland	7" single
2014	Kensington	Netherlands	
2014	Chuck D	United States	
2015	Typhoon	Netherlands	
2015	Olli Schulz	Germany, Austria, Switzerland	
2015	Dave Grohl	United States	Songs from the Laundry Room 10" vinyl
2016	Adam Brand and Ella Hooper	Australia	
2016	Eefje de Visser	Netherlands	"Staan"
2016	Metallica	United States	Liberté, Egalité, Fraternité, Metallica! CD
2017	Jett Rebel	Netherlands	"Better Off Together" / "Daydreamin'"
2017	Slaves, Kate Tempest, Izzy Bizu	United Kingdom	
2017	St. Vincent	United States	
2018	Elton John	—N/a	17-11-70 LP reissue
2018	The Sheepdogs	Canada	"Nobody" / "I've Got a Hole Where My Heart Should Be"
2018	Claw Boys Claw	Netherlands	"Rosie" / "Dot Dot Dash"
2018	Rag'n'Bone Man	United Kingdom	"Don't Set the World on Fire" / "George Has Got a Friend"
2018	Run the Jewels	United States	Stay Gold Collectors Box (12″ vinyl box set)
2019	Dave Faulkner, Hockey Dad, Kate Ceberano, and Russell Morris	Australia	
2019	Jimmy Dewit	Belgium	
2019	The Trews	Canada	Den of Thieves
2019	Arnaud Rebotini	France	
2019	De Staat	Netherlands	"Kitty Kitty"
2019	The Mighty Boosh	United Kingdom	The Mighty Boosh: The Complete Radio Series
2019	Pearl Jam	United States	Live at Easy Street 12" EP
2020	Ross Wilson	Australia	Summer of '81
2020	Goose	Belgium	"Synrise"
2020	Marie-Mai	Canada	Elle et moi
2020	Étienne Daho	France	Surf
2020	DeWolff	Netherlands	"Made It to 27" / "Nothing's Changing"
2020	The Big Moon	United Kingdom	
2020	Brandi Carlile	United States	"Black Hole Sun / Searching With My Good Eye Closed" 12" single
2021	Hilltop Hoods and Nai Palm	Australia	
2021	Arno	Belgium	7" single
2021	Triumph	Canada	Allied Forces box set
2021	Spinvis	Netherlands	Sunon – Esperanto
2021	Wojtek Mazolewski	Poland	piano forte brutto netto Polka Live
2021	Raphael	Spain	Tour 6.0 EP
2021	Noel Gallagher	United Kingdom	Back the Way We Came: Vol. 1 (2011–2021)
2021	Fred Armisen	United States	"Parade Meeting" 12" single
2022	Whispering Sons	Belgium	"Surface" / "Flood"
2022	Floor Jansen	Netherlands	"Fire"
2022	Taylor Swift	Worldwide	"The Lakes" 7" single
2023	Compact Disk Dummies	Belgium	De Kraak (Original Soundtrack)
2023	Our Lady Peace	Canada	Collected 1994–2022
2023	Froukje	Netherlands	"Als Ik God Was"
2023	Jason Isbell & Amanda Shires	United States	The Sound Emporium 12" EP
2023	The 1975	United Kingdom	Live With The BBC Philharmonic Orchestra
2024	Sylvie Kreusch	Belgium	"Comic Trip" / "Storybook Children"
2024	The Tragically Hip	Canada	"Live at The CBGB's"
2024	Frank Turner	Germany, Austria, Switzerland	"Girl from the Record Shop" / "All Night Crew"
2024	Within Temptation	Netherlands	The Artone Sessions
2024	Elektryczne Gitary	Poland	A ty co Huśtawki
2024	Paramore	United States	Re:This Is Why (Standard album + Remix) and T-shirt/poster combo
2024	Kate Bush	United Kingdom	"Eat the Music" 10" single
2025
2025	Pommelien Thijs	Belgium	Split single with Di-rect
2025	Big Wreck	Canada	Albatross
2025	Die Fantastischen Vier	Germany, Austria, Switzerland	"Long Player" Deluxe version and "Long Player On Tour-Live Stuttgart 2024 (3LP)"
2025	DJ Koco aka Shimokita	Japan	"Made in New York"
2025	Di-rect	Netherlands	Split single with Pommelien Thijs
2025	Dani Nel·lo	Spain	
2025	Sam Fender	United Kingdom	Me and the Dog
2025	Post Malone	United States	Post Malone Tribute to Nirvana "Fortnight" (Taylor Swift featuring Post Malone)
2026	Yong Yello	Belgium	"Zoeke naar wa liefde"
2026	Honeymoon Suite	Canada	The Singles
2026	Ilse DeLange	Netherlands	"Get It Right / Evergreen"
2026	Olivia Dean	United Kingdom	BBC Radio 1 Live Lounge
2026	Bruno Mars	United States	The Collaborations
