= Network Video =

Australian home video rental chain

- Industry: Home entertainment
- Founded: 1993
- Headquarters: Melbourne
- Area served: Australia
- Key people: Keran Wicks
- Services: Home video rentals (VHS, DVD, Blu-ray, Ultra HD Blu-ray, console games)
- Parent: The Network Group
- Website: https://www.thenetworkgroup.com.au/

Network Video was an Australian home video rental chain that offered titles on VHS, DVD, Blu-ray, and Ultra HD Blu-ray, as well as console video games, for rent. At its peak, it operated hundreds of franchise and corporate-owned video rental shops in Australia.

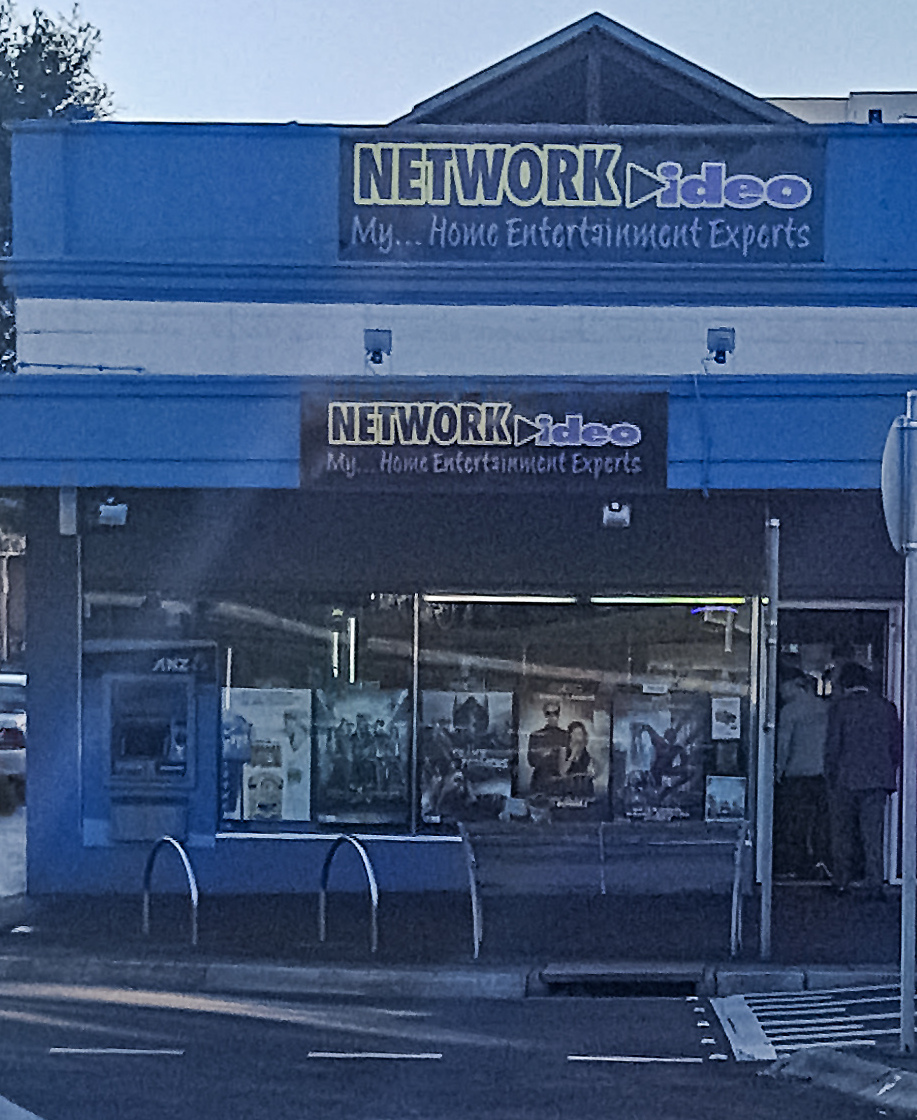
Network Video in Sandringham, closed down in 2019 was one of Victoria's last video rental stores

One of the last Network videos to close was in Sandringham, Victoria in 2019 https://www.heraldsun.com.au/leader/inner-south/bargains-on-offer-at-network-video-sandringham-closing-down-sale/news-story/fcaa749c91609cceb9ce4b0bbe2ba0d4
