= Marco's Pizza =

American pizza restaurant chain

Marco's Franchising LLC

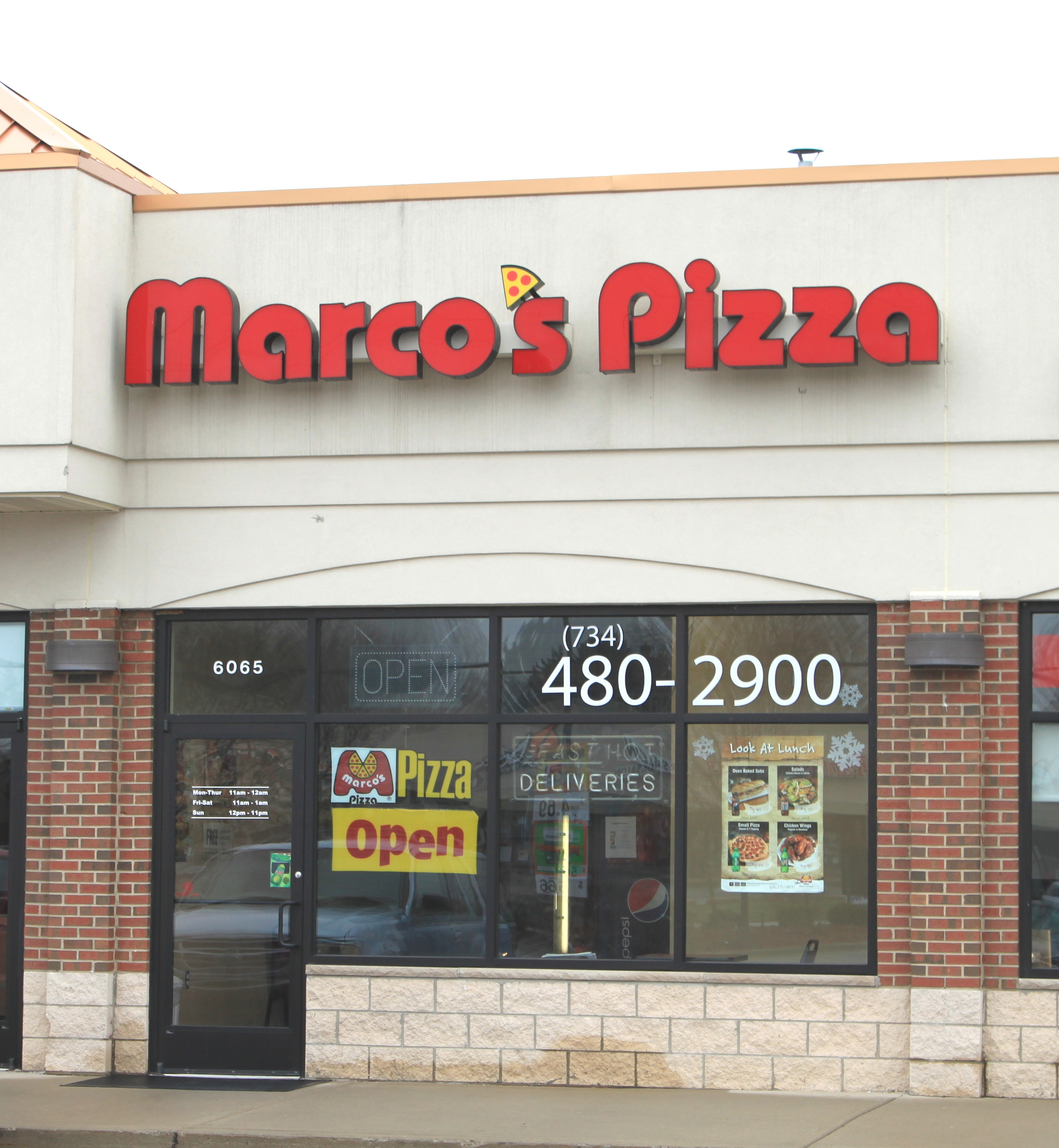
- Marco's Pizza, Van Buren Township, Michigan
- Trade name: Marco's Pizza
- Type: Private
- Industry: Restaurants; Franchising
- Founded: 1978; 48 years ago in Oregon, Ohio, U.S.
- Founder: Pasquale "Pat" Giammarco,
- Headquarters: Toledo, Ohio, U.S.
- Number of locations: ▲1,052
- Area served: United States (including Puerto Rico); Bahamas; India; Mexico
- Key people: Pasquale "Pat" Giammarco, Founder; Jack Butorac, Chairman and CEO; Tony Libardi, President; Bill Schaffler, Chief Financial Officer; Steve Kennedy, Chief Marketing Officer; John Meyers, Chief Operations Officer
- Products: Pizza; Chicken wings; Subs
- Revenue: ▲US$1.5 billion (FY 2025)
- Owner: Jack Butorac
- Number of employees: 20,000 (2021)
- Website: marcos.com

Marco's Pizza, operated by Marco's Franchising, LLC, is an American restaurant chain and interstate franchise based in Toledo, Ohio, that specializes in Italian-American cuisine. The first store was opened in Oregon, Ohio, on Starr Avenue. It was founded by Italian immigrant Pasquale "Pat" Giammarco on February 18, 1978.

As of June 2026, Marco's has opened over 1,300 stores in the United States (including Puerto Rico), as well as in the Bahamas, India and Mexico. In recent years, Marco's has been expanding by approximately 80 new stores each year.

== History ==
=== Founding ===
Born in Sulmona, Italy, Pasquale "Pat" Giammarco is the founder of Marco's Pizza. Giammarco moved to the United States from the Abruzzo region of Italy when he was nine years old and grew up in Dearborn, Michigan, where he worked in his family's pizzeria. He and his father made the sauce recipe that is used in Marco's Pizza locations.

=== Modern history ===
In 2002, restaurant industry expert Jack Butorac was asked to analyze three restaurant concepts as potential growth opportunities, including Marco's Pizza. He traveled through Ohio and stopped at five Marco's Pizza stores in different cities. He found different exteriors and inconsistent branding, but found that the quality of the pizza was the same at each location. Butorac saw the possibilities in the regional brand.

Butorac began working as a consultant with Giammarco and soon began negotiations to purchase the franchising rights to Marco's Pizza. He assumed leadership of the company in January 2004 with the intent to take Marco's Pizza national.

In 2005, nationwide expansion began. Marco's experienced rapid expansion under Butorac's leadership. Since he has owned the company, it has more than doubled in size and expanded to over 35 states, Puerto Rico, the Bahamas, and India. Butorac was presented with the Golden Chain award by Restaurant News in July 2017.

Marco's Pizza and its president, Bryon Stephens, were featured on the January 29, 2016, episode of the CBS television program Undercover Boss.

In the first half of 2025, Marco's Pizza, opened 41 new stores.

=== Family Video partnership ===
In 2013, Family Video formed a partnership with Marco's Pizza, providing space for the franchise in many of its stores. The company used the partnership as a way to deliver video rentals with pizza orders. The partnership ended following Family Video shutting down all of their stores in 2021.

== Menu ==
The Marco's Pizza menu is available for delivery or take-out, while some locations offer dine-in and catering options. The menu includes pizza, subs, wings, salads, CheezyBread, CinnaSquares, pizza bowls, and co-branded Ghirardelli brownies.

Some of the specialty pizzas found on the menu are White Cheezy, Chicken Florentine, Pepperoni Magnifico, Chicken Fresco, Spicy Fresco, and Double Pepperoni Spicy Fresco pizzas. The signature ingredient of the Fresco pizzas is Marco's giardiniera, an Italian pepper relish.

== Reception ==
In 2014, Marco's Pizza was named the #3 best pizza chain by Consumer Reports magazine on its list of Best and Worst Fast Food Restaurants in America based on survey results. It was the first time Marco's Pizza had ever appeared on this list.

In 2016, Marco's Pizza was ranked at #10 on the Pizza Today list of the Top 100 Pizza Companies in the United States. The company was also named one of Marketing Quarterly's Top 25 Pizza Chains and named by Franchising World as number eight on the magazine's list of "Fast and Serious Growth Franchises".

Marco's Pizza was listed at #8 in Pizza Today's Top 100 Pizza Chains for 2017 and was named by Franchise Times as number eight on the magazine's list of Fast and Serious growth franchises. In 2012, Marco's Pizza partnered with privately held movie rental chain Family Video to open Marco's locations sharing a building with as many as 350 Family Video stores.

== See also ==
- List of pizza chains of the United States
