= Video Store Day =

Annual event to celebrate independent video stores

- Also called: VSD
- Observed by: Independent video stores
- Type: Cultural, international
- Celebrations: Limited-edition movie releases
- Date: Third Saturday of October
- Frequency: Annual
- Started by: Daniel Hanna
- Related to: Record Store Day; Free Comic Book Day

Video Store Day (VSD), also called International Independent Video Store Day, is an annual event created in 2010 as an "attempt to consolidate the power of the thousands of independently owned video stores still in operation across the continent and worldwide". It is celebrated on the third Saturday of October each year to promote the idea of supporting local, independent video stores. It was inspired by and is similar to Record Store Day for independent record stores.

Each year, VSD features a variety of exclusive, limited-edition movie releases on formats such as 4K, Blu-ray, DVD, and VHS. These titles are only available through VSD-participating stores and are typically announced in August. Participating video stores are located in Canada, the United States, and Europe, specifically Finland and Germany.

== Background ==
Video Store Day began as a grassroots event. VSD was created by Daniel Hanna, owner and proprietor of Eyesore Cinema in Toronto, Canada, in 2010. Following the arrival of Netflix in Canada in 2010, store manager Mark Hanson began noticing customers returning to the physical location by 2013. VSD was inspired by the success of Record Store Day, along with the idea of "Netflix fatigue" and the belief that certain customers like being able to browse titles, hold them in their hands, and chat with video store staff members.

Other key people involved with VSD include Nick Sewell, a former video store employee, rock star, and graphic designer, who creates VSD's yearly logos, along with Paul Traynor, manager of the "Independent DVD Rental Shop Owners Worldwide" group.

In July 2026, it was announced that MVD Entertainment Group had partnered with Video Store Day for its 16th annual event. The partnership would result in 12 exclusive titles, including special-edition VHSs of Cannibal Holocaust (1980) and The Toxic Avenger (1984).

== Cultural impact ==
Video Store Day has become part of a larger movement in which consumers, especially younger ones (like Gen-Z), are returning to physical media as part of "subscription fatigue" or "subscription burnout", nostalgia for older forms of entertainment, and to avoid the disappearance of content purchased digitally.

In February 2025, Consumer Reports (CR) released results from a May 2024 survey of 2,022 U.S. adults regarding their use of various types of physical media. CR found that nearly 50% of those surveyed were still watching DVDs and Blu-rays, while 15% were still using VHS tapes.

== See also ==
- DVD-by-mail
- List of home video companies
- Record Store Day
- Free Comic Book Day

== External link ==
- Official website
