= Geo Corporation =

Japanese video and media rental stores

Geo Corporation 株式会社ゲオ
- Type: Public
- Traded as: TYO: 2681
- Founded: 10 January 1989
- Headquarters: Kasugai, Aichi, Japan
- Products: Renting of DVDs, CDs, and Blu-ray Discs
- Revenue: 197,274,000,000 yen (2023)
- Number of employees: 3,178 (2010)
- Parent: Geo Group (Japan)
- Website: http://www.geonet.co.jp/

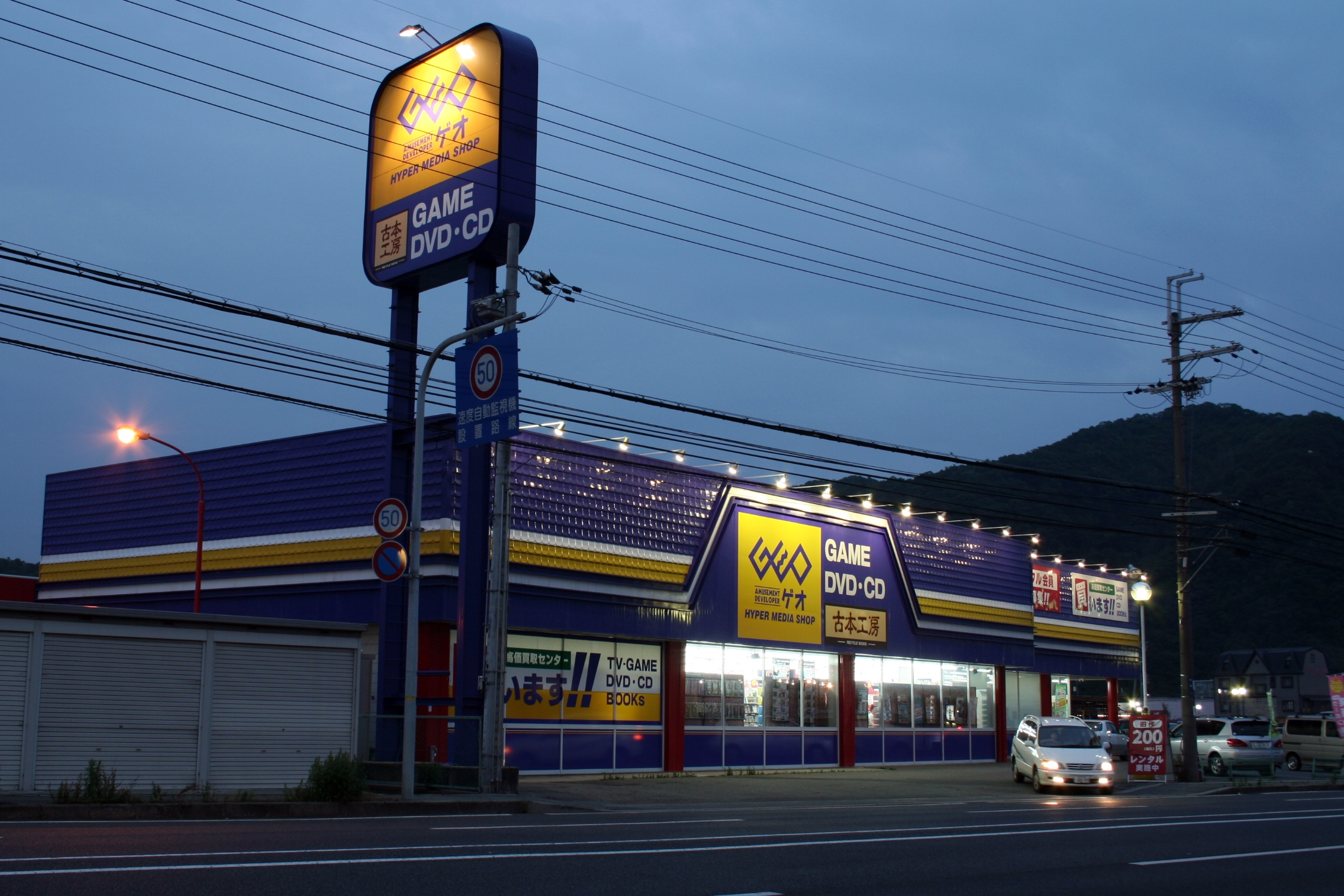
Geo Himeji Tohori at dusk

Geo Corporation (株式会社ゲオ, Kabushiki-gaisha Geo) is a Japanese company that mainly operates in the buying and selling of products, notably but not limited to DVDs, CDs, and video games. The name of the company originates from the Latin word "Geo" meaning "Earth" as the company would like to entertain everyone on planet Earth.

As of 30 September 2023, the company had 1,086 video rental stores.

== See also ==
- Culture Convenience Club
- Book Off
- HMV
