= Magnetic Video =

Home entertainment company (1968–1982)

Magnetic Video Corporation
- Type: Home video company
- Industry: Home video
- Founded: January 1, 1968; 58 years ago
- Founder: Andre Blay; Leon Nicholson
- Defunct: January 1982; 44 years ago
- Fate: Acquired by 20th Century-Fox; rebranded as 20th Century-Fox Video
- Successor: Blay Video; 20th Century-Fox Video; Walt Disney Studios Home Entertainment; Sony Pictures Home Entertainment; Studio Distribution Services
- Headquarters: Farmington Hills, Michigan
- Area served: Worldwide
- Products: Pre-recorded videocassettes
- Owner: Independent (1968–1979); 20th Century-Fox (1979–1982)

Magnetic Video Corporation was a home video/home audio duplication service that operated between 1968 and 1982.

== History ==
Magnetic Video Corporation was established by the co-founder Andre Blay, an American film producer in 1968 with Leon Nicholson and was based in Farmington Hills, Michigan. In 1977, it became the first corporation to release theatrical motion pictures onto Betamax and VHS videocassette for consumer use. (Cartridge Television, Inc. preceded it in 1972 when it introduced the Avco Cartrivision home VCR with a line of major motion pictures available for rent on the Cartrivision videocassette format. Cartrivision went off the market thirteen months after its debut.)

Magnetic Video is notable for its contribution to the birth of the modern-day home video industry and the birth of video rental systems. In the fall of 1976, Blay came up with the idea to release pre-recorded motion pictures on videocassette. The following year, he convinced 20th Century-Fox, which was then in financial difficulty, to license fifty of their films for home video release in VHS and Betamax formats. Blay also established the Video Club of America in order to sell the titles directly to consumers by mail. Their first ad appeared in the November 26 to December 2 Issue of TV Guide (Soap Cast on Cover).

That same year, George Atkinson bought one Betamax and one VHS copy of each of the first 50 movie titles from Magnetic Video that were then being sold to the public and established the Video Station rental company from a storefront in Los Angeles. He charged $50 for an "annual membership" and $100 for a "lifetime membership," which provided the opportunity to rent the videos for $10 a day.

These 50 titles were:

- Hello, Dolly! (1969)
- Fantastic Voyage (1966)
- Von Ryan's Express (1965)
- The King And I (1956)
- Patton (1970)
- The Hustler (1961)
- The Agony and the Ecstasy (1965)
- Cleopatra (1963)
- The French Connection (1971)
- Hombre (1967)
- The Only Game in Town (1970)
- Can-Can (1960)
- The Day the Earth Stood Still (1951)
- The Graduate (1967)
- The Desert Fox (1951)
- Beneath the Planet of the Apes (1970)
- The Bible (1966)
- The Boston Strangler (1968)
- Tora! Tora! Tora! (1970)
- The Detective (1968)
- Gentlemen Prefer Blondes (1953)
- The Longest Day (1962)
- The Grapes of Wrath (1940)
- The Robe (1953)
- How to Marry a Millionaire (1953)
- Dr. Dolittle (1967)
- The Panic in Needle Park (1971)
- The Marriage of a Young Stockbroker (1971)
- Vanishing Point (1971)
- The Sand Pebbles (1966)
- State Fair (1962)
- Bus Stop (1956)
- Three Coins in the Fountain (1954)
- From the Terrace (1960)
- Those Magnificent Men in Their Flying Machines (1965)
- The Song of Bernadette (1943)
- How to Steal a Million (1966)
- How Green Was My Valley (1941)
- M*A*S*H (1970)
- Love is a Many-Splendored Thing (1955)
- Anastasia (1956)
- Boy on a Dolphin (1957)
- The Hot Rock (1972)
- The Seven Year Itch (1955)
- Valley of the Dolls (1967)
- Voyage to the Bottom of the Sea (1961)
- The Long, Hot Summer (1958)
- The Paper Chase (1973)
- Carmen Jones (1954)
- The Razor's Edge (1946)
- A Farewell to Arms (1957)

This and similar video stores were a success, and Magnetic Video took off, adding titles from the following companies in the next four years, in addition to continuing to release original titles from Fox:

- 1978: Viacom, RBC Films/The Charlie Chaplin estate, and AVCO Embassy Pictures
- 1979: Brut Productions, Bill Burrud Productions, and Pathé newsreels
- 1980: ABC Video Enterprises, ITC (Magnetic's first release from ITC was The Muppet Movie), and American Film Theatre
- 1981: United Artists (UA; including pre-1950 Warner Bros. films which were owned by UA at that time), in addition to establishing short-lived sports and laserdisc divisions.

The Magnetic Video project was such a success that it soon came over to the United Kingdom as "Magnetic Video UK" in 1978. Not long after, Magnetic Video branched into Australia, trading under "Magnetic Video Australia".

In March 1979, Fox purchased Magnetic Video, which was a small OTC traded public company (Blay was a major shareholder and Chairman). In January 1982, shortly after Blay's departure from the company, Fox reorganized Magnetic Video into 20th Century-Fox Video. Around the same time, Magnetic Video began to issue films in laserdisc format. Later that same year, Fox merged its video operations with CBS Video Enterprises, resulting in the creation of CBS/Fox Video on June 18, 1982.

Magnetic Video Corporation famously opened its video releases with an animation of their logo and the words "MAGNETIC VIDEO CORPORATION" repeatedly scrolling upwards and mirrored in the background, and an announcement would come over the mellow guitar and horn music playing (announcements and music might differ depending on the company):

- "By special arrangement with (movie studio name), Magnetic Video Corporation is proud to offer the following (major/classic) motion picture on videocassette."
- "Magnetic Video, in cooperation with (movie studio name), is proud to offer the following feature on videocassette." (Alternate)
