= George Atkinson (businessman) =

American businessman

- Born: June 2, 1935
- Died: March 3, 2005 (aged 69); Northridge, Los Angeles, California, US
- Known for: Founder of The Video Station

George Atkinson (June 2, 1935 – March 3, 2005), was an American businessman, credited as the father of the storefront video rental store in the U.S. Atkinson established the first major chain of video specialty retailers, The Video Station.

== Biography ==
When the first videocassettes became available to the public, he was already in the movie business. Customers in the form of hotels and pizza parlors would rent movie projectors and public domain 8mm movies, and later U-Matic videotape. When VCRs first went on sale in 1975, studios thought they would be a luxury item and that customers would want to buy films to own. Atkinson, however, was the first to see the possibility of a video rental market.

However, the company he was working for, Home Theater Systems, was not doing well, and himself had gone through a difficult divorce that cost him his house and a struggle with alcoholism.

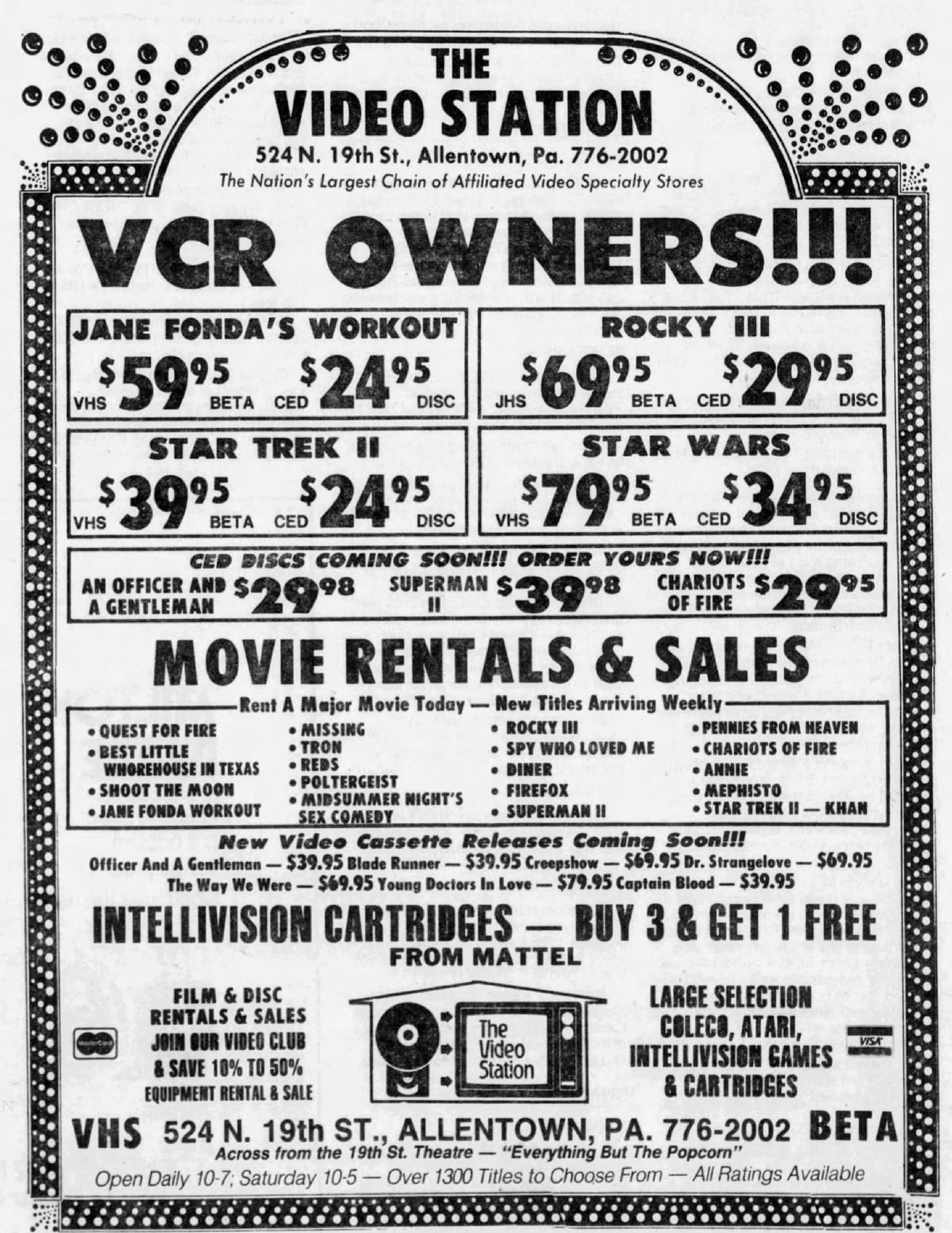
1983 The Video Station ad in The Morning Call, Allentown, Pennsylvania

In December 1977, George Atkinson spent approximately $3000 to buy one Betamax and one VHS copy of each of the 50 available movie titles from Magnetic Video, which were then being sold to the public by direct mail. He announced the availability of the videos for rent in the sports section of a local newspaper, after already advertising "Video for Rent" at an earlier date before he had any videos, along with a coupon for readers to fill out and mail in. Atkinson turned his shop into the first professionally managed video rental store and renamed it Video Station, a 600 square foot (56 m^{2}) storefront on Wilshire Boulevard in Los Angeles. In order to raise capital, Atkinson charged $50 for an "annual membership" and $100 for a "lifetime membership," which provided the opportunity to rent the videos for $10 a day.

Atkinson was soon threatened with a lawsuit for renting the videos, but he discovered that U.S. copyright law gave him the right to rent and re-sell videos he owned. The battle to protect the public's right to rent videos was a major catalyst for the establishment of the Video Software Dealers Association in 1981. His company went public in 1983 but Atkinson resigned and sold his stake a few years later. At its peak, the chain had over 600 affiliates throughout the U.S. and Canada.

He died March 3rd, 2005 at his home in Northridge of complications from emphysema.

== Awards ==
- 1981 - First ever "Video Man of the Year"
- 1982 - "Video Retailer of the Year"
- 1991 - Inducted into the Video Hall of Fame
