= VHS tape rewinder =

Electronic device

A VHS tape rewinder is an electronic device used to rewind VHS tapes.

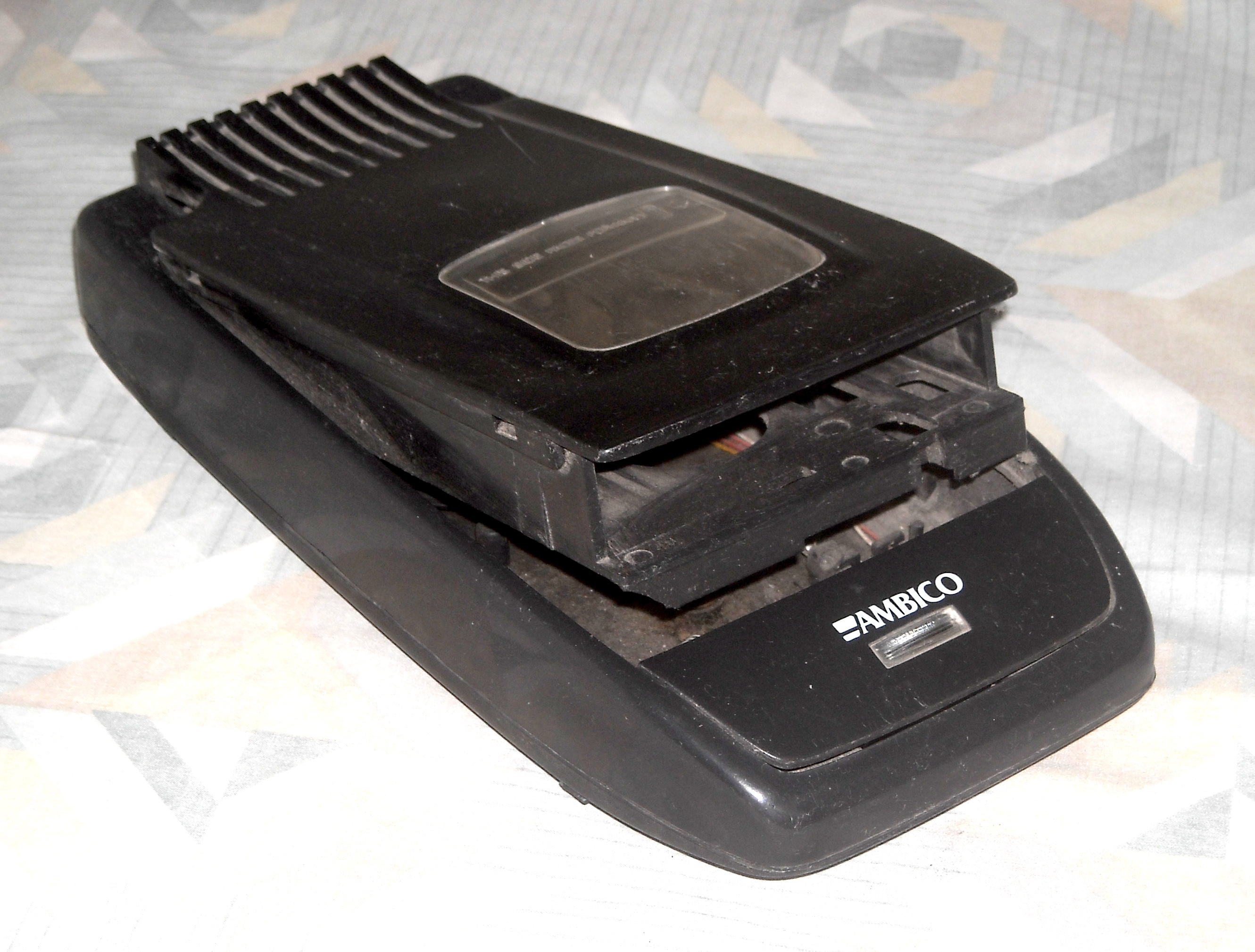
A rewinder for VHS tapes

== History ==
Much like Beta tape rewinders, VHS tape rewinder devices were created shortly after the production of videotapes and were used for several reasons. One was because VCRs were believed to make kinks in the tapes which could corrupt playback after several rewinds. Another was to free up the VCR for viewing other tapes while the tape was being rewound. Video rental stores like Blockbuster charged a fee for not rewinding returned VHS tapes, and had slogans such as "Be kind, please rewind". A rewinder could rewind tapes smoothly and be several times faster. Using a rewinder would also prevent wear and tear on the VCR heads.

In 1993 a video magazine editor surveyed electronics repair experts, asking them, "What is the worst thing you can do to your VCR?" The most common answer was regularly rewinding rented videotapes. Experts advised the use of tape rewinders to save VCR heads from "junk" on rental cassettes.
