= Andre Blay =

American film producer

- Born: July 27, 1937; Mount Clemens, Michigan, U.S.
- Died: August 24, 2018 (aged 81); Bonita Springs, Florida, U.S.
- Occupations: Businessman; Film producer Studio executive
- Years active: 1966–2018

Andre Blay (July 27, 1937 – August 24, 2018) was an American businessman, film producer, and studio executive.

== Early life and education ==
Blay was born July 27, 1937, in Mount Clemens, Michigan, to homemaker Agnes and factory manager Robert. He graduated in 1959 from Michigan State University with a bachelor's degree and a master's in business education.

== Role in growth of home video industry ==
Blay co-founded Stereodyne, the nation's first eight-track and cassette duplication company, in 1966. It duplicated cartridges for groups such as The Supremes.

In 1969, Blay founded an audio/video production and duplication company called Magnetic Video, which produced a series of industrial films and tapes for various corporations in the early 1970s. In 1976, shortly after Sony introduced its Betamax videocassette recorder, Blay flew to Hollywood, where he asked various studio executives if they could allow him to make videocassettes of the films they released. Only one company responded with an offer: 20th Century-Fox, which licensed 50 of its pre-1972 feature films to Magnetic. The deal proved successful, and led to Blay making similar duplication and distribution deals for films owned by Viacom, the estate of silent screen comedian Charlie Chaplin, wildlife filmmaker Bill Burrud, ABC Pictures, and ITC Entertainment. In 1980, he wooed United Artists out of a preexisting deal with VidAmerica with a $43 million deal that covered its own films and American distribution of the pre-1950 Warner Bros. library.

While at work growing his Magnetic Video empire, Blay also started the Video Club of America, a direct-mail sales operation through which he offered the video cassettes produced and duplicated at Magnetic Video. He used TV Guide to advertise the club, which also carried titles from Columbia Pictures and Walt Disney Productions after they each launched video divisions of their own, and the results initially allowed it to boast registration of over 9,000 users.

That subsequently provided the model for and enabled the creation of the first video rental stores, many of which were soon started thereafter.

He was later recognized by the Consumer Electronics Association as creating the idea that "sparked a retail revolution as hundreds of mom-and-pop video rental and sales stores popped up in every community in America." In 1987, home video rental income surpassed movie theater revenues for the first time. Today, movie studios routinely make more money on video rentals and sales than from the box office of theaters.

== CEO of 20th Century-Fox Video ==
In the late 1970s, Blay paid a flat fee of $300,000 plus $500,000 yearly to 20th Century-Fox to license movies from their catalogue, which he then duplicated and distributed, earning a royalty generated per video rented. This proved so successful that 20th Century Fox quickly bought Magnetic Video in 1979 to form the 20th Century-Fox Video unit, for $7.2 million. Blay then served as the first CEO of 20th Century-Fox Video.

== Blay Video ==
Blay left Fox in 1981 and subsequently formed Andre Blay Corporation, a video software firm. Through this newly formed company, Blay acquired the home video rights to 90 feature films.

== CEO of Embassy Home Entertainment ==
In 1982, Blay sold his corporation to Embassy Pictures, and became CEO of their newly formed Embassy Home Entertainment. While there he helped bring to production several movies, including Hope and Glory, Sid and Nancy, Souvenir, and A Time of Destiny. He served as CEO until 1986, when the company was sold.

== Executive Movie Producer ==
During the next several years Blay served as executive producer for several movies:

- Mosquito (1995)
- Village of the Damned (1995)
- Souvenir (1989)
- They Live (1988)
- The Blob (1988)
- Jack's Back (1988 producer, uncredited)
- Brain Damage (1988)
- Prince of Darkness (1987)
- Homeboy (1988)

He also worked in securing venture capital for films such as The Princess Bride, The Emerald Forest, and The Name of the Rose. He was also involved in the purchase of Cinema Group in 1987 with Elliott Kastner.

== CEO of Enterprise Software ==
Blay subsequently served, until 1999, as chairman and CEO of Enterprise Software, a developer of broadcast management software for television stations and distributors, cable networks, and radio stations worldwide.

== Death ==
Blay died from complications of pneumonia on August 24, 2018, at the age of 81.

== Awards ==
- In 2000, Blay was inducted into the Consumer Electronics Hall of Fame.
- Blay was made an Honorary Alumnus at Central Michigan University's College of Business Administration in 2006.
