= Video rental shop =

Physical retail business that rents home videos

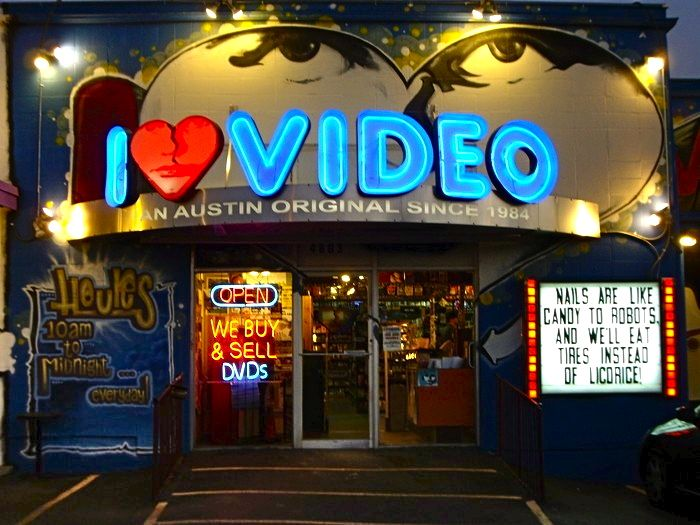
The exterior of a video rental store in Austin, Texas (closed in 2020)

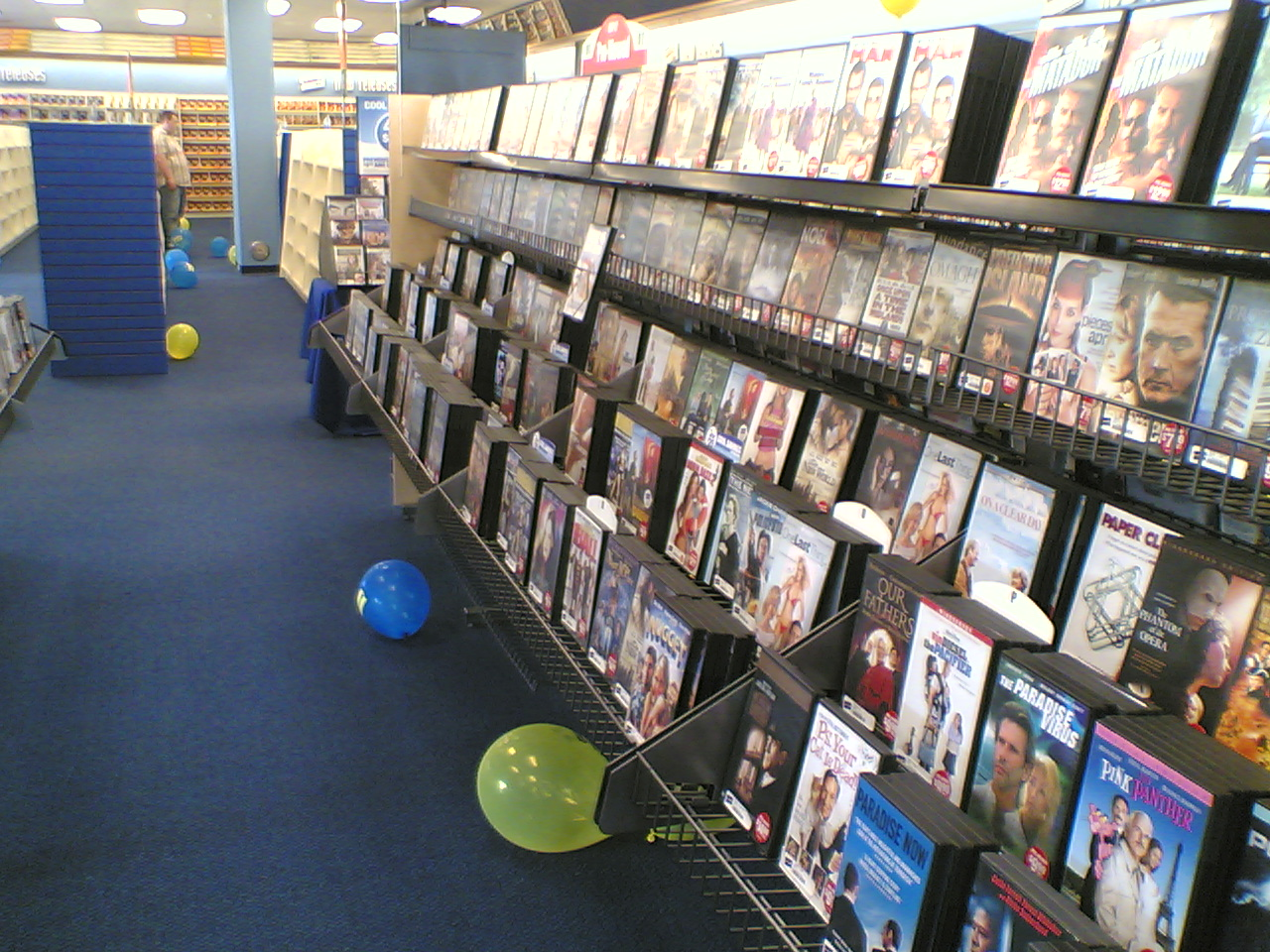
A display case of DVDs in a former Blockbuster video rental outlet in Iowa, 2006

A video rental shop/store is a physical retail business that rents home videos such as movies, prerecorded TV shows, video game cartridges/discs and other media content. Typically, a rental shop conducts business with customers under conditions and terms agreed upon in a rental agreement or contract, which may be implied, explicit, or written. Many video rental stores also sell previously viewed movies and/or new, unopened movies.

In the 1980s, video rental stores rented VHS and Betamax tapes of movies; however, most stores dropped Betamax tapes when VHS won the format war late in the decade. In the 2000s, video rental stores began renting DVDs, a digital format with higher resolution than VHS. In the late 2000s, stores began selling and renting Blu-ray discs, a format that supports high definition resolution.

Video rental stores have experienced a significant decline in the 21st century. Increasing accessibility of electronic medias in library circulation and widespread adoption of video on demand and video streaming services such as Netflix and Disney+ in the 2010s sharply reduced the revenues of most major rental chains, leading to the closure of most locations. Due to the precipitous drop in demand, few rental shops have survived into the present day. As of 2022, the small number of remaining stores tend to cater to film buffs seeking classic and historic films, art films, independent films, foreign language films, and cult films that are less available on streaming platforms.

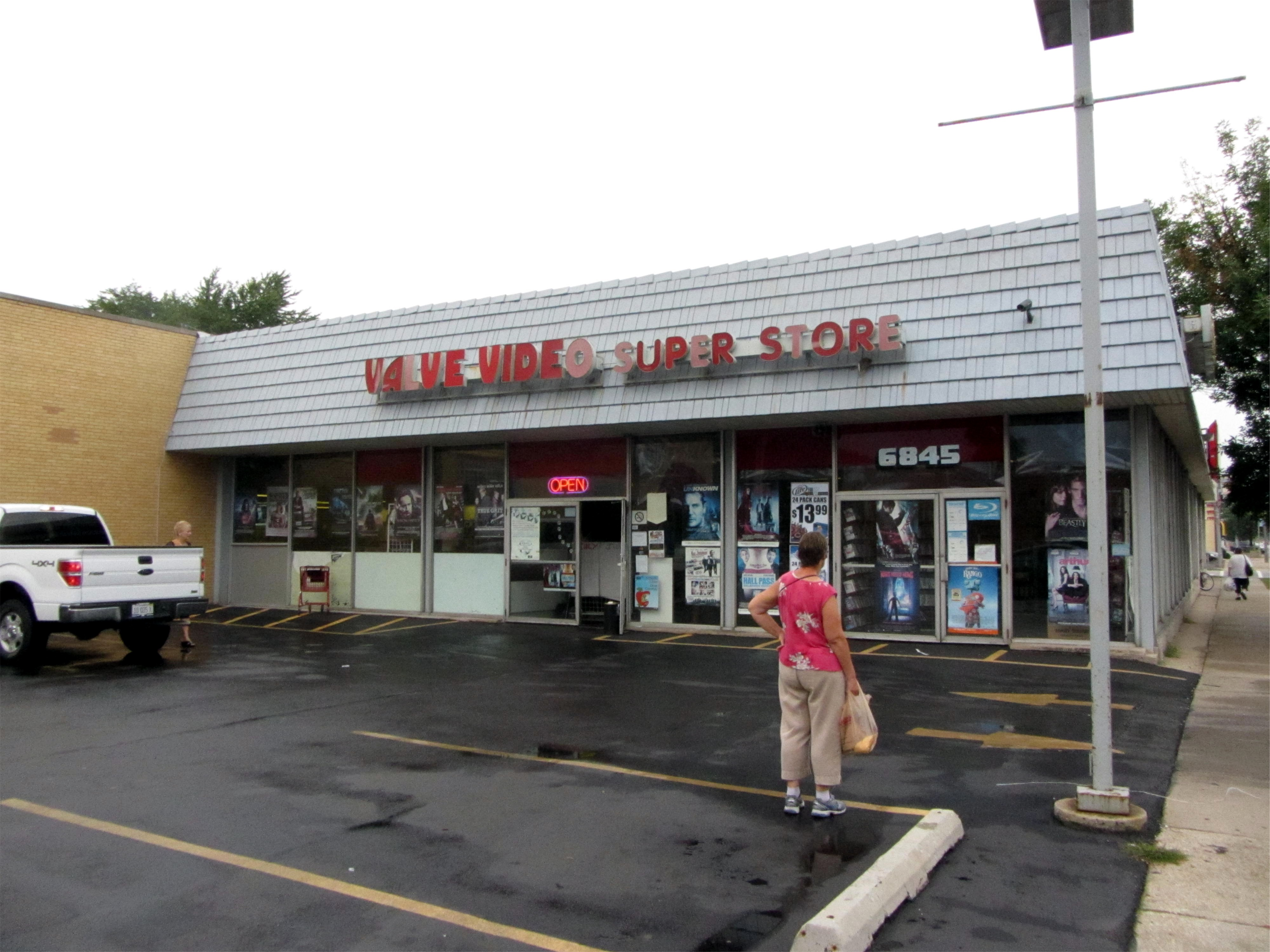
A video rental store in Berwyn, Illinois, US, closed in 2015

== History ==
=== 1970s ===
The world's oldest business renting out copies of movies for private use was a film reel rental shop opened by Eckhard Baum in Kassel, Germany, in the summer of 1975. Baum collected movies on Super 8 film as a hobby and lent pieces of his collection to friends and acquaintances. Because they showed great interest in his films, he came up with the idea of renting out films as a sideline. Over the years, videotapes and optical discs were added to the range. As of April 2023, Baum still operates the business; the business was portrayed in the June 2006 documentary film Eckis Welt by Olaf Saumer.

The first professionally managed video rental store in the U.S., Video Station, was opened by George Atkinson in December 1977 at 12011 Wilshire Boulevard in Los Angeles. After 20th Century Fox had signed an agreement with Magnetic Video founder Andre Blay to license him 50 of their titles for sale directly to consumers, amongst them Butch Cassidy and the Sundance Kid, M*A*S*H, Hello, Dolly!, Patton, The French Connection, The King and I and The Sound of Music, Atkinson bought all the titles in both VHS and Beta formats, and offered them for rent. Such stores led to the creation of video rental chains such as West Coast Video, Blockbuster Video, and Rogers Video in the 1980s.

Sony released its first commercially available video recorders in the United States on June 7, 1975; the following year, on October 25, 1976, Universal and Disney filed a lawsuit against Sony in the case known as Sony Corp. of America v. Universal City Studios, Inc. The two studios tried to ban the sales of VCRs, and later the rental of movies, which would have destroyed the video rental business in the US. Justice Harry Blackmun sided with the studios, while Justice John Paul Stevens ruled in Sony's favor. Eventually, on January 17, 1984, the Supreme Court overruled the U.S. 9th Circuit Court of Appeals after Justice Sandra Day O'Connor changed her mind, leading to a 5-to-4 ruling.

=== 1980s ===
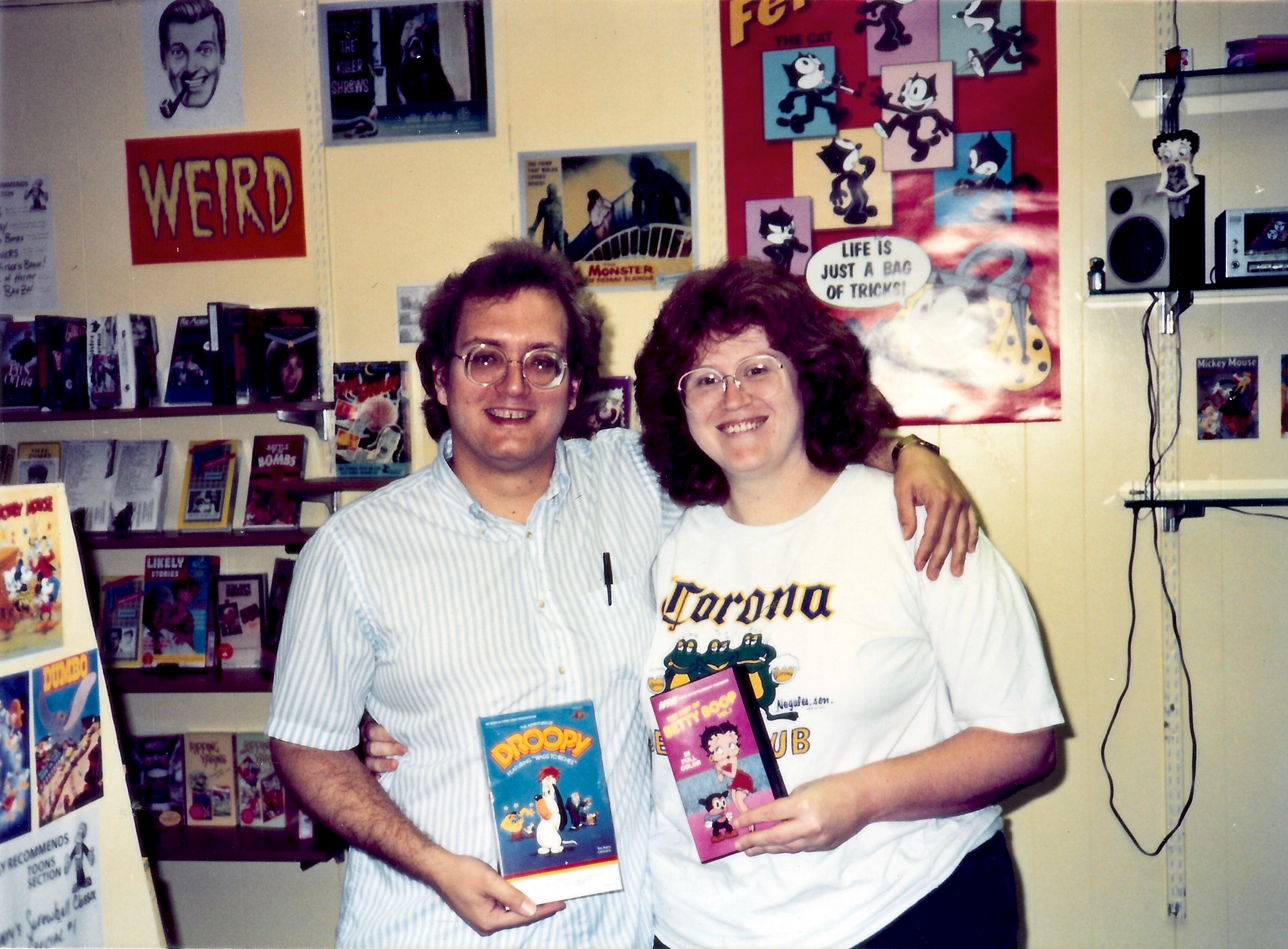
Two New Orleans residents pick out films in 1988.

Video games started being rented in video shops from 1982. Some of the earliest game cartridges available for rental included Donkey Kong, Frogger and E.T. the Extra-Terrestrial. However, not many stores made them available for rental at the time. In Japan, in response to rental stores making pirated copies of games, video game companies, as well as the Recording Industry Association of Japan and trade associations, lobbied for an amendment to the Japanese Copyright Act that banned the rental of video games in Japan in 1984. Some video game companies intentionally made their games more difficult to prevent them from being beaten during the rental period, in the hopes players would purchase games instead of renting.

By mid-1985, the United States had 15,000 video rental stores; further, many record, grocery, and drug stores also rented videotapes. By May 1988, the number of specialty video stores was estimated to be 25,000, in addition to 45,000 other outlets that also offered video rentals. Grocery stores in the United States rented tapes for as little as $0.49 as loss leaders. The press discussed the VCR "and the viewing habits it has engendered — the Saturday night trip down to the tape rental store to pick out for a couple of bucks the movie you want to see when you want to see it". Video rental stores had customers of all ages and were part of a fast-growing business. By 1987, for example, Pennsylvania had 537 stores that primarily rented videotapes, with annual spending per resident of $10.50. By 1989, six years after its founding, Philadelphia's West Coast Video operated over 700 stores in the United States, Canada, and the United Kingdom. In 1987, home video market revenues for the year surpassed box office revenues.

In the 1980s, it was common for shops to rent equipment—typically VHS recorders—as well as tapes. Some video shops also had adults-only sections containing X-rated videos. Some video stores exclusively sold X-rated suggestive films, often along with related sex shop items. To cope with the videotape format war of the 1970s and 1980s, some stores initially stocked both VHS and Betamax cassettes, while others specialized in one format or the other. During the 1980s, most stores eventually phased out their Betamax section and became all-VHS, contributing to the eventual demise of Beta as a home video format (nevertheless, the Beta form factor remained in use as a professional video format in broadcasting as Betacam).

=== 1990s–2021 ===
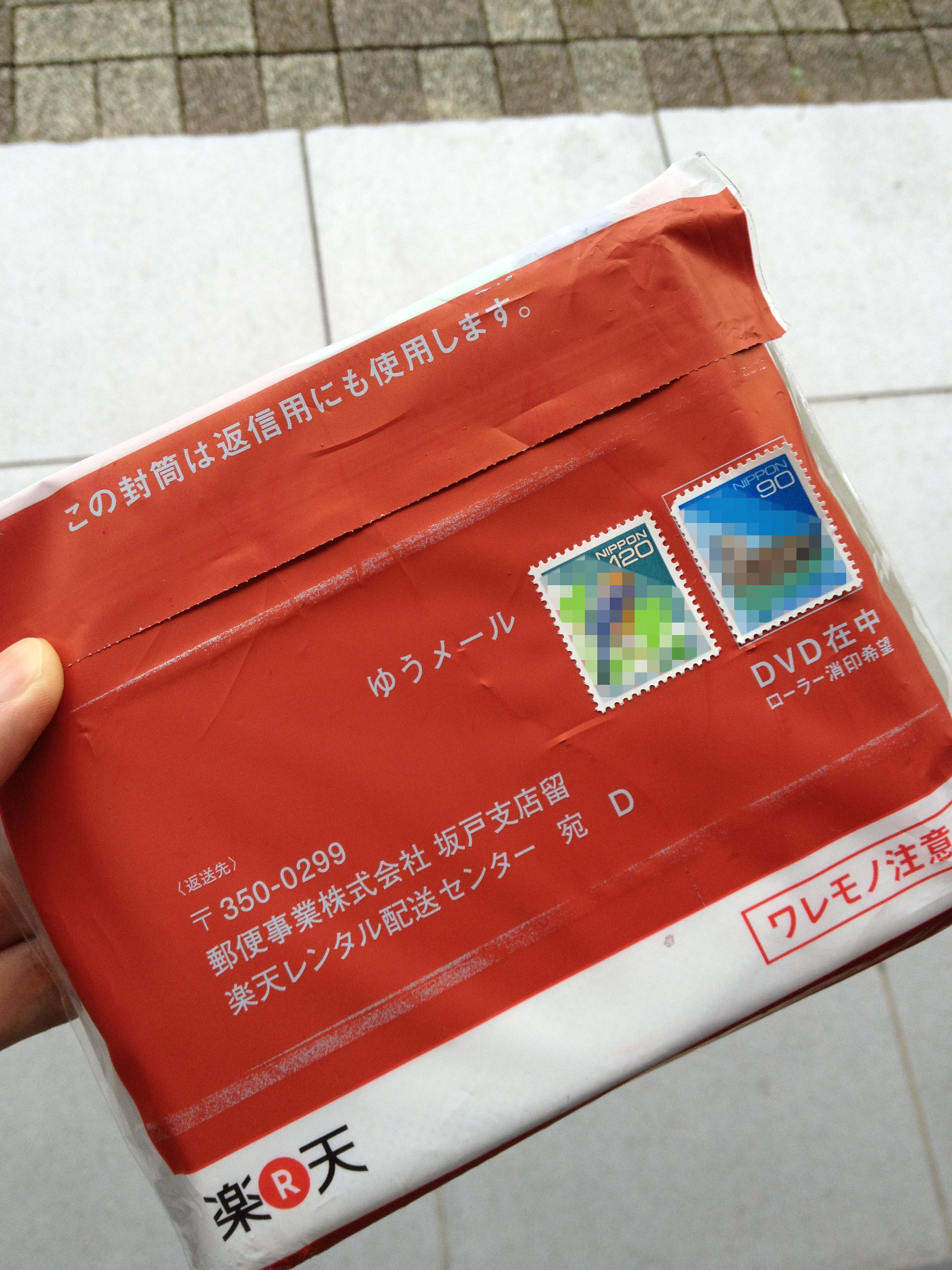
With the introduction of the thin, lightweight DVD disc, movie rental by mail services became feasible, introducing a new source of competition for brick and mortar stores.

In the late 1990s, DVDs began appearing in video rental stores. The format was smaller than tapes, allowing stores to stock more movies. As well, the thin, lightweight discs could be mailed, which made mail DVD services feasible. In the late 1990s, Netflix offered a per-rental model for each DVD but introduced a monthly subscription for DVDs concept in September 1999. The per-rental model was dropped by early 2000, allowing the company to focus on the business model of flat-fee unlimited rentals without due dates, late fees (a source of annoyance for bricks and mortar video store customers), shipping and handling fees, or per-title rental fees.

Rogers Video was the first chain to provide DVD rentals in Canada. Other chains and independent stores later transitioned to the newer format. Similarly, many video stores rented Blu-ray Disc movies after the high definition optical disc format war ended in the late 2000s.

Some firms rented DVDs from automatic kiosk machines such as Redbox. Customers selected a movie from a list using buttons, paid by credit card, and the movie popped out of a slot. While traditional brick and mortar video rental stores were closing at a high rate, Redbox moved into existing retail locations such as supermarkets, and placed kiosks within them or outside of them to gain access to that consumer base. As well, with Redbox, consumers could rent the movie at one kiosk (for example, one near their work) and return it to any Redbox kiosk (for example, one near their home), thus increasing convenience. Redbox surpassed Blockbuster in 2007 in the number of US locations, passed 100 million rentals in February 2008, and passed 1 billion rentals in September 2010.

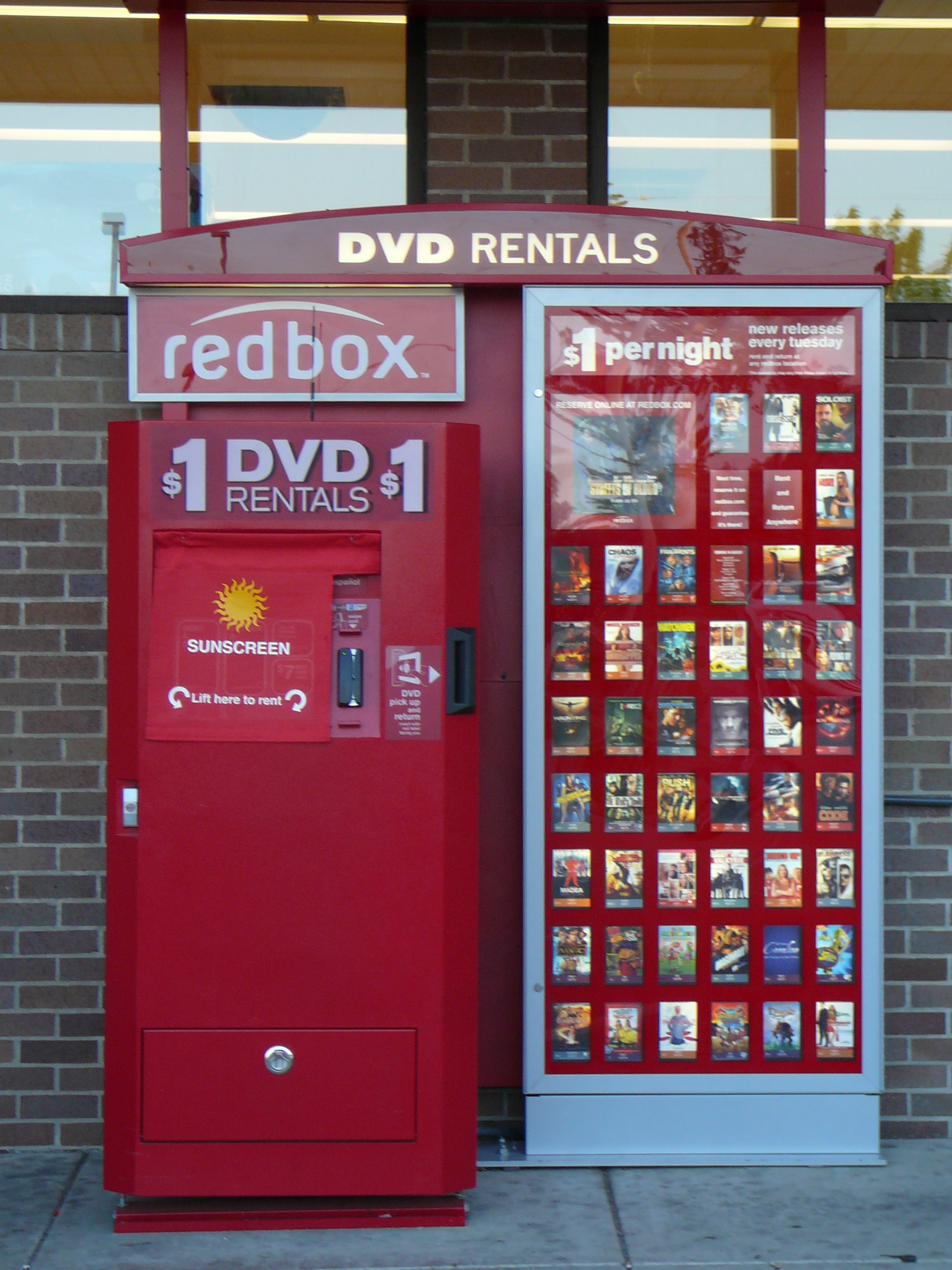
Redbox automated retail kiosk for DVD and video game disc rental outaisde a Walgreens in Macomb, Illinois, 2009

Automatic DVD kiosks still required consumers to leave home twice, to rent the movie and return it. Widespread availability of video on demand (VOD) on cable TV systems and VHS-by-mail and DVD-by-mail services offered consumers a way of watching movies without having to leave home. Consumers preferred the convenience of choosing movies at home.

With the advent of the World Wide Web, Internet services which streamed content as Netflix became increasingly popular starting in the mid–2000s. All the new ways of watching movies greatly reduced demand for video rental shops, and many closed as a result. In 2000, there were 27,882 stores renting videos open in the US, by late 2015, the number was down to 4,445. Over 86% of the 15,300 U.S. stores (specializing in video rentals) open in 2007 were reported to have closed by 2017, bringing the total to approximately 2,140 remaining stores. The total income from brick and mortar rentals for 2017 was about $390 million.

In 2018, the Blockbuster store in Bend, Oregon became the last Blockbuster store in the United States; in 2019, it became the world's last remaining retail store using the Blockbuster brand. A Netflix documentary about the store titled The Last Blockbuster was released in 2020.

In mid-June 2020, Malaysian video rental chain Speedy Video closed its 14 remaining shops in response to competition from satellite television and streaming platforms. In Asia, video rental stores faced the additional challenge of dealing with rampant video piracy.

On January 5, 2021, Glenview, Illinois-based Family Video announced it was closing all its remaining video rental stores. The company was the last remaining video rental chain in the United States; its closing marked the end of large video rental chains.

=== 2020s ===
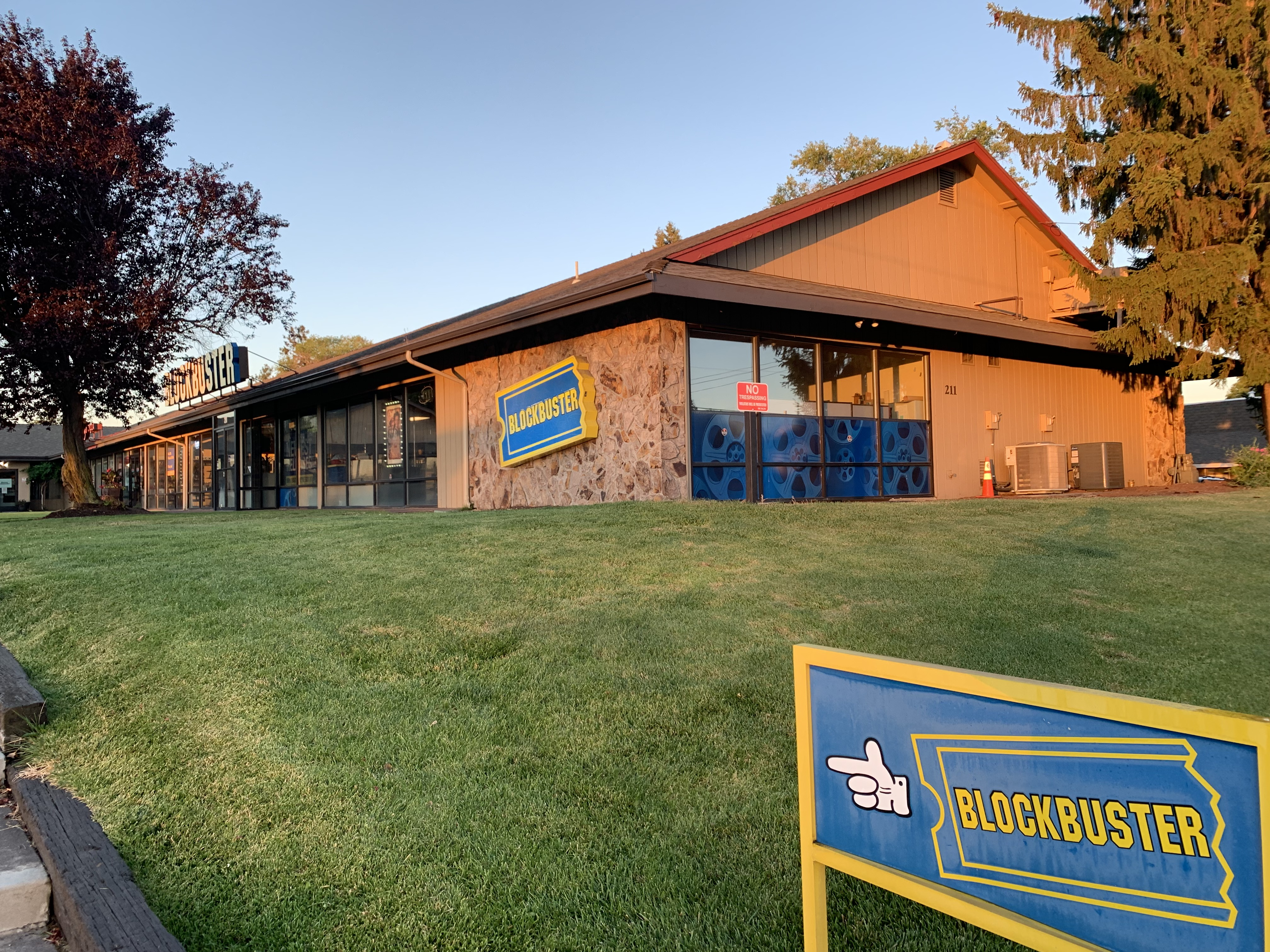
The last remaining Blockbuster store, located in Bend, Oregon

In the 2020s, some video stores facing the loss of their business model have adapted by becoming non-profit organizations that focus on preserving an archive of film heritage and educating people about cinema. Operating as a non-profit enables a video store to use volunteer personnel and apply for foundation grants, which can make it feasible to operate with less rental revenue. However, due to a rising interest in physical media among collectors, as well as nostalgic factors, a few independent video stores have remained open in North America.

Meanwhile, as of 2023, there are still more than 2,000 video rental stores in Japan, including Tsutaya and Geo. But like many other places, the number of stores in Japan is decreasing year by year.

In 2022, CBC News reported that Ottawa still has two DVD rental stores: Movies n' Stuff (12,000 titles for rent and 40,000 more in storage) and Glebe Video International (18,000 titles for rent). Movies n' Stuff's owner, Peter Thompson, attributes the continued interest in video rental stores to the rising cost of streaming subscription services and patrons' desire for the personalized film recommendations he provides.

On April 23, 2024, Chicken Soup for the Soul Entertainment, Redbox's parent, announced a $636.6 million loss in 2023, and warned that without any options to generate additional financing, the company may be forced to liquidate or pause operations, and seek a potential Chapter 11 bankruptcy protection filing. However, Chicken Soup for the Soul Entertainment did also report that Redbox's sales increased last year, seeing a 66% increase in annual revenue to $112.7 million. On June 29, 2024, the company filed for Chapter 11 bankruptcy protection after missing a week of paying its employees and failing to secure financing.

On July 10, 2024, a bankruptcy judge ordered to convert Chicken Soup for the Soul Entertainment's Chapter 11 bankruptcy into a Chapter 7 bankruptcy liquidation after accusing the company's previous CEO of misusing the business and failing to pay employees or support healthcare. Over 1,000 employees were laid off and over 26,000 Redbox kiosks will shut down permanently, marking the end of major physical video rental services in the United States.

In 2025, Night Owl Video, the first dedicated video store in New York since the closure of Kim's Video in 2014, opened in Williamsburg, Brooklyn. Co-owner Aaron Hamel cited the want for a sense of community and the growing popularity physical media and the tangibility of browsing in-person as opposed to online. The store has also reported that VHS tapes are growing in popularity amongst horror film fans.

== Legacy and sociocultural impact ==
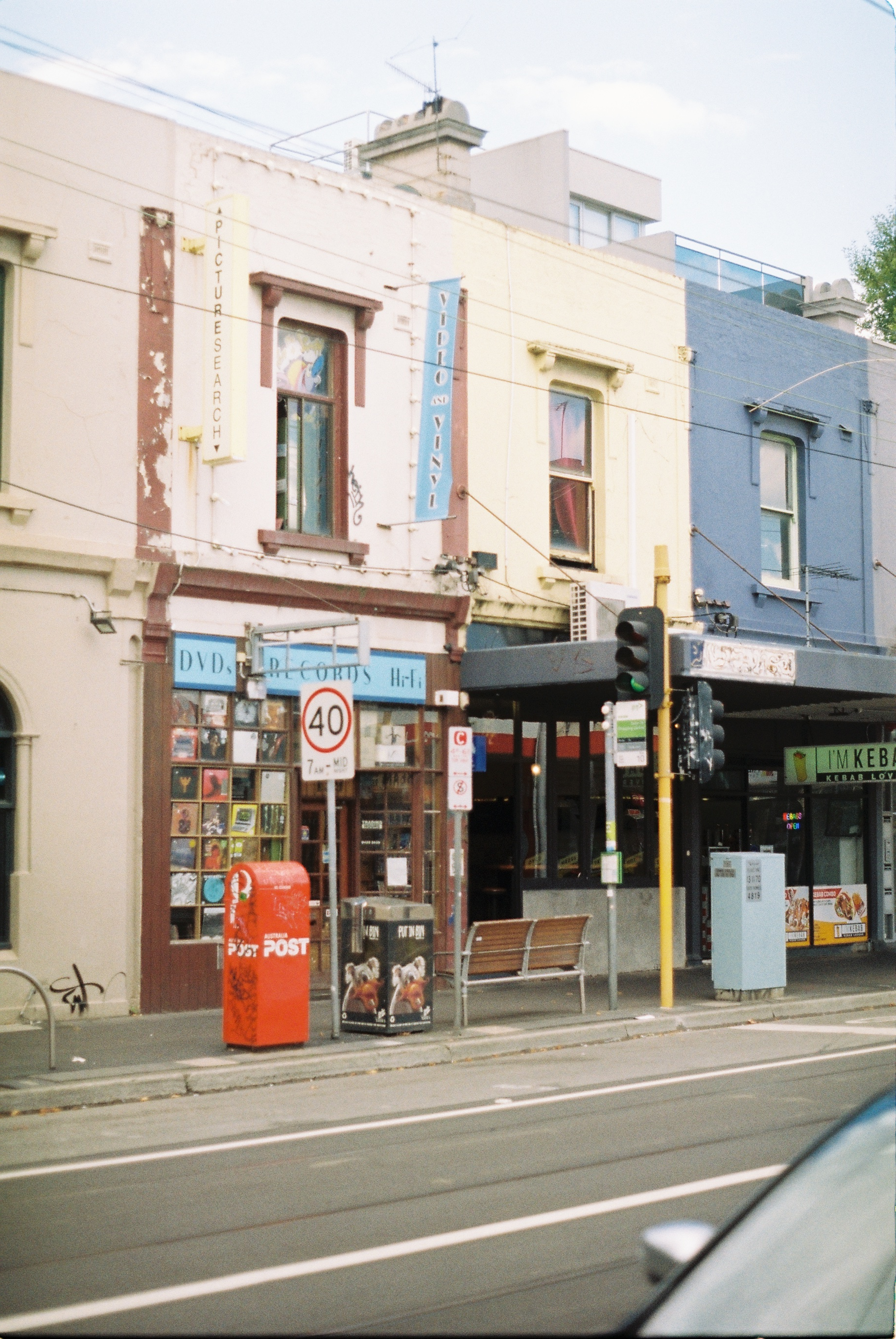
One of the last Video Stores in Australia in Richmond Australia

According to Daniel Herbert, a film professor at the University of Michigan, video rental stores "helped cement a local 'movie culture' and contribute to the social fabric of a community in small but meaningful ways", in that customers sought advice from staff on what film to rent or chatted with other customers about "what to watch and why."

Film critic Collin Souter states that video stores gave "film lovers" a place "to congregate" and make "discoveries by browsing" the racks of film shelves, with the store providing a "film school, a social gathering, a place of cinematic discovery, date nights, and rites of passage." He underscores the impact that video stores had by noting that when film director Quentin Tarantino, a former video rental store employee, learned that Video Archives in Hermosa Beach, California (the store he had worked at) was closing, he bought the entire "inventory and recreated the store in his basement", as for him, "that place [was] a lifesaver."

A 2018 article about video stores states that they are appealing because "people crave being together to pick entertainment" and the chance to "chat with a staff member" "who can be relied upon for reviews and recommendations and who truly love what they do"; at the same time, they are "part of a "community of like-minded individuals." One argument for video stores is the element of investment; if "you're taking time to walk into a physical place, grab something and take it home, you'll be at least a little bit invested."

As well, there is the "allure of browsing" the physical copies on the shelves (an appeal likened to the resurgence of interest in vinyl records in the 2020s).

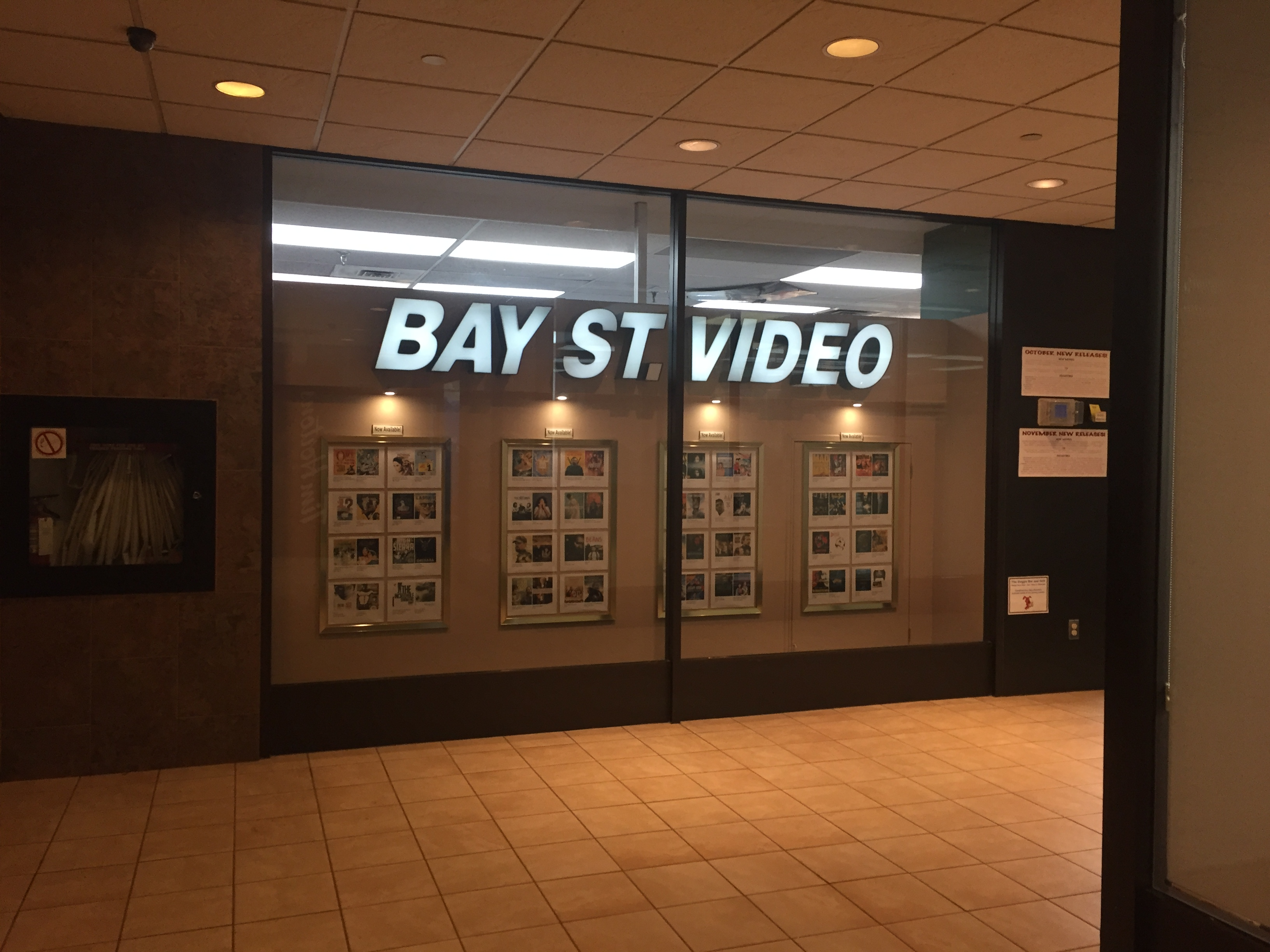
Bay St Video in Toronto has a large, varied selection that includes historic silent films.

Such video rental stores as Toronto's Bay St Video have a larger selection than a streaming platform's movie list. The owner of Bay St Video states that they "have movies that go back to the beginning of filmmaking, from the first silent films ever made to stuff that was just in theatres – and everything in between. We have the history of cinema.” He calls the store's selection of films "libraryesque – almost like an archive or a museum.” Benjamin Owens, the owner of Film is Truth, a non-profit video rental outlet, points out that video stores may carry a larger selection of films than streaming platforms; he notes that while the "largest streaming provider, Netflix, has only 6,000 titles", Film is Truth has over 20,000 titles. An additional benefit that video stores provide to communities is that they give access to films to people with poor access to Internet and those who are not comfortable with adapting to online consumption.

In 2010, Daniel Hanna, the owner of Toronto's Eyesore Cinema (an independent video shop) launched International Independent Video Store Day, which is held on the third Saturday of every October, to promote awareness of video rental stores and their unique contribution to film culture.

Film professor Daniel Herbert says that the demise of the video store may affect independent film production. He states that studios lost a major channel for low-budget, feature-length indie movies when the large video store chains collapsed. Streaming services are less likely to produce this format, as they prefer binge-watching-oriented serials. Richard Brody argues that between 1985 and 1995, there was "a generation of filmmakers that included Tarantino and Steven Soderbergh, whose first films, Reservoir Dogs and Sex, Lies, and Videotape, respectively, were financed" by the home video market. Brody argues that for aspiring filmmakers, video stores they worked at became "launching pads of true outsiders", and provided "counter-programming" to film school training by valorizing "anti-academic values of disorder, spontaneity, and enthusiasm."

Friday Night at the Video Store is a National Film Board documentary directed by Cédric Chabuel and Alexandra Viau that aims to "record and preserve a vestige of the brief existence" of five video store owners who "cling to their dream of keeping the video rental industry alive."

=== In popular culture ===
The impact of video rental stores on popular culture is attested to by filmmakers' use of video stores as a setting for a number of films from the 1980s to the 2000s. Examples include Be Kind Rewind (2008), in which Jack Black and Mos Def play rental store staff in a shop scheduled for demolition; Clerks (1994), which depicts a day in the life of two bored, annoyed clerks, one that works in a video store; Speaking Parts (1989), a film directed by Atom Egoyan about a video rental store customer whose obsession with a minor actor pushes her to rent every film he has a bit part in; Remote Control (1988), a science fiction film about alien brainwashing scheme that uses a message hidden in a VHS tape, in which Kevin Dillon plays the role of a video store clerk; Air Doll (2009) a Japanese film about a blow-up doll that comes to life and begins working in a video rental store; Bleeder (1999), a Nicolas Winding Refn film in which Mads Mikkelsen plays a lonely video store clerk; and Watching the Detectives (2007), a film in which Cillian Murphy plays a video store clerk who is a film buff who tries to get his customers interested in cinema. The 2026 video game Retro Rewind, set in 1990, is a shop simulator in which the player runs a video rental store.

The decline of chain video stores was later addressed by the documentary film The Last Blockbuster (2020) and the television sitcom Blockbuster (2022), a fictionalized version of the same premise.

== Rental and copyright ==
Renting books, optical discs, tapes, and movies is covered by copyright law. Copyright owners sometimes put warning notices on the packaging of products such as DVDs to deter copyright infringement such as copying of movies.

In Canada, movies are protected under the Canadian Copyright Act, so shifting from one format to another (e.g. "ripping" a digital copy of a rental DVD movie) is illegal. In 2012, public school teachers were granted some exemptions for the exhibition of films, when the Canadian Parliament passed the Copyright Modernization Act. Teachers can show "copyrighted commercially available movies for educational purposes", so long as it is part of a "classroom curriculum related context."

In the United States, Title 17 of the United States Code indicates that it is "illegal to reproduce a copyrighted work" such as a rented VHS tape or DVD movie.

In some cases, consumer rights in Europe and the US are significantly broader than those described in copyright warning labels. In the U.S., with narrow exceptions for religious and educational purposes, a person who shows a rental video outside of a home must pay for an exhibition license.

== Gallery ==
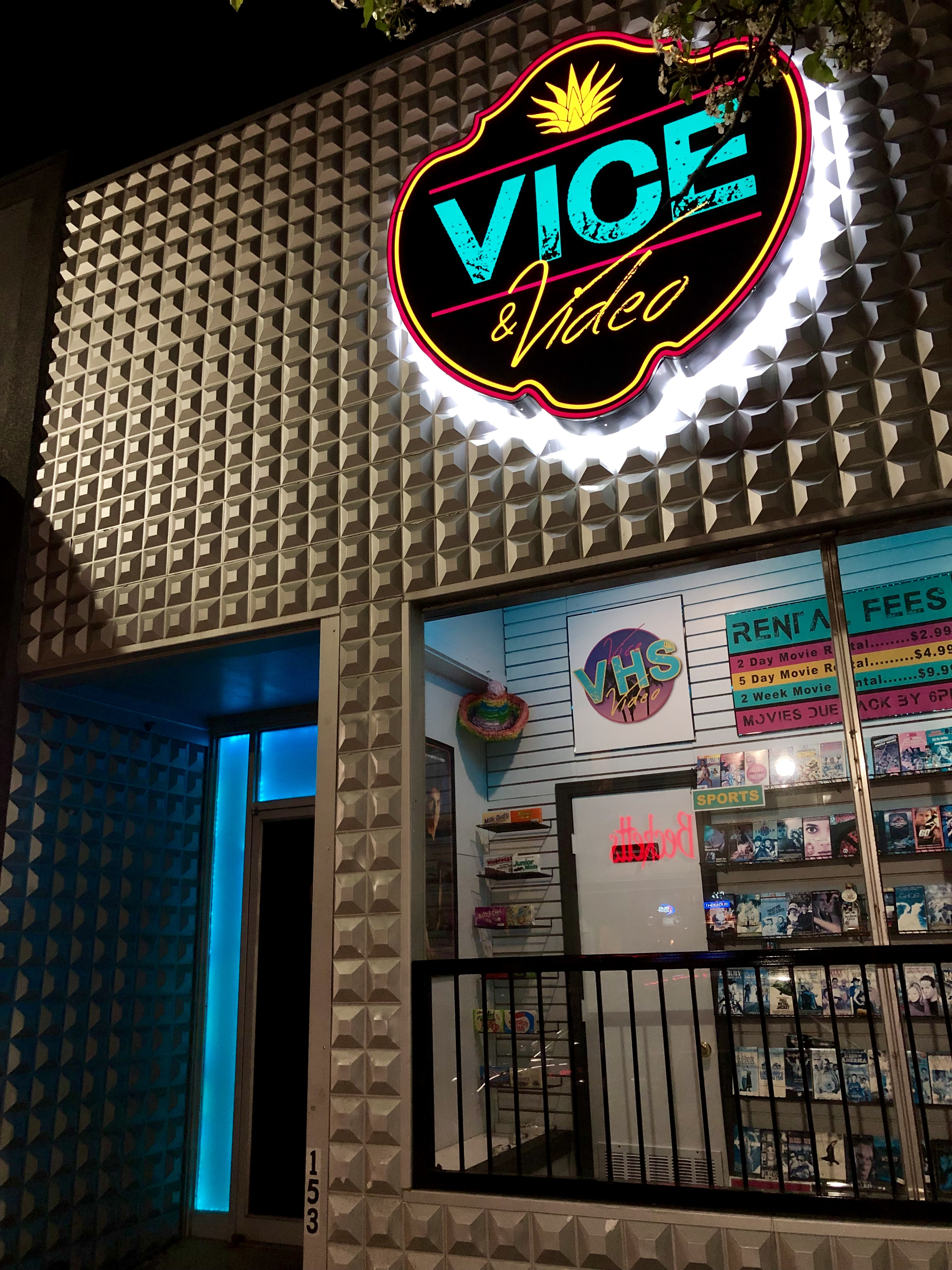
Vice & Video rentals and bar in Ohio

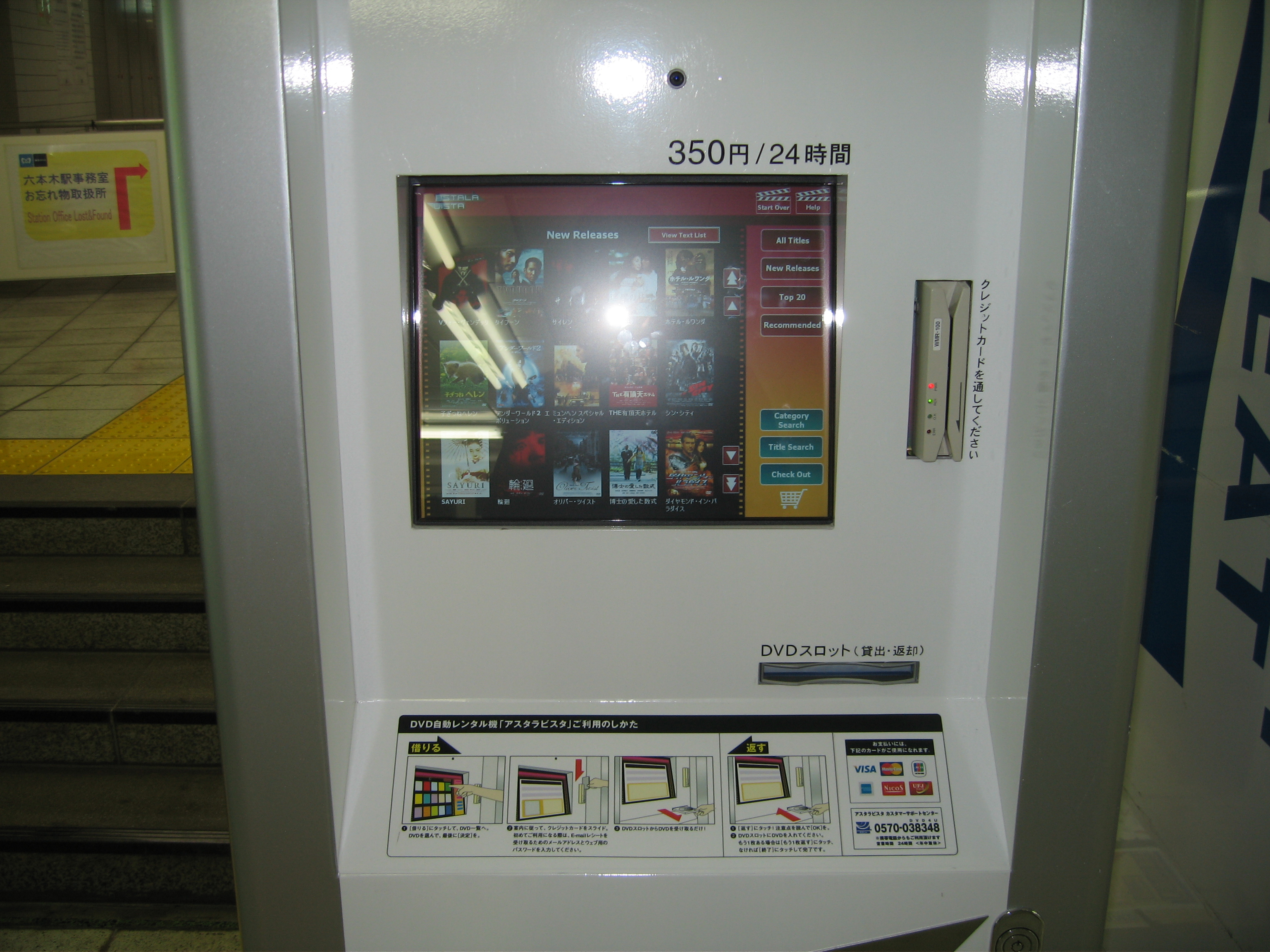
A DVD rental machine in Japan

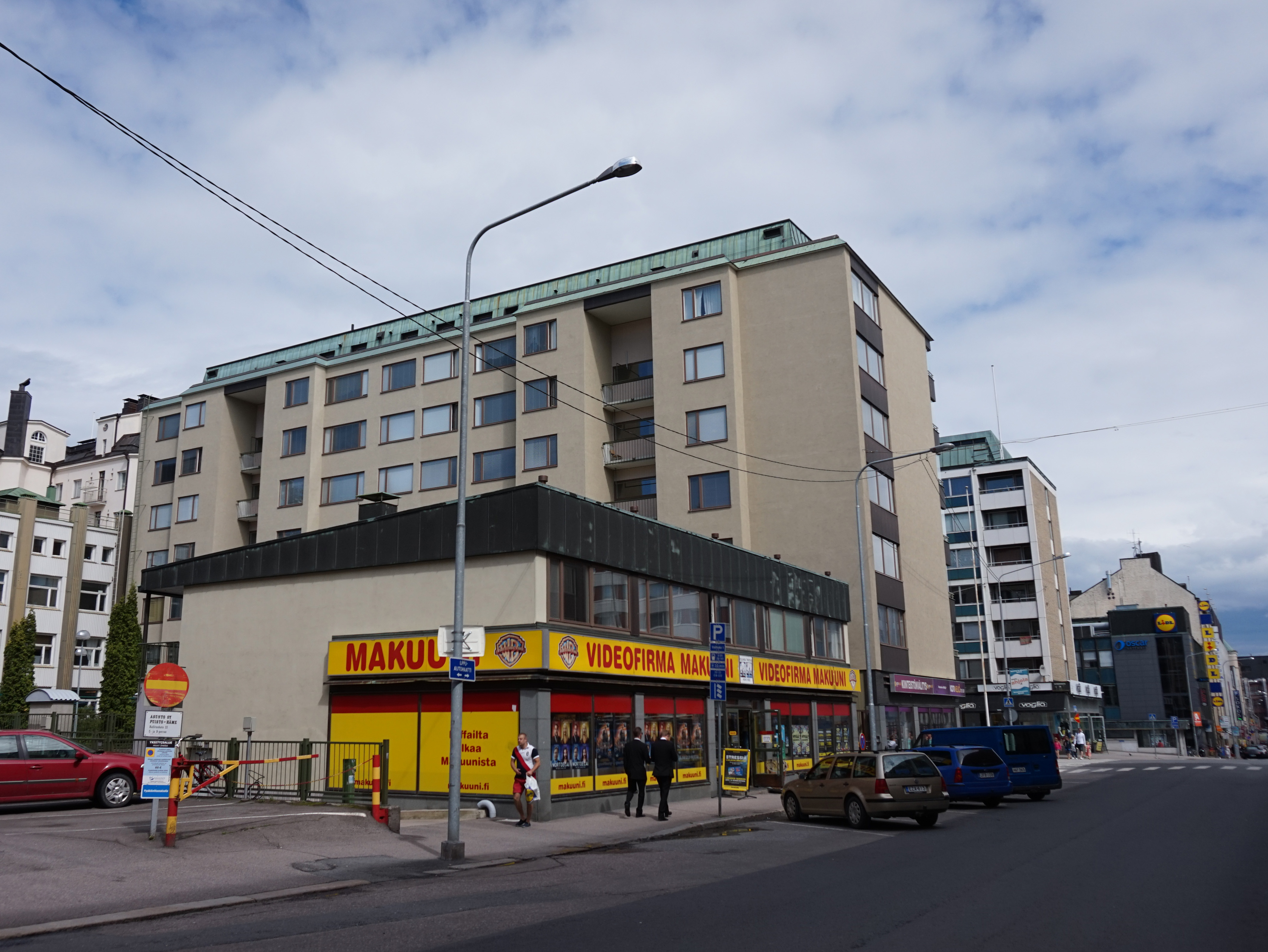
Videofirma Makuuni, former video rental shop on Hallituskatu Street in Tampere, Finland in 2015

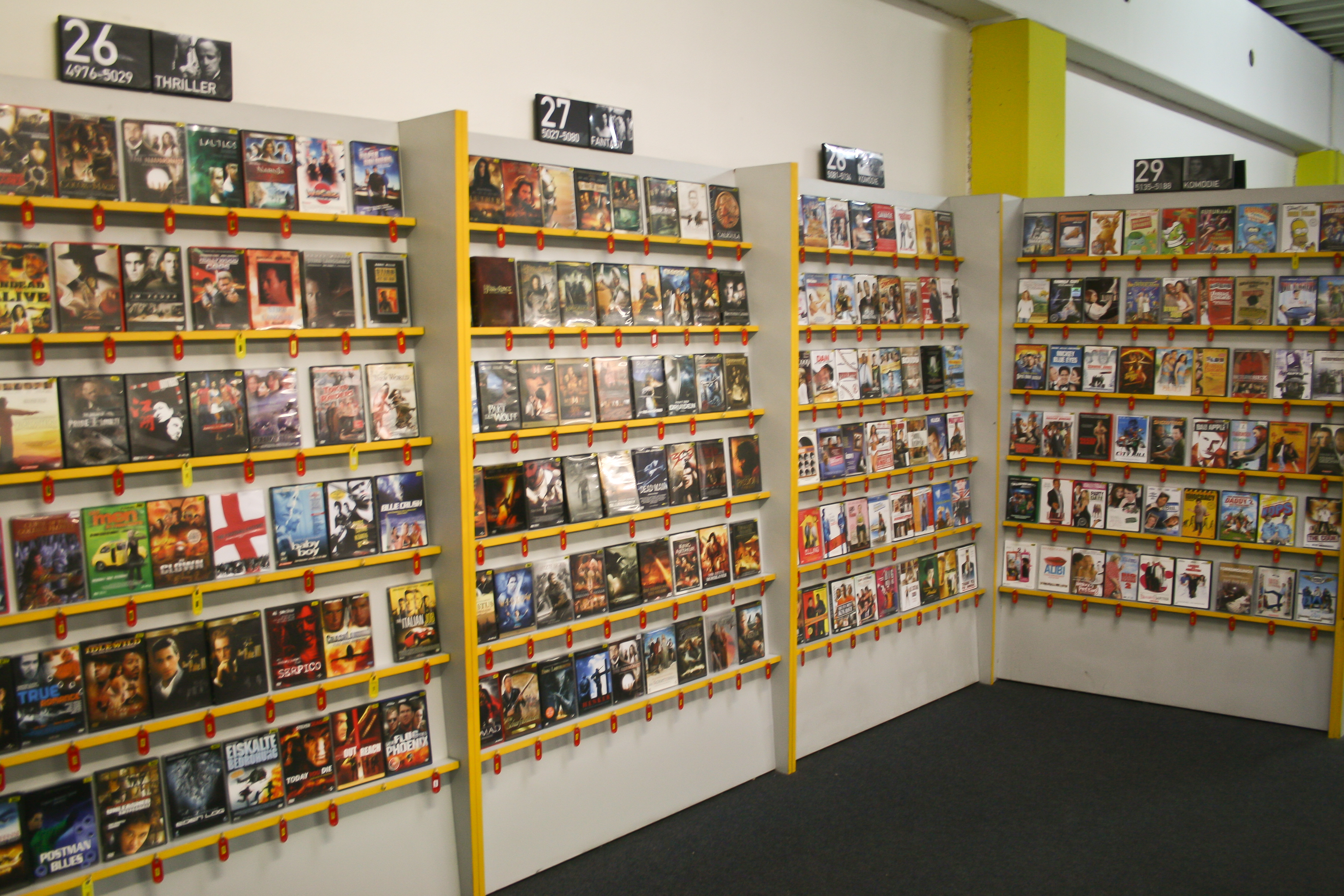
A video rental store in Salzburg, Austria in 2009

== Top film rentals in the US ==
=== 1990 ===
Rank	Title	Revenue	Inflation
1	Ghost	$90,000,000	$220,000,000
2	Pretty Woman	$85,000,000	$210,000,000
3	Total Recall	$70,000,000	$170,000,000
4	Die Hard 2	$68,000,000	$170,000,000
5	Teenage Mutant Ninja Turtles	$65,000,000	$160,000,000
6	Dick Tracy	$60,000,000	$150,000,000
7	Back to the Future III	$47,000,000	$120,000,000
8	Gremlins 2	$22,000,000	$54,000,000

=== Up until 1998 ===
Rank	Title	Revenue	Inflation
1	Star Wars Special Edition	$270,900,000	$540,000,000
2	E.T. the Extra-Terrestrial	$228,160,000	$460,000,000

=== 1987–1992 ===
Rank	Title
1	Top Gun
2	Pretty Woman
3	Home Alone
4	The Little Mermaid
5	Ghost
6	Beauty and the Beast
7	Terminator 2: Judgment Day
8	Forrest Gump
9	The Lion King
10	Dances with Wolves

=== 1993–1996 ===
Rank	1993	1994	1995	1996
1	Sister Act	Mrs. Doubtfire	Forrest Gump	Braveheart
2	Under Siege	The Fugitive	The Lion King	Babe
3	A Few Good Men	The Firm	True Lies	Twister
4	The Bodyguard	Ace Ventura: Pet Detective	The Mask	Seven
5	Beauty and the Beast	Jurassic Park	Speed	Independence Day
6	Aladdin	Tombstone	Dumb and Dumber	The Net
7	Unforgiven	Sleepless in Seattle	The Shawshank Redemption	Jumanji
8	Home Alone 2: Lost in New York	Aladdin	The Santa Clause	Casino
9	Lethal Weapon 3	Barney	Pulp Fiction	Waterworld
10	The Last of the Mohicans	Cliffhanger	Legends of the Fall	Toy Story

=== 1997 ===
Top video rentals of 1997
Rank	Title	Rentals	Revenue	Inflation
1	Jerry Maguire	22,500,000	$60,190,000	$120,720,000
2	Liar Liar	20,910,000	$57,410,000	$115,140,000
3	A Time to Kill	18,770,000	$50,710,000	$101,700,000
4	The First Wives Club	17,820,000	$47,840,000	$95,950,000
5	Ransom	17,390,000	$46,780,000	$93,820,000
6	Phenomenon	17,260,000	$46,240,000	$92,740,000
7	Scream	16,500,000	$44,910,000	$90,070,000
8	Michael	15,820,000	$42,510,000	$85,260,000
9	The Long Kiss Goodnight	15,530,000	$41,350,000	$82,930,000
10	Sleepers	15,160,000	$41,020,000	$82,270,000

== See also ==
- Book rental service
- DVD-by-mail
