= Free Blockbuster =

Neighborhood movie exchange nonprofit

- Founded: 2018
- Founder: Brian A Morrison
- Headquarters: Hollywood, Los Angeles, California
- Website: freeblockbuster.org

Free Blockbuster is an initiative that promotes free neighborhood movie exchanges through kiosks installed across North America. The group's logo derives its name and logo from Blockbuster, a video rental shop. Founded by Brian A Morrison, a former Blockbuster employee, the group took some inspiration from Little Free Library when developing the initiative. There are over 200 Free Blockbuster Boxes across the United States as of 2024.

== History ==
The initiative was started in 2019 by film enthusiasts in Los Angeles, including Brian A Morrison, a former Blockbuster employee who opened the first site outside of a grocery store in Los Feliz, Los Angeles. Free Blockbuster stands were later installed on the east coast of the United States the following year starting with Richmond, Virginia. Further adoption occurred in the Philadelphia region, with the site in Fishtown becoming the eighteenth Free Blockbuster box installed in the country by November 2020. The first box in Canada was installed in June 2021.

In November 2020, Dish Network, which owns the brand name for Blockbuster, sent Morrison a letter urging him to stop using the logo and the name Blockbuster. Morrison called one of Dish Network's intellectual property lawyers about licensing out to the Blockbuster trademark to Free Blockbuster, which was not initially granted. The following year, Dish Network returned an email to Morrison informing them that they were in open to a licensing agreement with him. Dish Network now maintains an amicable relationship with the initiative's organizers to authorize the use of the trademark.

A Free Blockbuster swap shop opened in 2025 in San Antonio, Texas.

== Description ==
Free Blockbuster boxes are made by upcycling abandoned newspaper distribution boxes. They use the brand name Blockbuster on the kiosks which feature a Blockbuster logo downloadable from the Free BlockBuster website.

== See also ==
- Blockbuster (Bend, Oregon), the final Blockbuster store still in operation, as of 2024
- Community fridge
- Little Free Library
- Mutual aid
- Public bookcase, for history and generic aspects of the practice
