= Todd Bol =

Founder of Little Free Library (1956–2018)

Todd H. Bol
- Born: January 2, 1956; North St. Paul, Minnesota, U.S.
- Died: October 18, 2018 (aged 62); Hudson, Wisconsin, U.S.
- Education: University of Wisconsin–River Falls
- Occupations: Teacher, public bookcase maker
- Years active: 2009–2018
- Known for: Founder of Little Free Library

Todd Herbert Bol (January 2, 1956 – October 18, 2018) was the creator and founder of Little Free Library, a global public bookcase nonprofit organization. In 2009, he used wood from his old garage door to make the first library-on-a-stick as a tribute to his mother, June Bol, while living in Hudson, Wisconsin. As of 2016, the project had expanded to include Little Free Libraries in 85 countries. According to a 2018 article, there are now more than 75,000 Little Free Libraries in 88 countries.

Bol worked as a public school teacher for five years in Circle Pines and Cambridge, Minnesota. Later, he founded an international trade company called Global Scholarship Alliance, which provides nursing scholarships for advanced nursing. He also founded Care Forth, Inc., an entrepreneurial consulting firm.

Bol died from pancreatic cancer in 2018 at the age of 62. Just before he died, Todd Bol said his hope is for the rest of us to keep his efforts going - a kid with dyslexia who grew up with a dream of bringing books to every block and every person in this world.
