= Free store =

Free store may refer to:

- Give-away shop, a shop where all items are available at no cost
- In computer programming, a region of memory used for dynamic memory management
