= Ziilch =

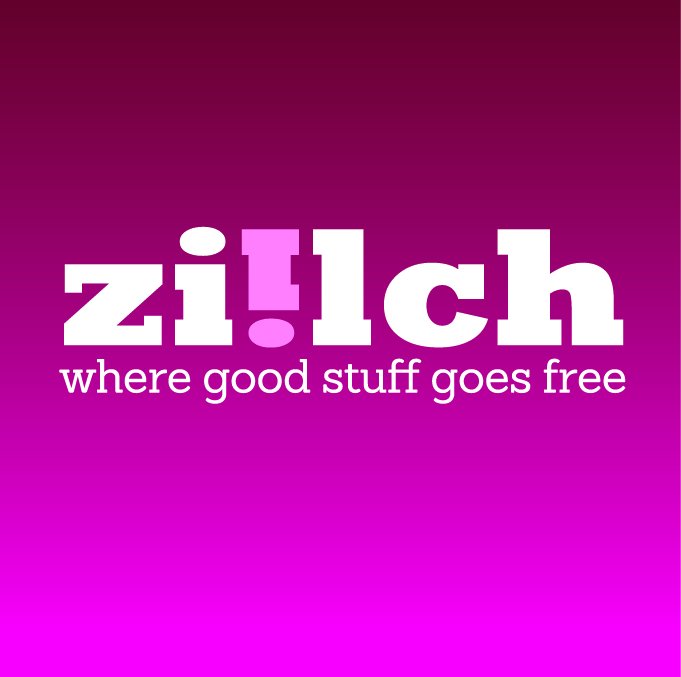
- Website type: Giveaways
- Available in: English
- Founded: 2010; 16 years ago
- Country of origin: Australia
- Area served: Australia
- Founder: Michelle Power
- Website: au.ziilch.com
- Launched: July, 2011

Ziilch is a free community driven website that provides Australians a way to give away items they no longer want to other people who may need them. Users can list items on Ziilch and receive items through Ziilch without paying to do so.

== History ==
Ziilch was founded in 2010 by Michelle Power. The idea was conceived in order to combat hard-rubbish dumping and to reduce the number of household items being sent to landfill. The website officially launched in July 2011.

== Process ==
The site can be browsed by anyone. However, signing up is required if the user wants to request or give away items. A person takes a picture of the item they wish to give away, assigns it a category, and gives it a description. The item is then posted on the site. Other members can register their interest for the item by clicking the request button. The person who listed the item is notified via both email and on-site notification of these requests, and they can choose at their discretion who they wish to give the item to. Once this decision is made, the two parties communicate via email to organise the collection of the item. Some items cannot be listed.

== Media ==
Ziilch has been featured regularly in the media since its launch, including a featured story on Channel 9's A Current Affair in 2012 and 2013, as well as a featured story on Channel 7's Today Tonight in 2012. The service has also been featured on news.com.au, StartupSmart and in the Herald Sun.
