= Community Fridges Toronto =

Nonprofit organization based in Toronto, Canada

Community Fridges Toronto (CFTO) is a network of public fridges with free food run by volunteers in Toronto, Ontario, Canada with the intent of providing mutual aid to those in need, such as the homeless and people with food insecurity. The network was co-created by Jalil Bokhari and his friend Julian Bentivegna to help support the homeless population in the Alexandra Park neighborhood in Toronto. As of May 2022, there are eight CFTO fridges in Toronto.

In November 2020, CFTO was forced to remove one of their public fridges in the Parkdale neighborhood by the City of Toronto due to "public safety and accessibility concerns", citing the "abandoned appliance bylaw" meant to protect children "and sanitation issues related to stopping the spread of COVID-19." After the removal, the Parkdale community moved the fridge to another location.

Other community food security initiatives in Toronto

· Road to Zero Waste, co-founded in December 2017 by Laylo Atakhodjaeva and her husband Shabeeb Hasan, is a registered charitable organization, and has four community fridges in Toronto and a combined total of nine community fridges in the Greater Toronto Area as of July 2024.

· Toronto Little Free Pantries Project, started in April 2020, is a grassroots not for profit initiative of different individuals hosting a pantry in their community, and shows approximately sixty little free pantries in Toronto on the map on its website as of July 2024.

· The Personal Care Bank, founded by William Emilio in October 2021, is a grassroots not for profit community run initiative, and lists thirteen locations on its website as of July 2024: ten in Toronto (three of which are at Toronto Public Library branches); two in Peterborough, Ontario; and one in New Westminster, British Columbia.

· Community Food Hub, founded by Sitra Suleiman in March 2022, is a grassroots not for profit volunteer led initiative, featuring a community fridge and little free pantry, and has two locations in Scarborough as of July 2024.
