= Danielle Cantor =

- Occupations: Writer, photographer, activist
- Organization(s): Culture of Solidarity; House of Solidarity
- Known for: Cultural activist

Danielle Cantor is an Israeli writer, photographer and cultural activist. Cantor is one of the co-founders of the mutual aid organizations a Culture of Solidarity (COS) and the House of Solidarity (HOS).

== Career ==
Through her Culture of Consumption project Cantor uses food and culture to explore Israeli and Palestinian identity politics. She published her book Spreads through Hell No Publication & Distribution.

Cantor and Alma Beck co-founded A Culture of Solidarity in 2020 in Tel Aviv at the outbreak of COVID-19 pandemic.

"In early March, when we realized that restaurants and offices will soon be shutting down due to the Corona crisis, potentially resulting in obscene amounts of food waste, we decided to collect their surplus food, with the intention of cooking warm meals for the homeless. But when we received more donations than we could possibly cook, we realized that rather than offering a meal for the day, it made more sense to help underserved folks prepare for the coming weeks––and what eventually became months, When access to social services and aid would be very limited."

Together Cantor and Beck opened the House of Solidarity in October 2021. This community space hosts solidarity activities and events as well as the Solidarity Library. Cantor has been part of the Women Peace Sit-In in silent vigils calling for an immediate ceasefire and lasting peace in the Middle East. Cantor was chosen as one of the BBC's 100 inspiring women in 2024.

"When women tap into their inherent empathy, we can truly recognise systems of injustice and reimagine our way forward."
