= Little Free Library =

Neighborhood book exchange nonprofit

Little Free Library Ltd.
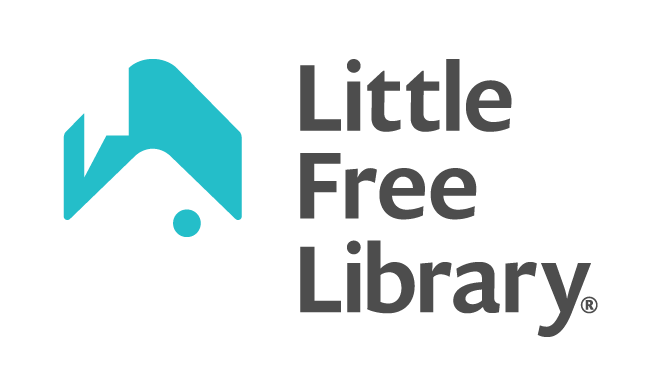

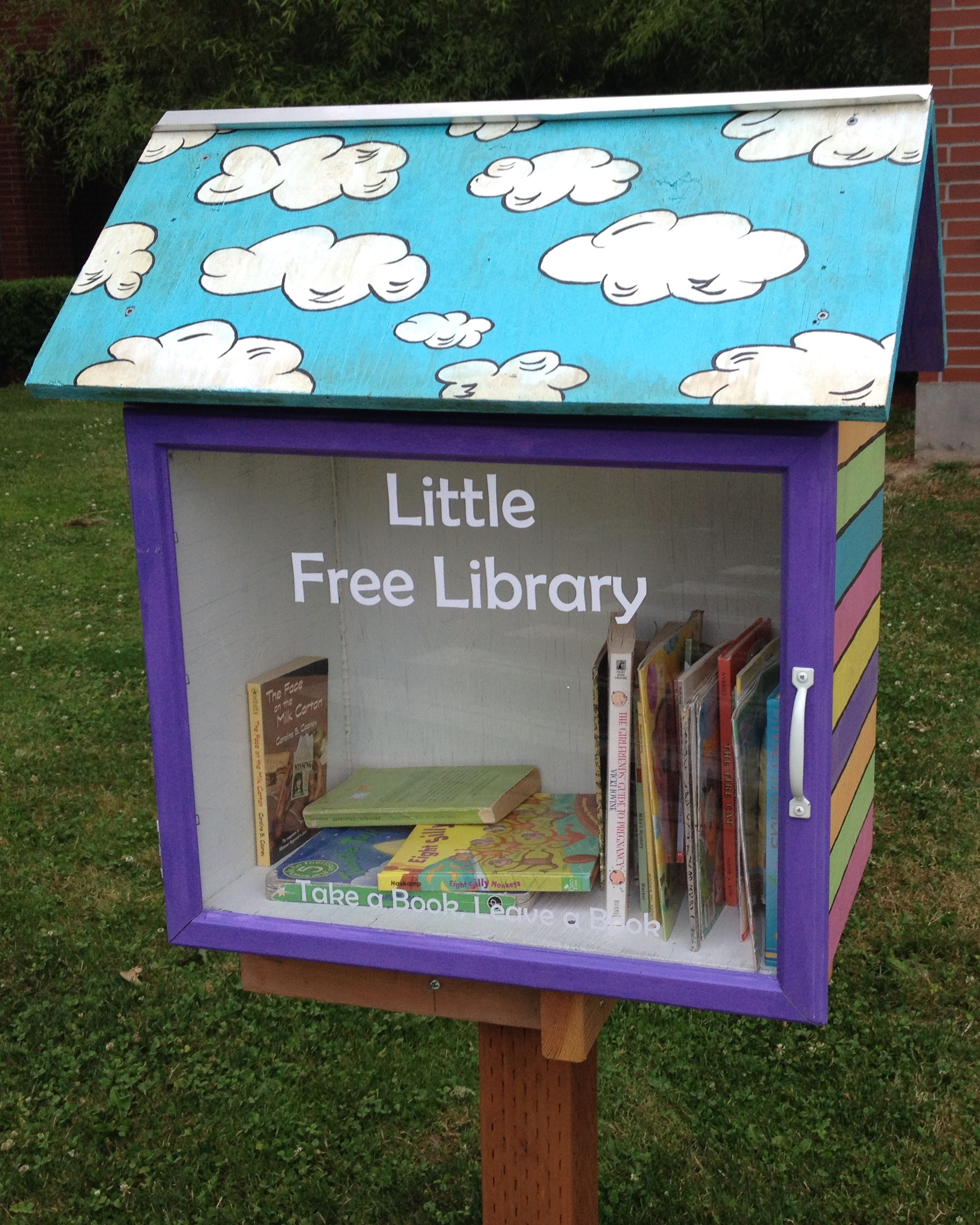
- A Little Free Library
- Founded: 2009
- Founder: Todd Bol
- Type: 501(c)(3) nonprofit organization
- Tax ID no.: 45-4043708
- Headquarters: St. Paul, Minnesota
- Executive Director: Greig Metzger
- Revenue: $4,350,241 (2021)
- Expenses: $3,489,818 (2021)
- Employees: 13 (2022)
- Volunteers: 60,000 (2022)
- Website: littlefreelibrary.org

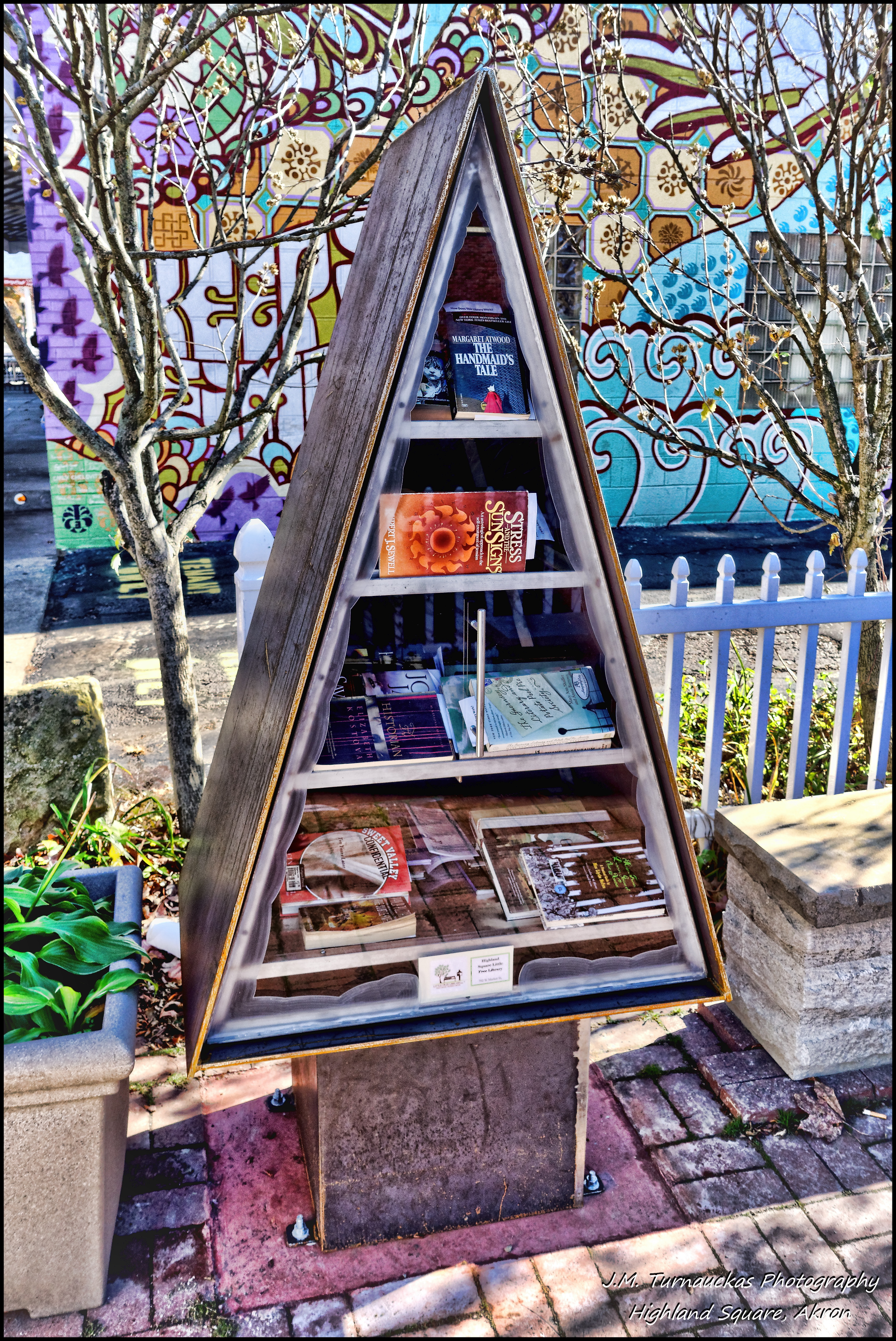
A 'collaboration with the Highland Square Branch of Akron Public Library, and Jim King owner of Angel Falls.' In Highland Square, Akron, Ohio

Little Free Library is a 501(c)(3) nonprofit organization that promotes neighborhood book exchanges, usually in the form of a public bookcase. More than 150,000 public book exchanges are registered with the organization and branded as Little Free Libraries. Through Little Free Libraries, present in 115 countries, millions of books are exchanged each year, with the aim of increasing access to books for readers of all ages and backgrounds. The Little Free Library nonprofit organization is based in St. Paul, Minnesota, United States.

== History ==
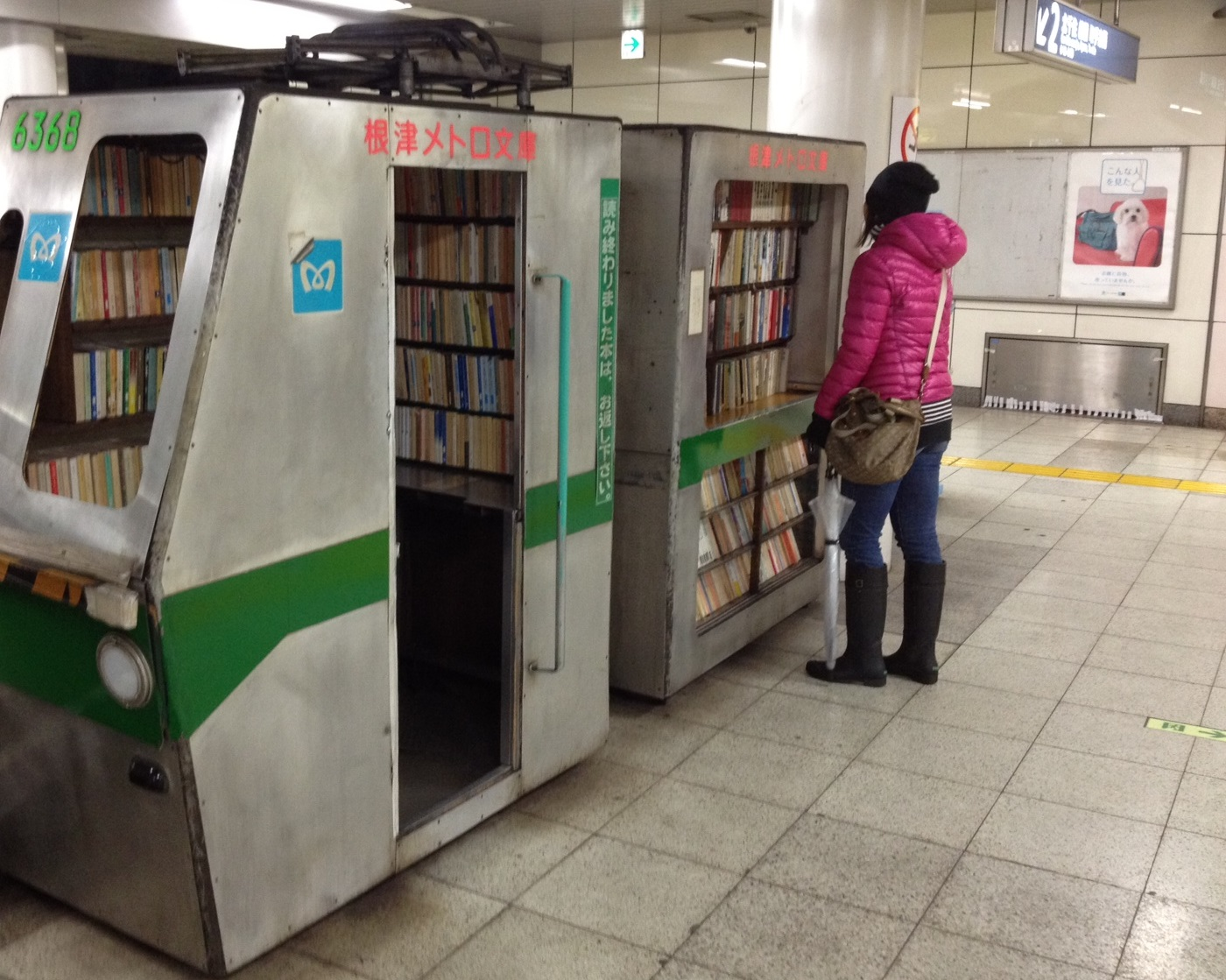
Little Free Library in a Tokyo Metro station

The first Little Free Library was built in 2009 by the late Todd Bol in Hudson, Wisconsin. Bol mounted a wooden container, designed to look like a one-room schoolhouse, on a post on his lawn and filled it with books as a tribute to his late mother, a book lover and school teacher who had recently died. Bol shared his idea with his partner, Rick Brooks, and together they built and installed more of the bookhouses in different areas of the Midwestern United States. After a while, the idea started to spread.

Little Free Library officially incorporated as a nonprofit organization on May 16, 2012, and the Internal Revenue Service recognized Little Free Library as a 501(c)(3) nonprofit organization later that year.

Bol's original goal was the creation of 2,510 Little Libraries. This would surpass the number of libraries founded by Andrew Carnegie, in a program where library buildings were constructed and endowed in cities across the United States. That goal was met in 2012.

The movement also was adopted internationally. By November 2016, there were 50,000 registered Little Free Libraries in 85 countries worldwide. Margret Aldrich wrote The Little Free Library Book to chronicle the movement.

As of August 2019 the number of Little Free Libraries has increased to more than 90,000 such bookhouses in 91 countries around the world.

In 2020, Dr. Russell Schnell added a Little Free Library to Antarctica, meaning that there are Little Free Libraries on all seven continents.

Bol died from pancreatic cancer in October 2018. M. Greig Metzger II joined the organization as executive director in July 2019.

In July 2022, LFL moved its headquarters from Hudson, Wisconsin to St. Paul, Minnesota.

== Legacy and honors ==
The Little Free Library nonprofit has been honored by the National Book Foundation in 2013 and received the Innovation in Reading Prize, the Library of Congress 2015, Library Journal, and others for its work promoting literacy and a love of reading. In addition, in 2013 the American Library Association presented Bol and Brooks the Movers and Shakers award.

The Little Free Library organization has used funds raised to donate book exchanges through their Impact Library Program, champion diverse books through their Read in Color Program, and create a reading program called the Action Book Club, which combines reading with community service.

== Function ==
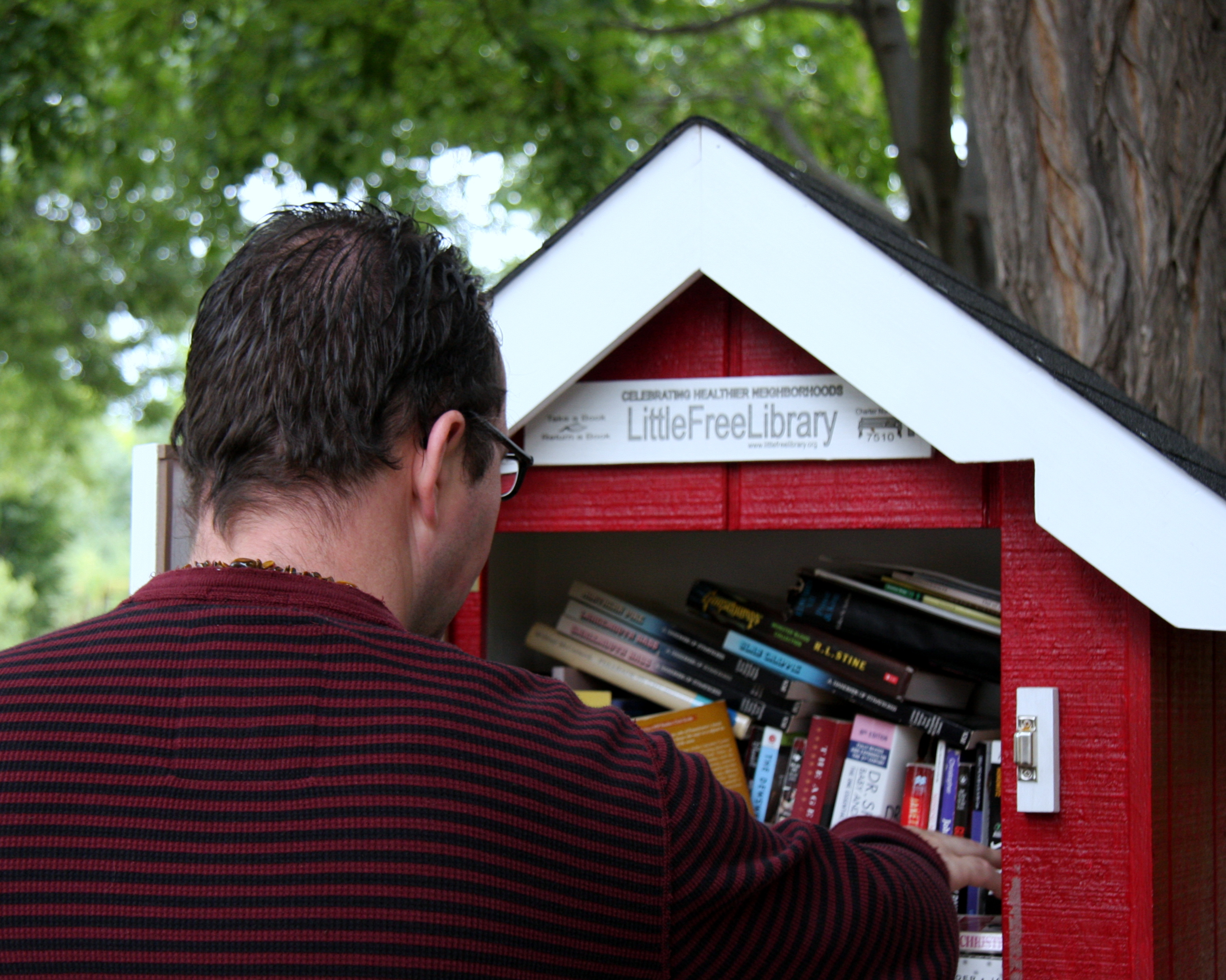
A reader browsing a Little Free Library

Like other public book exchanges, a passerby can take a book to read or leave one for someone else to find. The organization relies on volunteer "stewards" to construct, install, and maintain book exchange boxes. For a book exchange box to be registered and legally use the Little Free Library brand name, stewards must purchase a finished book exchange, a kit or, for a DIY project, a charter sign, which contains the "Little Free Library" text and official charter number.

Registered Little Free Libraries can appear on the Little Free Library World Map, which lists locations with GPS coordinates and other information. A Little Free Library mobile application was introduced in 2022. It is free to download. Little Free Libraries are located around the world; the majority are located in the United States.

Little Free Libraries of all shapes and sizes exist, from small, brightly painted wooden houses to a larger library based on Doctor Who's TARDIS.

The organization also provides links to free plans for enthusiasts to build their own Free Library.

== Zoning regulations ==
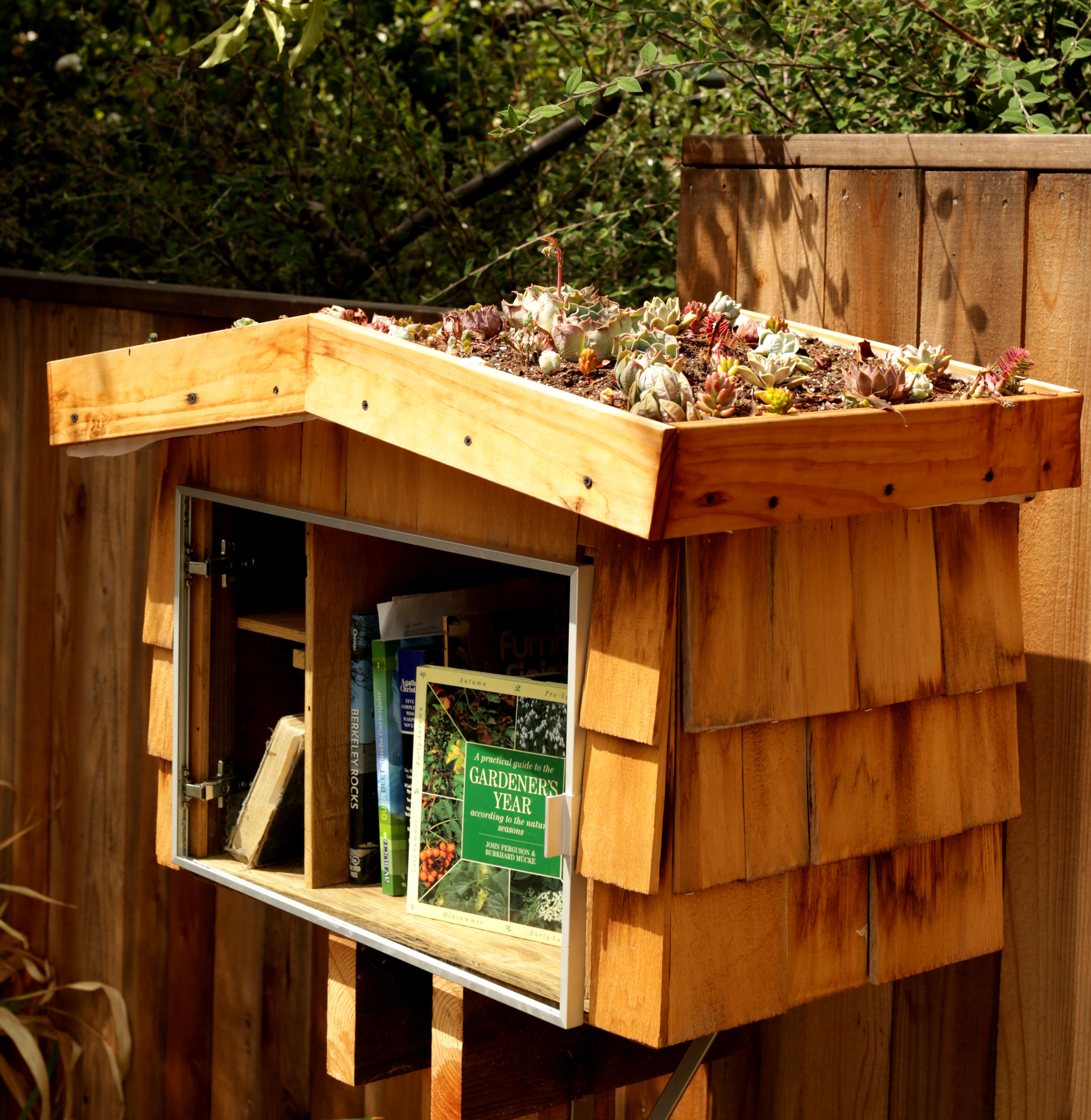
Little Free Libraries may be designed and decorated to fit their surroundings or to stand out.

Little Free Libraries are typically welcomed by communities; if zoning problems arise, local governments often work with residents to find solutions.

In late 2012, the village of Whitefish Bay, Wisconsin, denied permission to potential Little Free Library projects and required that an existing Little Free Library be removed because of a village ordinance that prohibited structures in front yards. Village trustees also worried about inappropriate material being placed in the boxes. However, in August 2013, the village approved a new ordinance that specifically allowed Little Free Library boxes to be put up on private property.

On June 17, 2015 Portland, Oregon Mayor Charlie Hales declared it "Little Community Kiosk day" in response to community confusion over right-of-way rules. On that day, he and the Portland City Council amended city code to allow for community kiosks such as Little Free Libraries in neighborhoods.

In June 2014, city officials in Leawood, Kansas shut down a Little Free Library under a city ordinance prohibiting detached structures. The family of Spencer Collins, the nine-year-old boy who built the structure, created a Facebook page to support the amendment of Leawood's city code. Another resident of the city who erected a Little Free Library was threatened with a $25 fine. In July, the city council unanimously approved a temporary moratorium to permit Little Free Libraries on private property.

On January 29, 2015, the Metropolitan Planning Commission in Shreveport, Louisiana shut down a Little Free Library. Zoning administrator Alan Clarke said that city ordinances permitted libraries only in commercial zones and that the one that was shut down had “bothered someone.” The following month, the city council temporarily legalized book exchange boxes until the zoning ordinances could be amended to permanently allow them.

In North America, Little Free Libraries, and, implicitly, other public bookcases, have been criticized for being placed mostly in neighborhoods of wealthier, well-educated people, where there are already high-quality traditional public libraries nearby. The commentator encourages groups to assist neighborhoods where such facilities are lacking.

In the August/September 2022 issue of Reason magazine, reporter Christian Britschgi wrote on Little Free Library's impact as part of a movement against cumbersome and overreaching zoning regulations in the United States:

The fact that a single three-feet-by-three-feet box of books can be illegal in two different ways illustrates the uphill battle homeowners can face when trying to set up their own libraries. The reams of rules governing what can go where in America's single-family neighborhoods set endless traps for unwary librarians... It would be easier to name the types of human activity that zoning laws don't restrict than to list all those they regulate. Even the most harmless activities can run afoul of these codes. But unlike most things tripped up by zoning regulations, Little Free Libraries have an impressive record of besting the rules imposed on them. As the country slowly rethinks the wisdom of laws restricting density and commercial activity in staid residential neighborhoods, Little Free Libraries may be leading the way.

== Little Free Pantries and Blessing Boxes ==
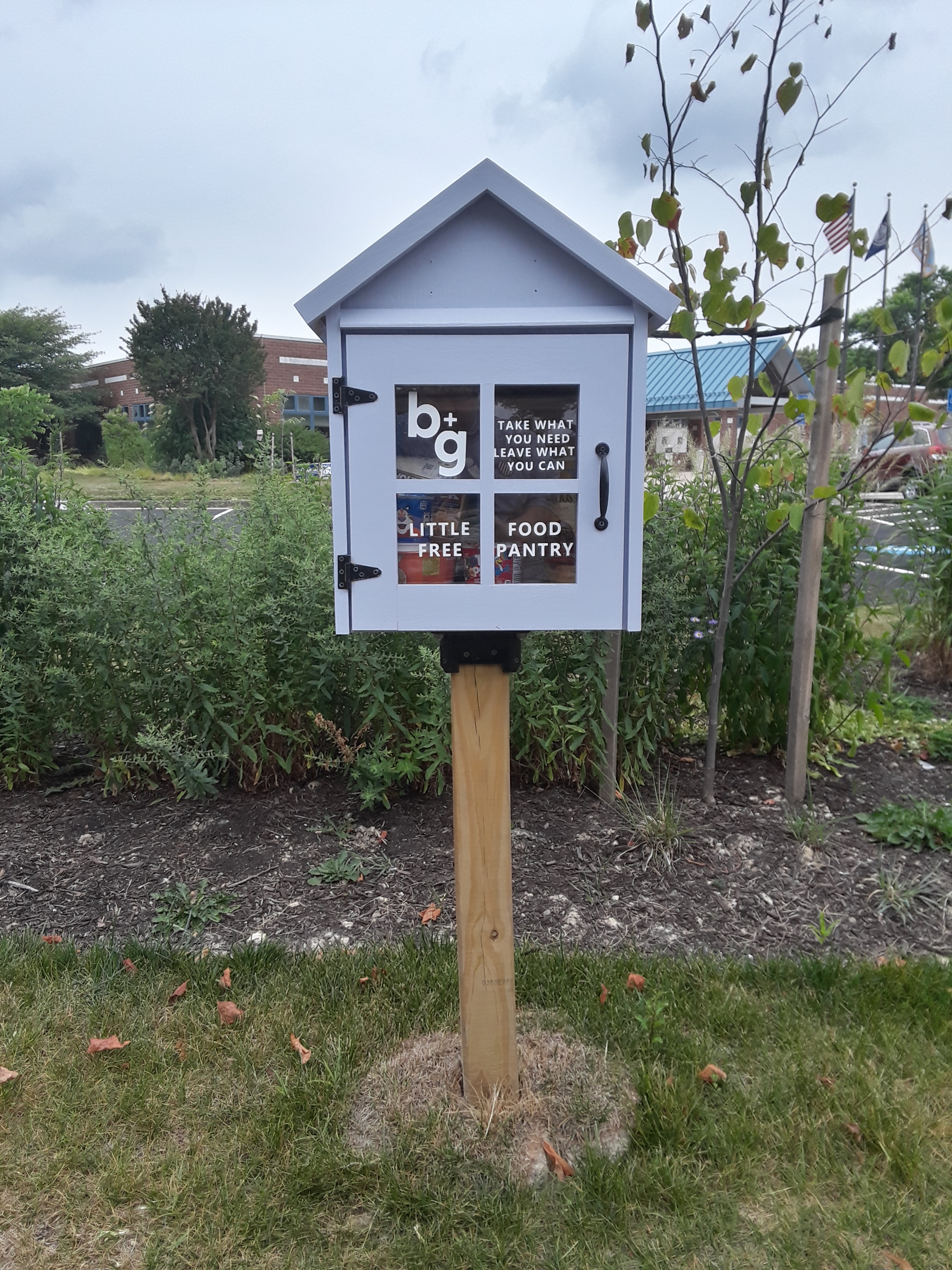
A Little Free Food Pantry in Fairfax County, Virginia, seen in June 2023

As of June 2019, the United States had more than 600 Little Free Pantries, and more can be found in Canada, The Netherlands and Australia. The Little Pantries function similarly to the libraries, as places where anyone can bring food and anyone can take food. Personal hygiene items such as soap and toothbrushes are also distributed. The first Little Free Pantry opened May 12, 2016 in Fayetteville, Arkansas. Another 100 were installed within months, including pantries in New Zealand. Items not allowed, according to informal rules, include razors, alcohol, and breakable glass containers.

Blessing Boxes, which are similar to the Little Free Pantries, are often sponsored by churches. With most Blessing boxes featuring the message, “Take what you need; leave what you can.” They provide a place for sharing food and other useful goods, such as clothing. People are encouraged to "pay it forward" and donate whatever they can, such as a can of beans. "The idea is that anyone walking by who may be struggling can use the goods to make ends meet and get through the day."

== Programs ==
The Little Free Library operates an Indigenous Library Program, which provides book-sharing boxes for installation on tribal lands, as well as in other Indigenous communities in the U.S. and Canada. Starter LFL boxes come with two starter sets of books; one set of 25 books written and/or illustrated by BIPOC authors and artists, and the other set of 25 books with content centering Indigenous people and communities. The organization also runs a Banned Books program, which distributes books that have been challenged or banned to box stewards, and an Impact Library Program, which distributes LFL boxes in communities with limited access to books.

== See also ==
- Community fridge
- Free Blockbuster
- Library of things – Collection of objects for loan
- Public bookcase – for history and generic aspects of the practice
- Bookleggers Library
