= Last Blockbuster =

Final Blockbuster store in the world

Blockbuster
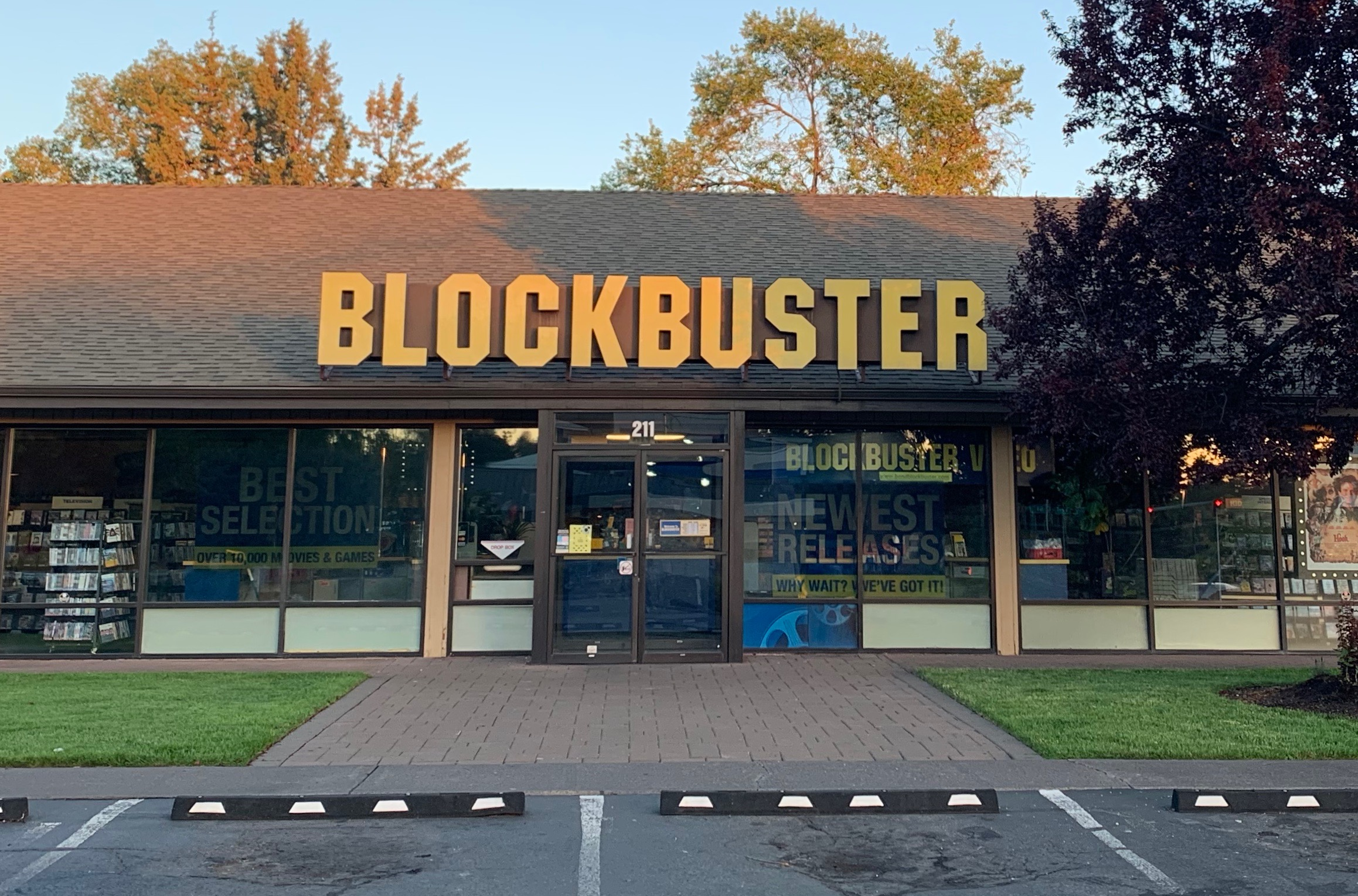
- The storefront in 2022
- Alternative names: The Last Blockbuster

General information
- Location: 211 NE Revere Avenue, Bend, Oregon
- Coordinates: 44°4′2″N 121°18′13″W
- Opened: 1992; 34 years ago (as Pacific Video); 2000; 26 years ago (converted into Blockbuster franchise)
- Owner: Ken Tisher

Design and construction
- Known for: Last remaining Blockbuster retail store

Website
- bendblockbuster.com

Blockbuster, colloquially known as the Last Blockbuster, is a video rental store in Bend, Oregon, United States. In 2018, it became the last Blockbuster store in the United States. In 2019, it became the last remaining retail store in the world using the Blockbuster brand, albeit being an independently-owned franchise.

== History ==
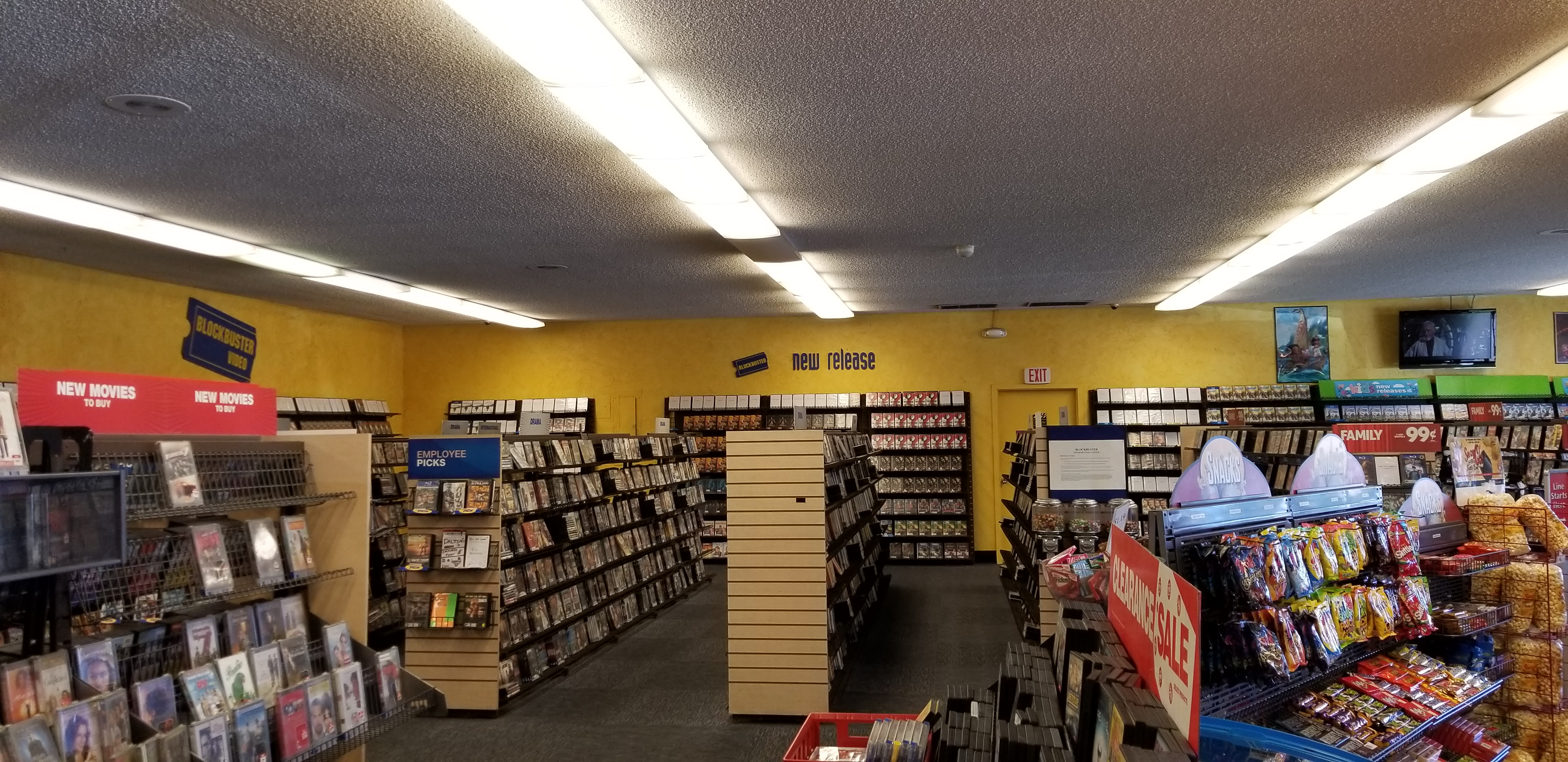
Interior, 2018

Located at the intersection of U.S. Route 20 and Revere Avenue, the Blockbuster in Bend, Oregon, was opened by Ken and Debbie Tisher in 1992 as the second location of Pacific Video, a small video rental store chain in the state. They previously attempted to negotiate a location by a Shopko near U.S. Route 97. In an interview with The Bulletin regarding his first store, Tisher stated that he wanted to approach the video business as a "mom-and-pop store". In 2000, Tisher converted it into a Blockbuster franchise store. Sandi Harding has been the general manager since 2004.

Blockbuster LLC closed all of its corporate-owned stores by early 2014, leaving the Bend location as one of 50 remaining franchise stores. With these closures, David Carrera and a few other ex-Blockbuster employees gathered at Carrera's Plano home to develop a system so that Carrera could support the IT of the remaining franchisees remotely, eventually establishing the Carrera Company to exclusively do so. In July 2018, it became the last remaining Blockbuster in the United States, and in March 2019, the last in the world. Dish Network, the owner of the Blockbuster trademark, no longer grants new franchises with the Blockbuster name, which has cemented the Bend store's status as the last Blockbuster.

The location has become a popular tourist destination since becoming the last Blockbuster. Ken Tisher, who still owns the store, continues to license the Blockbuster trademark from Dish Network on a yearly basis, which also allows the location to sell merchandise using the name. The store stocks around 1,200 titles and has an estimated 4,000 members who regularly rent movies.

In 2018, 10 Barrel, a local brewery, released a dark ale celebrating the store, named The Last Blockbuster (with flavor hints of red licorice); it was released at a block party celebrating the store (when it had become the last in the U.S.). The Ellen DeGeneres Show visited the store for a prank hidden camera segment in May 2019 (when it had become the last Blockbuster in the world). The store is the subject of the 2020 documentary film The Last Blockbuster, created by Bend filmmakers and featuring various celebrities, such as Kevin Smith, Brian Posehn, and Ione Skye; which was released on DVD and VHS and made available for streaming on Netflix.

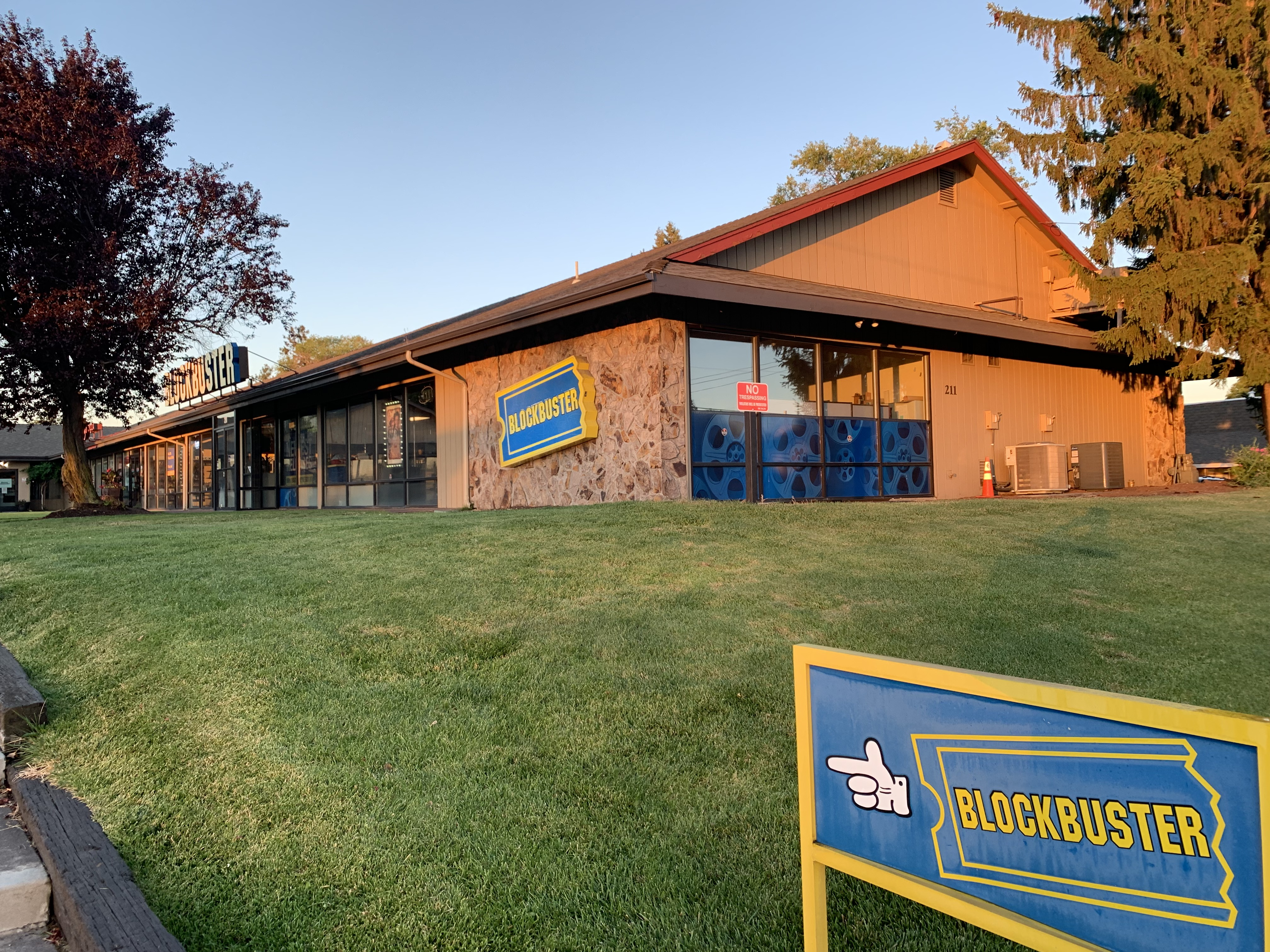
Storefront and lawn, 2022

The store continued to operate without laying off staff during the COVID-19 pandemic. It hosted sleepovers via Airbnb in September 2020, limited to residents of Deschutes County and four people from the same household.

The store was featured as a central plot point in the second episode of the 21st season of Family Guy, titled "Bend or Blockbuster". The Netflix sitcom Blockbuster (2022), starring Randall Park and Melissa Fumero, is based on a fictionalized version of the last-remaining Blockbuster.

In 2023, the store released a commercial on Instagram which first ran at the same time as the Super Bowl LVII halftime show. The ad features a lone cockroach journeying across the aftermath of an apparent global catastrophe until it arrives at the last Blockbuster, which is still open. The store saw an uptick in sales following the ad's release.

In 2024, it was estimated that about 80% of the store's income comes from selling merchandise. Because the majority of the DVD vendors that provided them with movies are now closed, and the remaining ones have minimum orders that are far too large for a single store, all new movies come from Walmart and Target, while the snacks and candy are bought from Costco.

== Memorabilia ==
The store displays several pieces of film memorabilia that formerly belonged to actor Russell Crowe, including his hood from Robin Hood (2010), his robe and shorts from Cinderella Man (2005), his vest from Les Misérables (2012), and director's chairs from American Gangster (2007). The pieces were given to the store by the last operating Alaskan Blockbuster in Anchorage following its closure in July 2018. The items were originally donated to the Alaska store for an April 2018 segment of Last Week Tonight with John Oliver.

== See also ==
- Cinephilia
- Family Video
- Free Blockbuster
