= The Love Fridge Chicago =

Mutual aid project

- Formation: July 2020
- Founders: Eric Von Haynes, James Wurm, Lisa Armstrong, Ramon "Radius" Norwood, Ashley "Ash" Godfrey, Eric Hotchkiss, Risa Haynes, Velma Smith
- Type: Mutual Aid Organization
- Headquarters: Chicago, Illinois
- Website: https://www.thelovefridge.com/

The Love Fridge Chicago, located in Chicago, Illinois is a mutual aid group addressing food waste and food insecurity by providing community fridges. The Love Fridge was started by numerous co-founders in July 2020 after seeing similar efforts in New York during the COVID-19 pandemic and completely operates on volunteer work and donations from local community residents.

The Love Fridge Chicago places refrigerators in accessible locations throughout the Chicago metropolitan area. Often these public refrigerators are located in front of stores and public spaces.

The Love, Fridge Chicago also partners with local Chicago restaurants, farmers, grocers, businesses, and community members to provide food. Besides food, these fridges are occasionally stocked with other necessities, such as hygiene products, clothing, and other essential items by partnering organizations. As of March 2023, there are 23 refrigerators in the Chicago metropolitan area.

== Art and Decorations ==
Each fridge is painted by local artists to make them more inviting. The goal of the painted art on each fridge placed is to help eliminate the social stigma surrounding food insecurity. Each of the different art designs depicts ideas about maintaining "good health" for the surrounding residents through different cultural perspectives. This allows residents to talk about their neighborhoods and personal experiences with food to keep residents together as a connected community.

== Origins ==
The Love Fridge Chicago was co-founded by Chicago native, Eric Von Haynes, Ramon “Radius” Norwood, Eric Hotchkiss, James Wurm, Ashley "Ash" Godfrey, Velma Smith, Risa Haynes, and Lisa Armstrong. The Love Fridge originated in Chicago, Illinois during the COVID-19 pandemic. In 2020, numerous problems arose throughout the world as a "new normal" took hold. In Chicago, issues regarding food insecurity began to occur, especially in South and West side neighborhoods. Residents found themselves lacking in healthy food options in their neighborhoods. In response, Norwood along with a team of fifteen others took inspiration from similar projects located in New York City. Community members are encouraged to take any products they need from the fridges. In turn, community members are encouraged to donate to the fridges if they can.

== Locations ==
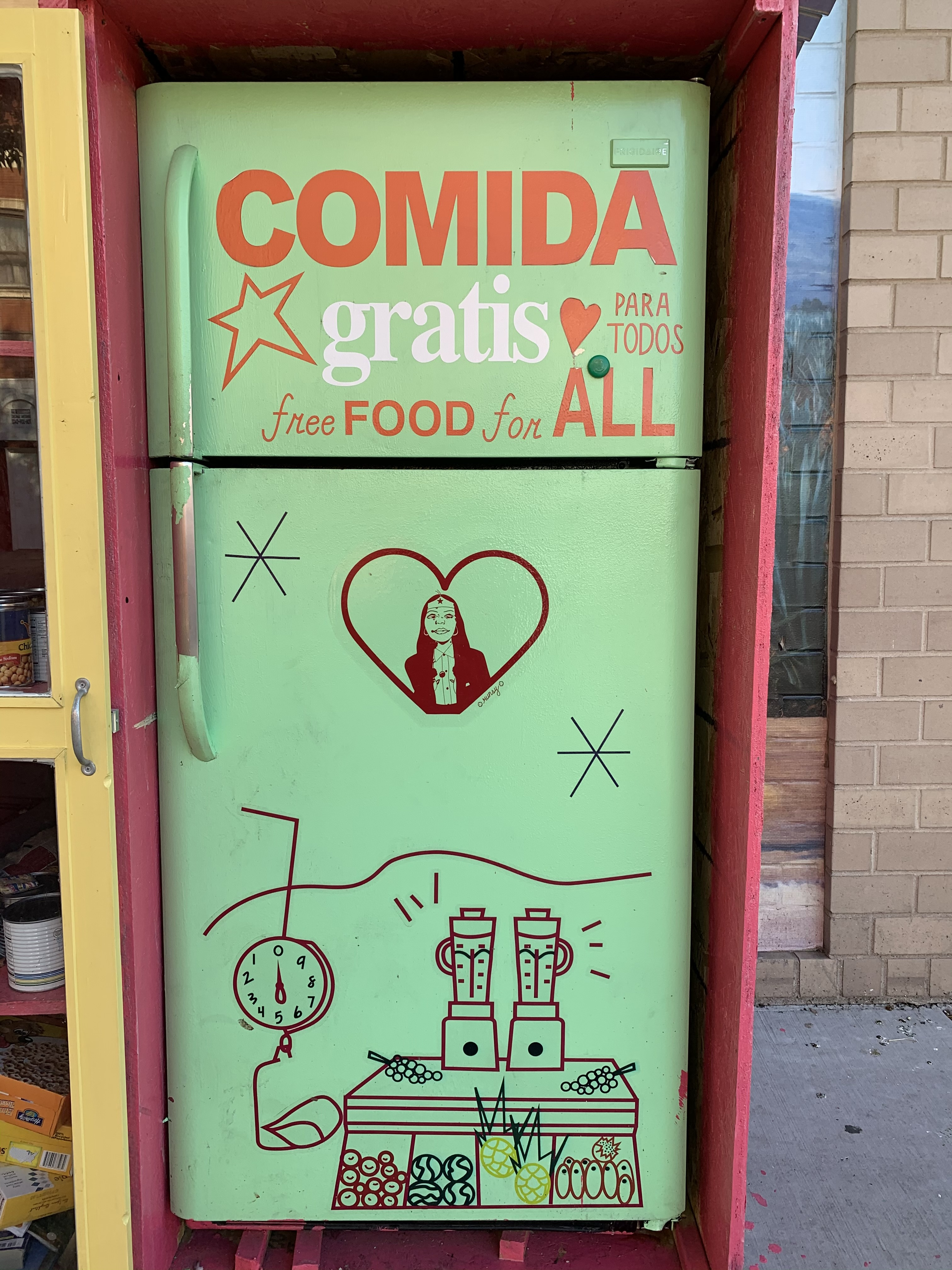
Love Fridge at Moreno's Liquors in the Little Village neighborhood of Chicago, Illinois

As of March 2023, The Love Fridge has installed 23 fridges in the Chicagoland area. Refrigerators are located in 17 different Chicago neighborhoods. 22 out of the 23 fridges are available for access 24/7. There are locations in Back of the Yards, Bridgeport, Bronzeville, East Side, Englewood, Grand Boulevard, Hermosa, Humboldt Park, Hyde Park, McKinley Park, Little Village, North Lawndale, Pilsen, Rogers Park, South Loop, South Shore, West Lawn, and West Ridge.

== Contributors ==
To be able to host a fridge, you must own a fridge, own property to place a fridge, and have electricity for the fridge to be running. If all of these components are obtained, an interested party may contact The Love Fridge, Chicago directly to start the process of hosting a fridge. Not all fridges are in collaboration with just one business or organization, some fridges are in partnership with several organizations & companies that can also provide a fridge and or power to it. When maintaining the fridges, community members and other volunteers will act as fridge managers, which entails conducting daily fridge evaluations to make sure the refrigerators are stocked and running smoothly.

=== Donation Guidelines ===
The Love Fridge has food donation guidelines, allowing sealed packages of fruit, vegetables, and dairy products like cheese or milk, pastries, bread, and fresh eggs that have a visible expiration date. The Love Fridge does not accept donations of alcoholic beverages, raw meat, raw fish, or foods that do not have a visible expiration date.

=== Current Fridge Hosts ===
Currently, there are 16 fridges located throughout the Chicago metropolitan area.

List of current fridges with The Love Fridge, Chicago:

- The Plant
- Breathing Room
- Star Farm
- Port Ministries
- Getting Grown Collective
- Fix Your Plate at Boxville
- Augustana Lutheran Church
- Rodfei Zedek
- Patchwork Farms
- The Love Shack
- Stone Temple
- Elpeeda at Honeybear Cafe
- New Bethel
- A House in Austin
- South Shore Fridge
