= Trinket trade box =

Public box for trading objects

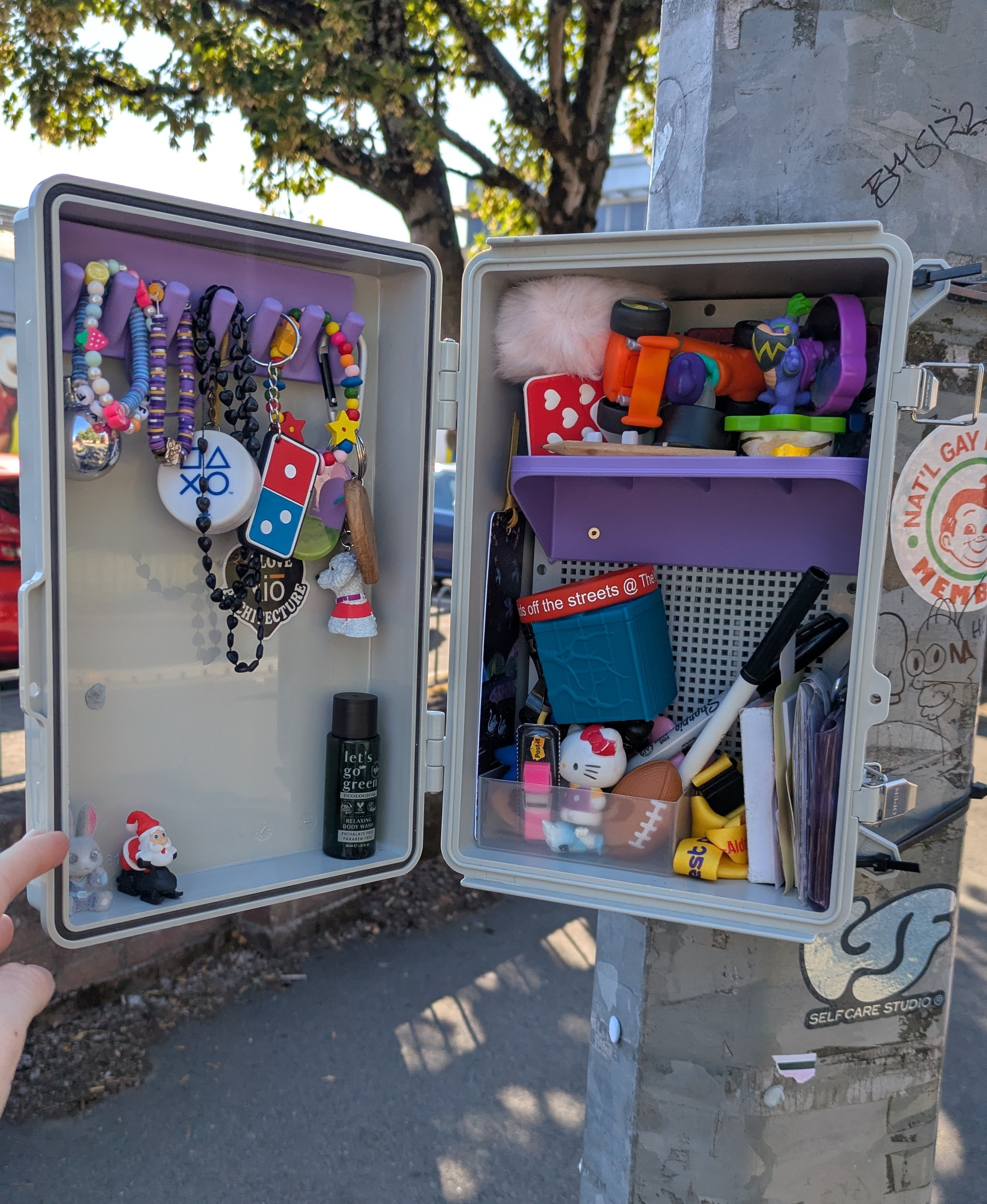
A trinket trade box located in Cardiff

Trinket Trade Boxes are waterproof containers, filled with toys, keychains, stickers and other small objects that are intended to be traded. The boxes gained popularity in 2025, with videos of trinket trades being shared across social media platforms.

== History ==
In January 2023, Project Sidewalk Joy began tracking sidewalk installations that were becoming popular in Portland, Oregon. In September 2024 they launched the Worldwide Joy Map, allowing people to share boxes across the globe. In September 2025 the Philly Trinket Trove in Philadelphia was created using a junction box. Project Sidewalk Joy credited the Philly Trinket Trove for popularising trinket trade boxes, as people found it easier to create the installations out of Junction boxes rather than building them out of wood.

Creators of Trinket Trade Boxes have said they've been inspired by public bookcases and many have compared the trend to geocaching. Creators of the boxes often cite TikTok for influencing them to start their own Trinket Trade Box. Box creators sometimes make their own dedicated social media accounts for their boxes and encourage visitors to share their own videos of the boxes. The trend has been credited as being a way to bring communities together, without people having to spend money.

Visitors are encouraged to trade items, running on a one in, one out model. However, some boxes have experienced an overflow of items, with owners asking people to take extras. The Trade Boxes are often installed without permission, being attached to lampposts or fences. However some boxes are installed inside shops, or installed outside shops with the owners' permission.

Some Trinket Trade Boxes have faced vandalism, with items being stolen or replaced with garbage. One Nottinghamshire box was cut from its railings and stolen only two weeks after it was installed. This has caused some people to relocate boxes, reinstalling them inside shops to prevent further vandalism. Some owners have resorted to installing combination locks, or security cameras. Some box owners have also faced criticism after posting videos complaining about the quality of trinkets left in the Trade Boxes. This has caused controversy over what is considered a trinket and worthy of trading.
