= Public bookcase =

Publicly available bookshelf serving as an informal free library

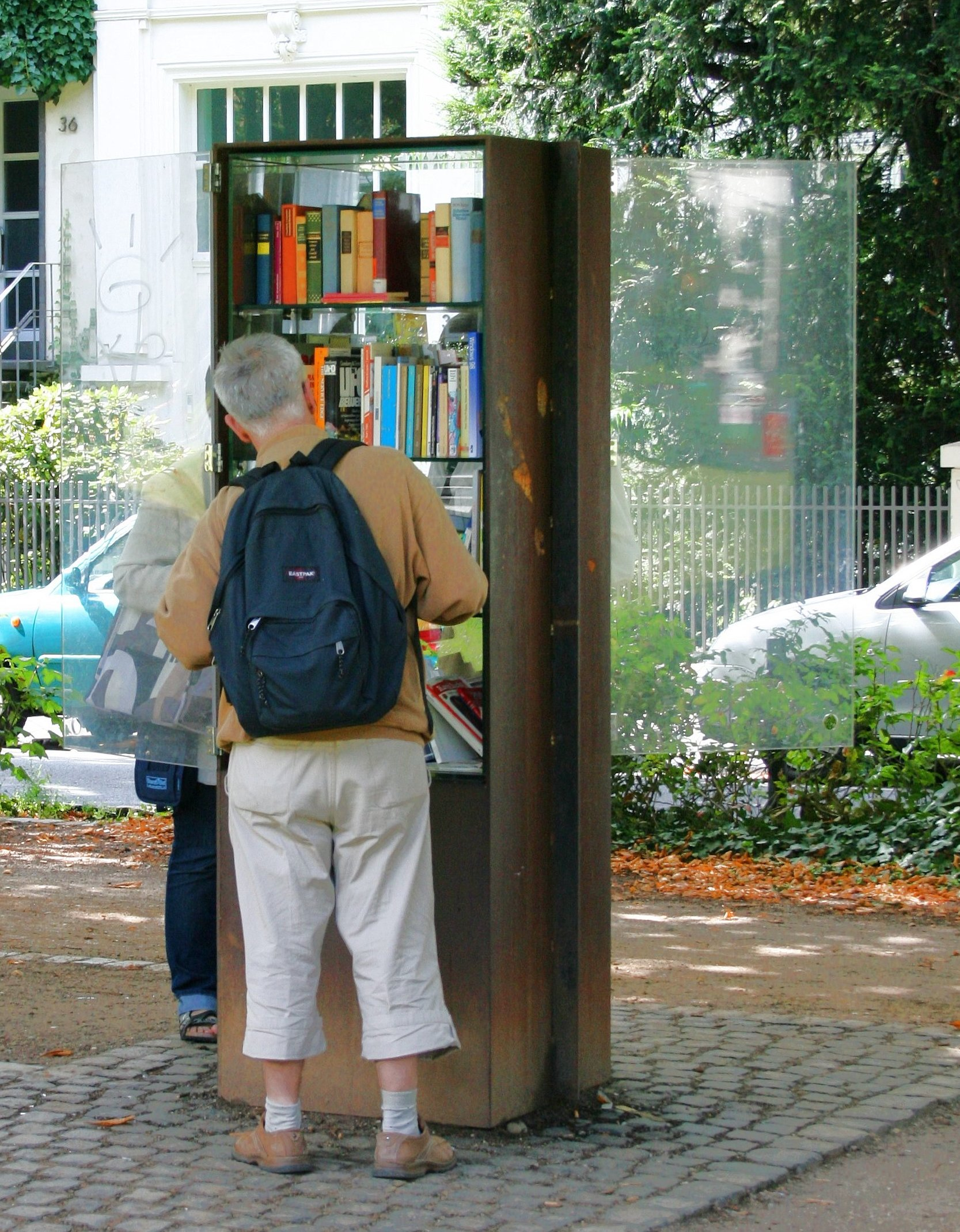
Public bookcase in use, Bonn, Germany (2008)

A public bookcase (also known as a free library or book swap or street library or sidewalk library) is a cabinet which may be freely and anonymously used for the exchange and storage of books without the administrative rigor associated with formal libraries. When in public places these cabinets are of a robust and weatherproof design which are available at all times. However, cabinets installed in public or commercial buildings may be simple, unmodified book-shelves and may only be available during certain periods.

== Origin ==
Closely allied with the BookCrossing concept, the original public bookcases were conceived as artistic acts. Very early examples are the creations of performance artist duo Clegg & Guttmann in 1991. Collections of bookcases were conceived as "free open-air libraries" in Darmstadt and Hannover in Germany in the late 1990s.

In 2002, the Bonn Community Foundation awarded Trixy Royeck funding for her idea "outdoor books – books in the open" which she submitted while studying interior design in Mainz and since this time the concept has been widely replicated. A public bookcase opened in 2010 in Vienna, Austria. In Basel, Switzerland, where many coffee shops and other venues host open bookshelves, a public bookcase was unveiled in June 2011.

Open bookcases are financed by a wide range of organisations (individuals, foundations, Lions Clubs, civic associations, and so on). Visitors to the bookcases decide which books to deposit and borrow, and whether to return or exchange borrowed books for others.

== Use and acceptance ==
If a public bookcase is centrally and accessibly located and is stocked with sufficient material, public bookcases are quickly and widely appreciated. Vandalism has occurred in some places and, in successful cases, is countered by "bookcase sponsors" who devote their time and attention to care of the collection.

The acceptance, motivation and user-profile of public bookshelves was examined in 2008 by a study at the University of Bonn. It was found that the system had developed as a notable alternative to conventional bookstores. Surveyed users also indicated that they believed that regular use of public bookcases could function as an example for similar schemes for other desirable goods. This acceptance has led to a rapid dissemination of public bookshelves throughout Germany. It has been found that durable construction and storm-resistance promote sustained use. As of December 2023, there are 3400 such libraries in Germany.

== Variants ==
In Oerlinghausen there is a modified version of the public bookcase. A small bookcase has been installed in Simon Square by the Friends of The Public Library, in collaboration with the Cohabitation/Society/Culture group of the local Agenda 21. These groups stock the bookcase as needed from a so-called "book exchange", a larger public event which has taken place in the Dietrich-Bonhoeffer-Haus in Oerlingsausen-South every Saturday since 2007. One may also deposit book requests to be matched from stock by the operators of the exchange.

The Salbke Bookmark is a large, open-air construction which includes a number of public bookcases. Originally built on the site of a demolished library in a depopulated district of Magdeburg, the local civic association has moved much of the stock to a nearby vacant shop where more than 10000 donations are securely housed.

A cafe in Marburg includes a public bookcase. The city library now includes a cabinet of books which may be freely taken or exchanged by patrons rather than organising complex book disposal events. The operation of this variant combines the library's daily operations with community control. As the bookcase is located in a protected space it does not require sponsorship or weather protection.

In New Zealand, several cities have installed "Lilliput Libraries" (after the diminutive fictional island in Gulliver's Travels) consisting of repurposed cupboards or cabinets outside private houses, which are essentially identical to public bookcases. The Lilliput Library scheme began in Dunedin in 2015, and has since spread to over 300 Lilliput Libraries in around 40 towns and cities around the country, as well as to Queensland, Australia.

== Registries and mapping ==
In North America small enclosed bookcases, usually in front of residences, have become a common sight in many cities. Some of these are purchased from or otherwise officially registered with Little Free Library, which was founded in 2009. In Australia, Street Library Australia operates along similar lines, while in Europe many public bookcases are registered via the Open Book Case project. The mapping project OpenStreetMap has a designated tag for registering the location types and more of public bookcases.

== Gallery ==
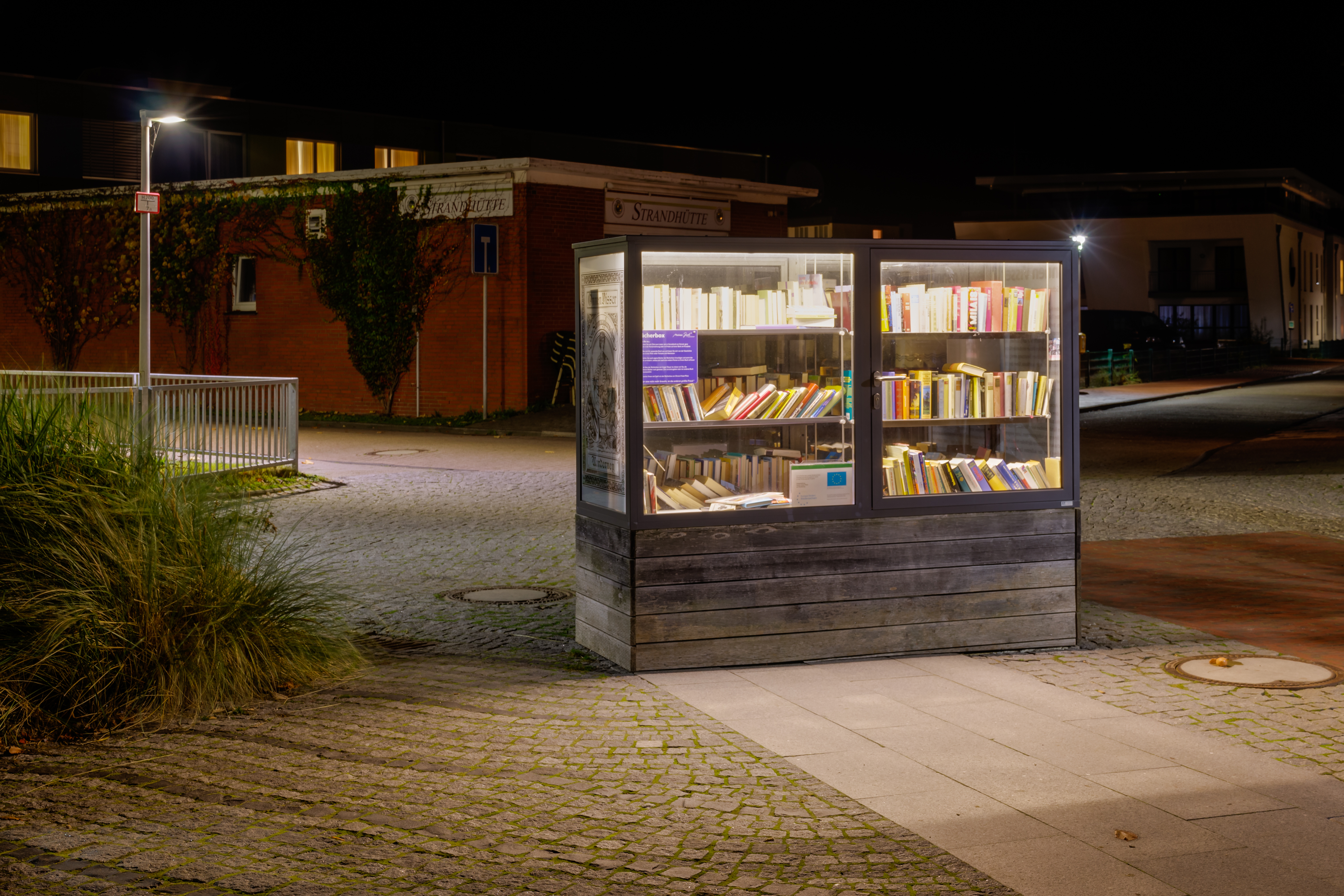
Bookcase at Onnen-Visser-Platz, Norderney, Lower Saxony, Germany

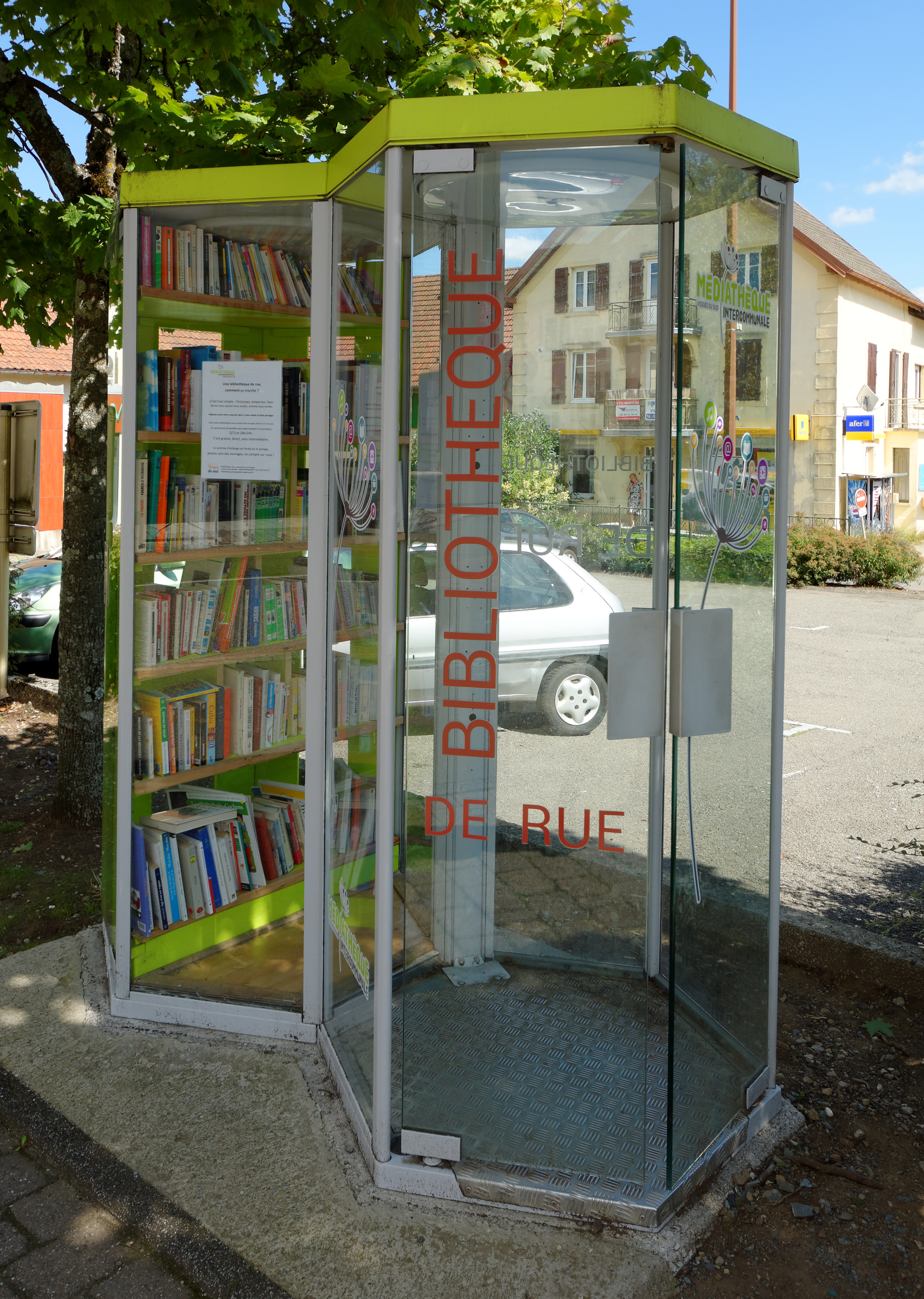
Street library, made with a telephone booth, in Giromagny, France

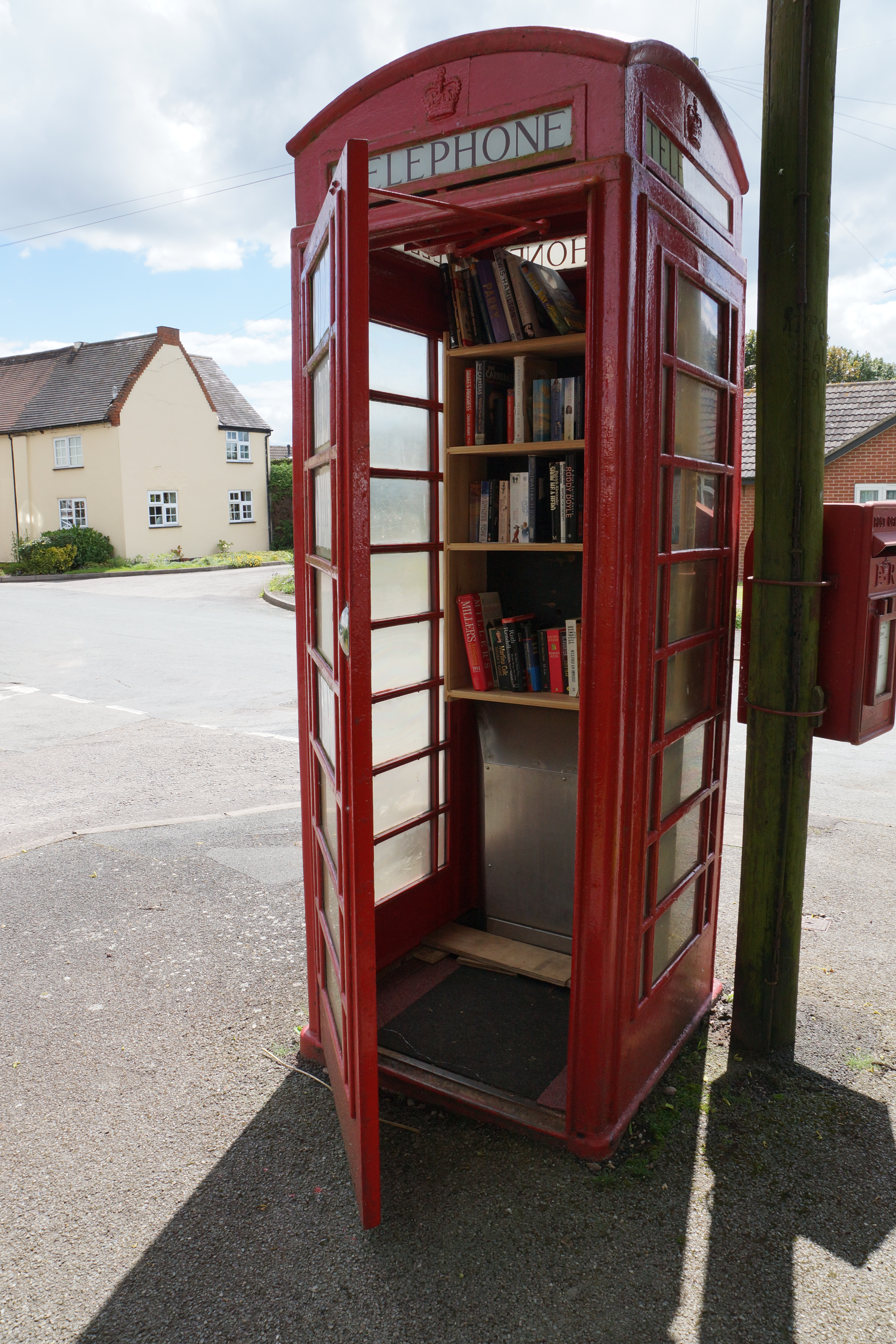
Red phone box now used as a book swap in Wall, Staffordshire, England

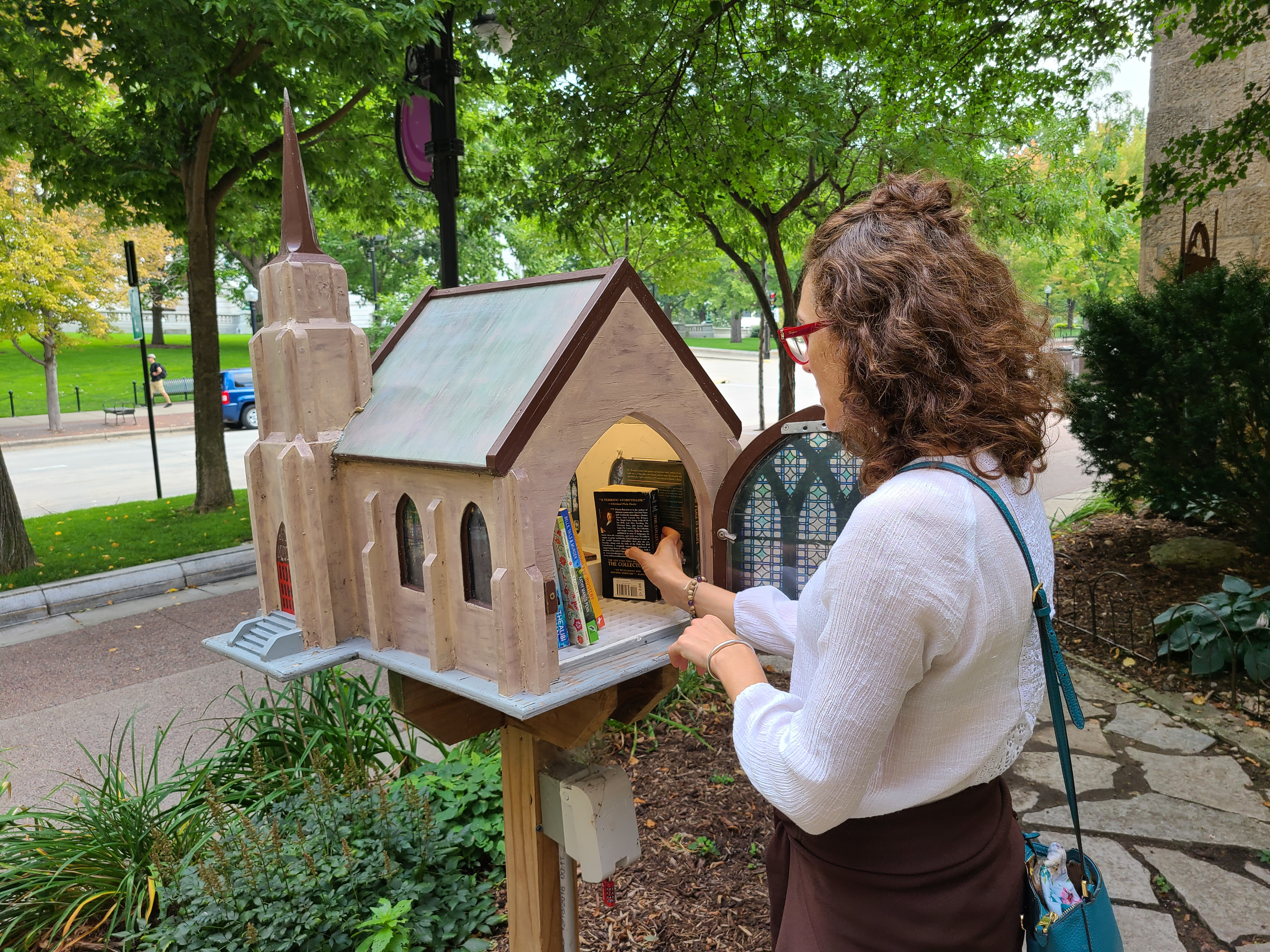
Public Bookcase outside of Grace Episcopal Church (Madison, Wisconsin)

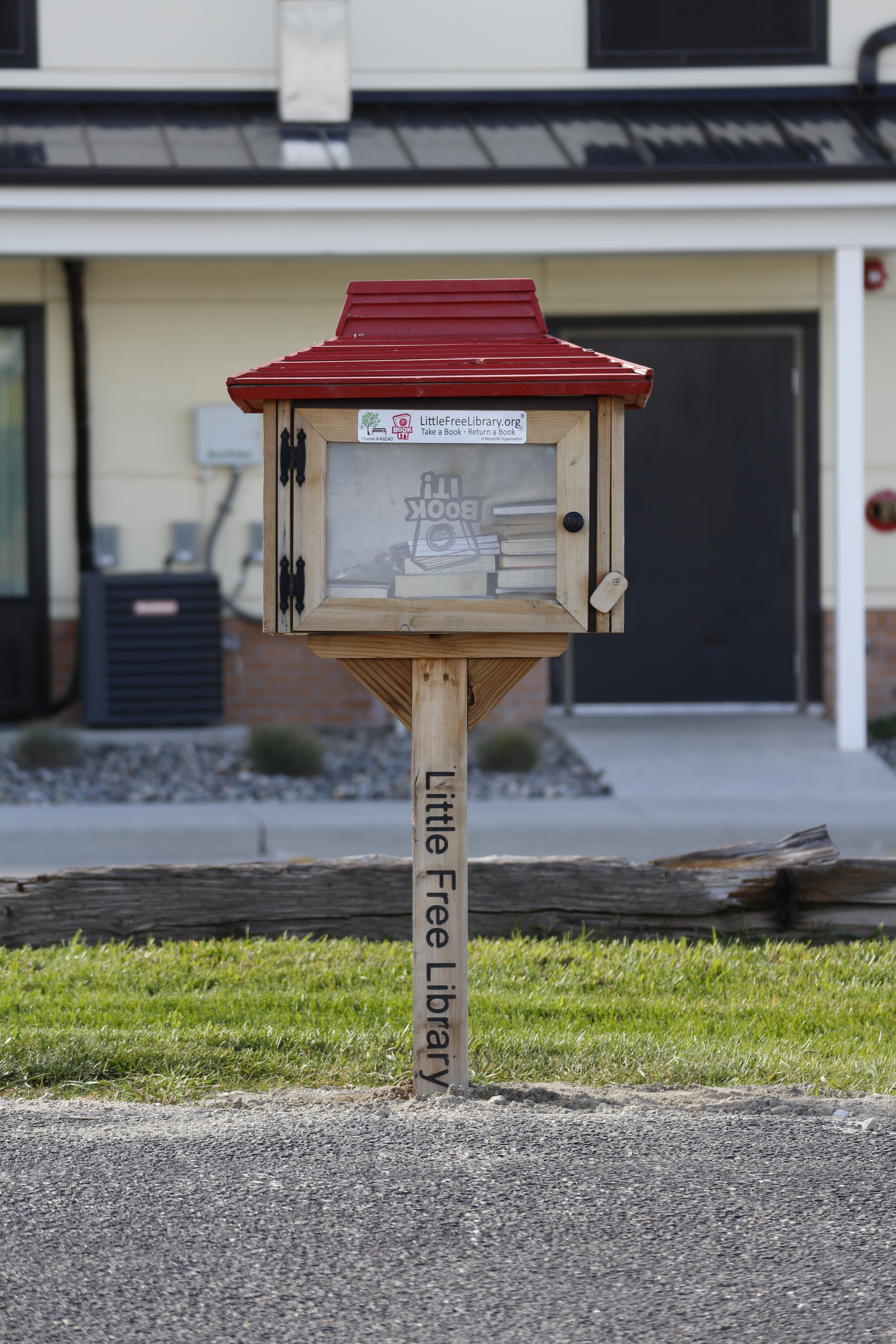
A Pizza Hut–themed Little Free Library in Gillette, Wyoming

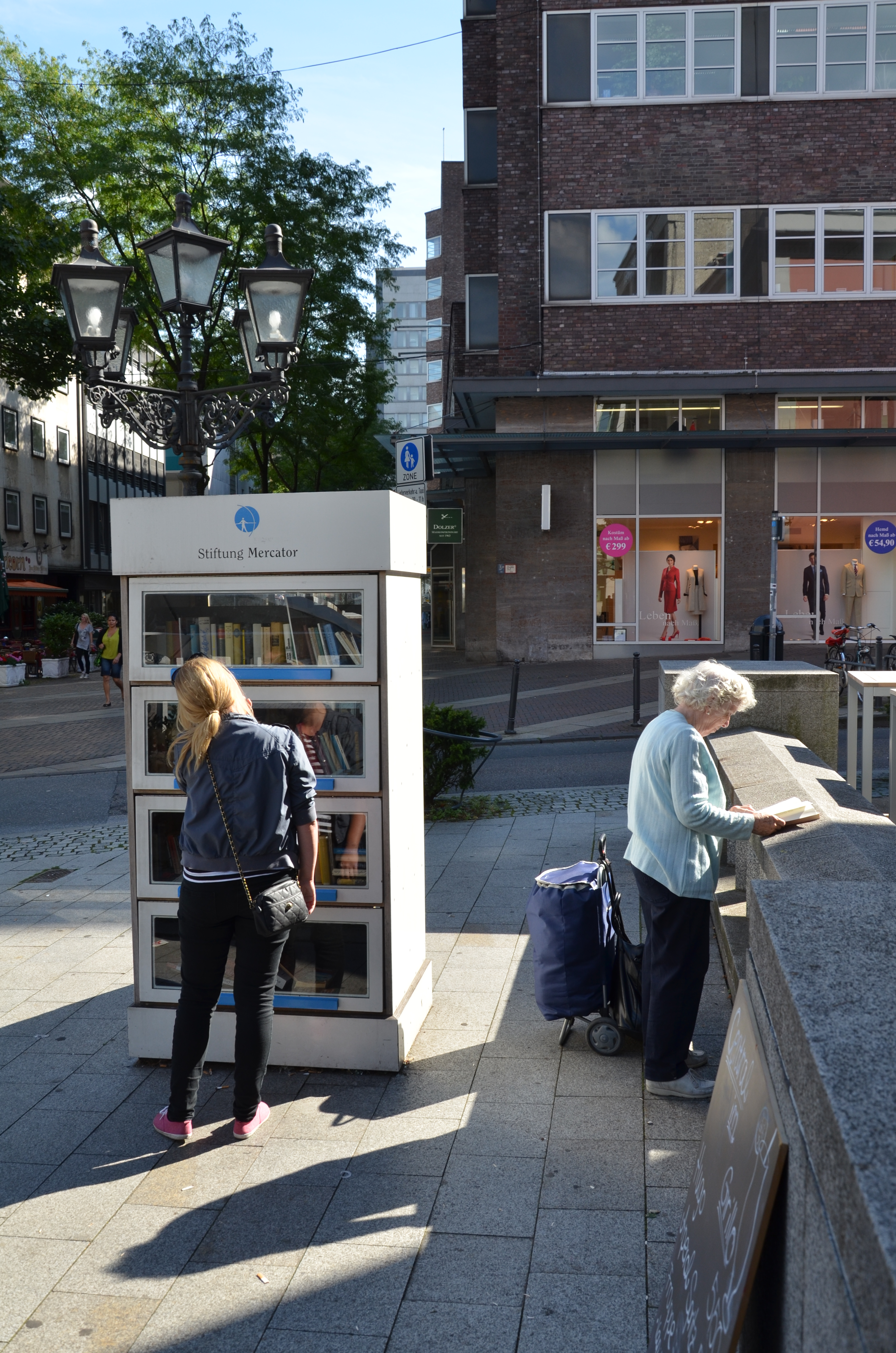
Browsing a public bookcase in Essen, Germany

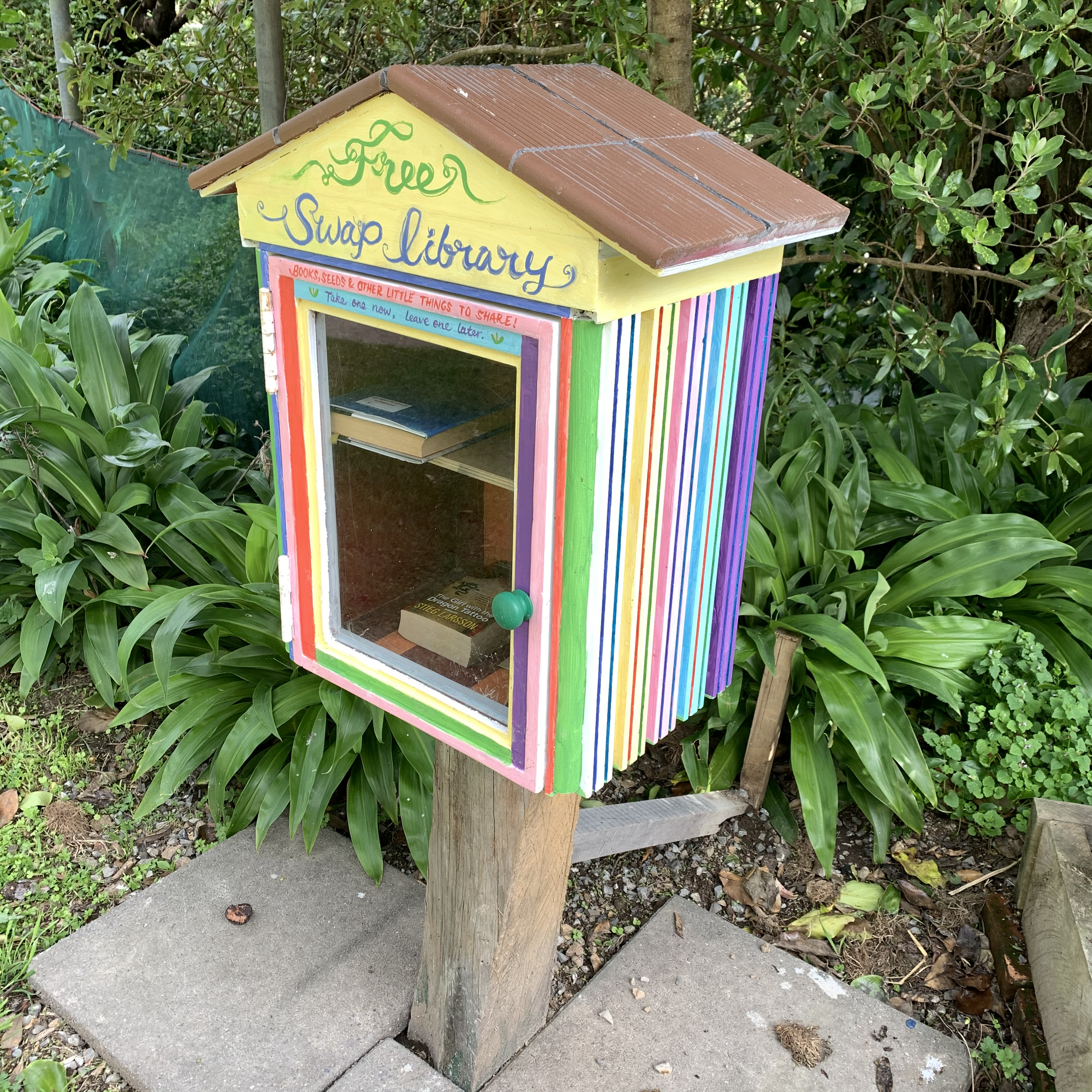
"Free Swap Lilliput Library" bookcase in Wellington, New Zealand

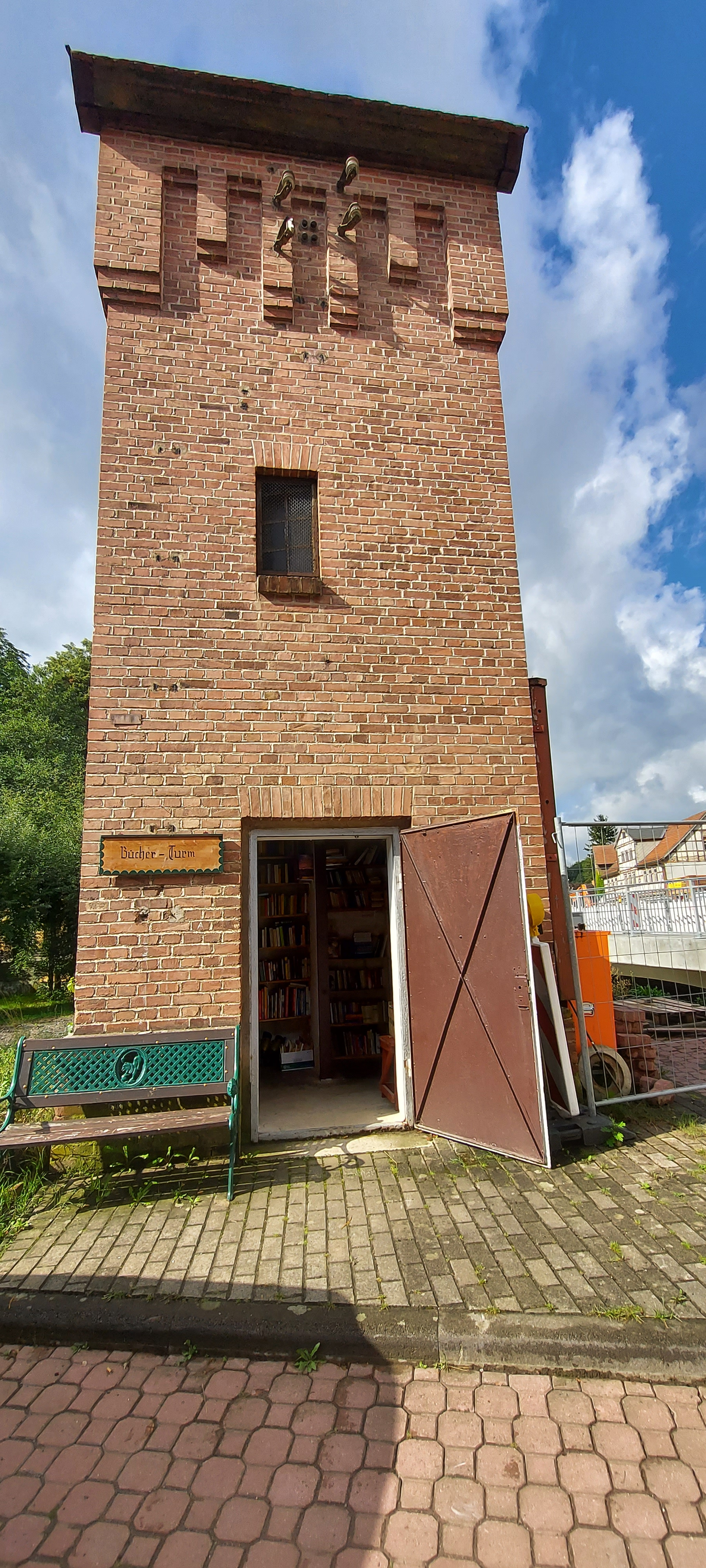
"Book Tower" in Wippra, Germany

== See also ==
- Book sales club
- Book swapping
- Bookleggers Library
- Community fridge
- Give-away shop
- Little Free Libraries
- Trinket Trade Box
