= Community fridge =

Refrigerator located in a public space

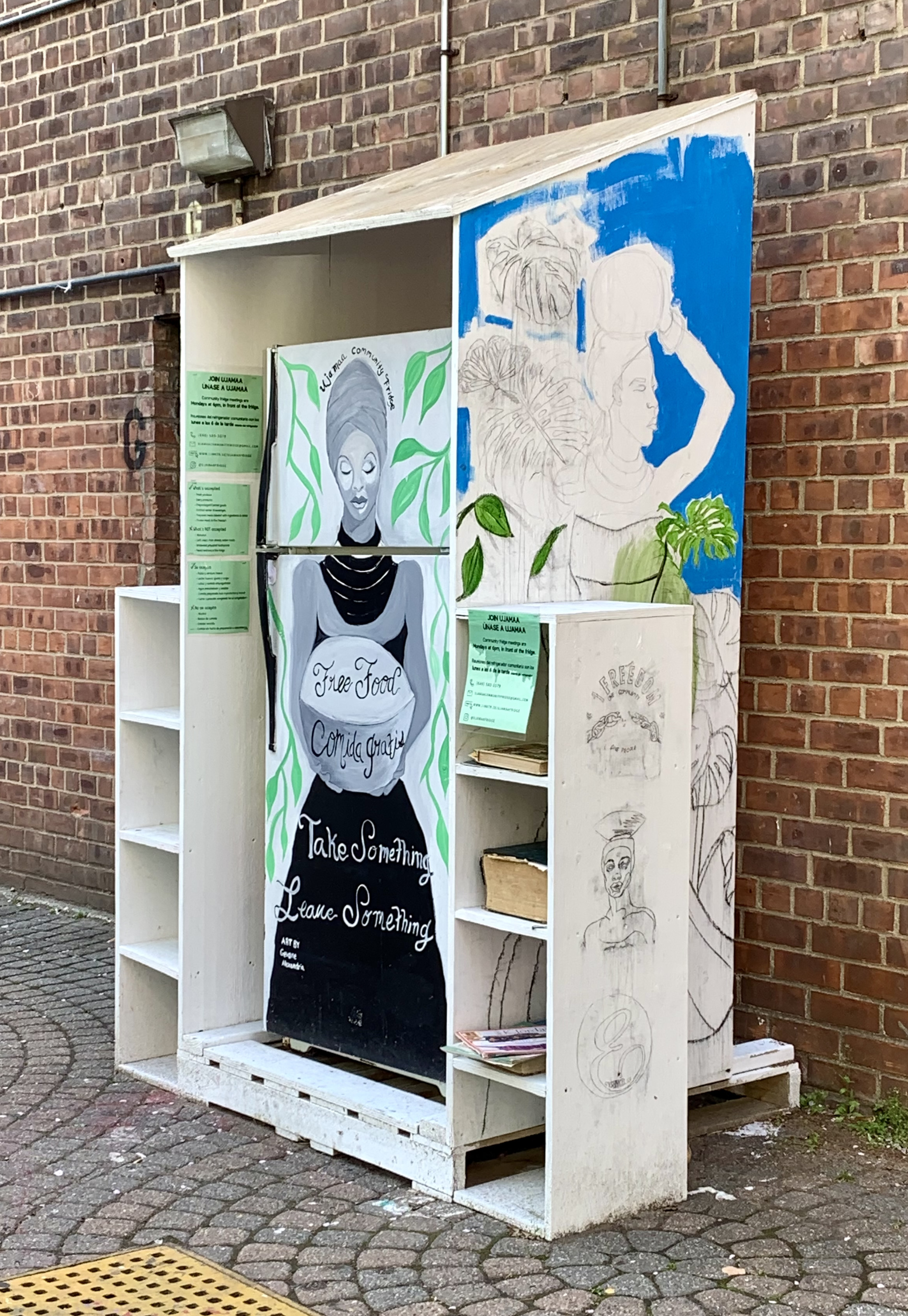
Community fridge and public bookcase in New York City

A community fridge is a refrigerator (colloquially "fridge") located in a public space. Sometimes called freedges, they are a type of mutual aid project that enables food to be shared within a community. Some community fridges also have an associated area for non-perishable food. Unlike traditional food pantries, these grassroots projects encourage anyone to put food in and take food out without limit, helping to remove the stigma from its use. The fridges take a decentralized approach, often being maintained by a network of volunteers, community members, local businesses, and larger organizations. Food in community fridges is primarily donated by individuals or food rescue organizations and can be sourced from a variety of places. Major grocers like Trader Joe's and Whole Foods donate large amounts of excess foods to food rescue organizations that then donate to these fridges. The food donated would have otherwise been thrown out.

The main aim of community fridges is to reduce food insecurity, while also mitigating food waste. They enable people facing hardship to have easy access to fresh, nutritious food. Fridges offer a wide range of food from canned goods to fresh produce to pre-cooked meals. Pre-cooked meals are required to be labeled when donated. Many fridges also accept household items, sanitary goods, and during the COVID-19 pandemic, offered masks and other PPE. Community fridges can also serve as social spaces that enable people to connect to their communities; Shelterforce magazine notes that "community fridges seem to have discovered a sweet spot in service delivery: close enough to feel the warmth of shared humanity, but far enough to avoid a sense of resentment or burden." Many fridges also painted by local artists.

== History ==
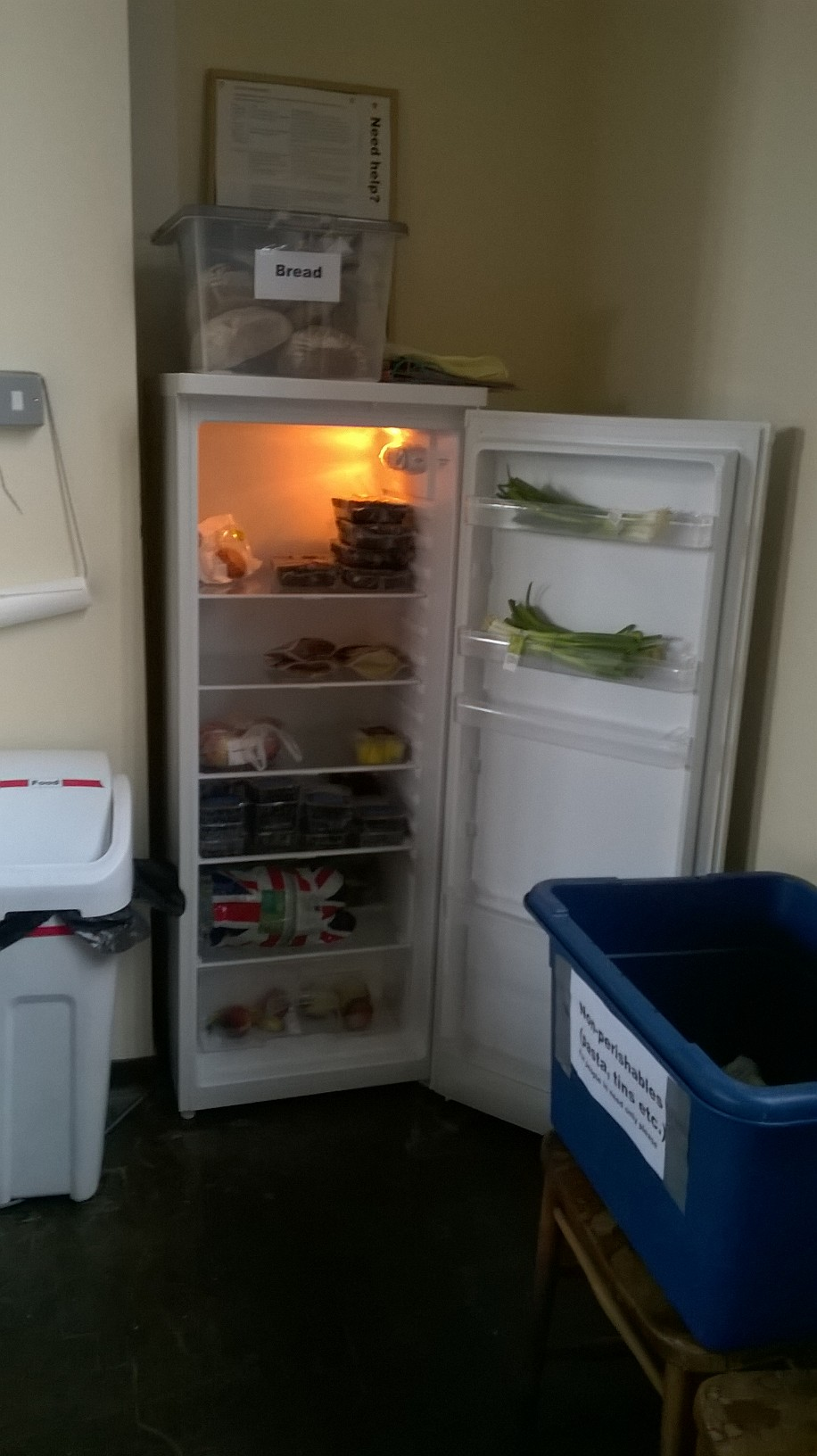
A community fridge in a church alcove in Botley (UK) with bread box on top and blue box of nonperishables on the chair

The first community fridges were set up in Germany, by a group called Foodsharing. The next community fridge was started in Spain in 2015. Community fridges draw inspiration from previous food initiatives.

In the UK, early community fridges were set up at Frome, South Derbyshire, Brixton (London), and Botley (Oxford). A national network of community fridges was set up in July 2017 by the environmental charity Hubbub UK, which offers a free support service to new projects.

By the late 2010s and early 2020s, community fridges were set up in New Zealand, India, Israel, the Netherlands, and Canada (Community Fridges Toronto had seven fridges).

=== COVID-19 pandemic ===
Community fridges have recently made a wide emergence in the U.S. during the COVID-19 pandemic. During the COVID-19 pandemic, community fridges were developed in response to a significant increase in food insecurity. In New York City, community fridges, nicknamed "Friendly Fridges", were introduced in February 2020, the first one placed by an activist group, In Our Hearts. In Our Hearts has now set up at least 14 of the 70 fridges around New York City. As of 2025, there were at least 145 free food fridges in New York City.

In Philadelphia, Dr. Michelle Nelson launched a Mama-Tee Community Fridge in North Philly, now there are 18 of them.

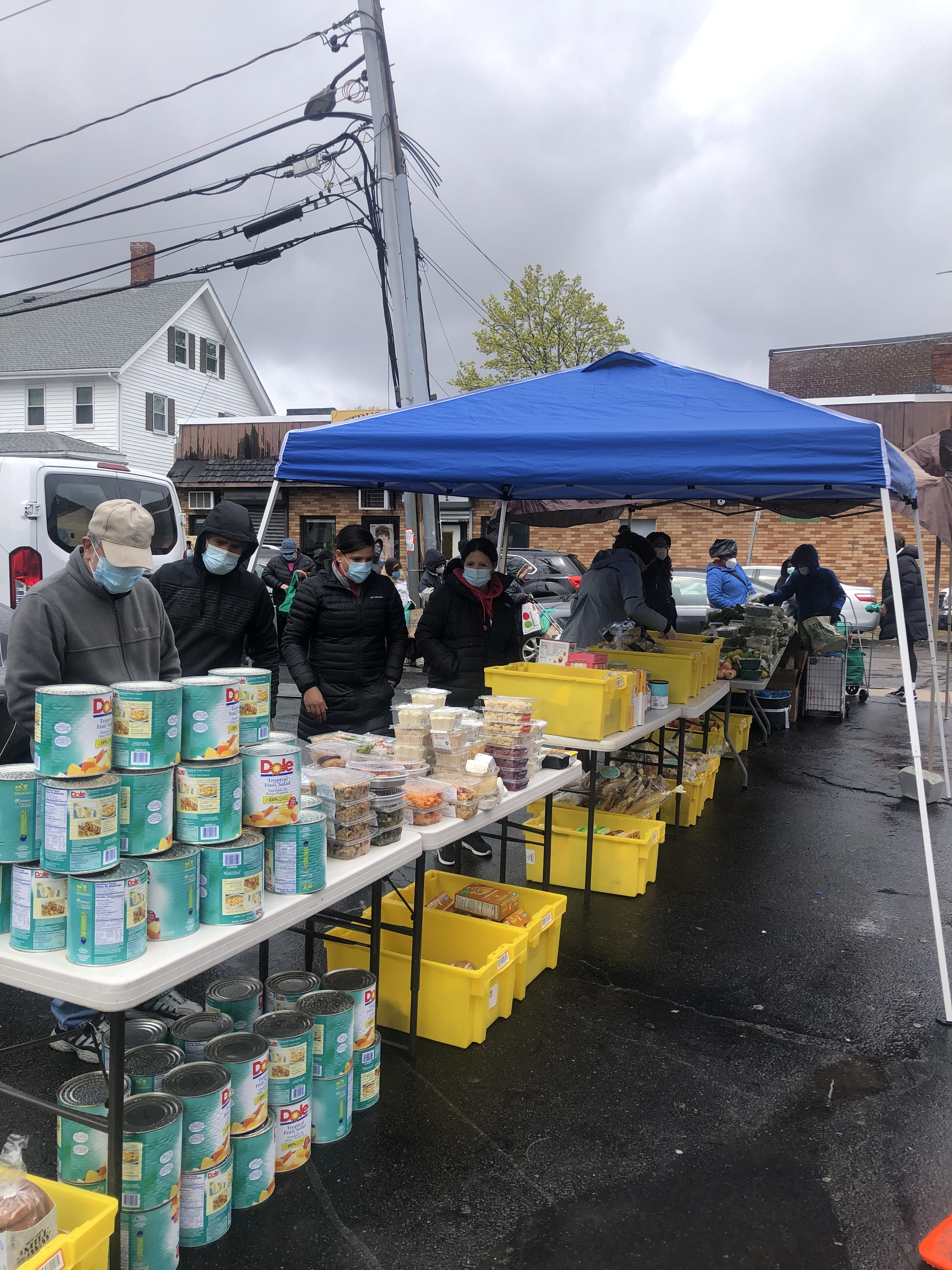
Food Drive at Boston's Dorchester Community Fridge

Using New York City as a model, community fridges have popped up in cities across the U.S. including Los Angeles, Philadelphia, Chicago, Atlanta, and more. As of September 2021, Los Angeles County has 14 community fridges. In Chicago, as of September 2021, there are 26 community fridges providing support to the community. The Love Fridge is a mutual aid network placing community refrigerators across the city. In Atlanta, Georgia, Latisha Springer, started Free99Fridge, a grassroots organization providing food to communities through their community fridge network. The organization maintains five community fridges throughout the metro Atlanta area.

In the Greater Boston Area, the first community fridge was started in Jamaica Plain in September 2020. Soon after, another fridge emerged in the neighborhood of Dorchester, Boston's largest neighborhood. As of September 2021, fridges in the neighborhoods of Allston, Fenway, Mattapan, and Roslindale have emerged, as well as in the cities of Somerville, Cambridge, Worcester.

In Thailand, entrepreneur Supakit Kulchartvijit's Pantry of Sharing pantry cabinets, a variation on the community fridges, was launched in May 2020 in Bangkok and Rayong. Thailand's SCG Foundation emulated Kulchartvijit's initiative, putting up a total 60 pantry cabinets in the country by May 25, 2020.

The following year in the Philippines as the pandemic dragged on, a trend utilizing a similar concept emerged across the country. Small carts carrying essential items were parked along sidewalks for locals to obtain any of the items without charge. The first such cart to be reported was started by the Members Church of God International on March 14, 2021.

Also in the Philippines, a similar idea under the term "community pantry" was started on Maginhawa Street in the Teacher's Village neighborhood of Quezon City on April 14, 2021. This initiative gained a wider media coverage than the MCGI initiative, resulting in the mushrooming of hundreds of similar initiatives throughout the country. In about a week after the Maginhawa pantry's launch, more than 100 pantries were set up in various locations; a week thereafter more than 300 pantries had already been set up.

Following the Maginhawa movement's example in the Philippines, various community pantries were set up in East Timor.

=== Japan ===
Japan's first full-service public refrigerator was installed at the entrance of La Campana Kisoya Building by Kisoya Co., Ltd. on June 17, 2020 (Tsurumi-ku, Yokohama City, Kanagawa Prefecture). Launched as Public Refrigerator Freego. Public refrigerators are available freely in the same way as in Europe. Installed as a countermeasure for food sharing and zero food waste. Made as one of the measures to prevent hunger. It works as a refrigerator for local use. In July 2021, it was installed at Komachi Plus Komachi Cafe, an authorized non-profit organization in Totsuka District.

=== France ===
After Marseille, Nantes and Metz 2, the first solidarity refrigerator in Paris appeared in the 18th arrondissement, on the sidewalk in front of the restaurant La Cantine, at 18 rue Ramey, at the initiative of the associations Cap ou pas cap, Le Carillon, and the owner of the restaurant Dumia Metboul, who discovered the concept in London. On December 15, 2017, Cap ou pas cap opened the solidarity refrigerator in front of the store Les Nouveaux Robinson in the 12th arrondissement. Every day it is filled with unsold merchants from this small distribution area, who also monitor its contents morning and evening, ensuring that food hygiene standards are met. Typical refrigerator temperature should be 40 degrees Fahrenheit. Every month the store sends 300 kg of unsold goods there. As of April 16, 2019, the Montreux association bar-restaurant Rêv Café has installed a cooperative refrigerator at the initiative of the Montreux association l'Esprit Léger.

=== Philippines ===
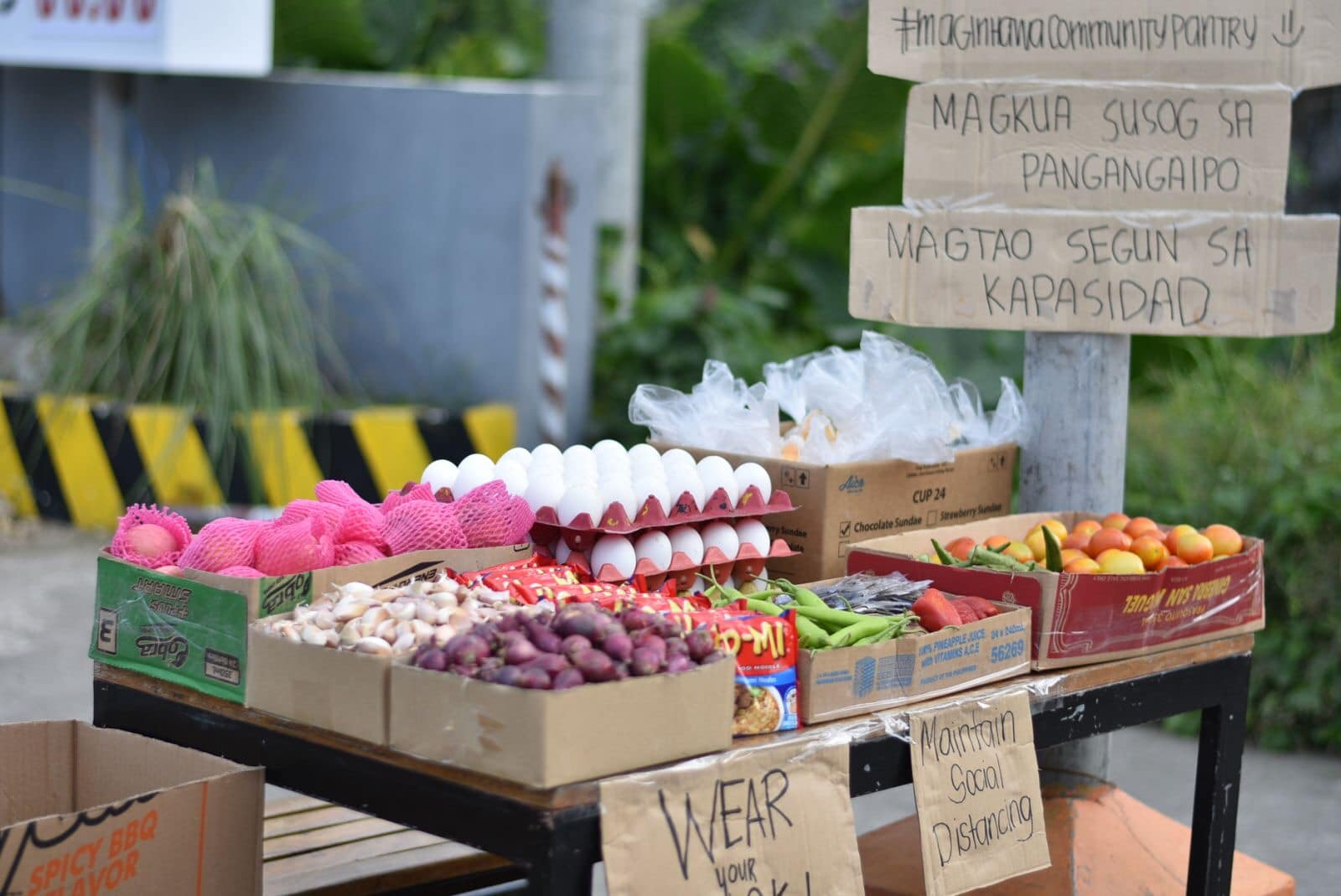
A community pantry in Camaligan, Camarines Sur

Community pantries in the Philippines are food banks established by Filipinos popularized during the country's COVID-19 community quarantine.

On April 14, 2021, local entrepreneur Ana Patricia Non worked with farmers and local vegetable vendors to put up a small food bank for her community on Maginhawa Street in Quezon City, putting up a sign that invited people to "give according to your ability, take according to your need." The initiative caught the attention of Filipinos on social media, creating a "snowball effect", with citizens setting up their own pantries in their communities and inspiring people from other countries to do the same.

Initiated without any government support, some community pantries and their organizers were initially interrogated and red-tagged by National Task Force to End Local Communist Armed Conflict (NTF-ELCAC) spokesperson Lt. Gen. Antonio Parlade Jr. and Presidential Communications Undersecretary Lorraine Badoy-Partosa as possible sympathizers and recruiters of insurgent left-wing militant organizations.

By April 20, 2021, press reports noted that there were already more than a hundred citizen-organized community pantries throughout the Philippines. On April 22, the Philippine Daily Inquirer reported that there were already at least 350 such pantries throughout the country.

== Challenges ==
In Berlin, community fridges were designed by the Foodsharing.de community as a social innovation to improve accessibility for the people most in need, who experienced gatekeeping effects from the need to use the online matchmaking service or to have personal connections with volunteers.

Challenges surrounding community fridges include maintaining cleanliness, ensuring food safety, and making sure that mutual aid model of community fridges is not abused (e.g. for for-profit resale). In the UK, setting up a community fridge requires: a rota of volunteers to clean the fridge and check the food; public liability insurance; the support of the local authority environmental health officer; and, evidently, a fridge and associated waste bins. Several community fridges in Germany were threatened with closure due to health concerns.

Community fridges are sometimes criticized for not providing a systemic solution to food insecurity. Fridges are needed by those who are actively hungry or do not have the means to access nutritious food, but do not address underlying causes of food insecurity.

Fridges are occasionally criticized for not addressing the needs of a community. In the USA, during a phase of rapid expansion, community fridges were sometime set up without consultation with the local community by people external to that community, accidentally reproducing some patterns of control typical of centrally managed food aid systems. To address such concerns, "The Love Fridge models partnership with community-based organisations run by Black and Brown individuals experienced in food security work for mutual benefit".

Often, food provided to the fridge does not meet the cultural and nutrition needs of the community. In addition, there is often controversy surrounding the legality of community fridges. Policies addressing maintaining a community fridge vary widely from community to community. In some USA states, fridges must be placed on private property, which makes them dependent on the owners willingness to participate. In Boston's Allston Neighborhood, the Allston community fridge was forced to move because new property owners were no longer willing to house them. In Chicago, residents worried about their landlord's reaction to a fridge located in their building. In New York, experiments were paired with initiatives to reuse abandoned publicly owned property and vacant lots.

== See also ==
- Little Free Pantries and Blessing Boxes
