= Give-away shop =

Stores where all goods are free

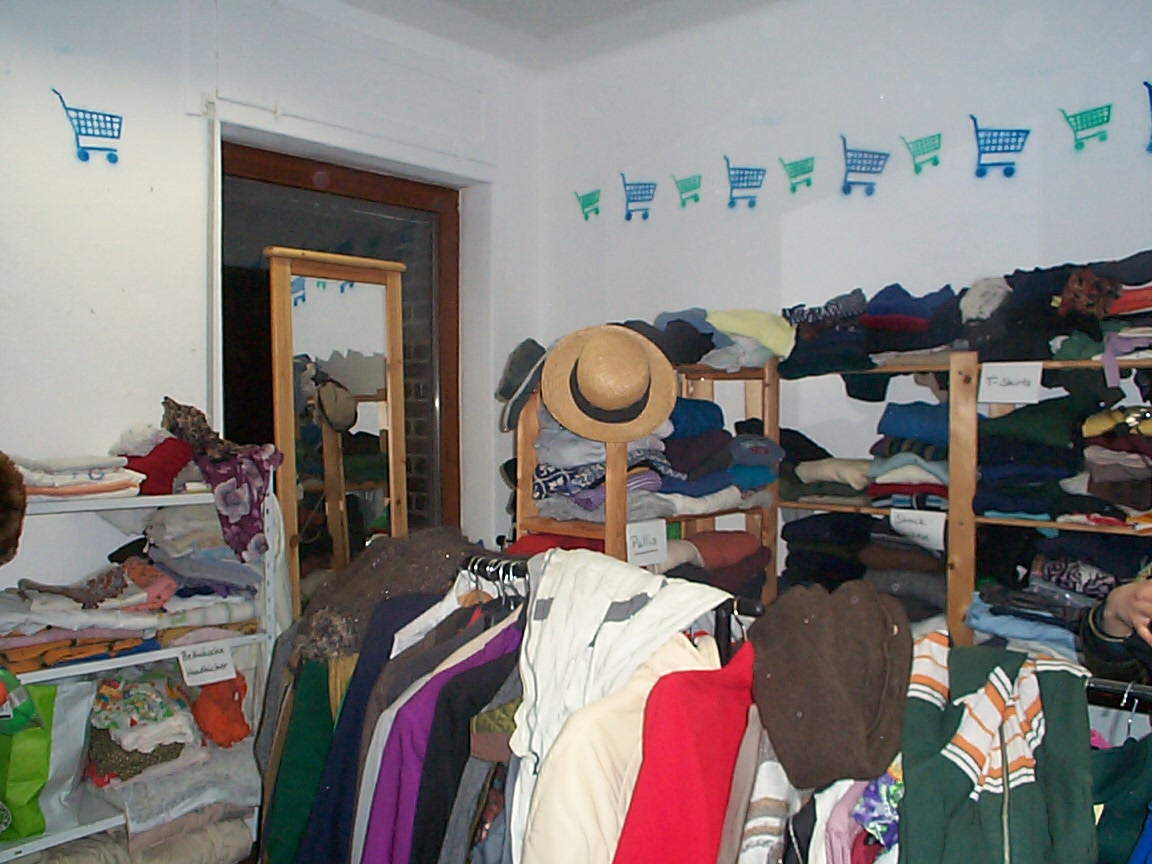
Inside a free shop in Freiburg, Germany

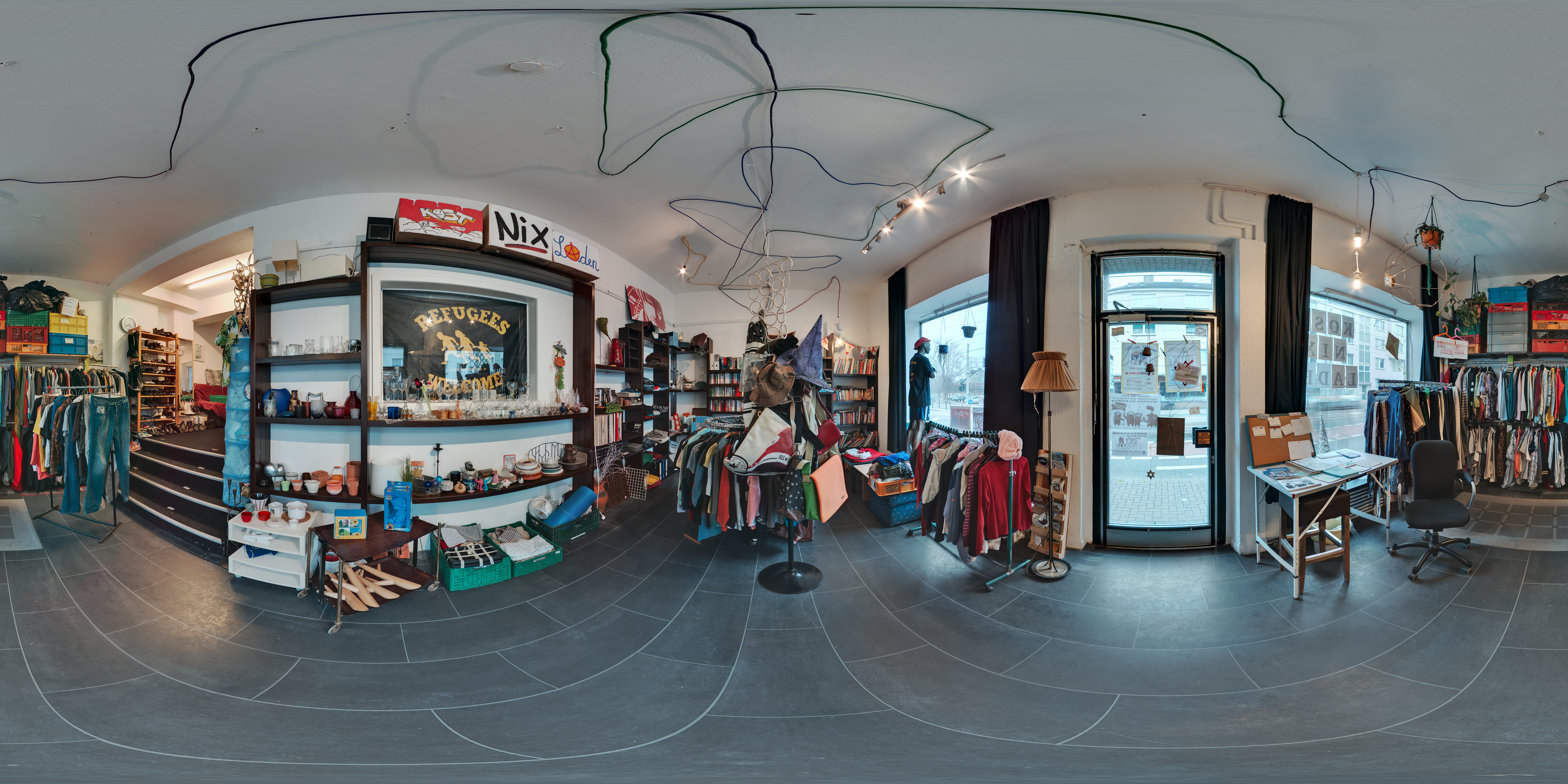
360° panorama of free shop in Bochum, Germany (view as a 360° interactive panorama)

Give-away shops are stores where all goods are free. They are similar to charity shops, with mostly second-hand items—except that everything is available at no cost. All goods are freely given away, although some operate a one-in, one-out–type policy (swap shops). Free stores constitute a form of constructive direct action that provides a shopping alternative to a monetary framework, allowing people to exchange goods and services outside of a money-based economy.

== Terminology ==
They may also be called freeshops, free stores or swap shops.

== History ==
The anarchist 1960s countercultural group the Diggers opened free stores that simply gave away their stock, provided free food, distributed free drugs, gave away money, organized free music concerts, and performed works of political art. The Diggers took their name from the original English Diggers led by Gerrard Winstanley and sought to create a mini-society free of money and capitalism.

== Similar phenomena ==
Another recent development in the give-away shop movement is the creation of the Freecycle Network. It began in Arizona for the purpose of connecting people who had extra belongings to get rid of with people who needed something, organized as discussion/distribution lists, and usually hosted on one of the free websites. Similar concepts emerged in Israel via the Agora Project in 2006, and in Australia via Ziilch in 2011. These websites allow for goods to be freely listed and acquired by others at no cost.

Trinket trade boxes work similarly to swap shops, with boxes using running on a "one in, one out" policy. However these boxes are normally installed on lampposts or railings and users are expected to solely trade trinkets.

== See also ==
- Charity (practice)
- Charity shop
- Drive (charity)
- Food bank
- Food Not Bombs
- Gift economy
- Recycling
- Regiving
- Reuse
- Second-hand shop
- Take a penny, leave a penny
- Trinket Trade Box
