= List of video game websites =

Video game website list

This is a list of video gaming-related websites. A video game is an electronic game that involves human interaction with a user interface to generate visual feedback on a video device such as a TV screen or computer monitor. The word video in video game traditionally referred to a raster display device, but it now implies any type of display device that can produce two- or three-dimensional images.

== List ==
Website	Launch	Defunct	Owner/Publisher	Language(s)	Type of Site
1Up.com	2003	2013	Ziff Davis	EN	Magazine
4gamer.net	2000		Aetas Inc.	JA	Magazine
4Players	2000		Computec Media GmbH	DE	Online game portal
ABCya.com	2004			EN	
Adult Swim		—N/a	Warner Bros. Entertainment	EN	Videos and games portal
Adventure Gamers	1998			EN	Magazine
Allgame	1998	2014	All Media Network	EN	Database
Amazon Digital Software & Video Games	2009			EN	Digital distribution portal
Arkadium	2001			EN	Interactive website content provider
Armor Games	2004			EN	Online game portal
Awomo				DE	Digital distribution portal
Beamdog	2010			EN	Social network
B'sLOG.com			Kadokawa Game Linkage	JA	News
Common Sense Media	2003			EN	Nonprofit organization
Cool Math Games	1997			EN	Online game portal
CrazyGames	2014		Raf Mertens	multiple	Browser-based gaming platform
Cutting Room Floor, The	2002	—N/a		EN	Wiki, archive
Denfaminico Gamer	2016	—N/a	Mare Co. Ltd.	JA	news, information
Dengeki Online		—N/a	Kadokawa Game Linkage	JA	News, information
Destructoid	2006	—N/a	Enthusiast Gaming	EN	Magazine, social network
Desura	2010		Bad Juju Games	EN	Digital distribution portal
Direct2Drive	2004		AtGames	EN	Digital distribution portal
DotEmu	2007		DotEmu SAS	EN	Digital distribution portal
Escapist, The	2005	—N/a	Enthusiast Gaming	EN	Magazine
Eurogamer	1999	—N/a	Gamer Network	EN	Magazine
Famitsu.com			Kadokawa Game Linkage	JA	News, information, archive
G2A			G2A	EN	Digital storefront
Gamasutra	1997	—N/a	UBM TechWeb	EN	Magazine
Game & Graphics	2010		Daruma Studio	EN	Blog
Game Informer	1996	—N/a	GameStop	EN	Magazine
Game Revolution	1996		CraveOnline Media, LLC	EN	Magazine
GameAgent	2008	2016	Aspyr	EN	Digital distribution portal
GameFAQs	1995	—N/a	CBS Interactive	EN	Database, user content
GameFly	2002		GameFly, Inc.	EN	Game rental & digital distribution portal
GameFront	1999		DBolical Pty, Ltd.	EN	Mod & patch digital distribution portal
GameHouse	1991		GameHouse	EN	Casual game developer and distributor
Gameplanet	2000	2020	Gameplanet Pty Ltd.	EN	Magazine
Gamepressure	2005		Webedia	EN	Magazine
Gamerang	2003	2019	Gamerang	En	Rental service
GameRankings	1999	—N/a	CBS Interactive	EN	Aggregator
GamersGate	2006		Gamersgate AB	EN	Digital distribution portal
Games Domain	1994	2005	Yahoo!	EN	Magazine
Gamekult	2000		Neweb	FR	Magazine
GameSpot	1996	—N/a	CBS Interactive	EN	Magazine
GameSpy	1996	2013	Ziff Davis	EN	Magazine
GamesRadar	2005	—N/a	Future plc	EN	Magazine
Gamestar	1997		Webedia	DE	Magazine
GameTrailers	2002	2016	Defy Media	EN	Video magazine
Gamezebo	2006		Gamezebo, Inc.	EN	Magazine
GameZnFlix	2004	2008		EN	Game rental
GameZombie	2007			EN	Video magazine
Giant Bomb	2008	—N/a		EN	Magazine, wiki
GOG.com	2008	—N/a	CD Projekt	EN	Digital distribution portal
GotFrag	2002	2015	ESEA League	EN	eSports news
Green Man Gaming	2010		Green Man Gaming Limited.	EN	Online retailer & digital distribution portal
Humble Bundle	2010	—N/a	IGN	EN	Online retailer & digital distribution portal
IGN	1996	—N/a	Ziff Davis	EN	Magazine
IMDb	1990	—N/a	Amazon	EN	Database
itch.io	2013	—N/a	Leaf Corcoran	EN	Digital distribution portal
Jay Is Games	2003		Jay Bibby	EN	Magazine (casual games)
Joystiq	2004	2015	AOL Inc.	EN	Magazine
Kongregate	2006	—N/a	GameStop	EN	Online game portal
Kotaku	2004	—N/a	Gizmodo Media Group	EN	Blog
Lik Sang	1998	2006		EN	Online games & merchandise store
Metacritic	1999	—N/a	CBS Interactive	EN	Aggregator
Miniclip	2001		Miniclip SA	EN	Online game portal
MobyGames	1999	—N/a	Blue Flame Labs	EN	Database, user content
ModDB	2002		Scott Reismanis		Mod community
Mud Connector, The	1995		Andrew Cowan	EN	Magazine (MUDs)
Newgrounds	1995	—N/a	Tom Fulp	EN	Online games & multimedia host
Nexus Mods	2007		Robin Scott		Mod community
NG-Gamer	2005	2014	Daan de Jong	NL	
Ninja Kiwi	2006		Ninja Kiwi	EN	Online game portal & developer
NoFrag	2001		NoCorp	FR	Magazine (FPSs)
Online Gaming Review	1995	—N/a	Strategy Plus	EN	Online game portal
Origin	2011	—N/a	Electronic Arts	EN	Digital distribution portal
PC Games	1992		Computec Media GmbH	DE	Magazine
Pelaajalehti.com	2002		H-Town Oy	FI	Magazine
Planet Half-Life	1999	2012	IGN	EN	Half-Life news
Playgama	2023	2023	Playgama	EN	Online game portal
Poki	2014		Sebastiaan Moeys and Michiel van Amerongen	34 languages	Browser-based gaming platform
Polygon	2012	—N/a	Vox Media	EN	Magazine
Rock Paper Shotgun	2007	—N/a	Gamer Network	EN	Blog
Roll20	2012	—N/a	The Orr Group	EN	Virtual tabletop
Romhacking.net	2005	2024		EN	Database, user content
Sarcastic Gamer	2007	2015		EN	Blog
ScrewAttack	2006		Fullscreen	EN	Video magazine
Shacknews	1996		Gamerhub	EN	Magazine
Steam	2003	—N/a	Valve	28 languages	Digital distribution portal
Twitch	2011	—N/a	Amazon	26 languages	Video streaming
UK Resistance	1996	2011	Gary Cutlack	EN	Magazine (Sega)
Video Games Chronicle	2019		1981 Media	EN	Magazine
Yahoo! Games	1998	2016	Yahoo!	EN	Online game portal
YouTube Gaming	2015	—N/a	Google	EN	Online video platform
Zapak	2006		Anil Dhirubhai Ambani Group	EN	Online game portal

== See also ==
- List of video game webcomics
- Lists of video games
