= A World of My Own =

A World of My Own may refer to:

- A World of My Own, an autobiographical novel of the first non-stop solo circumnavigation of the world by Robin Knox-Johnston
- A World of My Own: A Dream Diary, a 1992 autobiography of Graham Greene
- An internet game distribution and delivery system by Awomo
- "A World of My Own", a song by The Knack from their 2001 album Normal as the Next Guy
