= Locklizard =

Software companies of the United Kingdom

LockLizard Limited
- Type: Private
- Industry: Technology services
- Founded: 2004; 22 years ago
- Founder: Trevor Mathews
- Headquarters: London, United Kingdom
- Key people: Greg Mathews (Chairman & CEO)
- Products: Document security software
- Website: www.locklizard.com

LockLizard Limited is a British software company that specializes in digital rights management (DRM) security for PDF documents, USB flash drives and eBooks. It was founded in 2004 by Trevor Mathews to provide Document DRM software that uses encoding and encryption to protect against unauthorized copying, sharing, unlimited printing or printing on virtual devices, and screen grabbing on PCs or mobile devices.

== Technology ==
Locklizard implements a range of technologies accessible on PC or on the Cloud in order to achieve the features and functions necessary to protect a document. These technologies are DRM controls, document watermarking, US Government encryption, license control, and a proprietary secure PDF viewer. Additional DRM protection includes documents locking to specific devices or locations. Locklizard does not make use of password mechanisms, digital signatures, plug-ins, and temporary files. It delivers license codes and keys through secure online registration procedures with user-friendly PKI class technology.

== See also ==
- List of PDF software
