= Extra Life (fundraiser) =

Annual fundraising event

Extra Life is a fundraising event, the proceeds of which go to branches of the Children's Miracle Network Hospitals. 100% of all donations go directly to the hospitals.

Extra Life was formed in 2008 to honor Victoria Enmon, who died of acute lymphoblastic leukemia. It was aided by the Sarcastic Gamer community, who sent gifts and video games to her.

The main premise of the event is that group or teams get together and play different types of games for a 24 hour marathon. Many of these users will live-stream their game-play and activities on the platform Twitch. During this process, players will ask for donations that will then be sent to Children's Miracle Network Hospitals. Groups that participate range from Austin, Texas media company Rooster Teeth, to East Carolina University Board Gaming Society, and donations are given through cash or credit donation. Many participants have connections to the hospitals that they chose to highlight and donate their proceeds to and some donation pages continue to accept donations until December 31 of the year of the event.

== Event totals and participant numbers ==
- 2008: $120,000
  - Gamers: 1200
- 2009: $170,000
  - Gamers: Unknown
- 2010: $451,000
  - Gamers: 4,500
- 2011: $1,100,000
  - Gamers: 15,500
- 2012: $2,100,000
  - Gamers: 17,000
- 2013: $4,100,000
  - Gamers: 43,000
- 2014: $6,218,000
  - Gamers: 50,000
- 2015: $8,451,590
  - Gamers: 55,000
- 2016: $9,600,000
  - Gamers: 50,000
- 2017: $11,124,217
  - Gamers: 50,000
- 2018: $8,800,000
  - Gamers: 50,000
- 2019: $14,000,000
  - Gamers: 50,000
- 2022: over $10,000,000
  - Gamers: 50,000
