= Video Games Chronicle =

Video game website

- Logo used since 2019

- Home page in December 2023
- Website type: Gaming website
- Available in: English
- Owner: 1981 Media
- Editor: Andy Robinson
- Website: videogameschronicle.com
- Commercial: Yes
- Launched: 2 May 2019; 7 years ago
- Current status: Active

Video Games Chronicle (VGC) is a British entertainment website covering video games published independently by 1981 Media. Led by editor-in-chief Andy Robinson, the team consists largely of former Computer and Video Games staff. Launched in May 2019 in partnership with Gamer Network, VGC sought to blend professional and mainstream publications to complement the works of other video game websites. The website received five million monthly readers and seven million page views as of December 2020, and has been twice nominated for Media Brand of the Year at the MCV/Develop Awards.

== History ==
The gaming website Video Games Chronicle (VGC) was launched on 2 May 2019, led by former staff of Computer and Video Games (CVG), including editor-in-chief Andy Robinson, news editor Tom Ivan, and editorial support from Paul Davies, Tim Ingham, and Chris Scullion. Additional content is written by freelance writers. The website is published independently through 1981 Media Ltd, while Gamer Network manages advertising and sales. The team sought to launch a website immediately after CVG's closure in 2015, but each joined different teams; Robinson worked at Playtonic Games but "could never totally ignore the itch" to return to journalism. The team found they were all available in early 2019 and created a business plan; Robinson felt it was an appropriate time in the console generation for a new website.

Robinson sought for VGC to blend industry publications like GamesIndustry.biz and "mainstream sites", covering subjects most relevant to consumers to complement the work of websites such as Eurogamer, GamesIndustry.biz, and Kotaku. The website was built by 44 Bytes and run by Kornel Lambert and Andrew Taylor. In April 2020, the site received 1.24 million individual readers, generating 1.7 million page views; this increased to 5 million readers and 7 million page views in December, an annual increase of more than 400%. Scullion was appointed VGC's part-time features editor in December 2020. VGC expanded into video content with daily news show VGC Source from April 2020, followed by the chat show VGC Off the Record from July. In February 2023, VGC partnered with Stak to launch a weekly podcast, hosted by VGC's Jordan Middler, Robinson, and Scullion, and Stak's Pete Donaldson, alongside industry guests.

VGC was the first to report on Japan Studio's reorganisation in February 2021, E3 2021's in-person cancellation in March, and Twitch's data breach in October. In April, Robinson and VGC's Twitter accounts were temporarily locked after Activision submitted takedowns using the Digital Millennium Copyright Act; VGC had posted stories about upcoming maps for Call of Duty: Warzone. IGN reported that the leaks had been covered legitimately and Robinson and VGC's tweets had not contained any copyrighted material. Robinson spoke with Activision and felt the conflict had been resolved. Similar takedowns had been issued the preceding August against several outlets, including VGC, who reported on leaks related to Call of Duty: Black Ops Cold War after the information had been officially announced. Kotaku's Ian Walker said Activision's actions only confirmed the leak, describing it as an example of the Streisand effect.

VGC won Media Brand of the Year at the MCV/Develop Awards in 2025, having been nominated each year from 2022. The site partnered with the Italian Interactive Digital Entertainment Association to stream the Italian Video Game Awards to English-speaking audiences in 2022, receiving 92,000 live viewers; the partnership continued in 2023.
