= Game & Graphics =

Documentary blog

Game & Graphics (sometimes written Game And Graphics) is a documentary blog about the visual creativity in the videogame culture.

The website contains a curated collection of videogame design works, including logotypes, printed advertising, cover and label designs, packaging, book and magazine designs, official artworks and illustrations, and sprite designs among others. This selection is focused on retro gaming with an emphasis on Japanese game design.

== History ==
The site was created in 2010 by Daruma Studio, a graphic design studio originally based in Barcelona, run by freelance designer Sebastià López. After working for several videogame developers, Sebastià found that there was a lack of websites focused on gaming culture graphics, excluding from here random collections of fan art.

The goal was to create a blog site edited and curated from the perspective of a graphic designer, where other graphic designers could find inspiration from the visual designs in the history of videogames, and at the same time be an favorable place for videogame culture enthusiasts.

After some years of running, Daruma Studio also has contributed to the site with original designs that pay tribute to some of the largest icons of gaming culture in the form of t-shirts, limited collections of printed works, illustrations and animated GIFs.

== My Famicase Exhibition participation ==
Game & Graphics and Daruma Studio have been part of the collective exhibition "My Famicase" since 2010. My Famicase is an exhibition organized in Tokyo by Satoshi Sakagami, designer and owner of Meteor shop, and every year shows fictional Famicom cartridge labels made by designers, illustrators and artists.

Game & Graphics and Daruma Studio were in 2010 one of the first non-Japanese designers to participate in the exhibition.

== Other notable participations ==
- Game & Graphics participated in the retrogaming fair RetroBarcelona with a booth (2013).
- Some Game & Graphics original designs will be featured in the upcoming book "Everyday is Play" (GamePaused, 2014).
