= Prey Invasion =

2009 video game

- Developers: Machine Works NorthWest, 3D Realms
- Publisher: Hands-On Mobile
- Designer: Scott Miller
- Series: Prey
- Platform: iOS
- Release: June 8, 2009
- Genre: First-person shooter
- Mode: Single-player

Prey Invasion is a first-person shooter video game developed by American studio MachineWorks, and published by Hands-On Mobile in cooperation with 3D Realms for the iOS. It is based on Prey for Microsoft Windows and Xbox 360.

== Plot ==
The player is the present-day Cherokee warrior Tommy Hawk who has special native powers.

== Development ==
Prey Invasion was first announced February 9, 2009 by IGN, the game was released on June 8, 2009.

== Reception ==
Reception

Aggregate score
Aggregator	Score
GameRankings	60%

Review scores
Publication	Score
GameZone	7/10
IGN	8/10

Prey Invasion was well received by critics with many applauding the control scheme, graphics, and pricepoint.
