= Infinite MHz =

Infinite MHz is a TV show from the mid-1990s to early 2001 about PC games. It primarily aired on public-access television cable TV throughout New England, and was based out of Cape Cod, MA. It only held out for a brief period on national cable television. The two creator/hosts were Jess Holderbaum and Bradley Ouimette with guest appearances by Jim Peterson.

The show followed a basic format. First the introduction of the game with a discussion, then the intro of the actual game was played. Then there was discussion on gameplay and various segments of interviews with the creators of the game. Then Jess Holderbaum would go in front of a Bluescreen showing the actual game. He would point out gameplay and basic features. Last, a cheat segment would feature a fictional character named "Cheatin' Jim", showing some key cheats and Easter eggs by the developers. Each game/segment typically ran for 15 minutes and each show usually contained 2 games.

It had a small web presence and was famed for two web interviews from E3 of Prey that is widely circulated among fans of the now released game.

== Controversy ==
In March 2001 there was an episode on Back Orifice and a Trojan called SubSeven that exposed computer viruses. This episode disappeared under mysterious circumstances. This was the last recorded show.
