= Children's Miracle Network =

Nonprofit organization based in Salt Lake City

- Founded: August 11, 1983
- Founder: Marie Osmond; John Schneider; Mick Shannon; Joe Lake
- Type: Children's charity
- Tax ID no.: 87-0387205
- Purpose: Children's hospitals
- Headquarters: Salt Lake City, Utah
- Location: Salt Lake City, Utah, U.S.
- Coordinates: 40°45′13″N 111°53′48″W
- Region served: United States, Canada
- Subsidiaries: Extra Life; Dance Marathon; Play Yellow
- Website: cmn.org
- Formerly called: Children's Miracle Network Hospitals, Children's Miracle Network; Osmond Foundation, For the Children of the World

Children's Miracle Network, founded in 1983 with a logo hot air balloon

Children's Miracle Network (CMN) is a nonprofit organization that raises funds for children's hospitals in the U.S. and Canada. Donations support the health of more than 12 million children each year.

Donations, which go to local hospitals, fund critical life-saving treatments and healthcare services along with research, medical equipment, emotional, and health support during difficult hospital stays, as well as financial assistance. CMN funds are unrestricted. Donations are directed to local member hospitals so they can be used where they are needed the most.

The organization, founded in 1983 by Marie Osmond, John Schneider, Mick Shannon, and Joe Lake, is headquartered in Salt Lake City, Utah. The current president and CEO is Aimee Daily, Ph.D. To date, CMN has raised more than US$9 billion, which is distributed to a network of 170 hospitals.

== History ==
Children's Miracle Network began as a telethon in 1983. Shannon and Lake conceived the telethon with Schneider and Osmond serving as hosts. The first telethon raised $4.8 million for 22 hospitals. The telethon continued as a major fundraising arm for the organization for many years, and some hospital markets still use it today.

The organization rebranded to Children's Miracle Network in 2026, after going by Children's Miracle Network Hospitals since 2011, and Children's Miracle Network prior to that. Currently, CMN benefits the largest network of children's hospitals in both the U.S. and Canada. The organization's member hospitals provide 32 million treatments each year to children across the U.S. and Canada. Most of the organization's funding, totaling $9 billion, has been raised through the charity's "Miracle Balloon" campaign.

== Fundraising ==
Children's Miracle Network raises money each year to support local children's hospitals. CMN's fundraising efforts include corporate fundraising campaigns with more than 80 corporate partners and fundraising programs including Dance Marathon, the global Extra Life gaming platform, Play Yellow, and Radiothon, which hosts radio fundraisers through radio stations in support of their CMN Hospital.

Corporate fundraising partners include Walmart, Panda Express, Ace Hardware, Sam's Club, Costco Wholesale, Wawa, RE/MAX, IHOP, Credit Unions For Kids, Love's Travel Stops, Costco, CDW, Delta Air Lines, Publix, Rite Aid, Dairy Queen, Sigma Chi, Delta Zeta, Domino Sugar, Phi Mu, Speedway LLC, Phi Delta Epsilon, Phi Kappa Theta, Zeta Beta Tau, Sigma Alpha Epsilon, and Marriott International. In 2019, Walmart celebrated $1 billion raised for CMN Hospitals through its partnership with the organization.

Many universities host annual Dance Marathon events to support Children's Miracle Network and other local children's hospitals. These events have collectively raised more than $350 million to support CMN services, such as the Indiana University Dance Marathon which raised more than $36 million for Riley Hospital for Children in Indianapolis, Indiana.

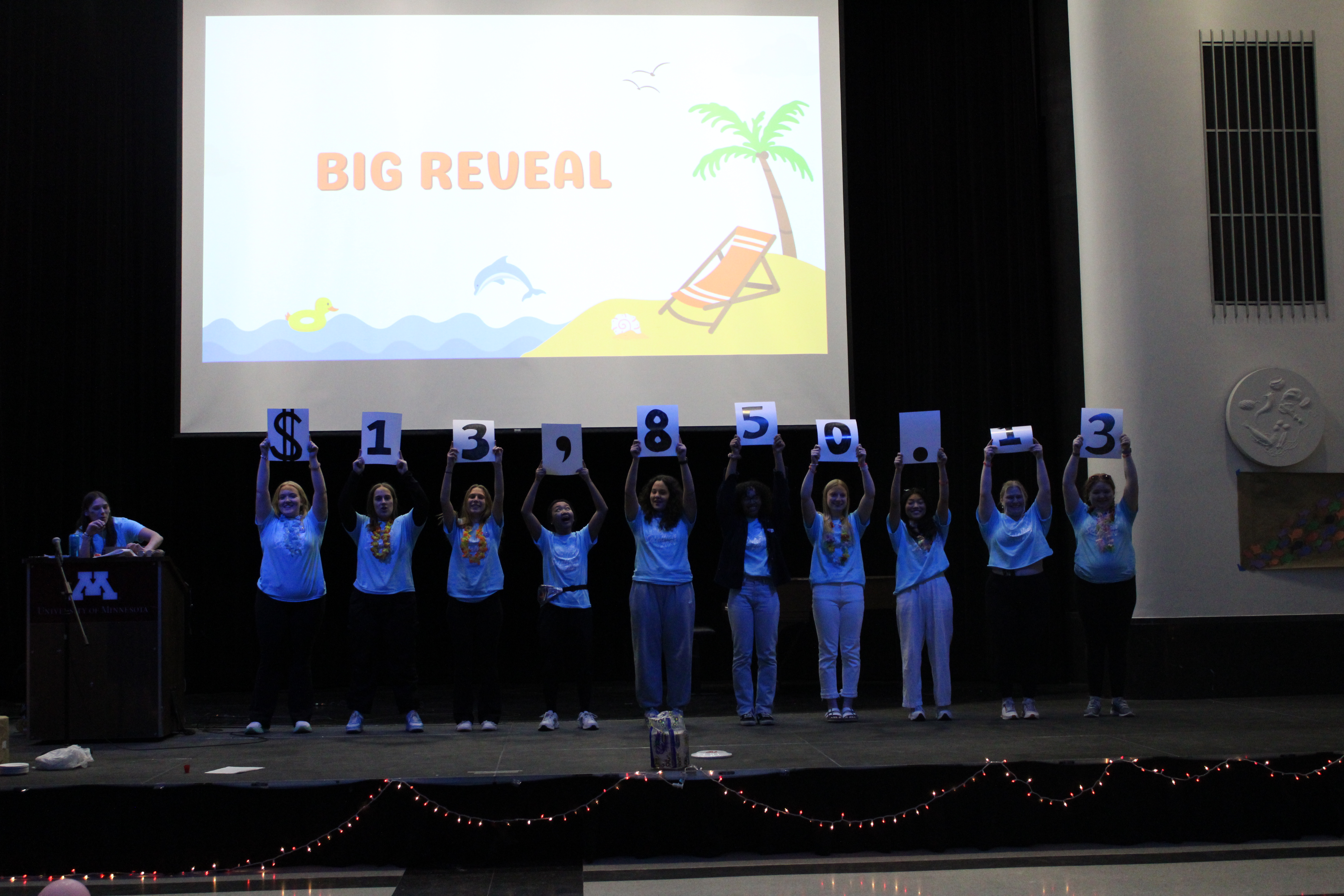
Dance Marathon at the University of Minnesota 2024 fundraising total at 'Sotathon

Extra Life is another Children's Miracle Network program that unites tens of thousands of gamers globally to play games and raise funds year-round to support kids treated at their local CMN hospital. Since its inception in 2008, Extra Life has raised more than $100 million.

In 2021, Ferrero Candy partnered with CMN Hospitals and launched a campaign. "Three iconic Ferrero candy bars, Butterfinger, CRUNCH and Baby Ruth, are joining forces to help the Children's Miracle Network Hospitals."

As part of a nationwide initiative to raise funds for the Children's Miracle Network, Wilkes University and Lackawanna College's Esports Program organized their fourth annual gaming event at Bartari on Sunday, November 3, 2024. The event was streamed for 12 hours and anyone was welcome to join the campaigners.

== Awards and accolades ==
The organization has received multiple Gold & Silver Halo awards from the Cause Marketing Forum for its marketing campaigns with organizations including IHOP and Aflac. The organization won The Golden Halo in 2014. CMN Hospitals won a Shorty Award in 2019 in Best Facebook Live for their #ChildrensHospitalsWeek Live-athon. Utah Business Magazine also named CMN Hospitals one of Utah's Best Companies to Work For in 2015.
