= Prey (2006 video game) =

- Developer: Human Head Studios (Note: Ported to Xbox 360 by Venom Games)
- Publisher: 2K Games
- Director: Chris Rhinehart
- Producers: Tim Gerritsen; George Broussard
- Programmer: Paul MacArthur
- Artist: Rowan Atalla
- Writers: David Freeman; Dean Orion; Gary Whitta
- Composer: Jeremy Soule
- Engine: id Tech 4
- Platforms: Microsoft Windows; Xbox 360; Mac OS X; Linux
- Release: Windows, Xbox 360: NA: July 11, 2006; EU/AU: July 14, 2006; Mac OS X: NA: January 15, 2007; Linux: NA: December 7, 2008
- Genre: First-person shooter
- Modes: Single-player, multiplayer

Prey is a 2006 first-person shooter game developed by Human Head Studios, under contract for 3D Realms, and published by 2K Games, while the Xbox 360 version was ported by Venom Games. The game was initially released in North America and Europe on July 11, 2006. Prey uses a heavily modified version of id Tech 4 to use portals and variable gravity to create the environments the player explores.

The game's story is focused on Cherokee Domasi "Tommy" Tawodi as he, his girlfriend, and grandfather are abducted aboard an alien spaceship known as The Sphere as it consumes material, both inanimate and living, from Earth in order to sustain itself. Tommy's Cherokee heritage allows him to let his spirit roam freely at times and resurrect, giving Tommy an edge in his battle against the Sphere.

Prey had been in development in one form or another since 1995, and has had several major revisions. While the general approach to gameplay, including the use of portals, remained in the game, the story and setting changed several times. The game received generally positive reviews, with critics praising its graphics and gameplay but criticizing its multiplayer component for a lack of content.

Prey was a commercial success, selling more than one million copies in the first two months of its release and leading to the abortive development of its sequel Prey 2. The rights to Prey passed on to Bethesda Softworks, who released a game of the same name, developed by Arkane Studios, in 2017.

== Gameplay ==
A puzzle featuring wall-walking

Prey is a first-person shooter with the player in control of the protagonist Tommy as he explores the gigantic extraterrestrial craft Sphere and fights its inhabitants aboard. During the game, the player will collect a number of alien weapons, some comparable to typical first-person shooter archetypes, others more alien in behavior.

The game's engine introduces two unique aspects to exploration. Portals in the game can transport the player from one area to another instantly; portals can be looked and shot through and can also be traveled in reverse. Unlike the later game Portal, the player cannot create portals directly without the use of mods, and portals remain fixed in space. The game also features variable gravity. Special paths allow the player to walk along them, remaining upright regardless of orientation, though should the player fall or voluntarily jump off the path, gravity will reassert itself. Small planetoids inside The Sphere can also exhibit their own gravity fields, allowing the player to walk completely around the outside of it.

The player can detach Tommy's spirit from his body, allowing the spirit to roam freely for a short time. The spirit has limited interaction with the environment, though it is able to activate control panels and can use a spirit bow to strike at foes. The spirit force is often used to solve environmental puzzles within the game as well as to locate paths that are not visible to mortal eyes. Although Tommy dies when his health is depleted, he is resurrected after a brief period during which his spirit can increase the health the revived body will have. Two vehicles make an appearance; one is a flying vehicle used frequently for travel and attacking (as well as puzzle solving), and one is only used for a short period near the end of the game.

The bar that the game begins in is interactive, with usable restroom facilities, a TV with various channels (including a clip from Duck and Cover), a fully playable Pac-Man-style game called Rune Man (referring to a previous game by Human Head entitled Rune), several video casino machines (including blackjack, draw poker, and a slot machine), and a jukebox that plays a small selection of licensed songs.

== Plot ==
Domasi "Tommy" Tawodi (voiced by Michael Greyeyes) is a Cherokee mechanic and former United States Army soldier living on a Native American reservation in Oklahoma. The game begins with Tommy in a bar owned by his girlfriend, Jen. Tired of life on the reservation, Tommy tries to convince Jen to leave it with him, but she refuses. After a fight between the two, a fight erupts when two men at the bar will not leave. The building is lifted up by some kind of force into a green light above. Tommy, Jen, Tommy's grandfather Enisi, and other captives are transported to a massive alien starship called the Sphere. Tommy is freed in an explosion set off by a mysterious stranger, who, despite being a cybernetic being like most of the Sphere's inhabitants, appears to be working against the Sphere.

Tommy witnesses Enisi's brutal death in an alien device. While attempting to find Jen, he has a near-death experience and travels to an afterlife known as the Land of The Ancients, where his grandfather bestows spiritual powers upon him. Tommy gains the ability to separate from his body to pass through obstacles, come back to life after being killed, and aid from his spirit guide, the ghost of his childhood pet hawk, Talon. Despite being entrusted by his ancestors with the mission to protect Earth from the Sphere, Tommy is only interested in rescuing Jen.

Tommy finds Jen, whose torso has been surgically attached to a reptile-like creature that attempts to kill Tommy. Because Jen cannot control the beast she is attached to, Tommy is reluctantly forced to kill it, in the process also mercy-killing Jen. Tommy learns that the Sphere is an organic alien ship with the main goal of maintaining itself by preying on various alien races. The Sphere houses many of these alien races, which have become mindless drones in servitude of the Sphere. The Keepers of the Sphere, who appear to be responsible for its creation, plant life on other planets, and periodically return to harvest it. A small band of human rebels on the Sphere named the Hidden have not lost control of themselves. Led by Elhuit, the Hidden hope to destroy the Sphere and return to Earth.

Artwork depicting the Sphere as viewed from space

Tommy finds that the Keepers and their drones are controlled by the Mother (voiced by Tyne Turner), who communicates telepathically with him throughout the game. She reveals to Tommy that she was once human, too, and fought the previous Mother of the Sphere, who persuaded her to take its place as the new Mother. After Tommy defeats her, the Mother begs Tommy to take her place, acquiring god-like powers in the process, or else the Sphere will perish. While tempted, Enisi's spirit contacts Tommy, reminding him of his humanity and duty. Tommy heeds his grandfather's advice and drives the Sphere into the Sun, and ends up in the Land of the Ancients once more to see Enisi and Jen. Tommy returns to Earth, knowing that he will see them both again when it is his time to live in the Land of the Ancients.

In a post-credits scene taking place six months later, Tommy has rebuilt the bar. The official story of the bar's disappearance is that the original building and the people within it at the time of its disappearance vanished due to an unknown natural phenomenon. Elhuit arrives in the bar and explains to Tommy that she and other Hidden escaped through a portal just before Tommy destroyed the Sphere, and tells Tommy that powerful beings elsewhere wish to meet him. Tommy steps through a portal made by Elhuit as the words "Prey will continue ..." appear on-screen.

== Development ==
Prey's long development history spans over a decade, starting in 1995. It went through several iterations of the game design and software technology before its eventual release in 2006.

=== False starts ===
In 1995, the first incarnation of the game was announced. Prey was envisioned by 3D Realms as the first of a number of games to be running on unique, cutting edge game engine technology, developed in house. In this sense the project played the same role as Unreal did for Epic Games, and it would retain this role in the company's strategy throughout its development time in the 3D Realms studios.

Prey as a game was to go through many different forms during this first development period. A rapid succession of different designs was outlined by Tom Hall (previously of id Software and later of Ion Storm), who was at that time fresh off the Rise of the Triad team at Apogee Software. After about a year's worth of work, however, Tom Hall abandoned the project and left the company to form Ion Storm with ex-id compatriot John Romero.

At this point, 3D Realms brought on Paul Schuytema to begin the next phase in the game's development. The new team would go on to create a new game design. The alien abduction theme from Hall's work was retained, but now the game was to be set on a massive, ring-shaped artificial world called "Trocara", inhabited by four different alien races, one of them called "the Keepers". The player would take the role of a Native American hero, called Talon Brave.

A screenshot from the 1997 build of the game showing the main character "Talon Brave"

The game was the first in the genre to make use of moveable portal technology, a feature that allowed rips in space to be created, moved and reshaped in real time. This was to be a core feature of the gameplay, along with heavily destructible environments. It was also thought at the time this engine would be used for Duke Nukem 5 (the game after Duke Nukem Forever), but Duke Nukem 5 was never released. Demonstrations of these features drew widespread acclaim at the 1997 and 1998 E3 exhibitions – the television program Infinite MHz was able to capture exclusive footage of the game's private behind-closed-doors demo at both of the game's E3 showings. The public perception was very positive, the game looked impressive, and 3D Realms' name, fresh from the success of Duke Nukem 3D, was a mark of quality.

German industrial band KMFDM was to create the game's soundtrack. 3D Realms posted on their website in 1997 that they received a sample of the soundtrack from KMFDM and highly praised the music, described as "ambient industrial". On December 19, 1997, 3D Realms also released two KMFDM songs in MP3 format (that are not on the Prey soundtrack), "Inane" and "Megalomaniac".

Seemingly insurmountable technical problems ground development to a near-halt, and this version of Prey too fell apart. Later, on an Internet discussion board head engineer William Scarboro would comment that "in hindsight, portal tricks such as these should be used as tricks, not as an engine paradigm."

Shortly after the Schuytema variant of Prey disbanded, 3D Realms attempted again to revive the project by bringing on tech programmer Corrinne Yu in November 1998. Development of the game itself was not part of this effort, Yu was working by herself on the game engine exclusively.

The title was put on indefinite hold (although never formally canceled, contrary to popular opinion). On March 8, 2000, Prey.net (an early Prey site with a section about KMFDM) released a RealAudio file of a third KMFDM song: "Missing Time", which was going to be part of the Prey soundtrack but was featured in the film Heavy Metal 2000 instead (under the name MDFMK which is a side project of KMFDM members during their temporary break-up).

=== Final production ===
The game was developed with a 30 person team. In 2001, 3D Realms began development on a new version of the title. This time, with the advantage of the necessary portal technology already being a stable and functional component of all modern game engines, 3D Realms was able to license the necessary technology instead of having to develop it. 3D Realms chose the id Tech 4 game engine from id Software, and Rune developer Human Head Studios was commissioned to develop the game using the previous designs as a base.

A screenshot from the final build of the game showing the main character "Domasi Tawodi" a.k.a. "Tommy"

Rumors of this new project leaked out to the public in 2002, through the website Evil Avatar, but were at that time denied in the 3D Realms forums by Joe Siegler. It was not until 2005, when the cryptic clue "Keep your eyes open for the unveiling of our next game very soon." appeared on the 3D Realms website that the previous rumors were confirmed in any way. This was followed by a CNN article by Chris Morris, claiming that Prey was not only in development, but that it would be shown at E3. Soon afterwards, the official Prey teaser site was launched, confirming the game's existence, and hinting that more would be revealed in the June issue of PC Gamer, which indeed featured a seven-page article on Prey.

Prey was officially announced in a press release by 2K Games on April 26, 2005. On April 28, 2006, a July 10 release date was announced (although 3D Realms claims that is not the formal release date since it did not come from them or Human Head). On May 19, 2006, 3D Realms announced that a demo of Prey would be released on June 22, 2006—the PC demo was released on this date, but the Xbox 360 demo was delayed until June 30. On June 28, it was announced that Prey had officially gone gold. A playable single and multiplayer demo of the game was released on June 22, 2006, for Microsoft Windows, and a downloadable Xbox 360 demo was released on the Xbox Live Marketplace on June 30, 2006.

The June 2005 issue of PC Gamer revealed that the game uses a heavily modified version of id Tech 4 capable of rendering "huge cavernous spaces as well as more traditional passages". The game also supports the dynamic portals that were seen in the 1997/1998 video clips, which are used by friends and foes alike. It also has the ability to change gravity in many parts of the game, via small items that need to be shot to become active, which is used to solve many puzzles throughout the game. Various landscapes in the game (large rocks, for example) have their own gravity that overrides the normal gravity in the game.

=== Cherokee culture ===
Domasi (Tommy) Tawodi's background was chosen due to the amount of mythology in Cherokee oral tradition, which 3D Realms had planned to use for a number of games. When it was first revealed that the game's protagonist would be a Native American, the response was mixed due to concerns that he would be a stereotyped caricature, and that players would have difficulty identifying with a Native American character. Tommy is voiced by Michael Greyeyes, and Jen is voiced by Crystle Lightning, who are both Plains Cree. Greyeyes approved of the way that Tommy was depicted in the game, contrasting Prey to a film production:

I was impressed with the way [3D Realms] conceived of and wrote Tommy ... Hollywood typically relegates our different indigenous cultures either into a single pan-Indian construct of some type — radical AIM protester type; slick, corporate, anglicized casino businessman type; etcetera — or, most commonly, as a historical figure, typically from a Plains culture. In fact, the overwhelming majority of roles written for native actors are in the Western genre. There are few opportunities for us to appear outside that paradigm, and when we do it is often equally narrow in focus ... The writers [at 3D Realms] were always open to my comments — which I freely offered — and took my notes seriously, in nearly all instances changing dialogue or thematic content.

== Release ==
The game was released to manufacturing on June 28, 2006, and was released in North America on July 11, 2006, and on July 14, 2006, in Europe and Australia. Prey was the only major title to utilize the new Triton distribution system, which went out of business months after the game's launch. Following the demise of Triton, Prey moved to distribution via Steam.

Prey shipped in a Limited Collector's Edition for both PC and Xbox 360. It came with an embossed collector's tin, an upgrade to one DVD-ROM (as opposed to three CD-ROMs), two pewter figurines (Hunter and Tommy), "The Art of Prey" booklet, and a free soundtrack download from DirectSong. A third (Mutate) pewter figurine was available separately for purchase to complete the collection of three pewter figurines.

=== Ports ===
On November 29, 2006, Aspyr Media announced a Mac port, which was shipped on January 15, 2007. On October 24, 2008, a Linux client for the Prey demo was released by Ryan C. Gordon, who had been working on porting the game for several months. Later that year, on December 7, 2008, the Linux client for the full retail version was made available.

=== Soundtrack ===
The soundtrack was composed by award-winning composer Jeremy Soule and his brother, Julian Soule. The Prey soundtrack was released in two volumes (nearly two hours of the game's three-hour score). The end credits feature the song "Take Me Home" by After Midnight Project.

There are several jukeboxes in the game which allow the player to choose from a small selection of licensed songs. In addition, radio host Art Bell lends his voice to several fictional segments of his paranormal-themed radio show, Coast to Coast AM, that play from radios throughout the game. In the segments, he talks with many callers about the various alien phenomena that occur in the game.

== Reception ==
Prey

Aggregate score
Aggregator	Score
Metacritic	PC: 83/100; X360: 79/100

Review scores
Publication	Score
Edge	8/10
Game Informer	9.5/10
GameSpot	7.5/10
IGN	9.0/10
X-Play	4/5

Prey has a Metacritic average of 83 and 79 out of 100 on the PC and Xbox 360, respectively. The game was highly praised for its graphics and gameplay. GameZone called the graphics "top notch", while Play magazine called them "incredible". GamerFeed lauded the gameplay system, calling it "nothing short of amazing", and concluding that "Prey has got everything anyone could want from a sci-fi shooter and more." However, there was criticism directed at the multiplayer component, especially the fact that it only had two game modes. GamesRadar opined that the multiplayer "could have been much better if only there were more than two modes [and] a couple of maps small enough to play with less than five players."

In October 2006, 3D Realms CEO Scott Miller announced that the game was a commercial success on both PC and Xbox 360 with combined 1 million copies sold worldwide to date. Prey is ranked third on Game Informer's list of The Top 10 Video Game Openings.

The editors of PC Gamer US awarded Prey their 2006 "Best Action Game" and "Best Multiplayer Game" awards. During the 10th Annual Interactive Achievement Awards, the Academy of Interactive Arts & Sciences nominated Prey for "Computer Game of the Year" and "First-Person Action Game of the Year".

== Legacy ==
Shortly after the game's release, 3D Realms' Scott Miller confirmed that a sequel named Prey 2 was in development. On March 17, 2008, Miller's brand-management group Radar Group was launched, along with the announcement that it was managing Prey 2, slated for release for PC and Xbox 360. The game was being developed in cooperation with Human Head Studios.

Prey Invasion is a first-person shooter video game developed by MachineWorks, and published by Hands-On Mobile in cooperation with 3D Realms for iOS.

In 2009, the rights to the franchise were acquired by Bethesda Softworks and id Software parent company ZeniMax Media. On October 30, 2014, during PAX Australia, Bethesda Softworks vice-president Pete Hines confirmed that Prey 2 has subsequently been canceled. Pete Hines stated as follows, "it was a game we believed in, but we never felt that it got to where it needed to be – we never saw a path to success if we finished it. It wasn't up to our quality standard, and we decided to cancel it. It's no longer in development. That wasn't an easy decision, but it's one that won't surprise many folks given that we hadn't been talking about it. Human Head Studios is no longer working on it. It's a franchise we still believe we can do something with — we just need to see what that something is."

During its 2016 E3 press conference, Bethesda announced Prey developed by Arkane Studios, for release in 2017 on Windows, PlayStation 4, and Xbox One. The new game is not connected to the previous game.

Eventually, the team would come full circle after the 2019 closure of Human Head Studios shortly after the release of Rune II with most of the staff moving on to Bethesda-managed Roundhouse Studios.

On December 24, 2022, an early, playable 1995 prototype of Prey was leaked to the Internet.
