= Triton (content delivery) =

Brand of digital delivery service

Triton was a digital delivery and digital rights management service created by Digital Interactive Streams, which abruptly went out of business in early October 2006.

Triton was a new competitor in the rapidly growing market for electronic distribution of video games. Triton was being used to serve budget-oriented games from such publishers as Strategy First and Global Star Software, and was most known for distributing Prey.

== History ==
Triton was launched on November 10, 2004, under the name Game xStream. The service signed several smaller publishers shortly thereafter, and announced its first high-profile deal in May 2005, signing 3D Realms and its then in-development FPS Prey.

Game xStream was renamed to its current title of Triton on May 8, 2006.

In early October, 2006, owners of Prey who had purchased it via Triton began to complain about problems purchasing the game, activating it, and reaching customer service. 3D Realms' webmaster Joe Siegler managed to find out that Triton and Digital Interactive Streams had gone out of business suddenly and apparently without warning.

A follow-up from Royal O'Brien of Triton said that Prey owners who use Triton won't lose their game. A patch was in development to remove the dependency from the live system and allow you to back up/copy and play your games. However, customers who purchased the game through Triton will receive a retail copy.

Prey was released on Valve's Steam service, which allows any existing Prey owners to register their game through Steam by entering the activation code, including those who bought Prey through Triton. The game is, however, no longer available for purchase through Steam.

== Technology ==
Although similar to competing services, the primary selling point of Triton was its "dynamic streaming" technology, which allows for games to be played before they have been completely downloaded - new content is sent to the client as it is needed. All games on the service required the user to be online to be able to play purchased games.
