= GameAgent =

Online store for macOS games

GameAgent was an online store, digital distribution platform, and information hub for macOS games. The platform is owned by Aspyr, while the e-commerce portion was handled by Digital River.

== History ==
Launched in 2008, GameAgent originated as a storefront and digital distribution platform specifically for games published by Aspyr. It sold titles both as digital downloads and as physical boxes and featured games on both the macOS and Microsoft Windows.

In November 2016, the service was discontinued.
