= GotFrag =

Esports website

- Website type: eSports news site
- Owner: ESEA League
- Creator: Lee Chen
- Commercial: Yes
- Launched: Spring 2002
- Current status: redirects to http://lpkane.com/

GotFrag was a website, founded in 2002, that covered daily events and news about e-Sports and professional video gaming. New York Post writer Michael Kane called GotFrag "the best source of gaming [information] for the hard-core community". The site provided gamers with a place to find information and current events about their favorite eSports teams and players. In 2007, GotFrag became a wholly owned subsidiary of Major League Gaming.

== History ==
When launched in 2002, GotFrag primarily provided coverage of professional Counter-Strike gaming. However, after the acquisition of other sites, GotFrag's coverage was expanded. In 2004, GotFrag released the second version of their website. Along with the launch of version 2, GotFrag announced their GotFrag Prime service. Prime provided paying viewers additional content, features, and benefits. In December 2004, GotFrag introduced GameSense, the first ever statistical database of professional players, providing an overview of professional gamers around the world with statistics and game records. In September 2006, GotFrag introduced its "GotComms" service which caters to Ventrilo and Teamspeak server rental.

On June 6, 2007, Major League Gaming acquired GotFrag for an undisclosed sum. GotFrag, which had historically focused on PC games, said it would remain committed to covering the platform as well as increasing coverage of console eSports.

In January 2015, after a long period of relative inactivity, the URL to GotFrag began redirecting users to the ESEA League website. This has increased speculation that GotFrag has officially been shut down.

As of November 20, 2015, the GotFrag domain simply redirects to lpkane.com, one of the former owners of ESEA.
