= UK Resistance =

British video game website

UK Resistance (also written as UK:Resistance, or simply UK:R) was a video games website founded in 1996 by Gary Cutlack and Jon M (under the pseudonyms Commander Zorg and Captain Jax). Originally a Sega news and reviews fansite, UK Resistance expanded its coverage across all formats, and developed a style depending more on satirical updates rather than its original UK news and reviews content. The site officially closed on March 29, 2011

== Reception ==
The website is frequently referenced by games industry media, and its exposure led to a writer's position at Sega Saturn Magazine for Gary Cutlack. The website has been described by Edge as the place where "Europe's Sega cognoscenti gathered to discuss the burning issues of the day", and by Wired gaming blog as "the popular taking-on-the-industry slam page". The site was often linked to from other gaming blogs such as Kotaku and Joystiq.

== Campaigns ==
Notable updates from the website include the Blue Sky in Games campaign, a campaign to reintroduce light hearted environments and settings into video games, as opposed to the prevalence of "realistic" gang violence games such as Saints Row. As UK Resistance themselves put it, "We want to play in a HAPPY PRETEND LAND, not a shit version of an American slum full of mixed-race gangsters wearing licensed sportswear!". The campaign was picked up by websites such as Eurogamer, who gave it their full backing, and PC Zone, who called the campaign "a just cause... that we heartily endorse".

== Acquisition ==
UK Resistance was acquired by Shiny Media in June 2007, before being returned to the sole ownership of Cutlack in June 2008 in lieu of money owed to him by Shiny. In October 2007, UK Resistance was voted Best Non-Commercial Website or Blog at the inaugural Games Media Awards held at the Soho Revue Bar in London. Cutlack was also nominated for Best Writer In Specialist Media at the same event.

== See also ==
- Games Domain
