= My Famicase =

Japanese art show

My Famicase Exhibition
- Status: Active
- Location(s): Tokyo
- Country: Japan
- Founded: 2005
- Organized by: METEOR
- Website: famicase.com

The My Famicase Exhibition (Japanese: わたしのファミカセ展) is an annual art show of fan-made Nintendo Famicom cartridge designs hosted by METEOR, an art gallery based in Tokyo, Japan. The exhibition celebrated its 17th anniversary in 2021.

Since 2015, website Itch.io has hosted a game development competition based on "My Famicase Exhibition" submissions.

In November 2021, the show was brought to Hong Kong under the name "My Famicase Exhibition Hong Kong". It is their first event outside of Japan. All 253 works from the 2021 submissions were exhibited, visitors could also vote for their favorite "Famicase" just like in Japan.

In July 2022, the show was also brought to Los Angeles, CA under the name "My Famicase Exhibition - LA", hosted by CAPSULE CORNER a Los Angeles based gallery & gachapon booth.

== Winners ==
- 2006 2g "Family Watch"
- 2007 テクノタク飯塚 XHTC "R.O.B.のスカートめくり"
- 2008 ババカオリ "集会"
- 2009 KOKOSAC "METEOR 探偵俱樂部"
- 2010 荒井期一 "カイロ"
- 2011 ナツミ "非常用電灯"
- 2012 kamonegi "接待ゴルフ"
- 2013 Vittorio Giorgi "2分ぐらい、待っててね<3"
- 2014 ツモリ "ぎょう虫検査カートリッジ"
- 2015 U井 "シティコンポ turbo"
- 2016 Machikoudonco "王将"
- 2017 赤うさ D "リモコン"
- 2018 タナゴチームタナゴ "インスタクエスト 承認欲求の神々"
- 2019 MATSUMO "和熙村"
- 2020 マルアン商会 "ロースハム(スライスハム)"
- 2021 雨の日グラフィックス "すぐ死ぬゲーム"
- 2022 ヒラオカユウキ "モルック"
- 2023 José Salot "Donna's RC Workshop"
