= Poki (website) =

Dutch video game website

- Website type: Browser gaming website
- Founded: 2014
- Country of origin: Netherlands
- Owner: Poki B.V.
- Founders: Sebastiaan Moeys; Michiel van Amerongen
- Industry: Video game industry
- Website: poki.com
- Commercial: Yes
- Registration: Optional
- Current status: Active

Poki is a Dutch browser game website operated by Poki B.V., an online video game company based in Amsterdam. The company was founded in 2014 by Sebastiaan Moeys and Michiel van Amerongen and distributes free-to-play HTML5 games through Poki.com.

== History ==
Poki was founded in 2014 in Amsterdam by Sebastiaan Moeys and Michiel van Amerongen, who had met as students at the University of Amsterdam. The company focused on browser-based distribution during the transition from Adobe Flash to HTML5, while much of the games industry was moving toward app store distribution.

In 2020, Poki partnered with British indie studio Nitrome to convert classic Flash-era games to HTML5 as browser support for Flash was being phased out.

In November 2025, Bloomberg reported that Poki had reached approximately 100 million monthly active users. MCV/Develop reported that data from Ahrefs estimated Poki.com received approximately 122.5 million monthly visits, representing an increase of approximately 569% over the previous five years.

Poki's website received the Red Dot Design Award in Brands & Communication Design in 2018 and a Webby Award for Company Website in 2019. In 2025, Poki received the Best in Business award at the Dutch Game Awards.

== Platform and business model ==
Poki operates a browser-based gaming platform hosting HTML5 games accessible on desktop, tablet and mobile devices without installation. Funded by advertising, the platform offers thousands of free browser games, and does not require registration.

Bloomberg reported that Poki charges developers more than the 30% fee typical of app stores, but helps developers connect their games with users and generate revenue.

== Reception ==
Reviewing Poki for Common Sense Media, Erin Brereton noted that the site was not designed specifically for children. She claimed the quality of games could be inconsistent and that the amount of violent content varied from game to game, and remarked that some games encouraged critical thinking and logical reasoning. She concluded that "only older gamers should take a look with parental guidance".
