= GameZombie =

- Website type: Game Media Studio
- Creator: Spencer Striker
- Website: http://www.gamezombie.tv/
- Launched: 2007
- Current status: Active

GameZombie TV is a web series that produces original video game shows. GameZombie was the recipient of a Webby Honoree Award for Online Video in 2008 and 2009, a Davey Award, a Webby Award, and a People's Voice Webby Award in 2010, and nominated a finalist for Best Web Video at the 4th Annual Mashable Awards. The student-run game media studio, based out of the University of Wisconsin at Whitewater and Indiana University at Bloomington, has amassed one of the most complete video game developer interview series on the web. GameZombie has created upwards of 450 videos for online distribution. GameZombie's videos have amassed over 8,000,000 unique, aggregate views since the company's first video went online in March 2007. GameZombie TV's constructivist, project-based learning environment is a finalist for the MacArthur Foundation's 4th Annual Digital Media and Learning Competition

== History ==
GameZombie was started by Spencer Striker in March 2007 while he was a graduate student in Indiana University’s Masters in Immersive Mediated Environments program. When based in Bloomington, Indiana, GameZombie became the city's largest employer of student interns. Around 50 to 60 students between the two universities take GameZombie for academic credit each semester in order to gain experience in a multimedia studio.

== Original Video Series ==
=== Developer Interview Series ===
GameZombie’s video game developer interview series includes over 200 video interviews with notable game developers, video game personalities, and makers of gaming peripherals.

GameZombie's annual gaming conference coverage includes the Electronic Entertainment Expo, the Game Developers Conference, the Penny Arcade Expo, Gen Con, Comic-Con, and the World Series of Video Games. Series interviews include: Peter Molyneux of 'Fable 2,' Ed Boon of 'MK vs DC,' Todd Howard of 'Fallout 3,' Ben Mattes of 'Prince of Persia,' Cliff Bleszinski of 'Gears of War 2,' Eric Holmes of 'Prototype,' Clint Hocking of 'Far Cry 2,' Evan Wells of 'Uncharted 2,' Neill Glancy of 'Stranglehold,' Chuck Beaver of 'Dead Space,' Fatal1ty (pro gamer), The Angry Video Game Nerd (gaming critic), Geoff Keighley (gaming host), Al Alcorn (co-creator of Pong), Ralph Baer ('inventor' of video games), Tommy Tallarico of 'Video Games Live,' and Jane McGonigal of 'I Love Bees.'

=== ButtonMashers ===
ButtonMashers, a live studio production, was shot in a $2.5 million HDTV studio at Indiana University. The 14 episodes produced over two seasons featured the collaboration of hundreds of students and accumulated millions of views around the web.

=== Ultimate Challenge ===
GameZombie's 'Ultimate Challenge' is a motion graphics based original web series where three college aged gamers get trapped inside a fictional NES game. Over the course of six episodes the main characters encounter slime monsters, princesses, and boss battles.

== Sources ==
- GameZombie.tv - Videogame Reviews | Visit gamezombie.tv, KillerStartups.com, September 1, 2008
- Gamers become Zombies; win Webby Award Telecomment, Vol. 18, Fall 2008
- GameZombie has put B-town on the Web-Tech Map Bloom Mag, June/July 2009, (business/finance, pg 68); Szymanski, Zak
- I4U News Interview: GameZombie GDC, March 16, 2007
- Technology's role is all games in Bloomington's creative class, the Bloomington Source, May 7, 2009; Casady, Danny
- IU Students Up For a Webby Award, Inside Indiana Business, May 14, 2009
- GameZombie TV continues development at UW-Whitewater, Marketing & Media Relations, University of Wisconsin at Whitewater, October 15, 2009
- Web series project offers real-life experience to UW-W students, GazetteXtra.com, Kayla Bunge, October 30, 2009
- New class allows students to work in video game industry, Royal Purple, Matt Gardner, November 11, 2009
- UW-Whitewater rolls dice on new gaming major, Royal Purple, Rob Gauler, December 9, 2009
- Votes needed to win people's voice award, Marketing & Media Relations, University of Wisconsin at Whitewater, April 16, 2010
- UW-W student group could win Webby Award, BizTimes.com, April 22, 2010
- IU Office of Scholarships, GameZombie.tv honored with Webby Awards, IU News Room, Sarah Booher, April 19, 2010
- GameZombie TV sweeps Webby Awards in Student category, Marketing & Media Relations, University of Wisconsin at Whitewater, May 5, 2010
- Student-run GameZombie TV named best Web video finalist, Marketing & Media Relations, University of Wisconsin at Whitewater, December 9, 2010
- GameZombie.tv continues expanding, Royal Purple, Ben Holzhueter, September 21, 2011
- Picking the Brains of GameZombie TV, Video Game Writers, Daniel Wise, May 11, 2011
