= Awomo =

German online game distributor

AWOMO
- Developer: Game Domain International Plc
- Operating system: Windows
- Available in: English, German
- Type: Digital distribution
- Website: awomo.com

AWOMO is a Germany-based internet game distribution and delivery system, first developed by Game Domain International Plc. and completed by GDC Game and Download Company AG, Düsseldorf, Germany. AWOMO claims to deliver online game content in drastically shorter times than rival download services by allowing users to play games before they are fully downloaded. AWOMO also optimizes which parts are downloaded first based on usage statistics from other users. It looked likely to be a viable rival to Steam, but seems to have been given up in 2015 as shown by the internet archive. Steam, a similar pay-to-play game site, which originally envisioned a similar streaming-style content delivery mechanism, but abandoned it in favour of permanent local storage.

The website is no longer available, and it's up for sale due to an unknown reason.

== History of AWOMO ==
In February 2007 Richard Branson announced that Virgin_Group and Game Domain International Plc started developing a download platform for games called "A World Of My Own" (AWOMO).

On 29 December 2010, AWOMO was completely redesigned as GDC Game and Download Company AG, Germany became the new operator. Nils Herrnberger, the chief executive officer of GDC AG, was quoted saying: "It will accelerate time-to-play massively, giving gamers a whole new experience." Nils also stated that they would aim to offer five new games every month.

On 29 January 2011, the German version of AWOMO was started.

On 7 March 2011, GDC Game and Download Company AG made a convincing debut at Game Connection in San Francisco. As a result, some of the publishers in attendance agreed to work with them.

== The AWOMO platform - technical overview ==
The technology behind AWOMO is based on the principle that a player does not need to hold all of the game data locally in order to run and start playing the game. Instead, when the user logs into AWOMO, the server checks the reliable connection speed between server and user. It then calculates the smallest possible 'stub' of data that will enable the player to launch the game and continue playing with no interruption, with the rest of the data downloading as a background task.

This technique was employed by Exent, Triton, and Steam, but has been largely abandoned.

AWOMO issued a press release which claims that Quality and Assurance teams prepare the games for delivery on its platform by generating sets of 'data-time' maps. A neural network subsequently analyses these maps to calculate the most efficient way to deliver the data to a gamer at a given connection speed.

AWOMO also intends to provide a "rent-to-own" system, where the user can rent a game for a set period of time, and at the end of said time, the game becomes theirs.

== AWOMO compared to conventional downloads ==
The following chart details the increase of speed when AWOMO's method of downloading is used rather than conventional downloading. It is based on published information about Rome: Total War.

Rate	AWOMO	Common method
16 Mbit/s	5 Mins	27 Mins
8 Mbit/s	11 Mins	54 Mins
4 Mbit/s	22 Mins	108 Mins

== See also ==
- Digital Distribution
