= Sarcastic Gamer =

Sarcastic Gamer, LLC
- Website type: Video Gaming Blog/Podcast/Community
- Available in: English
- Owners: Jeromy "Doc" Adams; Adrian "Lono" Cherikos; David "Dave" Cothran
- Commercial: No
- Launched: 11 June 2007
- Current status: Inactive

SarcasticGamer.com was an independent video gaming blog and community site that was relaunched as a podcast. As part of the GamerCast Network, a community of independent podcasters, the website focused on parodying the latest events happening in the gaming industry. Although the website was best known for its satirical news articles and parodies, it also featured reviews, news, opinions and rants. All articles, however, stayed true to the "sarcastic" ethos of the site. Sarcastic Gamer was relaunched as a podcast-only website in December 2012 before closing its site in 2015.

== History ==
The site was founded by Adams in early June 2007, the first SarcasticGamer.com article, written on 11 June 2007 after his first parody song, "How You Killed Your Brand" (a parody of How To Save A Life by The Fray) gained immense popularity on YouTube.

As the popularity of the parodies and, consequently, the website increased, Adams needed to find reliable writers who could help him satisfy the growing demand for new material. The first to be approached was Sean "Rothbart" Workman, a trusted GamerCast Network forums member, who agreed to start preparing new articles for Sarcastic Gamer. Shortly thereafter, Matt "Volkov" Schmidt offered his help with the blog. Adrian "Lono" Cherikos, who had met with Adams on Xbox Live a few months before Sarcastic Gamer was created, started writing for the site after his debut on the Sarcastic Gamer Podcast on July 13, 2007. Adams also recruited his friend David Cothran, who stars on the podcast with him and helps him edit the podcasts.

With the site traffic increasing daily towards the end of 2007, more writers were required, leading to the recruitment of Alex "SupaSlick" Shaw and Anthony "Yousty" Youst in September, along with Eric "PacManPolarBear" Ross, who joined the staff in October 2007. Writer Matthew "Animathias" Schramm and cartoonist Tim "MightyMutt" Hibbs joined Sarcastic Gamer in early 2008. Jon "Yamster" Brady and Alex "RaiseHavok" Saunders were recruited as writers and in June 2008 and Ben "Eoco" Simmons joined the staff a month later.

The same increases in traffic that necessitated the extra staff were the impetus behind the shifting of the site, in early 2008, from its original host service, Blogger, to its present self-hosting state with WordPress.

Since the site is non-commercial, the staff rarely takes part in non-essential gaming events and gatherings. The first event the Sarcastic Gamer writers participated in was QuakeCon 2007, whilst the second one was Kane and Lynch Community Day. In July 2008, Jeromy Adams and David Cothran were able to receive E3 passes and attended the gaming convention and have since attended QuakeCon in 2008, the Penny Arcade Expo (PAX) in 2008, The Godfather Part II Community Day and the Computer and Electronics Show (CES) in 2009. Aside from conventions, Jeromy Adams and Adrian Cherikos were invited by Microsoft in December 2007 to see the forthcoming device under development by the company, Microsoft Surface, thanks to the video parody of the device created by Adams.

On April 6, 2009, Adrian "Lono" Cherikos announced his official departure from the Red Show and from his position as editor of the SarcasticGamer.com Blog, following a dispute of creative differences between the co-owners of the website. Following his departure, Yamster and Eoco replaced him in editorial positions and they selected six new writers under the pseudonyms of "DogsDieInHotCars", "O(ld)M(arried)G(amer)", "Krelith", "ShanghaiSix", "PillowFort" and "Monstar". Even more new faces: "Darkwonders", "Esmeralda" and "Lord Drattigan" have joined the writing staff since then. Starting with the Penny Arcade Expo on September 4, 2009, Cherikos resumed his writing and podcasting duties for Sarcastic Gamer, while continuing to support Achievement Hunter with his show, Respawn Radio with 8BitBass and Knuckles Dawson. Respawn Radio joined the Sarcastic Gamer Network on March 3, 2010, after a dispute between Knuckles Dawson, a former cohost and Lono. Lono subsequently dropped Knuckles from the show and moved it to Sarcastic Gamer, with Keadin joining as the 3rd chair. On April 5, 2010, Rothbart stepped down as community manager for Sarcastic Gamer, but he continues to do the PlayStation Podcast. Rothbart's role as community manager was replaced by site webmaster "regua".

In early December, 2011, regular content publication ceased and issues with Lono were cited as the cause. Each writer then posted a "farewell article", followed by an official announcement that all current writers, with the exception of Lono, intended to leave the site. Podcasts are still being produced until a new home is found for them. In early 2012 the SG Podcasters have officially announced that they have all moved to BigRedBarrel.com. They have said that all the active podcasts from SG will be transferring and future content will be posted on the new site.

On December 27, 2012, Adrian "Lono" Cherikos announced on his Twitter feed that Sarcastic Gamer had relaunched as a collaboration between him and founder Jeromy "Doc" Adams. The inaugural podcast's new intro said that the podcast would be published "on a semi-regular basis". However, the site's relaunch has been limited to just the podcasts, as the message boards and articles no longer exist. As of 2016, nothing related to SarcasticGamer.com is active anymore.

== Podcasts ==
=== Sarcastic Gamer Podcast (The Red Show) ===
Sarcastic Gamer Podcast (The Red Show)
- Genre: Video gaming
- Language: English

Cast and voices
- Hosted by: Doc, Lono

Production
- Production: Doc, Lono
- Length: 30-40 minutes

Technical specifications
- Audio format: MP3

Publication
- Original release: June 28, 2007
- Provider: Sarcastic Gamer, LLC
- Updates: Semi-regular basis

Related
- Website: http://sarcasticgamer.com/wp/index.php/category/sarcastic-gamer/podcast/sgp

The first Sarcastic Gamer Podcast episode was released on June 28, 2007 and was hosted by Doc, Dave and Drew, who left Sarcastic Gamer after Episode 6 of the podcast. As the podcast was gaining popularity, more people joined as the hosts; on July 13, 2007, the second show was released with Lono, the new staff member, joining the trio. On August 24, 2007 Sarcastic Gamer joined the GamerCast Network, opening the show to a wider audience. On September 24, 2007, as the 9th episode was aired, Alex Shaw became a co-host. During the 30 minute show, the hosts discussed and argued about recent video gaming news in an entertaining and friendly way. There have been four longer specials, including episodes 10, 20 (each 45-minute long), 21 (60-minute long) and 100 (55-minutes). In addition, the crew tries to plan a live, special show for each convention they attend.

The show was referred to as the "Red Show", because of how the podcast is synonymous with the site's logo and its importance over the different SG podcasts. The show, besides the usual podcast content, featured "Sarcastic Gamer news updates" in which fake news published on the main site is read out by Paul Christy, assisted by pre-recorded clips of one of the hosts (usually Adams) performing a role in the sketch.

The "Red Show" unexpectedly ended after completing 80 episodes, when Adrian "Lono" Cherikos left the Red Show due to feeling distant from the staff on the show and likely, some more undisclosed circumstances. Following this, the other two remaining hosts retired the "Red Show," but still continued to produce podcasts for the website.

The Red Show continued production on 4 September 2009 when Doc and Dave announced the cancellation of Sarcastic Gamer Radio at the FOX Sports Club in Seattle, WA and the continuing of the original podcast with Lono.

On Friday 5 February 2010, the Red Show officially reached its 100th episode. The show is frequently featured among iTunes podcasts, highly reviewed and subscribed and updated almost every Wednesday. On 20 September 2011, the Red Show officially ended their broadcast for personal reasons.

On December 27, 2012, Adrian "Lono" Cherikos announced on his Twitter feed that Sarcastic Gamer had relaunched as a collaboration between him and founder Jeromy "Doc" Adams. The inaugural podcast's new intro said that the podcast would be published "on a semi-regular basis".

=== Retired Podcasts ===
==== Sarcastic Gamer PlayStation Podcast (The Blu Show) ====
Sarcastic Gamer PlayStation Podcast (The Blu Show)
- Genre: Video gaming
- Language: English

Cast and voices
- Hosted by: Rothbart, PacManPolarBear, Frawlz

Production
- Production: David Cothran
- Length: 35-45 minutes

Technical specifications
- Audio format: MP3

Publication
- Original release: May 2008 – Nov 1st, 2012
- Provider: Sarcastic Gamer, LLC
- Updates: Fridays

Related
- Website: http://sarcasticgamer.com/wp/index.php/category/sarcastic-gamer/podcast/sg-psp

Part of Sarcastic Gamers effort to broaden its influence in gaming podcasts and PlayStation owner appeal, the PlayStation Podcast was launched in May 2008, becoming the third show to be launched in the Sarcastic Gamer Podcast lineup. About the same length as its predecessor (30-40 min), the so-called "Blu Show" is hosted by Sean "Rothbart" Workman, Eric "PacManPolarBear" Ross and Joseph "Frawlz" Frawley. The podcast, released every Friday, deals with matters relating to Sony and its gaming range. As the show grew more popular and its hosts more seasoned, it grew to be notorious among the staff and listeners for greatly surpassing its self-imposed runtime of 30 minutes, low-brow humor of the male anatomy and idiosyncratic segments in the show. PacMan is famous for his 'weees' to preface the GamerCast Network bumpers and referencing "Crazy Sony Quotes" in shows. Rothbart has become infamous for his biting humor, co-host deprecation and Frawlz frequently mentions grotesque bodily functions and his "love" for PlayStation home. PacMan and Rothbart have criticized Frawlz in jest for not playing games, just as Frawlz and Rothbart accused PacMan of not owning PlayStation 3 until he connected it to the internet and having a thing for BBWs.

Wagers among the staff of the podcast have also been prevalent. Frawlz wagered to Rothbart that the first six months of Killzone 2 sales would outnumber the sales of LittleBigPlanet in its first six months. The loser was required to purchase a SUMOlounge Omni for the winner, as SUMOlounge was a sponsor of Sarcastic Gamer at the time. The wager lasted until the summer of 2009, where Rothbart was declared the winner, with LBP outselling KZ2. On May 28, Frawls announced the shipping of a Green Sumo and the first age of Blu came to a conclusion. Since leaving Sarcastic Gamer, the show relaunched under the banner of the Blu show: The BRB PlayStation Podcast until its final episode in 2013. The show was proud to end its surprisingly long 200-episode run completely on its own terms. By all accounts, the show shouldn't have worked but when the show ended, it had consistently been rated in the top 3 PlayStation-centric podcasts on iTunes for years.

==== Sarcastic Gamer Pink (The Pink Show) ====
Sarcastic Gamer Pink (The Pink Show)
- Genre: Video gaming
- Language: English

Cast and voices
- Hosted by: Harlequin, Jax, Esme

Production
- Production: Dave
- Length: 30-40 minutes

Technical specifications
- Audio format: MP3

Publication
- Original release: October 2008 – July 2011
- Provider: Sarcastic Gamer, LLC
- Updates: Thursday

Related
- Website: http://sarcasticgamer.com/wp/index.php/category/sarcastic-gamer/podcast/pink

SG Pink caters to female gamers. hosted by Harlequin, JaXboxChick77 and Lesley, the podcast covers issues relevant to games and gaming from a female point of view. Launched in October 2008, it is typically released weekly on Thursdays, slotting in before the Sarcastic Gamer PlayStation Podcast and after the Sarcastic Gamer Podcast/Red. It is the fourth podcast to be an official Sarcastic Gamer production.

Harlequin left hosting duties for the show on 14 August 2009, leaving Lesley and Jax to elect a successor through a series of auditions and try-outs. These auditions resulted in Harlequin's return to take up her regular role as the show's main host.

As of 15 April 2010, Esmeralda replaced Lesley as a host on the show, bringing a youthful/re-energizing kick to the show's growing success. She helped integrate more hardcore gaming to the show as well as more PS3 news; something the show lacked before. Harlequin stepped down from the show yet again on 16 April 2011, this time permanently. She remained the show's executive producer while Quinstar took up her new role as an SG Pink podcaster. The girls recorded their last episode on 17 July 2011, officially ending the show.

==== Sarcastic Gamer Brown (The Brown Show) ====
Sarcastic Gamer Brown (The Brown Show)
- Genre: Video gaming
- Language: English

Cast and voices
- Hosted by: DogsDie, SmellyPirate, SaintMantooth, Yoshifett

Production
- Production: Dave
- Length: 30-40 minutes

Technical specifications
- Audio format: MP3

Publication
- Original release: November 23, 2009
- Provider: Sarcastic Gamer, LLC
- Updates: Mondays

Related
- Website: http://sarcasticgamer.com/wp/index.php/category/sarcastic-gamer/podcast/hud

The Brown Show, the sixth official Sarcastic Gamer podcast, began on November 23, 2009. The founder, Doc Adams, swapped the air dates of the Red Show and the then-Hump-Day Update due to his busy real-life work schedule. The Hump-Day crew, now airing on Monday, decided to drop the Hump-Day Update title and continue on with "Sarcastic Gamer Brown," and added a fourth chair, Yoshifett, to the selection of co-hosts. This is currently the only SG podcast with 4 hosts. In this show, "live" discussions of gaming, pre-recorded parody songs and advice segments are aired. Since leaving Sarcastic Gamer, the show has relaunched under the banner of Big Red Barrel Boom.

==== Sarcastic Gamer's Respawn Radio ====
Sarcastic Gamer's Respawn Radio (SGRR)
- Genre: Video gaming
- Language: English

Cast and voices
- Hosted by: Lono, 8bitbass

Production
- Production: 8bitbass
- Length: 45-60 minutes

Technical specifications
- Audio format: MP3

Publication
- Original release: May 5, 2009
- Provider: Sarcastic Gamer, LLC
- Updates: Tuesday

Related
- Website: http://sarcasticgamer.com/wp/index.php/category/sarcastic-gamer/podcast/respawn-radio-podcast

Respawn Radio began on May 5, 2009 on AchievementHunter.com, a sister site of RoosterTeeth.com. Lono and 8bitbass hosted the show along with AchievementHunter.com staffer/vlogger Knuckles Dawson. The podcast remained on AchievementHunter.com until February 23, 2010 (Episode 43) when the relationship between Lono and Knuckles Dawson/RoosterTeeth broke down and Lono moved the podcast to SarcasticGamer.com.

Lono and 8bitbass then hosted "SGRR" with a rotating third chair and pre-recorded updates from CaptainAverage. Guest hosts for Respawn Radio have included Brown Show Host DogsDie, Pink Show Hosts Harlequin and Esmeralda, Blu Show Host PacManPolarBear and Website Graphic Designer UndeadDoG.

On January 29, 2011, the first show with guest host Keadin aired and he became a permanent fixture until episode 93. At this time, Lono refused to let 8BitBass release an episode Lono had not shown up to record. After further arguments, both 8BitBass and Keadin agreed to leave the show and formed the CGR Podcast with former Respawn Radio host Knuckles Dawson. The first episode of the CGR Podcast debuted on July 12, 2011. Respawn Radio returned with Lono and 8BitBass on a semi regular basis until 2014 when they honored Knuckles Dawson after he passed in May 2014. There has been no shows since. If t is currently no longer in production.

==== Sarcastic Gamer UK ====
Sarcastic Gamer UK (SGUK)
- Genre: Video gaming
- Language: English

Cast and voices
- Hosted by: CaptainAverage (Dan Gibbons), MightyMutt (Tim Hibbs), Yamster (Jon Brady)

Production
- Production: CaptainAverage / Yamster
- Length: 35 - 45 minutes

Technical specifications
- Audio format: MP3

Publication
- Original release: October 27, 2010
- Provider: Sarcastic Gamer, LLC
- Updates: Wednesday

Related
- Website: http://sarcasticgamer.com/wp/index.php/tag/sguk

Originally a SG Community Podcast known as 'On Her Majesty's Sarcastic Service', SGUK began as an official Sarcastic Gamer podcast on October 27, 2010. SGUK caters to the UK audience of Sarcastic Gamer - as many shows are US-centric and a considerable proportion of Sarcastic Gamer's audience originate from the UK, it was considered that it was only appropriate to offer a dedicated UK podcast in Sarcastic Gamer's lineup of shows. The show is currently hosted by CaptainAverage (originally of Respawn Radio), MightyMutt and Yamster and offers UK-focussed gaming news and discussion. The show consists of a number of regular segments - such as 'The Great British Debate' and 'Motion Control Watch' - in addition to the usual coverage of gaming news whilst wearing leotards.

SGUK debuted at the #1 spot on the iTunes UK Video Game podcast chart and has enjoyed consistently high chart rankings since its release. Since leaving Sarcastic Gamer, the show has relaunched under the banner of the Big Red Barrel UK Podcast.

==== Sarcastic Gamer Community Podcast ====
The Sarcastic Gamer Community Podcast is not a podcast, but an initiative designed to give the members of the Sarcastic Gamer Community (the forums) a chance to make their own podcast and have it featured on the site. Anyone who is a member of the SGC can record their own podcast and submit the finished product to the site. It will then be added to the SGCP iTunes feed, where it can be freely downloaded and listened to. The Community Podcast feed is operated by Sarcastic Gamer's Community Podcast Coordinator 8bitBass and is updated as often as there are new shows.

==== Sarcastic Gamer Radio ====
Sarcastic Gamer Radio was the "replacement" for the then-retired Red Show. The first episode was released on Monday, April 13, 2009 and was considered to be a "variety show" hosted by two people of the Former Red Show cast, Doc and Dave. It was considered to be more of a "spiritual successor" because of its far departure from the structure of the Red Show. It featured community-oriented content such as "15 Seconds of Fame", as well as game discussions and Sarcastic Gamer News. The show was retired on September 4, 2009 with the announcement of the Red Show's return at the FOX Sports Grill in Seattle, WA.

==== Hump-Day Update ====
Since January 23, 2008, the Sarcastic Gamer Podcast became a twice weekly podcast. Released on a Wednesday, the "Hump-Day Update" (or the Orange Show) was introduced to help the Red Show hosts deal with the weekly flood of gaming information. Usually a 10-15 minute overview of the events taking place in the video game world, the so-called "Orange Show" was first hosted by the staff on the Red Show.

Any Wednesday podcasts were put on hold indefinitely to coincide with the retirement of the Red Show and the departure of Lono on 6 April 2009. Doc and Dave, however, pursued a replacement internally with the community. On June 24, 2009 the show was replaced with a new crew consisting of DogsDieInHotCars, Smelly Pirate and Saint Mantooth and revamped to be a 30-minute-long show, consisting of its own news and features. All of these members were the crew of former The Panda Watch community podcast.

Due to scheduling conflicts, the Hump-Day Update switched days with the Red Show. Because having a Hump-Day show coming out on a Monday didn't make too much sense, they rechristened the show as The Brown Show. The Brown Show retained the previous hosts of the Hump-Day Update along with the added host, Yoshifett.

== Other features ==
Although the long-term success Sarcastic Gamer has experienced is earned largely from podcasts, other features are on the site that generate traffic from a diverse audience

=== Parody Songs ===
As it is primarily a parody and satire site, Sarcastic Gamer's parody songs form an important part of its appeal. Parodies include "How To Kill A Brand", "Halo 3 Hoedown", "Hey Mr. Thompson", "This Second Life", "Ring Of Fire", "PlayStation Has No Freaking Games", "I Hate This", "Wii Fat", "Silence Cliffy B" and "The Price Is Too High", parodying various songs by The Fray, Plain White T's and Johnny Cash, among others. The notoriety from these parodies has amassed millions of views on YouTube, hundreds of thousands of mp3 downloads and a featured video section on video game website IGN.

There are also video parodies, namely the Microsoft Surface, Wii Fit and Wii Music spoofs, which use original source videos with humorous voiceovers. They have been published on many other gaming, and non-gaming blogs and websites. The parodies were also aired on G4TV. This publicity has resulted in the parodies being downloaded and/or streamed more than 6 million times. Most of them were written and sung by Jeromy "Doc" Adams.

=== Fiction Friday ===
Fiction Friday on Sarcastic Gamer is a weekly feature every Friday when every article not tagged as "Non-Fiction" is fake. All important gaming related community news and events are covered (and often parodied) in the articles, as well as tagged as "Fake News" or "Fiction Friday".

=== The Top 100 Gaming Moments of the Year ===
Throughout December 2007 and 2008, Sarcastic Gamer's staff posted a list of the hundred most important gaming moments of the year 2007, including game releases, important quotes, significant company merges and breakups and SarcasticGamer.com related events.

=== Forums ===
The Sarcastic Gamer forum community forms an integral part of both the main site and the podcast. The competitions run by the site, while announced in the podcasts, can only be entered by registered users and only forum members can post and reply to threads. Not only do the forum discussions concern the Sarcastic Gamer site, but the users often talk about other aspects of gaming as well as topics not connected with video games. Currently, over 6,000 Community Members make up the Sarcastic Gamer Community (SGC).

At the time, the forums were moderated by four dedicated forum moderators Mike "Ala Douche" Sutton, Shane "86" Uzell, & Lilliana "DeadpoolSkye" Dawn, as well as select staff writers and podcasters. The forums and the main page are maintained by resident webmaster "regua".

=== App ===
Sarcastic Gamer has released an app on the iOS and Android platforms. All previous episodes of every podcast are available to stream or download (although these downloaded episodes can only be played on the app) and also provide 'bonus content'. This content usually consists of an extra few minutes of the podcast and occasionally a wallpaper for the users mobile device. The app is currently priced at £1.79 in the UK and $2.99 in the US.

=== Comics ===
A recent addition to the SG lineup, the weekly comic has fast become one of the most popular features of the site. The work of Tim 'MightyMutt' Hibbs, it follows the (fictional) adventures of the staff, as well as some community members. Launched on March 27, 2008, the comic primarily covers issues and events related to the Sarcastic Gamer Community (SGC). A prominent example was the much hyped COD4 Tournament against fellow GamerCast Network podcasters, Gamertag Radio. The artist-generated characters, known as "Sarcastic Smileys" or "Avatars" have become an integral part of the Sarcastic Gamer Community to the point where most users who receive one after MightyMutt selects them, will use them as their avatar on the forums.

== Events ==
Besides conventions, special podcasts or special blog coverage, a few special, site-specific events have happened over Sarcastic Gamer's young history. From rallying up national coverage to fight video game publishers to gaining a following in the fight against pediatric cancer, Sarcastic Gamer has experienced polarizing, moving events since its founding.

=== Boycott ===
After EA decided to make certain weapons exclusive content to players who paid extra with the release of and announced their decision to do so with Battlefield: Bad Company, Sarcastic Gamer urged fans and readers to boycott the game's release and cancel their preorders. Many websites from around the world got involved in or mentioned the boycott making it very popular among gamers and eventually reaching IGN which contacted Electronic Arts, the publisher of the game, causing it to finally cease the idea of paid weapons.

As a result of this, on April 9, 2008, Sarcastic Gamer announced that the goal of the boycott had been achieved and that the boycott was lifted.

=== First Birthday ===
A major event on the Sarcastic Gamer calendar, the first birthday of the site was celebrated around the world on Saturday, 14 June, with parties planned in various American cities - namely Chicago, IL, Houston, TX, New York, NY, Los Angeles - as well as London, United Kingdom and Ottawa, Ontario, Canada. There also were online celebrations held on Xbox LIVE and the PlayStation Network.

=== Extra Life 2008 ===
A charity effort to raise money for pediatric cancer, Extra Life was launched in 2008 by the owners of Sarcastic Gamer. Over 1600 participants played video games for 24 hours on October 16. The participants collected money from their sponsors who gave money per each hour played. Generally, some sponsors paid one dollar per hour, effectively donating 24 dollars. The average was approximately $3/hr. All of the money went to the Texas Children's Cancer Center. Extra Life raised $115,000 in 2008.

=== Extra Life 2009 ===
Extra Life 2009 was quite successful, with Sarcastic Gamer and all other participating communities raising over $170,000.

=== Extra Life 2010 ===
Extra Life 2010 was Sarcastic Gamer's biggest success till 2011, with everyone helping to raise over $451,000. Extra Life has also expanded to help local children hospitals, all around the world, with more than just pediatric cancer research.

=== Extra Life 2011 ===
Extra Life 2011 more than doubled the 2010 total to raise $1.1 million for 175 children's hospitals around the world. The event was played simultaneously on every continent except Antarctica.
