= Amazon Digital Software & Video Games =

Digital video game distribution service

- Developer: Amazon.com
- Initial release: 3 February 2009
- Platform: Microsoft Windows, PlayStation 3, PlayStation 4, Xbox One, Xbox Series X/S, Nintendo Switch
- Type: Content delivery
- Website: Video Games

Amazon Digital Software & Video Games is a digital video game distribution service owned by the international electronic commerce company Amazon.com.

== Timeline ==
The service was launched on 3 February 2009, as Amazon Digital Game Store, having 600+ game titles available for download at that time.

On 7 August 2013, it was launched in the United Kingdom.

On 12 November 2013, Amazon launched a digital PlayStation store. Those who own a PS3, PS Vita or PS4 game from Amazon and receive a code for use over the PlayStation Network.
