= Internet television in Australia =

Internet television in Australia is the digital distribution of movies and television content via the Internet. In Australia, internet television is provided by a number of generalist, subscription-based streaming service providers, in addition to several niche providers that focus on specific genres. Australia's five major free-to-air television networks also all offer catch up TV of previously broadcast content to watch via their webpages and apps, and a number of ISPs and other companies offer IPTV – the live streaming of television channels sourced from Australia and elsewhere.

A feature of Internet television is that a user can view live television or video on demand. Some distributors provide content as downloads, while other only allow streaming; the main difference being that with downloads the end-user must have storage capacity for the content on their device and must wait for the download to be completed before the content can be viewed, whereas streamed content can be viewed almost immediately, but is not stored for a later viewing.

Whether downloaded or streamed, video files over the Internet are sometimes metered in Australia, with ISPs setting download quotas which can limit the downloads that a subscriber can make without incurring additional costs. Many ISPs now also provide plans with unlimited downloads. Some ISPs offer downloads on a quota-free basis for partnered television services, which is also known as "unmetered" content.

== Catch up TV Services ==
Australia's five major free-to-air terrestrial television networks all offer catch up TV which enable viewers to stream previously broadcast content as well as the ability to live stream programs through their websites and applications. These catch up services use IP Address Geolocation to attempt to ensure only Australian users can view the content.

The names given by the free-to-air networks to their catch up services are:

- The Australian Broadcasting Corporation – ABC iview, which launched on 24 July 2008.
- The Special Broadcasting Service – SBS On Demand, which launched on 1 September 2011.
- The Seven Network – 7+, which launched on 27 November 2017.
- The Nine Network – 9Now, which launched on 27 January 2016.
- The Network 10 – 10, which launched on 29 September 2013.

The Freeview FV app and Freeview website also provide a listing of catch up television content offered by its members in their apps and websites.

== Streaming Services ==
The logo of Netflix – a major entrant to the Australian streaming market in 2015.

Australia has a number of over-the-top streaming video on demand providers, some of the larger ones being:

- Netflix – an American streaming service that expanded to Australia in 2015.
- Stan – an Australian streaming service that launched in 2015 as a joint venture between Nine Entertainment Co. and Fairfax Media (now entirely owned by the former).
- Disney+ – an American streaming service from a subsidiary of The Walt Disney Company.
- Apple TV+ – an American streaming service from Apple Inc. Apple also offers films and television shows for rental and purchase via the iTunes Australia Store and has done so since August 2008. Content is viewable on Windows or Mac devices as well as on the Apple TV, iPhones, iPads, compatible smart TVs & video capable iPods.
- Foxtel Now – an Australian streaming and catch up service by Foxtel, launched in 2009 to Foxtel subscribers under another name and then again to non-Foxtel subscribers in 2013.
- Amazon Prime Video – an American streaming service by Amazon.
- Kayo Sports – an Australian streaming service from a subsidiary of Foxtel, launched in 2018.
- Paramount+ – an American streaming service owned by a subsidiary of Paramount Skydance.
- BINGE – an Australian streaming service from a subsidiary of Foxtel, launched in 2020.
- AMC+ – an American streaming service from a subsidiary of AMC Networks, launched in 2022.
- HBO Max – an American streaming service from a subsidiary of Warner Bros. Discovery, launched in 2025.

Other streaming and download providers include:

- Beamafield
- BigPond Movies now also called "Telstra TV Box Office"
- Brollie – Streaming classic Australian movies and TV shows.
- Crunchyroll – an American streaming service focusing on anime.
- DocPlay
- HayU
- Love Nature
- YouTube Premium – an American streaming service, owned by Alphabet Inc., offering ad-free access to YouTube and original content.
- UFC Fight Pass – an American streaming service, owned by Ultimate Fighting Championship, focusing on mixed-martial arts.
- Hidive – an American streaming service focusing on anime.

A Screen Australia report found that in 2017 two out of three Australians who watch internet video were using a streaming video on demand service and that piracy was in decline among all video on demand users. In 2019, approximately 11.5 million Australians lived in a household with a Netflix subscription, and 2.9 million in a household with a Stan subscription.

== ISP & IPTV Services ==
Some Australian Internet service providers bundle internet television services with their broadband products. Sometimes these are IPTV services which allow the viewing of live television over internet protocol – although many of these services are accessible independently from ISPs.

=== Fetch TV ===
Fetch TV is an Australian IPTV provider that delivers a subscription television service over a user's regular internet service. It was launched in 2010, offering English and foreign-language pay-TV channels, some on-demand content and the functionality of a personal video recorder. ISP iiNet announced a partnership with Fetch TV in April 2010 to offer unmetered access to Fetch TV. Presently, as of 2020, Fetch TV has partnerships with a number of ISPs.

=== Telstra TV Box Office ===
In February 2006, Telstra launched Telstra TV Box Office, a video on demand service that allows both rentals and purchases. The service uses progressive download, which downloads a video while still allowing viewers to commence watching once enough of the video has been downloaded. The service is only available on Windows PCs, certain LG and Samsung devices as well as Telstra devices such as the 'Telstra TV'. Telstra TV Box Office (and Telstra TV) are available quota-free to some Telstra customers.

=== TPG IPTV ===
Some TPG customers can access, via IPTV, channels like Bloomberg TV, Al Jazeera, France 24 and Deutsche Welle. This is complimentary for eligible connections, and channels are sent unencrypted to be viewed on customer's computers. It is only available on select TPG ADSL2+ exchanges. TPG have signed a licence agreement to air Foxtel channels on their IPTV service in 2015.

=== FlipTV Australia ===
FlipTV is an IPTV company in Australia delivering worldwide content via the internet direct to TV.

=== MTEL Global/Move TV ===
MOVE TV is launched by MTEL Global worldwide, is designed for the Balkan diaspora in Australia and worldwide.

== Console Streaming ==
Certain video game consoles enable users to access internet television through install-able applications:

=== PlayStation ===
PlayStation launched a Video on Demand service called Video Unlimited in February 2010. This was subsequently rebranded to PlayStation Video and offers movies and television shows for rental or purchase on PlayStation 3, PlayStation 4 and PlayStation 5 consoles, Sony Bravia TVs, Sony Xperia mobile devices and Windows or Mac computers.

PlayStation also has partnerships with a variety of 3rd party video services and as of December 2022 offered access to Foxtel Now, Stan, Binge, Funimation and Australian TV catch-up services ABC iview, SBS on Demand, 10 Play, 7plus and 9Now as well as Netflix, Disney+, YouTube and other international services.

=== Xbox ===
Microsoft Australia launched a movie rental service in November 2009 for Xbox 360, Xbox One and Xbox Series X/S owners, via the Australian Zune Video Marketplace. Movies are available in standard or high definition, and can be streamed or downloaded. The service is now called Microsoft Films and TV.

== Regulation ==
Internet television in Australia is regulated by the Australian Federal Government, through its powers to regulate telecommunications and levy taxes, and through the laws of the Australian states and territories. In 2015, the Australian Government moved to make digital goods subject to the Goods and Services Tax.

Screen Australia and the Australian Communications and Media Authority proposed in 2020 the adoption of a new model of media regulation in Australia that would treat traditional, and more regulated, forms of media in similar ways to newer, and less regulated, forms of media. Options suggested included: imposing revenue-based quotas for local content production on streaming companies (as well as the entire sector); voluntary investment undertakings by streaming companies while maintaining the pre-existing quota system; or a relative deregulation of the media sector in its entirety.

== Defunct Services & Devices ==
A number of internet television services and the devices used to access these services have become defunct or are no longer supported in Australia:

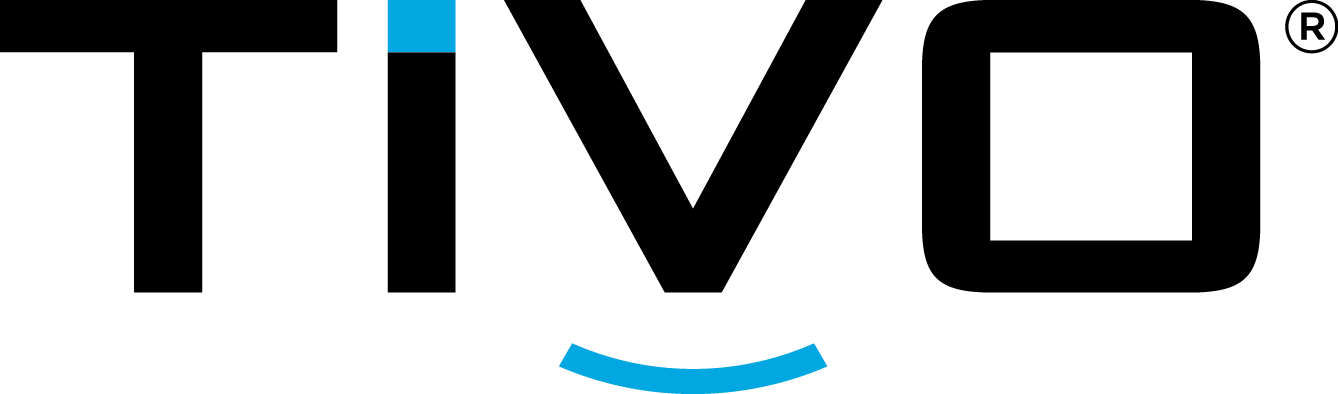
The logo of TiVo.

=== TiVo ===
TiVo is a digital video recorder for free-to-air television with Internet features. TiVo content is available quota-free by ISP's Internode, iiNet, iPrimus and Aussie Broadband. In December 2009, TiVo launched a new service for downloading TV shows and movies to TiVo subscribers, named CASPA. CASPA was discontinued in December 2013 and replaced with Quickflix, a third-party service.

=== T-Box ===
Telstra released "T-Box" in mid-2010, initially to Melbourne Bigpond cable customers. T-Box is a digital set-top box and personal video recorder with access to free-to-air TV channels and an ability to rent movies and TV episodes using Telstra home broadband. It can also access BigPond Internet TV channels and Telstra TV Box Office, as well as apps like YouTube. The T-Box is no longer available for sale, being replaced with Telstra TV; but existing T-Boxes continue to be functional.

=== Realtime.tv ===
The logo of the discontinued Presto service.

Reeltime.tv was setting up a movie rental service to its own set top boxes. It was placed in receivership in early 2008, and its purchased by EzyDVD assets to form their EzyDownload movie rental service. EzyDVD was placed into receivership at the end of 2008.

=== Presto ===
Presto was a Foxtel-owned Australian streaming service that launched in 2014 and ceased operations in 2017.

=== AnimeLab ===
Animelab logo

AnimeLab was an Australian streaming service focusing on Japanese anime series that launched on 28 May 2014 and ceased operations on 9 December 2021. Was rolled into Funimation after Funimation purchased AnimeLab.

=== Quickflix ===
Quickflix started offering an Internet streaming service in late 2011 until 2021. The service includes a limited number of television series.

=== Funimation ===
Funimation (formerly FunimationNow) was an American streaming service focused on Japanese anime. The service closed in April 2024 as it was merged into sister service Crunchyroll.

== See also ==
- Television in Australia
- Digital television in Australia
- Internet in Australia
- Australian Interactive Media Industry Association
- Subscription television in Australia
