= Hoyts Kiosk =

Australian movie rental company

- Type: Subsidiary
- Industry: Automated retail
- Founded: 2005
- Defunct: 2018
- Fate: Sold and rebranded
- Successor: Video Ezy Express
- Headquarters: Sydney
- Area served: Australia
- Key people: Andrew Evetts, Ian O'Rourke
- Parent: Hoyts

Hoyts Kiosk, previously known as Oovie, was an Australian company that specialised in the rental of DVDs and Blu-ray Discs via automated retail kiosks. In 2013, Hoyts Kiosk had over 500 kiosks in Australia, located in every state and territory except South Australia, with more than 250,000 active customers.

== History ==
Hoyts Kiosk was launched as Instant DVD by Sydney-based entrepreneurs Andrew Evetts and Ian O'Rourke in 2005. They were inspired by seeing the success of similar DVD rental kiosks in the United States. In October 2009 they sold the business to Hoyts who rebranded the company as Oovie.

In November 2017, Hoyts Kiosk was acquired by Video Ezy Express and all its machines were rebranded.

== Kiosks ==
Kiosks were located at grocery stores, shopping centres, convenience stores, and fast food restaurants. Customers could choose a DVD or Blu-ray disc at any kiosk, or select and reserve online for collection at a kiosk. Discs could be returned to any kiosk in Australia. Movies had to be returned by 9 pm the following day or a further day's rental was charged.

== See also ==
- DVD-by-mail
- Video rental shop
