= Movieland (retailer) =

Australian media press and online retail store

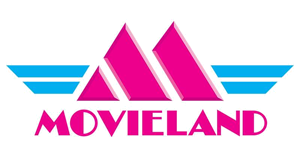
- Company type: Public
- Founded: 1982 (44 years ago); Melbourne
- Founder: Tony Romano, Paul Spano
- Headquarters: Adelaide, South Australia
- Number of locations: 145
- Services: Magazine, Podcast, Online Retail, Home video rentals (VHS, Betamax, LaserDisc, DVD, Ultra HD Blu-ray, Blu-ray)
- Website: www.movieland.au

Movieland is an Australian media promotion and online retail company, formerly a video store franchise founded by Tony Romano and Paul Spano in 1982, growing to 145 locations across Australia. The chain operated for 20 years before closing in 2002, with its first store opening in Bay Street, Brighton, Victoria, and its final location in Sandringham, a Bayside suburb. After its closure, many of the stores were rebranded as Video Ezy, and in some cases, Blockbuster. In 2021, Video Ezy ceased operations and liquidated its assets. In 2023, Movieland was revived as a media press and retail company, founded by Adam Heron and Shawn Montague in Adelaide, South Australia.

== History ==
Independent research has consistently highlighted Movieland as the most recognized movie retail franchise group in the Australian market. Founded in 1982, Movieland has evolved into a prominent, Australian-owned franchise, with a strong presence across Victoria, South Australia, and Western Australia. At its peak, the brand boasted over 145 stores, with 40 locations across both metropolitan and regional areas of Victoria alone.

The Movieland store in Victor Harbor, South Australia, earned the title of "Best Country Store of the Year" for two consecutive years, reinforcing Movieland's reputation as a leading video store franchise in regional areas.

== Final years and last remaining store ==
By the late 2010s, most Australian video rental chains had closed due to competition from online streaming services. One of the final stores associated with the original Movieland business operated in the Melbourne suburb of Sandringham, Victoria. The store originally opened as a Movieland outlet in 1994 following the success of the company’s Brighton location, before later operating under the Video Ezy and Network Video brands.

Despite industry decline, the Sandringham store continued trading until late 2019. Its longevity was attributed to an extensive catalogue that included foreign, arthouse, and hard-to-find films, as well as a strong emphasis on personalised customer service.

The store was owned by Movieland co-founder Paul Spano, who stated that the business had become marginally unprofitable in its final years but was kept open to support staff and serve the local community. The store ultimately closed in December 2019 following the expiration of its lease.
