= Reeltime =

Reeltime may refer to:

- Reeltime.tv, Australian broadband television operator
- Reeltime Pictures, British multimedia film and video production company
- ReelTime, a QuickTime-based video editing software developed by SuperMac Technology
- Reeltime (album)
