= The New Release =

- Industry: Retail/DVD rental
- Founded: 2002
- Defunct: 2009
- Fate: Acquired by NCR
- Headquarters: Houston, TX

The New Release was a company that owned and operated DVD rental kiosks. The company was based in Houston and was part of privately held TNR Entertainment Corp. TNR was acquired by NCR in 2009. NCR had in 2008 partnered with Blockbuster to establish a channel for kiosk DVD rentals, and TNR's acquisition furthered this aim. NCR's DVD kiosks were purchased by Redbox in 2012

TNR was backed by an institutional investor group including Celerity Partners, LP of Los Angeles; Chapton Partners, LP, a Houston family partnership; Laminar Direct Capital, L.P., a member of the D. E. Shaw group of companies and MCG Capital, a leading specialized financial services company and financial advisor.

Each of its interactive kiosks held up to 1,000 DVDs, including new releases and classic titles. To rent a movie, consumers swiped their credit card, make their selection and the machine then dispensed the movie(s). The charge per rental was $1 per day; and keeping a DVD more than 14 days was effectively the same as purchasing the DVD.

The kiosks were located at grocery stores including Albertson's, Dillon's, Kroger, Publix and others—and promotions included a “Movie Lover’s Survey,” “Movie For a Year” and a “First Movie Free.”

The company also operated kiosks under the name "moviecube," a California company which it acquired.

== History ==
Founded in 2002, The New Release focused primarily on the grocery channel. The first kiosks were installed in Houston, HEB locations, with later expansion into Dallas, Kroger locations. Acquired by NCR in 2009, its kiosks eventually became the property of Redbox when Redbox acquired all of NCR's DVD rental kiosks in 2012.

== Promotions ==
The New Release periodically created promotions to entice current consumers and attract new ones. The New Release held a “Movie Lover’s Survey,” where they gave away free movies to the first 500 respondents.

The New Release gave away “Movie For a Year” to 45 customers throughout North America.

In the past, The New Release produced a “First Movie Free” promotion in many of its locations nationwide.

== See also ==
- Online video rental
- Video store
