= Movieshack =

DVD Rental Company

Movieshack was an online DVD rental company in New Zealand. It was launched in June 2004 and subsequently merged with Fatso and DVD Unlimited.

== History ==
Based in Auckland, it was launched on 28 June 2004 and introduced commercial online DVD rentals to New Zealand. The company was founded by brothers James and Nick MacAvoy, who created the customised software systems and website.

A January 2007 story in The Herald on Sunday estimated the New Zealand online DVD rental market at 15000 subscribers, with the implication that Movieshack was the smallest of the three major online DVD rental companies (the others being Fatso and DVD Unlimited).

In June 2008, the company announced a merger with Fatso and DVD Unlimited. Screen Enterprises Limited was formed by merging the three businesses. According to the 2008 SKY Network Television annual report, the three firms were all struggling with the business model that has "yet to be accepted in New Zealand". SKY Network Television owns 51% of Screen Enterprises Limited and as such all subscribers were consolidated into SKY's results.

Movieshack completed the switch-over of its services in November 2008, when it switched its members to the new service which then operated under the Fatso name. This ceased to operate in 2017 because in turn it too became uneconomic.
