= Cinema Paradiso (company) =

UK-based DVD-by-mail company

- Type: Private company
- Industry: Electronic commerce
- Founded: 2003; 23 years ago
- Founder: Zoran Dugandzic
- Headquarters: Brentford, London, England, United Kingdom
- Area served: UK
- Products: Online DVD rental; Online Blu-ray
- Services: 80,000 titles. Extensive Worldwide library.
- Website: Cinema Paradiso

Cinema Paradiso is a UK-based DVD-by-mail company which specialises in world and arthouse cinema but also caters for mainstream tastes as well, with over 80,000 DVD titles and 5000+ Blu-ray high definition titles available. It operates a system which divides film information for each title by genre and special features on the disc. It also carries a list of over 5000 foreign language DVDs.

== History ==
Cinema Paradiso is a privately owned company, established in 2003 in Lewisham, South London and currently with its headquarters in Brentford, West London, England, UK. In 2005 the company bought Zoovies.net, and in the following year acquired DVDsToMe.

== Awards ==
- Won Ethical Consumer's best buy award in July 2013
