= Video City (Australia) =

Defunct Australian home video rental business

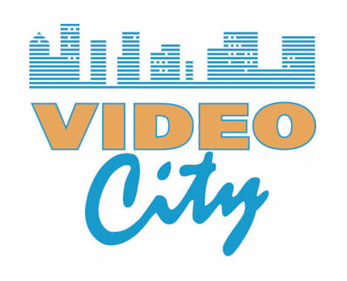
- Company type: Subsidiary
- Industry: Video rental
- Founded: 1982; 44 years ago
- Defunct: 2019
- Fate: Liquidation
- Headquarters: Hobart, Tasmania; Australia
- Area served: Australia
- Key people: Terrance Ewing (founder)
- Services: Home video rentals; (VHS; Betamax; LaserDisc; Video CD; DVD; Blu-ray; Ultra HD Blu-ray; console games)
- Parent: Classic Video Pty Ltd
- Website: Archived website

Video City was an Australian home video rental business that offered titles on VHS, DVD, Blu-ray and Ultra HD Blu-ray, as well as console video games, for rent. At its peak, Video City operated 26 stores nationally; 21 in Tasmania, with a further five stores located across Victoria and Queensland.

== History ==
The first Video City store was opened by founder Terrance "Terry" Ewing in Glenorchy, Tasmania in 1982. Due to the company's early market expansion across Tasmania, competition entry into the state was difficult, with only a handful of Video Ezy and Blockbuster Video stores ever opening on the island. Video City's stronghold in the Tasmanian market assured confidence, and the company expanded the franchise onto the Australian mainland, as well as opening the largest video store in Australia at New Town, Tasmania in 2002.

=== Decline ===
Video City's demise is largely attributed to the widespread use of illegal digital downloads and the adoption of online streaming services. The world-wide decline of the video rental shop began in the mid 2000s. The industry was initially affected by peer-to-peer file sharing networks such as Limewire and The Pirate Bay which facilitated the distribution of pirated digital video content, and later from the launch of streaming services including Netflix, Stan, ABC iview and SBS On Demand in Australia. As video distribution was a third party business operating brick and mortar stores, Video City, along with video rental businesses including Video Ezy and Blockbuster Video, were unable to shift their business model into the online sphere. The passing of founder Terrance Ewing in January 2015 is also attributed to the company's loss of direction. The Tasmanian Video City stores momentarily profited during the 2016 Tasmanian energy crisis, when the failure of Basslink caused prolonged internet outages across the island. However the renascence was short-lived and flagship stores began to cease trading; the Burnie location closed in 2017, followed by the Launceston store in 2018. After selling its catalogue of over 30,000 video titles, their final location at New Town closed in August 2019.

== Marketing ==
External videos
- Video City "Good Times" television commercial

Video City became well known in Tasmania for its distinctive sound branding used in both radio and television campaigns during the 1990s. Its memorable jingle, "Good Times", was developed by marketing agency Vision 2000 and closely resembled the 1989 hit "Good Thing" by Fine Young Cannibals.

== Incidents ==
In 1997, the New Norfolk store suffered from a $18,000 burglary and an armed robbery in 2001. Video City donated $4,800 to the Royal Tasmanian Botanical Gardens Trust in 2001 as a means to compensate overcharging customers GST in the previous year, in which 20,500 customers were overcharged 23 cents for video rentals. The Liquor, Hospitality and Miscellaneous Workers Union took Video City to the Federal Court of Australia in 2007 after two employees were wrongfully fired for refusing to sign individual contracts. The original Video City store in Glenorchy was robbed in March 2008 by two assailants.
