= Fatso (service) =

New Zealand media rental service

- Type: Public
- Industry: Electronic commerce
- Founded: 2004
- Founder: Rob Berman
- Defunct: November 2017; 9 years ago
- Headquarters: Auckland, New Zealand
- Products: Online DVD and video game rental
- Owner: SKY Network Television
- Website: Fatso.co.nz (archive)

Fatso was a New Zealand online DVD and video game rental service that mailed DVDs, Blu-ray discs and video games to customers around New Zealand.

Fatso was founded in 2004 and was based in Auckland. In 2011, Fatso offered over 27,000 titles to around 20,000 subscribers, and had a full-time staff of 25. This made it the largest such rental service in New Zealand. It was operated by SKY TV, which owned 51% of the enterprise.

In September 2017 it was announced that the service would cease to operate on 23 November 2017 due to low membership (fewer than 10,000), making the service uneconomical to run.

== History ==
Fatso was founded in 2004 by Rob Berman of Westside Media.

In 2008 it merged with competitors DVD Unlimited and Movieshack to form Screen Enterprises Limited, which operated a single service under the Fatso name. SKY TV (which operated DVD Unlimited) owned 51%, with Berman as general manager. The merger was reported as being due to the home delivered DVD market not being "big enough for the three of them."

In 2012 Fatso began offering video game rental, with a service known as "Games Club". It was operated in a different way to the DVD and Blu-ray rentals, with a daily charge per game.

In August 2013 Berman left Fatso, moving to Shop HQ, an e-commerce venture backed by The Warehouse. He retained his stake in Fatso.

== Services ==
=== DVD and Blu-ray rental ===
Fatso was founded as a DVD rental service, and then also began to offer Blu-ray rentals. Plans ranged from $9.95 a month for two DVDs (one at a time), to $37.99 a month for unlimited DVDs (three at a time). The service was the largest of its kind in the country, holding around 5% of the total DVD rental market in New Zealand. The service had no late fees or set return times.

=== Games Club ===
Games Club was Fatso's video game rental service, started in 2012. Unlike the DVD/Blu-ray service, there was a daily, as opposed to monthly, charge for each game. Games were available for PS4, Xbox One, PS3, Xbox 360, Wii U, PS2, Xbox, GameCube and Wii platforms, and prices ranged from 49c to $3.00.

Fatso used New Zealand Post to send rentals to customers, and return postage was covered by the subscription costs.
