= Quickflix =

Defunct Australian streaming company

- Type: Subsidiary
- Industry: Home entertainment
- Founded: 2003; 23 years ago
- Defunct: 2021; 5 years ago
- Fate: Liquidation
- Headquarters: Sydney, NSW, AUS
- Area served: Australia; New Zealand
- Key people: Stephen Langsford (founder)
- Products: Online DVD and Blu-ray Disc rental, internet streaming
- Parent: Karma Media Holdings
- Website: Quickflix.com.au

Quickflix was an Australian company that provided online DVD and Blu-ray Disc rental by mail as well as internet streaming of movies and television shows via online pay-per-view or subscription.

Initially established as an online disc rental company in 2003, Quickflix launched online movie downloads in 2006, and their streaming service in 2011. By June 2014 the company had more than 182,000 subscribers. Although the first major streaming service to operate in Australia, Quickflix quickly lost ground after much larger competitors entered the market, such as Netflix in 2015. The company entered voluntary administration in early 2016, but was relaunched later that year under new owners. After several more years of trading, Quickflix was wound up in September 2021.

== Services ==
=== Disc rental ===
The company provided a monthly flat-fee service for the rental of DVD and Blu-ray titles. Subscribers created an ordered list, referred to as their Quickflix Queue, of titles to rent. The discs are then delivered individually via Australia Post; the individual postage-paid envelopes would typically arrive within four days to most areas of Australia. Subscribers can keep the rented title for as long as desired, without any formal due dates and without accruing any late fees. However, there was a limit on the number of titles (a maximum of two, previously this was determined by subscription level) that each subscriber could have on loan simultaneously. To receive a new title, subscribers must mail a previously received disc back in the reply-paid envelope provided. Upon receipt of the disc, Quickflix would then ship the next available disc in the subscriber's queue (subscribers could also pre-notify the return of a disc online, thereby receiving the disc sooner).

=== Internet streaming ===
Quickflix streaming was available over a range of smart TVs, games consoles, Blu-ray players, desktops, laptops, mobiles, tablets and other devices. There were two tiers of content subscribers could access: a set library of movies (consisting of mostly older titles) that was included with a customer's subscription, and premium content (usually newer movies) that required an additional fee per title to watch. Consumers could also pay to watch individual premium titles without a streaming subscription. Prior to its relaunch in 2016, Quickflix also offered television series to stream, but after the relaunch their streaming library consisted exclusively of movies.

Throughout the years, Quickflix had made deals with Disney, NBC Universal, BBC Worldwide and Lionsgate to stream their content. HBO's 2012 investment in the company also gave Quickflix access to HBO's back catalogue of shows until 2015.

Customers could combine a streaming and disc rental subscription for a discount.

== History ==
Quickflix was founded by Bill Keech, Sam McDonagh and Stephen Langsford, who were joined by Simon Hodge shortly afterwards. The company's was launched in Perth, Western Australia in 2003, and Langsford and Hodge went on to become long-serving executives and directors. The company attracted prominent business figures Bruce Gordon, Lachlan Murdoch and Domenic Carosa as investors.

Quickflix was listed on the Australian Securities Exchange in 2005, but was delisted in 2017. In December 2005, Quickflix acquired rival company HomeScreen, a move that doubled the Quickflix customer base. In 2006, Quickflix launched movie downloads, competing against BigPond Movies. In April 2011, Quickflix announced the dispatch of their 10 millionth DVD, a copy of Shrek Forever After.

In July 2011, BigPond Movies revealed that it would discontinue its DVD-by-mail service, selling its library of 50,000 titles to Quickflix. In that same month Quickflix announced that it would launch a subscription video streaming service, initially on a selection of Sony's internet-connected devices, which launched on 27 October 2011. Quickflix streaming became available on PCs and Macintosh computers, and on the PlayStation 3 later that same year. In January 2012, Quickflix announced a deal that would bring the service to Samsung TVs, mobiles and tablets, with Microsoft signing a deal to make Quickflix streaming available on Xbox 360 consoles later that year. For a time, the Quickflix app was installed as a stock app on a number of Windows Phone devices.

In March 2012 Quickflix launched a streaming service in New Zealand. That same month, US premium TV network HBO, a division of global media giant Time Warner, invested $10 million in Quickflix for a strategic stake. However the following year saw the company suffer a temporary cash flow crisis that saw four of its six board members quit and its CEO depart.

By 2014, Quickflix was established as Australia's leading streaming service, and boasted more than 182,000 subscribers as of June of that year. However, facing stagnating subscriber numbers, it was announced on 21 July 2014 that Nine Entertainment had acquired all of HBO's shares in Quickflix, thus becoming Quickflix's major investor. Nine paid $1 million for HBO's shares, just 10% of what HBO paid. By the following year a number of streaming competitors had launched in Australia: Netflix, Presto and Stan, the latter a joint venture between major Quickflix shareholder Nine and Fairfax Media. With their entry, Quickflix began to haemorrhage subscribers.

On 26 April 2016, Quickflix Australia announced that the company had entered voluntary administration, appointing Ferrier Hodgson to oversee the process. Quickflix blamed the company's largest shareholder, Nine Entertainment, for the predicament, because it had refused to restructure the shares it had acquired from HBO, which would have enabled Quickflix to raise additional capital for investing in content and marketing to compete in an increasingly crowded market. According to the company, Nine would only accept the restructure in exchange for a multi-million dollar payment in cash, which the company did not have, or have Quickflix transfer its customers to Stan, which the company refused to do. Nine also blocked a prospective deal with rival Presto, and the company was also forced to abort the planned acquisition of an unnamed Chinese film and media company. It was reported that, in the five years to 2015, the company had posted net losses of more than $40 million in total.

On 4 October 2016, U.S.-based Karma Media Holdings acquired Quickflix. Quickflix was relaunched in December 2016, offering a revamped streaming subscription which included rental of up to four premium titles a month in addition to the set streaming library, and a renewed focus on new-release movies. However, Quickflix's streaming library saw increasingly limited updates in subsequent years, and the company's focus largely returned to offering disc rental by mail to a niche consumer base.

In May 2021, a winding up application by EnergyAustralia was lodged against the company. Quickflix was wound up by court order in September 2021.

== See also ==
- Internet television in Australia
- Subscription television in Australia
