= DVD Unlimited =

- Type: Subsidiary
- Industry: Video rental
- Founded: late 2003, merged into Fatso in 2008
- Founders: Don Webster; Sandy Webster
- Headquarters: Nelson (originally); Auckland (later), New Zealand
- Services: DVD-by-mail
- Owner: SKY Network Television

DVD Unlimited was a DVD-by-mail service based in Auckland, New Zealand. It was a wholly owned unit of SKY Network Television. It competed directly with Movieshack and Fatso.

DVD Unlimited was originally based in Nelson, and was created in late 2003 by Don and Sandy Webster, a couple who ran a traditional video store there. As health reasons prevented the normal operation of the video store, the couple created an online store modeled after Netflix. DVD Unlimited was subsequently purchased by SKY TV for an undisclosed sum and promptly formed an alliance with both Blockbuster (New Zealand) and the Telecom New Zealand XtraMSN portal.

In June 2008 the company announced a merger with former competitors Fatso and Movieshack. Screen Enterprises Limited was formed by merging the businesses of DVD Unlimited, Fatso and Movie Shack. According to the 2008 Sky TV annual report, the three firms were all struggling with the business model that has "yet to be accepted in New Zealand". SKY owns 51% of Screen Enterprises Limited and as such all subscribers are consolidated into SKY's results.

The company completed the switch-over of its services in November 2008, when it switched its members to the new service which operated under the Fatso name. Fatso itself closed down in November 2017 as it was uneconomic to run.
