= EzyDVD =

Australian home video retailer

- Type: Subsidiary
- Industry: Home video retail
- Founded: 1999
- Area served: Australia
- Key people: Jim Zavos (founder)
- Products: DVD, Blu-ray, Ultra HD Blu-ray discs
- Parent: The Kingston Group
- Website: ezydvd.com.au

EzyDVD is an Australian specialist home video retailer offering DVD, Blu-ray, and Ultra HD Blu-ray discs for purchase. In the mid-2000s the company had over 70 retail stores around Australia, but is now exclusively an online retailer.

== History ==
EzyDVD was founded in March 1999 by video rental store owner Jim Zavos in Adelaide, South Australia. The business began as a website that cost Zavos $3000 to set up, which by its second year in operation was making $3.5 million in sales. In 2000 EzyDVD opened its first brick and mortar store in Rundle Mall, and its first franchised store in Sydney in 2001. In the following years the company quickly grew to encompass over 70 company owned and franchised retail stores around Australia with the main headquarters and online distribution warehouse located in Adelaide.

In 2003 Brazin Limited, owner of Sanity music stores, acquired 50% of EzyDVD. A December 2006 Deloitte report valued Brazin's 50% share of EzyDVD at between $1.4 million and $1.9 million, indicating that the value of 100% of EzyDVD at that time was in the range of $2.8 million to $3.6 million. At some point after 2006 Jim Zavos returned to being the sole shareholder of the company. By 2007 the company was turning over $150 million a year, with online sales making up 15% of that.

In a July 2007 interview, Zavos revealed plans for a very substantial expansion of their brick and mortar outlets to commence that same year. The expansion was to be delivered by converting existing independent video rental stores into franchised EzyDVD stores; these stores would have combined both rental and DVD sales sections and be decked out in EzyDVD livery. In late September 2007, EzyDVD acquired a stake in ASX listed video on demand company ReelTime Media Ltd.

Following a slump in sales, in March 2008 EzyDVD announced it had appointed Barry Taylor as its new CEO, with Jim Zavos remaining involved with the company in a business development capacity. In July 2008, it was announced that Taylor had resigned and that a new CEO, Stefan Moro, had been appointed, who began closing a number of unprofitable outlets. That month the company also announced a movie download service called EzyDownload with an intended launch date of September 2008, building the platform with ReelTime's assets. However, by December 2008, EzyDVD entered into voluntary receivership due to the ongoing downturn in sales, large operating losses and debts of over $18 million.

In January 2009, EzyDVD was purchased by the Franchise Entertainment Group (FEG), the parent company of Video Ezy and Blockbuster Australia, who took on the brand name, online business, stock, plant and equipment, as well as the 11 remaining company-owned stores and extended franchise network of 25 stores. FEG intended to use the acquisition to expand their retail presence into major malls and shopping centres; soon after however, EzyDVD's head office, warehouse and distribution facility in Torrensville closed. In October 2010, Élan Media Partners, a company related to FEG, acquired the rights to operate EzyDVD's website and online business from the Franchise Entertainment Group, while FEG continued to oversee the brick and mortar stores. By October 2013 only 3 branded stores had remained in Launceston, Browns Plains and Elizabeth; the following years saw those remaining stores close down and the business returning to be a ecommerce/online retailer only.

In July 2017, EzyDVD and all associated rights to operate the EzyDVD website were sold to The Kingston Group, located on the Gold Coast.

== Business ==
=== EzyDVD website ===
The EzyDVD website claims to be Australia's largest online DVD store, as well as purportedly being recognised as Australia's #1 DVD destination. It has a large library of all genres of DVD, Ultra HD Blu-ray and Blu-ray Discs, and boasts the largest forthcoming release list of any online retailer. The site features new release information, a separate Ultra HD Blu-ray section, individual category pages, advance future release notification functionality, numerous specials, exclusive offers (including the company's Collector's Tin packaging), and regular "Beat the Bomb" time-limited specials.

=== EzyGames ===
In 2007 EzyDVD launched its online store, EzyGames. The site specialised in video games for PlayStation, PSP, PlayStation 2, PlayStation 3, Xbox 360, Wii, Nintendo DS, and Microsoft Windows. It also sold PlayStation, Xbox, and Nintendo consoles and accessories. EzyDVD customers could use the same user account for both sites.

The EzyGames site was closed in 2009 and video games became available to purchase from the EzyDVD site itself. As of February 2021 video games are no longer available for customers to buy on the EzyDVD website.
