= Reeltime.tv =

ReelTime Media Ltd
- Type: Public company (ASX: RMA), Stock exchange(s): ASX, ASX Classification = Media
- Industry: Entertainment
- Founded: 2006
- Headquarters: Melbourne
- Key people: Andrew Wilshire (CEO); Roland Kulen (CMO); Keith Cohen (CTO) board of directors Stephen Johnston; Frank Brown; Alistair MacKinlay; Jim Zavos
- Products: Downloading Motion Pictures, TV & Video Games. Online DVD, Video Games & CD sales
- Website: www.reeltime.tv

ReelTime Media Ltd or ReelTime.tv was an Internet-based Australian video on demand and electronic sell-through (or download to own) provider. It was founded in 2005 and went public in April 2006 with its service launched beta in November 2006, and fully commercial in February 2007.

ReelTime Infotainment, the main operating subsidiary of ReelTime Media, was placed into the hands of administrators on 11 February 2008. Its assets were purchased by EzyDVD to form the service EzyDownload. EzyDVD was later placed into receivership in December 2008

Reeltime Media Limited (ASX: RMA) now operates as group of companies in the Digital Media space. Reeltime is experiencing substantial growth with the ongoing acquisition of Digital Media businesses. This includes businesses operating in digital marketing, training and education, information technology, market research, online services, media and communications, mobile, and telecommunications industries.

== History ==
ReelTime.tv offered its service partnering with EzyDVD (see below), Yahoo!7 (the local subsidiary owned 50% by Yahoo! and 50% by the Seven network) and various Internet Service Providers.

ReelTime was an ISP independent broadband TV operator, and a licensed Australian telecommunications carrier and datacaster, the system that allows transfer of data via DVB-t digital television. It also held a broadcast license in Singapore. Reeltime provided product such as online games and DVD sales for overnight delivery, in addition to legal movie, TV episodes, music and games downloads to purchase or rent from their online store.

ReelTime Media was publicly listed, with Sony holding circa 8% of its issued shares/stock, plus options. As at 27 September 2007, its market capitalisation was some A$10m. An agreement was reached in late September 2007 with EzyDVD as part of a wide reaching strategic alliance, with EzyDVD taking a stake in the Company in exchange. An initial stake was purchased for cash by EzyDVD, with additional shares being allocated in 15 steps to EzyDVD as it increases ReelTimes revenues, acquires customers, performs marketing tasks, and reduces the operational cost base – whilst at the same time using its A$100m plus buying power with Hollywood & Independents to get more content deals.

In 2008 the company was placed in voluntary administration after a series of losses that caused the company to no longer be viable. The company remained dormant on the Australian Securities Exchange for the following 5 years having completed a deed of company arrangement in 2009.

In November 2012 the company entered into an agreement to purchase a small Australian digital marketing agency, PositionMEonline, and proceeded to acquire a series of other similar digital marketing businesses. In March 2014 its chief operating officer, James Mawhinney, was terminated by the board of Reeltime. The announcement on ASX (Australian Securities Exchange) titled 'Termination of chief operating officer' stated that "The grounds for that termination arose from conduct of his that appeared antithetical to the interests of the Company."

Prior to his termination, Mr Mawhinney established a new business called Eleuthera Group, which he incorporated on 5 March 2014 as Eleuthera Group Pty Ltd ACN 168 390 029.

Reeltime commenced legal proceedings in the Supreme Court of New South Wales claiming Mr Mawhinney had allegedly taken staff and clients to his new business. On 4 April 2014, there was an announcement on ASX titled ‘James Mawhinney – Enforceable Undertakings’ stating that “On 4 April 2014, the Supreme Court of New South Wales received enforceable undertakings from James Mawhinney and Eleuthera Group Pty Ltd in relation to a range of matters preventing those parties from interfering with business arrangements of the Company (Reeltime). Those restrained activities include arrangements with suppliers, agents, vendors and employees.”

Having restrained Mr Mawhinney and his new business, Reeltime set about restoring its business, and in May 2014 Reeltime contacted Mr Mawhinney to acquire his new business concurrently with Design Experts Pty Ltd, and invited him back to run the company, thereby discontinuing the proceedings against him and his companies

On 1 August 2014 Mr Mawhinney was appointed to the Reeltime board as chief executive officer.

By November 2014 Reeltime began acquiring businesses again, entering into agreements to acquire Fitlink Australia, followed by Alkemi International, PCGuru and Scorch Marketing & Communications.

In December 2014 Keith Attwood, the former CEO of a technology company listed on the London Stock Exchange, joined Reeltime in a non-executive director position.

== Technology ==
ReelTime claimed to be the first company to offer download to own for a major Hollywood studio (or electronic sell-through) outside of the US on a same day and date basis as retail release. ReelTime.tv delivered using a progressive download system allowing playout within minutes of commencement of download, such that feature-length movie and television entertainment are delivered direct to PC, Media Centre, playforsure compatible handhelds and TV via the ReelTime Media Centre. Because ReelTime used DRM via Microsoft PlaysForSure, it was incompatible with all free operating systems.

== See also ==
- Internet television
- Video on Demand
- electronic sell-through
