= DVD-by-mail =

Video rental service

DVD-by-mail is a business model in which customers order DVDs and similar discs containing films, television shows, video games, and other media to rent, which are then delivered to the customer by mail. Generally, all interaction between the renter and the rental company takes place through the company's website, using an e-commerce model. Typically, a customer chooses from a list of titles online and adds titles to a queue. As a customer's requested titles become available, the company sends them out. When the customer is finished with the disc, they mail it back to the company.

DVD-by-mail arrived in time to compete with video rental shops, but both have largely been overtaken in developed countries by video on demand (online streaming) services. As a result, formerly operating DVD-by-mail services (e.g. Redbox) are now defunct.

== Background ==
Most companies operate on the following model:

- The customer joins the rental service, typically through an online e-commerce system and a website, and agrees to abide by a list of conditions, and provides some form of electronic payment (e.g., a credit card number).
- Once the customer has registered, they create a list of titles they wish to watch, which are ranked by the customer by priority.
- Titles from the list are mailed to the customer as they become available.
- The customer watches the films or uses the media and then sends the discs back to the rental company using the mail.

Most companies let customers keep the films for as long as they want; customers are, however, limited to a set number of discs out at any one time. Commonly, once a disc is returned, another is sent out. Some companies or plans may have a limit on the total number of movies rented in a month. Memberships are usually billed monthly, and includes postage both ways.

Variations exist; for example, some companies also offer video game rentals while others offer music. Redbox allowed users to reserve DVDs or Blu-ray discs online to retrieve and return the DVD at interactive kiosks located in various retail establishments.

== Throttling ==
Given sufficiently fast mail delivery, customers on "unlimited" plans who return their discs quickly enough can receive enough shipments in a month that the company's cost of delivery exceeds the fixed monthly subscription fee, making this type of customer unprofitable. Even below this point, higher volume customers are less profitable than customers who receive fewer discs per month. If these customers become too numerous, there are various measures which the rental company can take.

One is the so-called "throttling" approach, which received significant publicity with regard to Netflix (which refers to the practice as a "fairness algorithm"). In this case, high-volume customers may experience a greater likelihood of (slower) shipments from alternative warehouses, when the nearest shipment center does not have the requested disc. Also, if there is a high demand for a particular disc, it is more likely that an infrequent renter will get priority over the frequent renters, with the latter receiving a movie further down on their list. They are also less likely to receive replacement shipments on the same day a disc is received. Similar "fair use" caveats can be found in the terms and conditions of leading UK companies such as LOVEFiLM. In Canada, Zip.ca switched to "capped" plans (with additional shipping charges for rentals over the cap) in part to avoid implementing throttling.

LOVEFiLM came under scrutiny from users over its claim to offer "unlimited" movie rentals. Some users reportedly found the company used long delays at the shipping stage to reduce the number of films a month a customer can rent. The company was subject to a dispute by the Advertising Standards Authority over the use of the word "unlimited" in their advertising. It was revealed that they practised throttling. The company itself claimed that this "fair usage" policy means all customers get a similar service.

On March 2, 2006, Blockbuster announced that their service does not implement throttling. "We don't prioritize our customers' movie fulfillment based on how often they use our service, and we don't limit the number of movies a subscriber receives each month," according to Senior Vice-president Shayne Evangelist. However, the terms and conditions each customer has to agree to in order to subscribe to the service states, "Blockbuster Online reserves the right to determine product allocation among members in its sole discretion. In determining product allocation, we use various factors including, but not limited to, (i) the historical rental volume for each subscriber, (ii) historical number of outstanding rentals relative to the maximum number of outstanding Blockbuster Online Rentals allowed under a subscriber's plan, and (iii) the average rental queue position of Blockbuster Online rentals that have shipped to a subscriber in the past."

== Major markets ==
The following is a summary of the major DVD-by-mail markets.

=== Americas ===
==== United States ====
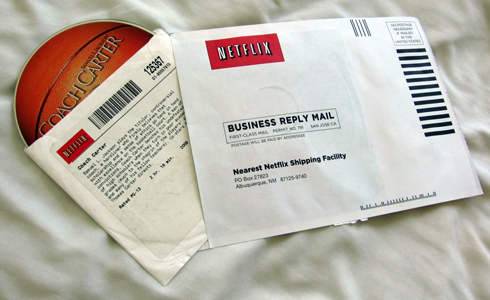
Netflix envelope and inner sleeve with the Coach Carter (2005) DVD inside

Netflix ended 2008 with 9.39 million customers. Around 4.2 million individuals in the U.S. still rented DVDs via mail from the company as of 2017. Netflix announced on April 18, 2023, that their DVD subscription services would be closed and the last DVDs sent via mail was on September 29, 2023. At the end of its DVD-by-mail service, Netflix had completed over 52 billion DVD deliveries.

Blockbuster claimed 1 million online customers in August 2005, 2 million by March 2006, and finished the first quarter of 2007 with 3 million. By the end of 2013, Blockbuster had withdrawn from the DVD-by-mail market. Walmart briefly entered the market as well, but withdrew in 2005 and then went into a cross-promotional agreement with Netflix. There have been a number of smaller companies, some of which target specific niches: eHit, the first such niche company, came online in 2000 targeting fans of Asian films; specifically Japan, China, and Korea, expanding to include other countries' films over time.

==== Canada ====
Estimates put the number of Canadian subscribers at 70–80,000, with Zip.ca having had around 50,000 before ceasing operations. Other competitors include Kaku.ca and DVDlink.ca. Cinemail.ca announced it would cease operations at the end of June 2013.

==== Mexico ====
Blockbuster Online started DVD rentals in Mexico during 2007, after the chain acquired a local startup called MovieNet.

==== Brazil ====
Blockbuster Online started DVD rentals in Brazil during 2006 and now offers Blu-ray plans as well. The 3-disc unlimited rental plan costs R$49.90/month with unlimited exchanges.

=== Europe ===
==== United Kingdom ====
Given the relatively small geographical area and high population density of the UK, online DVD rentals have some differences from the US, as a single shipping facility can serve the entire country. In-Movies.com launched the UK's first subscription service in May 2000 at £14.99 per month for a 3 disc plan and merged with Screen Select in December 2003. In April 2006, LoveFilm merged with its major rival Video Island, which had operated ScreenSelect and other brands, and in February 2008, LoveFilm acquired Amazon's DVD rental business in the UK and German markets. In return, Amazon became the largest shareholder of LoveFilm. LoveFilm ceased operating on 31 October 2017. Cinema Paradiso is now the only remaining supplier of rental DVDs in the UK.

=== Asia/Oceania ===
==== Australia ====
The most prominent Australian provider was Quickflix, which provided the service alongside online streaming of movies until it ceased operations in 2021. Other companies which operated in Australia included HomeScreen, which Quickflix acquired in 2005, and BigPond Movies, which sold their library of 50,000 titles to Quickflix in 2011.

==== New Zealand ====
There were three online DVD rental companies in New Zealand, all offering flat-rate packages. The three companies were DVD Unlimited, Fatso and Movieshack. On June 7, 2008, all three companies merged into Fatso, owned by SKY Network Television. Fatso ceased operations on 23 November 2017 due to declining membership.

==== Singapore ====
Hollywoodclicks and Videohub are the two most established online DVD rental services in Singapore. Hollywoodclicks was the first to market, followed by Video Ezy Online. Video Ezy Online rental service was shut down at the start of 2009 and was converted to a home delivery service.

==== India ====
There are several online DVD rental services in India, all running their own delivery systems and logistics. Unlike online DVD rental companies in other countries, online DVD rental services in India do not use the postal service as a means of delivery or exchange. India's first online DVD rental service Clixflix started in August 2004. Cinesprite, Seventymm and Reliance BigFlix have closed their operations. Clixflix (the oldest) is still in operation in Mumbai.

==== Japan ====
Major online rental Blu-ray Disc and DVD companies are Tsutaya Discas, Posren, and DMM.com.

== See also ==
- HD DVD
- VCD
- VHS
