= Project Runway (franchise) =

Reality television franchise

Project Runway is a reality competition television format created by Eli Holzman that originated with the American TV show Project Runway, which premiered in December 2004.

== International adaptations ==
Countries highlighted in red indicate a version of the show that is no longer airing.

Country	Name	Host	Channel	First Premiere	Regular Judge	Seasons	Winners
Algeria	Project Runway Algeria	Maroua Bekkouche	Echorouk TV	November 4, 2023	Karim Akrouf; Meriem Abdellatif; Rayan Atlas (mentor)	2	Season 1, 2023: Amine Smati; Season 2, 2024: Sakina Laidi
(Arab League) Arab World	Project Fashion: El Musamim El Arabi	Norma Naoum	Future TV	February 26, 2006	Norma Naoum; Maria Aziz; Rabih Keyrouz (mentor)	2	Season 1, 2006: Julien Abboud; Season 2, 2007: Mohammed Ashi
(Arab League) Arab World	Project Runway Middle East	Jessica Kahawaty (Season 1); Valerie Abou Chacra (Season 2)	MBC 1	September 17, 2016	Elie Saab; Afef Jnifen; Faris Al Shehri (mentor)		Season 1, 2016: Alaa Najd; Season 2, 2017: Saher Okal
Australia	Project Runway Australia	Kristy Hinze (Season 1–2); Megan Gale (Season 3–4)	Arena	Season 1: July 7, 2008 – September 15, 2008; Season 2: July 8, 2009 – September 16, 2009; Season 3: July 4, 2011 – September 12, 2011; Season 4: October 8, 2012 – December 17, 2012	Jarrad Clark; Kirrily Johnston; Alex Perry (mentor)	4	Season 1, 2008: Juli Grbac; Season 2, 2009: Anthony Capon; Season 3, 2011: Dylan Cooper; Season 4, 2012: Christina Exie
Belgium	De Designers	Evi Hanssen	VTM	December 16, 2008	Christophe Coppens; Veerle Windels; Ann Claes; Erik Verdonck (mentor)	2	Season 1, 2008–2009: An Buermans; Season 2, 2009–2010: Gianni Lapage
Brazil	Projeto Fashion	Adriane Galisteu	Band	September 17, 2011	Susana Barbosa; Reinaldo Lourenço; Alexandre Herchcovitch (mentor)	1	Season 1, 2011: Cynthia Hayashi
Canada	Project Runway Canada	Iman (Season 1–2); Coco Rocha (Season 3)	Slice; Global	October 8, 2007	Jeanne Beker (judge season 3); Spencer Badu (judge season 3); Shawn Hewson (judge season 1–2); Rita Silvan (judge season 1–2); Aurora James (mentor season 3); Brian Bailey (mentor season 1–2)	3	Season 1, 2007: Evan Biddell; Season 2, 2009: Sunny Fong; Season 3, 2025-2026: Leeland Mitchell
Finland	Muodin huipulle	Minna Cheung (season 1); Nora Vilva (season 2)	MTV3	November 1, 2009	Minna Cheung (Season 1); Nora Vilva (Season 2); Anssi Tuupainen (Season 1); Jaakko Selin (mentor season 1, judge season 2); Janne Renvall (mentor season 2)	2	Season 1, 2009: Katri Niskanen; Season 2, 2011: Linda Sipilä; Season 3, 2023: Pali Albin; Season 4, 2024: Miro Hämäläinen
France	Projet Fashion	Hapsatou Sy	D8	March 3, 2015	Catherine Baba; Roland Mouret; Alexandra Senes; Donald Potard (mentor)	1	Season 1, 2015: Pierre-Henry Bor
Greece	Project Runway	Evangelia Aravani	Open TV	October 25, 2018	Roula Revi; Dimitris Petrou; Mihalis Pantos; Apostolos Mitropoulos (mentor)	1	Season 1, 2018–2019: Margarita Priftaki
Israel	פרויקט מסלול; Proyekt Maslul	Shiraz Tal	Channel 2 (Reshet)	June 17, 2009 – October 2009	Vivi Bleish; Gal Afel; Sason Kedem (mentor)	1	Season 1, 2008–2009: Alon Livne
Italy	Project Runway Italia	Eva Herzigová	Fox Life	February 26, 2014 – April 30, 2014	Alberta Ferretti; Tomaso Trussardi; Ildo Damiano (mentor)	1	Season 1, 2014: Marco Taranto
Jamaica	Mission Catwalk	Keneea Linton-George	TVJ	March 15, 2011	Keneea Linton-George (mentor season 2, hostess and judge seasons 1–3); Novia McDonald-Whyte; Carlton Brown; Sandra Kennedy (mentor Season 1); Kay Davitian (mentor)	7	Season 1, 2011: Shenna Carby; Season 2, 2012: Gregory Williams; Season 3, 2013: Theodore Elyett; Season 4, 2014: Kurt Campbell; Season 5, 2015: David Rolle; Season 6, 2018: Rochele Spencer; Season 7, 2023: Aaron Moneer
Latin America	Project Runway Latin America	Rebecca de Alba (season 1 & 2); Eglantina Zingg (season 3)	Fashion TV (season 1), Glitz* (season 2 & 3)	September 20, 2010	Claudia Pandolfo (season 1–2); Ariadne Grant (season 3); Ángel Sánchez; Mariano Toledo (mentor in season 1–2) Jorge Duque Velez (mentor season 3)	3	Season 1, 2010: Jorge Duque Velez; Season 2, 2011: Karyn Coo; Season 3, 2013: Matias Hernan
Mongolia	Project Runway Mongolia	Tserendolgor Battsengel	Star TV	October 2, 2022	Michel Choigaalaa; Ovdogmid Delgerdalai; Zorig Tumennasan; Khuslen Ganhuu (mentor)	1	Season 1, 2022: Enkhbazar E.
Malaysia	Project Runway Malaysia	Bernie Chan	8TV	August 3, 2007	Bernie Chan; Datuk Bernard Chandran	1	Season 1, 2007: Felix Chin
Netherlands	Project Catwalk	Renate Verbaan (season 1 & 2); Stacey Rookhuizen (season 3)	RTL 5	October 8, 2007	Simone Dernee (season 1); Cecile Narinx (season 2); Daryl van Wouw (season 1 & 2); Olcay Gulsen (season 3); Jan Taminiau (season 3)	3	Season 1, 2007: Django Steenbakker
New Zealand	Project Runway New Zealand	Georgia Fowler	TVNZ 2	October 1, 2018 – December 17, 2018	Benny Castles; Sally-Ann Mullin; Andreas Mikellis (mentor)	1	Season 1, 2018: Benjamin Alexander
Norway	Designerspirene	Vendela Kirsebom	TV3	February 26, 2007 – May 2007	Vendela Kirsebom; Peter Løchstøer; Petra Middelthon; William Jensen (mentor)	1	Season 1, 2005–2006: Daniel Sørensen
Philippines	Project Runway Philippines	Teresa Herrera (2008–2009); Tweetie De Leon (2011–2015)	ETC; SBN 21	Season 1: July 30, 2008 – November 12, 2008; Season 2: August 12, 2009 – December 2, 2009; Season 3: March 25, 2012 – May 13, 2012; Season 4: June 14, 2015 – August 2015	Apples Aberin-Sahdwani; Rajo Laurel; Jojie Lloren (mentor)	4	Season 1, 2008: Aries Lagat; Season 2, 2009: Manny Marquez; Season 3, 2012: Milka Quin Redoble; Season 4, 2015: Jose Joy Chicano
Poland	Project Runway	Anja Rubik	TVN	March 2, 2014	Anja Rubik; Joanna Przetakiewicz; Marcin Tyszka (season 2); Mariusz Przybylski (season 1); Tomasz Ossoliński (mentor)	2	Season 1, 2014: Jakub "Jacob" Bartnik; Season 2, 2015: Michał Zieliński
Portugal	Projecto Moda	Nayma Mingas	RTP1	July 25, 2010 – September 26, 2010	Manuel Alves; Fátima Cotta; Cristina Pinho; Paulo Gomes (mentor)	1	Season 1, 2010: Carina Duarte
Russia	Проект Подиум; Project Runway Russia	Anna Sedokova (season 1); Maria Minogarova (season 2)	MTV Russia (season 1); Friday! (season 2)	Season 1: October 8, 2011; season 2: October 18, 2018	Elena Sotnikova (season 1); Leonid Alexeyev (season 1); Pavel Kaplevich (mentor; season 1); Valentin Yudashkin (season 2); Tim Ilyasov (mentor; season 2)	2	Season 1, 2011–2012: Dmitry Neu; Season 2, 2018: Elizaveta Kostyukova
South Africa	Project Runway South Africa	Lerato Kganyago	Mzansi Magic	August 17, 2018	Noni Gasa; Rahim Rawjee; Gert-Johan Coetzee (mentor)	1	Season 1, 2018: Kentse Masilo
South Korea	프로젝트 런웨이 코리아; Project Runway Korea	Lee So-ra	Onstyle	February 7, 2009	Shin Yoo-jin; Kim Seok-won; Kan Ho-sup (mentor)	5	Season 1, 2009: Lee Woo-kyung; Season 2, 2010: Jung Go-woun; Season 3, 2011: Shin Joo-yeon; Season 4, 2012: Kim Hye-ran; All-Stars 1, 2015: Hwang Jae-geun
Sweden	Project Runway Sverige	Sofi Fahrman	TV3	October 1, 2012	Rossana Mariano; Marcel Marongiu; Rohdi Heintz (mentor)	1	Season 1, 2012: Naim Josefi
Thailand	Project Runway Thailand	Anne Jakrajutatip	JKN 18	May 7, 2022	Ek Thongprasert; Kwankao Svetavimala; Guest star; Tawn Chatchawanwong (mentor)	1	Season 1, 2022: Folk Apisit Permlab
Turkey	Proje Moda	Güzide Duran	Star TV	July 9, 2007	Cemil İpekçi; Işın Görmüş; Barbarossa	1	Season 1, 2007: Selim Baklacı
Ukraine	Подіум; Podium	Nataliya Gotsiy	Novyi Kanal	February 20, 2019	Olha Slon; Ivan Suprun; Lilya Liykovska; Jean Gritsfeldt (mentor)	1	Season 1, 2019: Maria Dzyubenko & Maksim Sereda (Duet Sereda)
United Kingdom	Project Catwalk	Elizabeth Hurley (2006); Kelly Osbourne (2007–2008)	Sky One	2006–2008	Julien Macdonald; Lorraine Candy (2006); Paula Reed (2007–2008); Ben de Lisi (mentor)	3	Season 1, 2006: Kirsty Doyle; Season 2, 2007: Wayne Aveline; Season 3, 2008: Jasper Garvida
Vietnam	Project Runway Vietnam	Ngô Thanh Vân (2013); Trương Ngọc Ánh (2014–2015)	VTV3	Season 1: April 28 – June 16, 2013; Season 2 : May 11, 2013 – July 6, 2014; Season 3 : December 19, 2015 – January 30, 2016	Đỗ Mạnh Cường (2013); Chloe Dao (2013); Trần Nguyễn Thiên Hương (2013–2016); Nguyễn Công Trí (2014–2016); Nguyễn Thanh Tùng (mentor)	3	Season 1, 2013: Hoàng Minh Hà; Season 2, 2014: Lý Giám Tiền; Season 3, 2015–2016: Nguyễn Tiến Truyển
