= Sarah Lawrence (actress) =

Australian model, comedian and TV personality

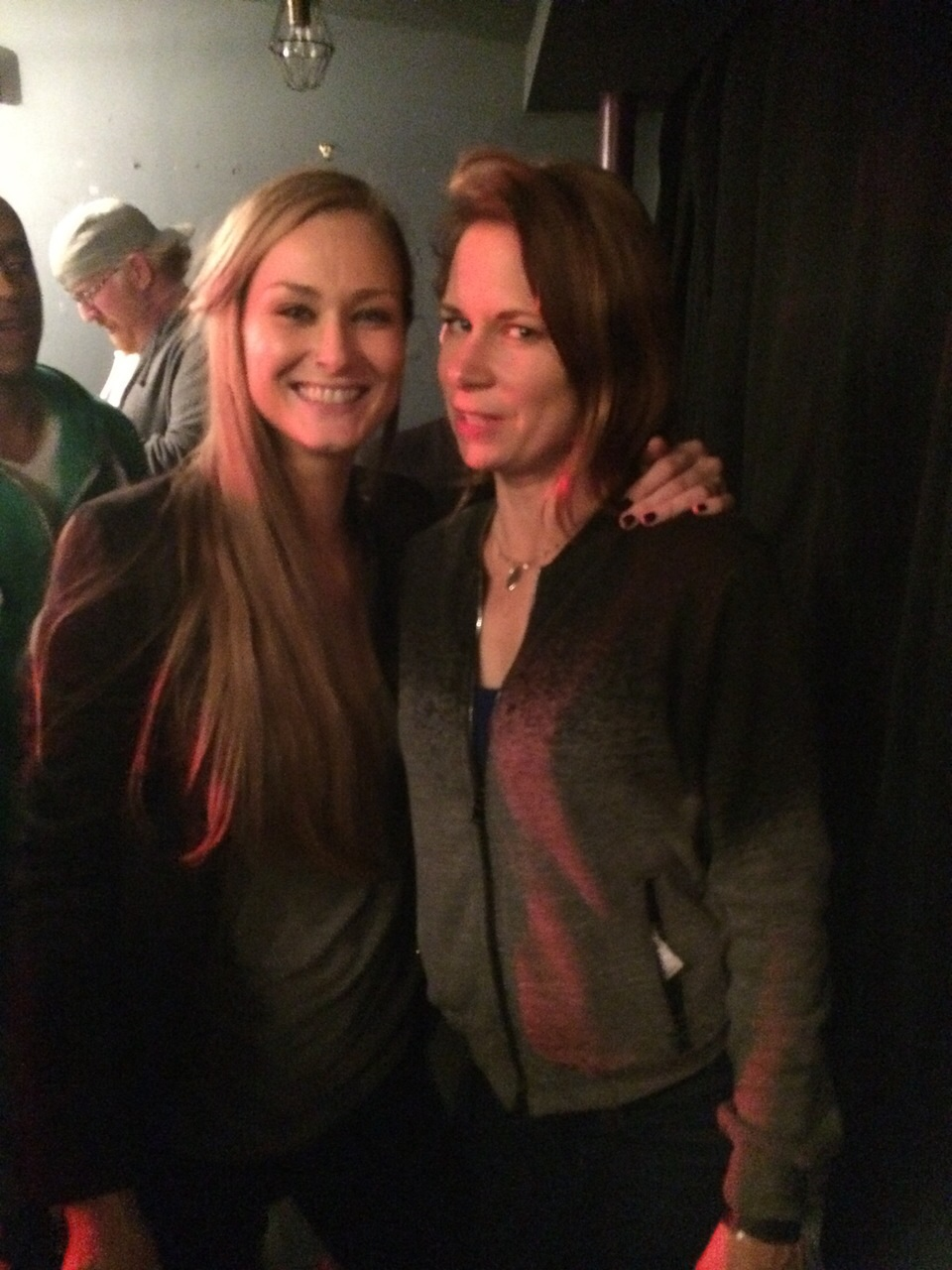
- Sarah Lawrence (left) with Mary Lynn Rajskub (right) at a Comedy Club in Los Angeles
- Born: Sarah Rachael Olivia Lawrence; 1 May 1986 (age 40); Perth, Western Australia, Australia
- Occupations: Comedian, actress, model
- Years active: 2006–present

Sarah Rachael Olivia Lawrence (born 1 May 1986) is an Australian model, comedian and TV personality. She is best known for her role in the Australian feature film Stone Bros.

== Career ==
Lawrence started her career when she applied for a casting call for season 2 of Australia's Next Top Model in 2006. She originally cast for the program in her hometown of Perth and was flown over to Sydney to compete. She lasted four weeks in the competition and was the fifth contestant to be eliminated. She continued modelling in Perth, represented by Scene Models.

In 2007, Lawrence auditioned for a role on Wake Up! WA and became their newest recruit. She began as a sports and weather reporter and was promoted to host after a few weeks. Shortly after this she took part in a nationwide search to find MTV's next VJ. The journey through the stages of the competition was made into a one-hour TV show, which aired on Foxtel in 2009. She made it through to the final four of the competition which was decided by a public vote. She was flown to Sydney to take part in a series of challenges created by Bam Margera. Ruby Rose ended up taking the title.

Shortly after this experience, she moved from Perth to Melbourne. She worked full-time for the next few years in modelling, television and live events. She co-hosted several events throughout Melbourne with Australian personality Pete Lazer, for clients such as Variety, the Children's Charity, of which Lazer is a board member, the Melbourne Spring Racing Carnival, including working for BMW for the BMW Caulfield Cup, the Caulfield Guineas Day, and The Asthma Foundation of Victoria which has raised hundreds of thousands of dollars since its inception. She was the official host for DayGlow, The World's Largest Paint Party in 2010, where she interviewed guest DJ Static Revenger.

Although filmed in 2007, the feature film Stone Bros. wasn't released until 2009. Upon its release to national cinemas there were issues regarding ratings. Originally given an MA15+ rating by the Australian Classification Board, director/producer Richard Frankland appealed for it to be reduced. Lawrence gained the following nominations from the Inside Film Awards; Best Actress and People's Choice Award. She was also nominated for Best Young Actor from the Australian Film Institute. The success of Stone Bros. in cinemas saw it released to TV, DVD and more recently, for American audiences.

In 2009 Lawrence was selected to be a model on Project Runway Australia, hosted by model Kristy Hinze. Her initial designer William Lazootin was runner up. This season of Project Runway Australia was nominated for two awards: Favourite Program and Most Outstanding Light Entertainment Program, which it won.

After the experience on Project Runway Australia, Lawrence teamed up with stylist contestant Amber Renae for a week-long styling event in Greensborough Plaza. The pair were given a time limit and budget and had to visit select shops and create an outfit that would be judged by an audience. The audience could then take turns to style the pairs' mannequins and their "style sense" would be judged.

== Other ==
Lawrence has shot national television commercials for Taubmans Paint, a brand of PPG Industries, Nokia N Series , Macleans Toothpaste, a subsidiary of GlaxoSmithKline, LotteryWest and Foxtel.
