= 2002 in red carpet fashion =

Red carpet fashion in 2002 saw January's Golden Globes called "simple and safe", and the Oscars in March described as "conservative" and "a night of fashion blunders". The events of September 11 the previous year had an effect on red carpet style, with many guests at September's Emmys choosing to wear black in remembrance of those who died.

== Golden Globe Awards (January 21) ==
The main look of the evening at the 59th Golden Globe Awards was a very low-cut V-necked gown in red, black, or purple tones, with large dangling earrings and pale lipstick, while male guests mostly wore black or silver ties with white shirts under their tuxedos. Some exceptions were Heather Locklear in turquoise-beaded Celine, Kate Hudson in silver, and Andie MacDowell in red-and-white Escada; whilst Sting and Benjamin Bratt wore open-necked shirts. Silhouettes were either form-fitting or full-skirted, in flowing silk and tulle fabrics.

The looks on the red carpet were reviewed by Joan and Melissa Rivers in a special edition of the E! Fashion Police television programme.

== Academy Awards (March 24) ==
Prior to the 74th Academy Awards ceremony, its producer Laura Ziskin encouraged attendees to make an effort. However, the gowns seen on the red carpet were generally not well received, with Marcelle D'Argy Smith, formerly of Cosmopolitan, describing it as a "night of fashion blunders", saying that only the men in their tuxedos looked really gorgeous. One dress that was particularly criticised was Gwyneth Paltrow's black Alexander McQueen dress with a transparent ruched bodice, which, ten years later, was still being cited as an Oscar fashion disaster. Also criticised were Barbra Streisand's burgundy velvet "tent/wrap/curtain" and Jennifer Connelly's strapless tulle dress in "shrieking beige" and "pale dung" (described elsewhere as "phlegm-coloured"). Nicole Kidman's pale pink Chanel dress was dismissed as nice but boring by D'Argy Smith, although admired elsewhere. She was the only high-profile attendee in Chanel that evening, having requested exclusive rights to being dressed by the house.

However, that year's Best Actress winner, Halle Berry, had a hit with an Elie Saab dress with a strategically embroidered nude-effect brown net bodice and a voluminous taffeta skirt, which Cosmopolitan magazine suggested in 2008 was "probably one of the best known Oscar dresses of all time". Like Paltrow's dress, Berry's dress was still being cited ten years later, but as a fashion success that made Saab an "overnight sensation". It was voted 8th greatest red carpet gown of all time in a 2008 Debenhams poll, just behind Kate Winslet's red Ben de Lisi gown at 7th. Winslet's dress, unadorned except for an asymmetrical flowered strap running across the front, was largely admired, Cosmopolitan declaring it simple but "ultra-flattering", although Amanda Platell for the New Statesman described Winslet as resembling a "podgy mum from Muswell Hill" (whilst declaring Berry's dress the best of the night). As with Saab, de Lisi received a major boost, saying the following year: "I can't possibly quantify how much publicity I got from that or how much money I made. And now, every time anyone writes about her [Winslet] they use the picture of her in the dress and so it just goes on and on."

== Emmys (22 September) ==
Whilst encouraged to dress up for the event, many attendees at the 54th Primetime Emmy Awards wore black in memory of the September 11 attacks the previous year, which led to the previous year's ceremony being postponed until November. However, a few attendees wore colour, including Jennifer Aniston in pink Dior and Oprah Winfrey whose pale yellow chiffon dress by Bradley Bayou was cited as one of the best dresses of the night.
