= Amilna Estêvão =

Angolan fashion model

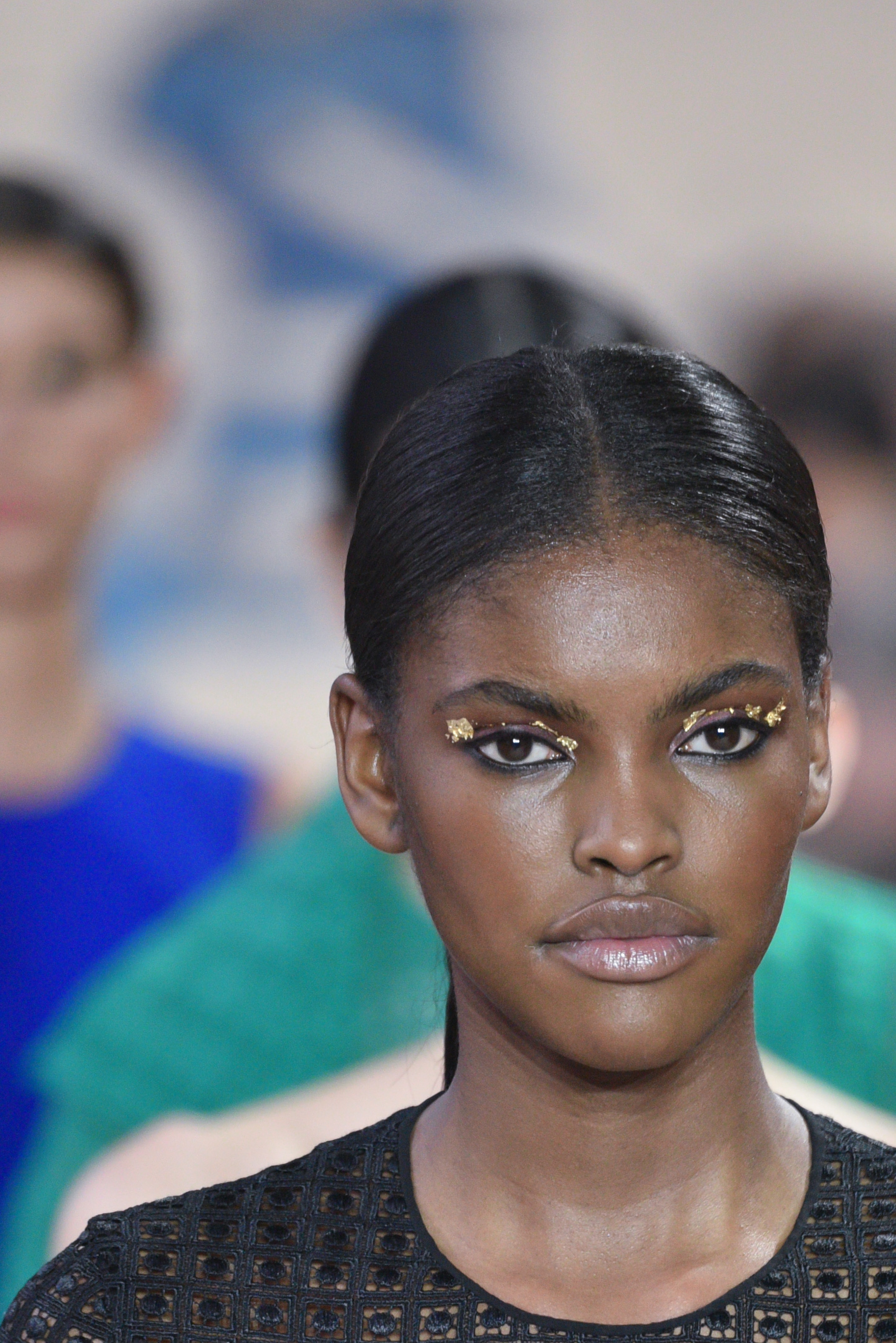
- Amilna Estêvão in 2018
- Born: 3 February 1999 (age 26); Luanda, Angola
- Modeling information
- Height: 1.79 m (5 ft 10 1/2 in)
- Hair color: Dark brown
- Eye color: Brown
- Agency: The Society Management (New York); Elite Model Management (Paris, Milan, London, Amsterdam, Barcelona, Copenhagen); Ice Models (Hamburg); Da Banda Model Management (Luanda); MP Stockholm (Stockholm); Stella Models (Vienna)

Amilna Estêvão is an Angolan fashion model.

== Career ==
Estêvão was scouted in Angola by her mother agency Da Banda Model Management where she won Elite Model Look Angola 2013 . She became the first Black female finalist to reach the Top 3 position at the Elite Model Look competition 2013 edition. Afterwards, she signed with Elite Model Management and debuted in the F/W 2015 fashion week season notably walking for Prada, Fendi, Balenciaga, Alexander Wang, and Moschino. Later that year she walked for Prabal Gurung, Gucci, Kenzo, Burberry Prorsum, Givenchy, Alberta Ferretti, Lanvin, and Bottega Veneta among others. In 2017, she was on the front cover of Máxima with Nayma Mingas.
