= Marco Tronchetti Provera =

Italian businessman (born 1948)

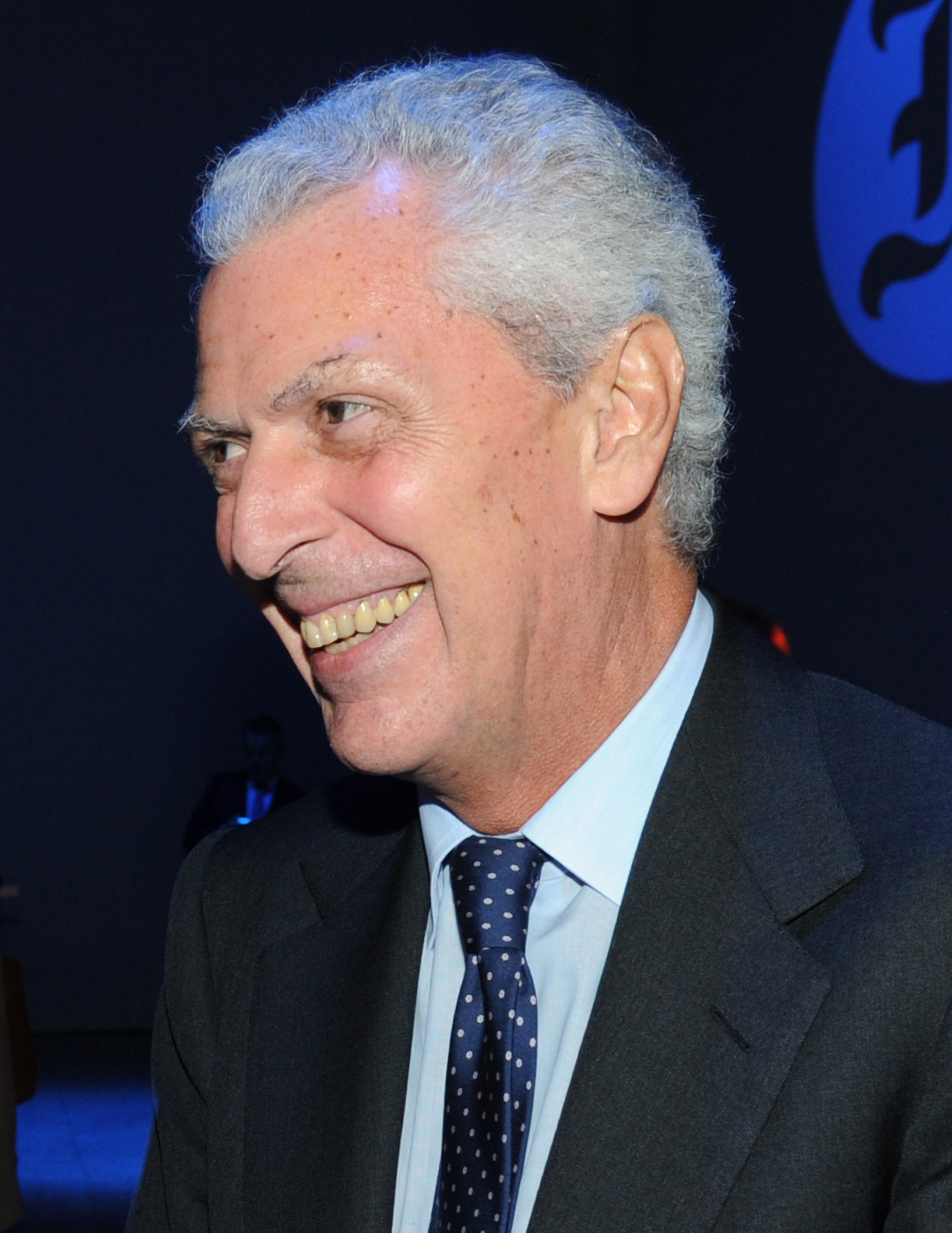
- Provera in 2012
- Born: 18 January 1948 (age 78); Milan, Italy
- Education: Bocconi University
- Occupation: Businessman
- Years active: 1986–present
- Organization: Mediobanca
- Spouses: Letizia Rittatore Vonwiller; Cecilia Pirelli (m. 1987, divorced) Afef Jnifen (m. 2001; div. 2018)
- Children: 3

Marco Tronchetti Provera (Italian pronunciation: [ˈmarko troŋˈketti proˈvɛːra]; born 18 January 1948) is an Italian businessman. He was the CEO of the Italian tire manufacturer Pirelli & C. from 1992 to 2022, and has been its executive chairman since June 2026.

== Early life and education ==
Marco Tronchetti Provera was born in Milan in 1948. In 1971, Provera obtained an Economics and Business Administration degree from the Bocconi University of Milan.

== Career ==
Provera joined Pirelli & C. in 1986. In 1987, he married Cecilia Pirelli, the daughter of the company's CEO, and chairman, Leopoldo Pirelli. In 1992, Pirelli chose to step down from his role as CEO following an unsuccessful merger with the German auto parts firm Continental. Pirelli retained his position on the board and appointed Provera, his son-in-law, to succeed him as CEO.

In 2001, Provera acquired a controlling stake in Telecom Italia's main holding and became chairman of the company. He would later attempt to sell the company to Mexican telecommunications mogul Carlos Slim.

In 2015, Provera oversaw Pirelli & C.'s $7-billion takeover by ChemChina. Provera successfully negotiated to remain executive vice-chairman and CEO of the tire company following the acquisition. In May 2022, he stepped down as CEO of Pirelli while remaining its Executive Vice-Chairman.

Provera is the chairman of the holding company Marco Tronchetti and Provera & C. S.p.A., in which he holds a controlling stake. The firm indirectly holds 50% of Camfin S.p.A., where Provera was chair until December 2013. Camfin itself indirectly holds 41% of Marco Polo Industrial Holding S.p.A., the investment vehicle established by ChemChina to facilitate its acquisition of Pirelli & C.

== Other roles ==
- Since September 2020: Member of the Italian Aspen Institute.
- Deputy chairman of the Board of Mediobanca
- Member of the executive committee of Confindustria
- Member of the International Advisory Board of insurance company Allianz
- Member of the Steering Committee of Assonime and of Assolombarda.
- Honorary co-chairman for the Italian branch of the Council for the United States and Italy
- Member of the Italian Group of the Trilateral Commission.
- December 1996 - September 2005: Chairman of Il Sole 24 Ore
- October 2001 - September 2005: Board member of Milan's La Scala opera house
- September 2001 - September 2006: Chairman of Telecom Italia S.p.A

== Personal life ==
Provera has been married three times. His first wife was journalist Letizia Rittatore Vonwiller. He married Cecilia Pirelli in 1987, with whom he had three children. In December 2001, he married Afef Jnifen, which lasted until they announced their divorce in 2018.
