= Project Runway Australia =

- Created by: Eli Holzman
- Starring: Kristy Hinze (S 1–2); Henry Roth (S 1–2); Sarah Gale (S 1–2); Jayson Brunsdon (S 1–2); Jarrad Clark (S 3); Kirrily Johnston (S 3); Megan Gale (S 3–4); Alex Perry (S 3–4); Claudia Navone (S 4); Peter Morrissey (S 4)
- Country of origin: Australia
- Original language: English
- No. of seasons: 4
- No. of episodes: 44

Production
- Running time: 60 minutes (including commercials)
- Production company: FremantleMedia Australia

Original release
- Network: Arena
- Release: 7 July 2008 – 17 December 2012

Project Runway Australia is a reality television show based on the American program Project Runway, wherein fashion designers residing in Australia compete by making specific garments for weekly challenges. The show features Megan Gale as the host, and Peter Morrissey and Claudia Navone as judges. Alex Perry acts as a mentor to the contestants, as Tim Gunn does in the American version. Production began in May 2008, and the show premiered on Arena 8.30 p.m. (AEST) Monday 7 July 2008. The show ended after 4 seasons, with the final season airing on 17 December 2012.

The prizes for the winner of Project Runway Australia included what is described as "$100,000 opportunity" to create their own fashion line to show in Melbourne Fashion Week, a new car, the model of which changes throughout the seasons, and having their clothes displayed in a six-page spread in the now defunct Madison magazine.

== Judges and mentor ==
The original judging panel consisted of fashion model Kristy Hinze, Sarah Gale, a fashion buyer and a fashion trends forecaster, and Jayson Brunsdon, a fashion designer in Australia. Brunsdon has dressed celebrities including INXS, Princess Mary, and Linda Evangelista. For the first two seasons, Henry Roth served as the mentor to the designers. He is a fashion designer who lived in New York for 10 years and was a judge on the program Style Court.
Hinze, Sarah Gale and Brunsdon were replaced by Megan Gale, Kirrily Johnston and Jarrad Clark respectively for the third season, with Alex Perry replacing Henry Roth as mentor.

In 2012 fashion designer Peter Morrissey and fashion stylist Claudia Navone joined the show as judges. Megan Gale remained as host.

== Format ==
Project Runway uses progressive elimination to reduce the initial field of 10 or more fashion designers down to 3 or 4 before the final challenge. Each non-finale challenge (the scope of one episode) requires the designers to develop one or several pieces of new clothing to be presented at an in-house runway show. The challenges range in creative diversity to test the designers' ingenuity while maintaining their personal design aesthetic. These challenges may include creating a garment from non-traditional materials, such as car parts or recyclable materials; to designing for a certain high-profile person (example, singer Kelly Rowland), a corporate fashion line (example, Myer), or centered around a specialized theme such as "cocktail party", "wedding gown", or "bikini".

The show takes place in Melbourne with designers using a workroom at the Whitehouse Institute of Design. They shop for materials at a fabric store in Melbourne (usually at Rathdowne Fabrics) — unless the challenge requires otherwise. The designers are sequestered together in apartments. While on the show, the designers are prohibited from leaving the apartments without authorization, making unauthorized communication with family or friends, or using the Internet to research designs. Designers are also forbidden to bring pattern books or similar how-to books with them during the show, or risk being disqualified from the competition.

The designers are given a budgeted stipend to select and purchase fabric and notions, and then are provided a limited amount of time to finish their designs (from as short as half a day to two or three days). Often, the designers work independently, although on some challenges, contestants must work in teams or as a single collective group. Once the deadline is reached, the designers must dress their models in addition to styling their hair, make-up and accessories. Each model walks down the runway, and the garment the contestant made plus the model's styling is rated by a panel of the season's judges and one or two guest judges. Each look is scored in a number of categories from 0 to 5 with the judges making notations. The judges then interview the designers who garnered the highest and the lowest scores (usually a top 3 and a bottom 3) and share their opinions before conferring as a group in private after the designers' defense of their outfits. The panel then selects the winning and losing designers based on their scores and other considerations. Typically, the winner receives immunity for the next challenge, and therefore, cannot be eliminated. As the season progresses, Immunity is disregarded to prevent the designers from getting an easy pass to make it into the final round. Other incentives given to the contestants aside from winning immunity is that the winning garment may be featured in print media, integrated into a limited edition look for a particular clothing brand, or sold at an online fashion store.

After the final challenge, the remaining three or four designers are then instructed to prepare a complete fashion collection of 10 looks. Unlike some other Project Runway franchises, in the Australian version, the three finalists do not all present at Fashion Week. Instead, they are told they will present their collections in a live runway show before an audience of their peers, and the winner is chosen from that show. Only the winner of the season gets to go on to Fashion Week.

The finalists are given 2 months and $10,000 for this task, which they perform at their own homes or studios. While some construction work can be outsourced, the majority of the garments must be created by the designers themselves. Prior to the show, the finalists must return to Melbourne to oversee model casting, hair and make-up consultations, finishing touches to their clothes, final fitting on their models, and also may be thrown an additional challenge, such as designing an additional outfit to blend in with the collection. Their receipts are also handed over to the producers of the show to determine if they went over budget or had outsourcing done as favors, both of which are against the rules. Otherwise, they might be forced to eliminate a crucial aesthetic factor in their presentation, or risk affecting their potential scoring from the judging panel should they stand by their decision to use a forbidden item. The ultimate winner is selected by the judges, and receives $100,000 to start his or her own design line, a magazine feature spread in Madison magazine, and a mentorship from a design firm (ended on Season 3). Subsequent seasons have also included a new car as part of the prize package, courtesy of car companies such as Fiat 500.

The models who work with the designers throughout the season are also in the competition. Each week, as the number of designers dwindle, the number of models are also reduced, with one model remaining at the end. Models are randomly pre-assigned to a designer during the first challenge, and from the second challenge onwards, the designers will have an opportunity to pick the model they wish to work with. This usually happens during the start of every episode save for the first, with the winner of the previous challenge receiving first pick, and the other designers picking models in order through host Hinze's random draw of large red shirt buttons with their names stored in a black velvet bag. Though, there are times when only the winning designer will be given the choice to pick with the following choices: either keep his or her previous model, take the losing designer's model from the last challenge, or switch models with another competing designer. Included in the prize package for the winning model is coverage in Madison magazine, featuring the winning designer's twelve-piece collection as part of her prize. However, certain challenges may not require the models at all.

Joining Hinze in judging duties were Jayson Brunsdon, fashion buyer Sarah Gale, and one or two guest judges - typically fashion designers, supermodels, celebrities or professionals from an industry related to the challenge given. Henry Roth acted as mentor to the designers and did not participate in the judging. Instead, he gave the details of the challenge at hand, accompanied the designers during their fabric shopping at Rathdowne or on field trips related to a particular challenge, visited the designers midway through each challenge to comment and suggest improvements for each design, and enforced the time limit before each runway show.

== Season synopses ==
Season	Premiere date	Finale date	No. of Designers	Winner	Runner(s)-up	Designer Prizes
1	7 July 2008	15 September 2008	12	Juli Grbac	Leigh Buchanan	A Fiat 500; $100,000 to create their own fashion line at Melbourne Fashion Week; An editorial feature in Elle magazine; A spread in Madison magazine
2	8 July 2009	16 September 2009	12	Anthony Capon	William Lazootin	A Holden Cruze; $100,000 to create their own fashion line at Rosemount Fashion Week; An editorial feature in Elle magazine; A spread in Madison magazine
3	4 July 2011	6 September 2011	12	Dylan Cooper	Craig Braybrook	A Suzuki Swift GLX; An opportunity to create their own fashion line at Australian Fashion Week 2012/13; Hairstyling & product for their sow valued at $10,000; 7 Day trip to NYC and Miami; $50,000 of cash a product from Rathdowne Fabrics & Birch Haberdashery; A spread in Madison magazine
4	8 October 2012	17 December 2012	12	Christina Exie	Leah DaGloria, Tristan Melle, Jamie Ashkar	A Kia Rio; An opportunity to create their own fashion line at Mercedes Benz Fashion Week Australia SS 2013/14; Tresemme style team and product for their show valued at $10,000; $50,000 of cash a product from Rathdowne Fabrics & Birch Haberdashery; A spread in Madison magazine

- In Season 4, all 4 finalists were present when the winner was announced, there was nobody eliminated before this, leaving three to be Runners-up.
