= Yeojin Bae =

Australian fashion designer

- Born: 1975 (age 50–51); Seoul, South Korea
- Occupation: Fashion designer

Korean name
- Hangul: 배여진
- RR: Bae Yeojin
- MR: Pae Yŏjin
- Website: shop.yeojinbae.com

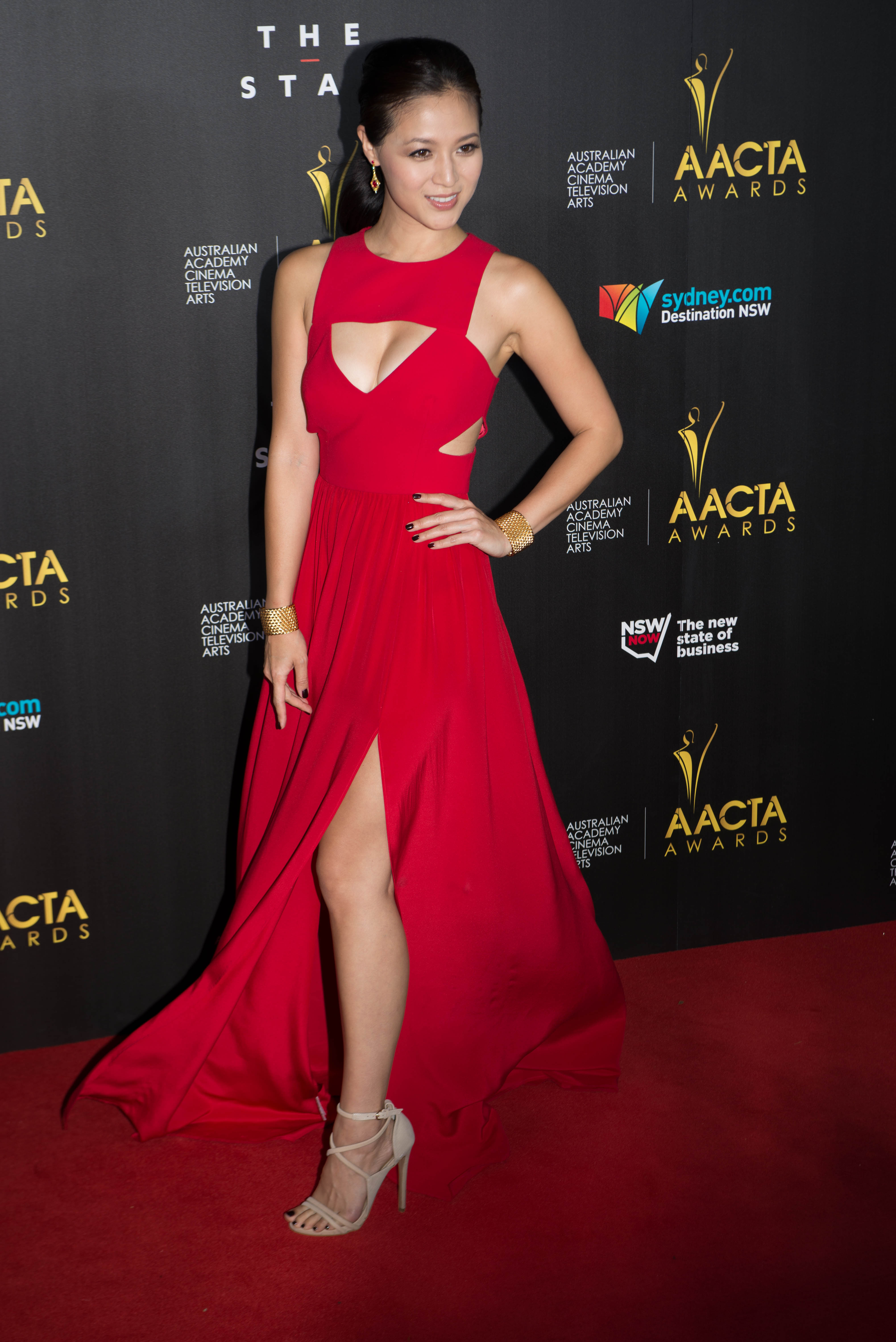
Grace Huang wearing Yeojin Bae on 2014 AACTA Awards red carpet

Yeojin Bae is a South Korean-born Australian women's wear fashion designer.

== Early life ==
Bae was born in 1975 in Seoul, and moved to Sydney in 1980.

In an interview in 2010, Bae said that she had dreams of being a fashion designer from a young age, with her grandfather and both her parents being involved within the fashion industry. From the age of four, Bae began to attend art school.

At age 15, she was the youngest student attending the Melbourne Whitehouse Institute of Design, graduating at the age of 17.

== Career ==
Bae had internships in New York with Marc Jacobs and Anna Sui.

Bae won the 2007 Tiffany & Co Young Designer of the Year Award and in 2009 was nominated for the Prix de Marie Claire Designer of the Year Award.

She has achieved international recognition through having her collections sold in the US, UK and UAE. Stockists have included Barneys and Henri Bendel of New York, Matches in London, Sace and Harvey Nichols in Dubai, and Satine.

In Australia, her collections are sold in Myer and she collaborated with Target Australia in October 2007 to design dress collections.

She has also been employed as a senior designer for the labels Saba and Charlie Brown and worked with Marcs.

Her label has been listed in publications that include Nylon, Russh, US Harpers, US Elle, Harpers Bazaar Dubai, Australian Vogue, Harpers Bazaar and Marie Claire.
