= Afef Jnifen =

Tunisian-born Italian actress, model and television presenter (born 1963)

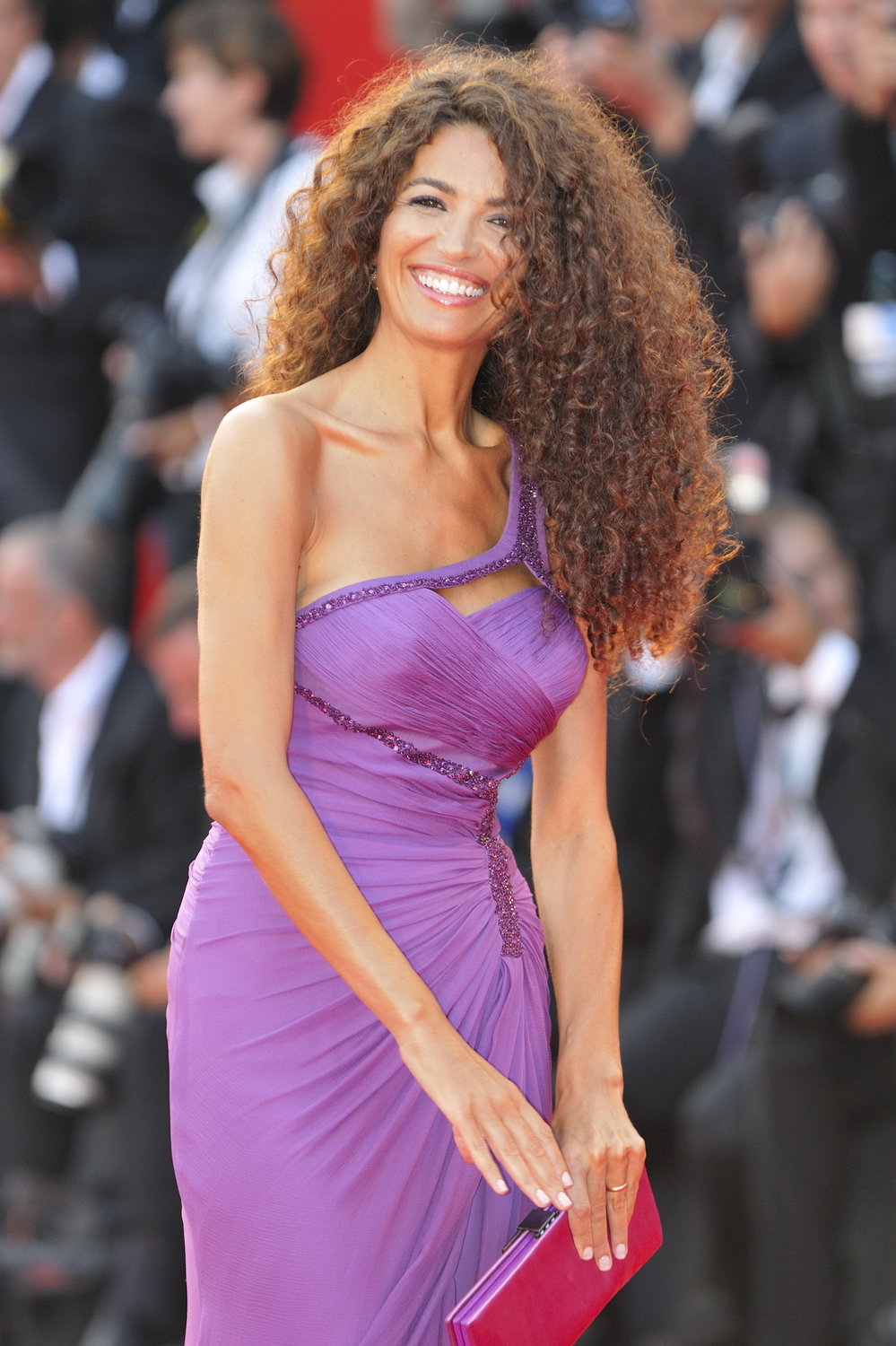
- Jnifen in 2009
- Born: 3 November 1963 (age 63); Ben Gardane, Tunisia
- Occupations: Fashion model; actress; television presenter
- Height: 176 cm (5 ft 9 in)
- Spouse(s): Marco Squatri (m. 1990; div. 2001) Marco Tronchetti Provera (m. 2001; div. 2018) Alessandro del Bono (m. 2021)

Afef Jnifen (Arabic: عفاف جنيفان; born 3 November 1963), also known mononymously as Afef, is a Tunisian-born Italian fashion model, actress and television presenter.

== Biography ==
Jnifen was born in 1963 in Ben Gardane, Tunisia, and was later naturalized Italian. She is the daughter of the former Tunisian diplomat Mohamed Jnifen, who was ambassador in Libya, Egypt, Saudi Arabia, Lebanon, Syria, Yemen, and Bahrain. Her mother, Saida Benina, is of Turkish origin.

Her modeling career began when she was discovered by photographer Jean-Paul Goude, who spotted her walking on the beach while he was shooting a Club Med ad with Carla Bruni in the Bahamas. Goude put Jnifen in the ad and suggested her to go to Paris and meet the designer Azzedine Alaïa. She quickly became a favorite model of many of Europe's top designers, travelling between Milan and Paris while working for Armani, Fendi, Jean Paul Gaultier, Roberto Cavalli, and others. Jnifen's career in fashion has since spanned three decades representing top international brands such as L'Oréal, Paris.

Jnifen became known to the Italian public as an hostess of the television program Maurizio Costanzo Show in 1982 on Canale 5. She hosted the television programs Quelli che... il calcio in 1993 on Rai 3, Scommettiamo che.... in 1999 with Fabrizio Frizzi on Rai 1, and La grande notte in 2006 with Gene Gnocchi on Rai 2. In 2006, she decided to take a step back from the public eye.

In 1999, she appeared in an episode of the series Il commissario Montalbano.

In 2016 and 2017, Jnifen starred in Project Runway Middle East on MBC as a jury member along with Lebanese designer Elie Saab and Egyptian actress Yousra. In 2017, she was named ambassador of "Fashion 4 Development". In 2018, she made a comeback in modeling.

== Personal life ==
Jnifen has been married four times, the first one was when she was young in Tunisia; the second from 1990 to 2001 to the lawyer Marco Squatri (one son together); The third from 2001 to 2018 to the businessman Marco Tronchetti Provera, chairman and CEO of Pirelli & C. S.p.A. and Telecom Italia; and the fourth since October 2021 to the businessman Alessandro del Bono.
