= Tamara Ralph =

Australian-British fashion designer

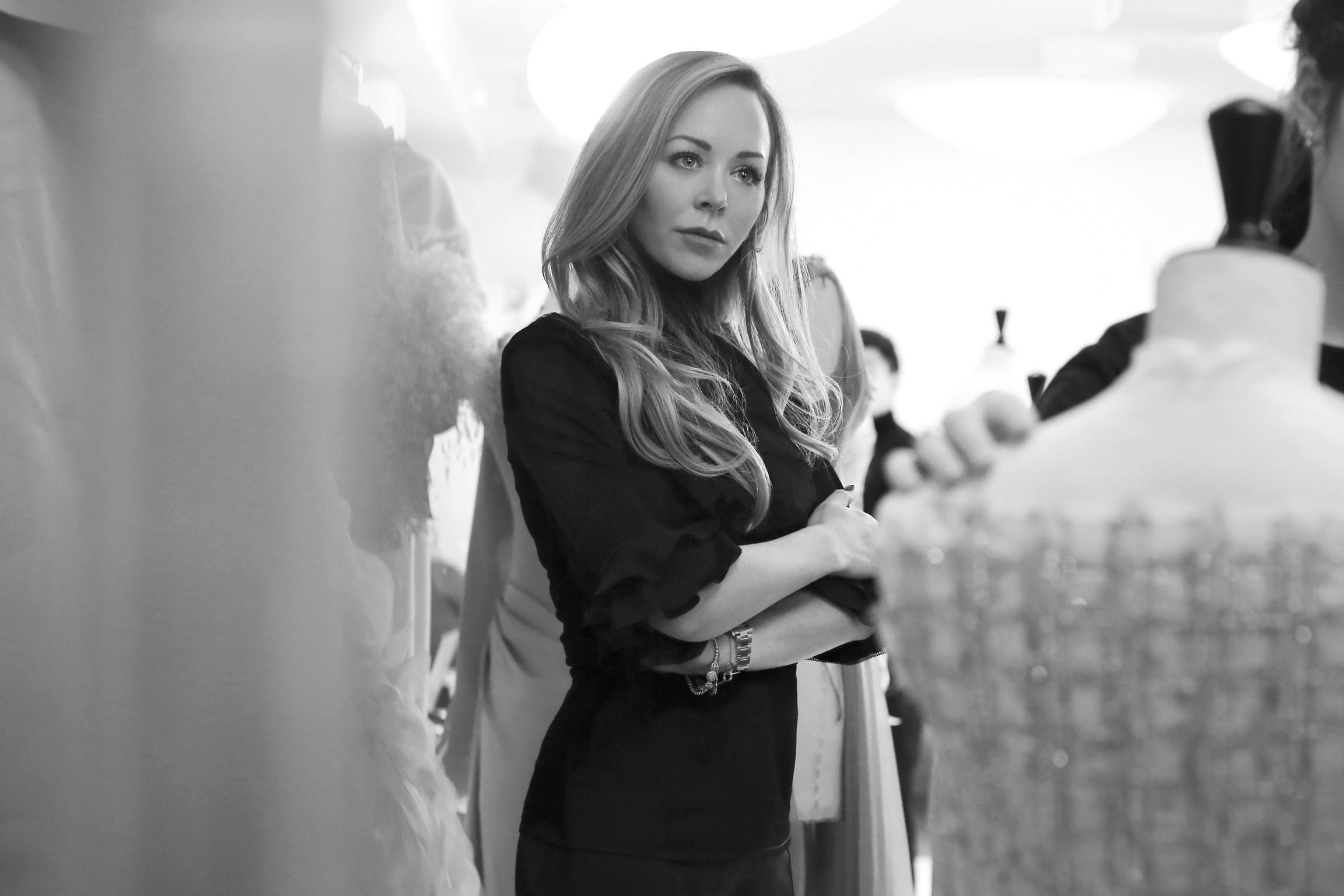
- Ralph in 2014
- Born: Tamara Miguel Ralph; 29 November 1981 (age 44); Sydney, Australia
- Education: Caringbah High School; Whitehouse Institute of Design
- Occupations: Creative Director & Co-founder
- Employer: Tamara Ralph
- Website: tamararalph.com

Tamara Miguel Ralph (born 29 November 1981) is an Australian fashion designer who is the former Creative Director and co-founder of Ralph & Russo. She is the founder of her eponymous label, Tamara Ralph.

== Early life and education ==
Ralph was born on 29 November 1981 in the Sutherland Shire and is the fourth generation in her family to work in couture and fashion design. After graduating from the Whitehouse Institute of Design in Melbourne, Australia, Ralph moved to London in hopes of breaking into the fashion industry.

== Career ==
In 2010, she founded a fashion house, Ralph & Russo with Michael Russo in Mayfair, London. The fashion house focused on the city's rich history of couture fashion houses. As a creative director, Ralph has designed high end clothing and accessories for celebrities including, Beyoncé, Rihanna, Angelina Jolie, Aishwarya Rai, Priyanka Chopra, Bella Hadid, and others. Ralph also designed the bespoke interior of Ralph & Russo boutiques.

Ralph collaborated with several other labels including Audemars Piguet, Disney, Linda Farrow, and others on different occasions. She has also designed Meghan Markle’s engagement dress for her marriage to Prince Harry.

She became the first female Creative Director from the UK in nearly 100 years deemed eligible to show during Paris Haute Couture week. She has been recognised by Vogue and Harper’s Bazaar for her achievements, together with her inclusion into fashion publications such as Fortune magazine's 40 under 40 list, the BOF 500 and in 2016 was awarded the "Outstanding Achievement Award" at the Walpole British Luxury Awards. She often appears at charity events and helped with 2019–20 Australian bushfire charity event and ‘To India, With Love’.

On June 30, 2021, Ralph (alongside Michael Russo) sold the operations and assets of Ralph & Russo to the US-based investment firm and holding company Retail Ecommerce Ventures after it had experienced funding issues in prior months.

In 2023, Ralph founded her eponymous luxury fashion brand, Tamara Ralph Couture. The inaugural collection was showcased at the AW23-24 Paris Haute Couture Week.

== Personal life ==
Ralph was previously in a relationship with her business partner Michael Russo. Since 2020, Ralph has been in a relationship with British-Indian businessman Bhanu Choudhrie. They have one child together, who was born in 2021.
