= Projecto Moda =

- Created by: Eli Holzman
- Starring: Nayma Mingas; Paulo Gomes; Manuel Alves; Fátima Cotta; Cristina Pinho
- Country of origin: Portugal
- No. of episodes: 10

Production
- Running time: 60 minutes

Original release
- Network: RTP1
- Release: July 25 – September 26, 2010

Projecto Moda ("Project Fashion") is a Portuguese reality competition TV show that ran for one season, from 25 July to 26 September 2010, on public network RTP1. It is the Portuguese installment of the Project Runway franchise.

The host of the show was Nayma Mingas, a former model. Paulo Gomes was the mentor. Manuel Alves, a fashion designer, and Fátima Cotta, the director of Elle Magazine Portugal, were the judges for the season. The other permanent judge was Cristina Pinho, a spokesperson from Modalfa, a Portuguese fashion store. The show had 10 contestants, and only two finalists. The show had 10 episodes that aired weekly.

== Contestants ==
=== Designers ===
The 10 designers in season 1 are:

Contestant	Age	Hometown	Place Finished
Vanda Dias Ferreira	25	Póvoa de Santa Iria	10th
Joana Matos	24	Celorico de Baixo	9th
Ana Brito	32	Lisboa	8th
Rosina Almeida	39	Guarda	7th
João Valente	28	Porto	6th
André Amorim	23	Santa Maria da Feira	5th
André Saraiva	19	Peso da Régua	4th
Vera Couto	28	Almada	3rd
Pedro Reis	30	Braga	2nd
Carina Duarte	24	Seixal	1st

=== Models ===
The 10 models in season 1 are:

Contestant	Age
Carla	21
Elisabete	19
Francisca	16
Inês	21
Joana	19
Júlia	20
Maria	16
Matilde	17
Silvia	22
Telma	21

== Challenges ==
Designer Elimination Chart
Designer	1	2	3	4	5^{1}	6	7^{2}	8 ^{3}	10	Episodes
Carina	IN	WIN	HIGH	HIGH	WIN	LOW	HIGH	WIN	WINNER	10 - Finalistas
Pedro	WIN	HIGH	HIGH	WIN	IN	WIN	WIN	IN	OUT	10 - Finalistas
Vera	HIGH	IN	WIN	HIGH	WIN	IN	IN	OUT		8 - Ícones Mundiais da Música
André	IN	LOW	IN	IN	LOW	IN	OUT			7 - Não há duas sem três
Amorim	IN	LOW	LOW	IN	IN	OUT				6 - Moda de Estimação
João	IN	IN	LOW	LOW	OUT					5 - Volta ao Mundo em 48 Horas
Rosina	LOW	IN	IN	OUT						4 - Fardas Futuristas
Ana	IN	IN	OUT							3 - Saída de Praia
Joana	HIGH	OUT								2 - Supermercado
Vanda	OUT									1 - Preto no Branco

- ^Note 1: Although this was not a team challenge, the judges considered that both designers had outfits, that were good enough to be considered winners.
- ^Note 2: Although this was a team challenge the designers were evaluated individually. In this episode there was not a bottom two.
- ^Note 3: The judges did not split the group into "high" or "low" scorers. Hence, there was no winner; designers either advanced to finale or were eliminated.

Results
Green background and WINNER means the designer won Projecto Moda.
Blue background and WIN means the designer won that challenge.
Light blue background and HIGH means the designer had one of the highest scores for that challenge, but did not win.
Pink background and LOW means the designer had one of the lowest scores for that challenge, but was not eliminated.
Orange background and LOW means the designer was in the bottom two, but was not eliminated;
Red background and OUT means the designer lost and was out of the competition.

== Episode Summary ==
=== Episode 1: Preto no Branco ===
Original Airdate: July 25, 2010

The designers were asked to create a dress for Vicky Fernandes, who was considered many times one of the most beautiful women in Portugal. However, there was a twist. The designers couldn't select the fabric of their dresses, Instead they took two samples of fabric out of a bag without looking at it. They were preassigned models for their challenge, given 30 minutes to sketch their design, and three days to complete the outfit. The winner has immunity for the next challenge and cannot be eliminated.

- Judges: Nayma Mingas; Manuel Alves; Fátima Cotta; Cristina Pinho and Vicky Fernandes.
- WINNER: Pedro
- OUT: Vanda

=== Episode 2: Supermercado ===
Original Airdate: August 1, 2010

The designers were asked to create an outfit made only from materials bought at a supermarket. They had a budget of €60, 1 hour to make their purchases and one day to complete the outfit. The winner has immunity for the next challenge and cannot be eliminated.

- Judges: Nayma Mingas; Manuel Alves; Fátima Cotta; Cristina Pinho and Ricardo Araújo Pereira.
- WINNER: Carina
- OUT: Joana

=== Episode 3: Saída de Praia ===
Original Airdate: August 8, 2010

The designers had to create an outfit with a beach theme. They are given two minutes to collect provided fabrics hanging from clotheslines in a storeroom, and only one day to complete the outfit. The winner has immunity for the next challenge and cannot be eliminated.

- Judges: Nayma Mingas; Manuel Alves; Fátima Cotta; Cristina Pinho and Carlos Ramos.
- WINNER: Vera
- OUT: Ana

=== Episode 4: Farda Futurista ===
Original Airdate: August 15, 2010

The designers had to create a uniform of the future, for the employees of Modalfa (the official sponsor of Projecto Moda). The fabrics were provided and each designer chose one at a random order. The winner has immunity for the next challenge and cannot be eliminated.

- Judges: Nayma Mingas; Manuel Alves; Fátima Cotta; Cristina Pinho and Pedro Mourão.
- WINNER: Pedro
- OUT: Rosina

=== Episode 5: Volta ao Mundo em 48 Horas ===
Original Airdate: August 22, 2010

- Judges: Nayma Mingas; Manuel Alves; Fátima Cotta; Cristina Pinho and Catarina Furtado.
- WINNER: Carina and Vera
- OUT: João

=== Episode 6: Moda de Estimação ===
Original Airdate: August 29, 2010

- Judges: Nayma Mingas; Manuel Alves; Fátima Cotta; Cristina Pinho and Dino Alves.
- WINNER: Pedro
- OUT: Amorim

=== Episode 7: Não há duas sem três ===
Original Airdate: September 5, 2010

- Judges: Nayma Mingas; José Manuel Gonçalves (sitting in for Manuel Alves); Fátima Cotta; Cristina Pinho and Manuel Serrão.
- WINNER: Pedro
- OUT: André

=== Episode 8: Ícones Mundiais da Música ===
Original Airdate: September 12, 2010

Designer	Music Icon
Carina	Björk
Pedro	Lady Gaga
Vera	Madonna

- Judges: Nayma Mingas; Manuel Alves; Fátima Cotta; Cristina Pinho and Guta Moura Guedes.
- ADVANCED: Carina and Pedro
- OUT: Vera

=== Episode 9: Best Of ===
Original Airdate: September 19, 2010

Episode 9, was the recap episode.

=== Episode 10: Finale ===
Original Airdate: September 26, 2010

- Judges: Nayma Mingas; Manuel Alves; Fátima Cotta; Cristina Pinho and Paulo Gomes.
- WINNER: Carina
- OUT: Pedro
