= Project Runway Australia season 3 =

Project Runway Australia
- Season 3
- Starring: Megan Gale; Alex Perry; Kirrily Johnston; Jarrad Clark
- No. of episodes: 11

Release
- Original network: Arena
- Original release: 4 July – 12 September 2011

Season chronology
- ← Previous; Season 2 Next → Season 4

Project Runway Australia 3 is the third season of the reality competition Project Runway Australia, airing on Arena. It premiered on 4 July 2011.

== Overview ==
Several changes have been made to the judging panel this season. It was announced on 10 January that model and actress Megan Gale will replace Kristy Hinze as host and main judge. Fashion designer Kirrily Johnston and Global Production Director of IMG Fashion Jarrad Clark make up the new judging panel. Henry Roth has also been replaced as design mentor by fashion designer and Australia's Next Top Model judge Alex Perry.

== Contestants ==
Name	Age	Place of residence	Place finished
Anthony Allars	34	New South Wales	12th
Amanda McKenna	36	Western Australia	11th
Timothy Godbold	42	Western Australia	10th/9th
Anna McEachran	31	Western Australia	10th/9th
Claire Hocking	24	Victoria	8th
Rachael Perks	21	New South Wales	7th
Gabrielle Stephens	40	Victoria	6th
Matcho Suba	23	New South Wales	5th
Nerida Bourne	21	New South Wales	4th (Originally 8th)
Johnny Schembri	23	New South Wales	3rd
Craig Braybrook	45	Victoria	Runner-up
Dylan Cooper	21	New South Wales	Winner

Models

- Hannah Ubl
- Mary Vitinaros
- Jenna Hall
- Alicia Kromodomos
- Samantha Howard
- Flora Blaik
- Milica Vujic
- Cheyney Belle
- Holly Lee Boorman
- Sahara Deng
- Floral Lin Yang
- Cailin Moore

== Challenges ==
Designer Elimination Progress
Designer	1	2	3	4^{1}	5	6^{2}	7	8	9	Finale	
Dylan	HIGH	HIGH	IN	WIN	HIGH	WIN	LOW	LOW	LOW	WIN	WINNER
Craig	LOW	WIN	IN	HIGH	HIGH	LOW	LOW	WIN	HIGH	HIGH	RUNNER UP
Johnny	WIN	HIGH	HIGH	LOW	WIN	WIN	LOW	HIGH	WIN	HIGH	OUT
Nerida	IN	HIGH	IN	OUT		IN	WIN	LOW	OUT		
Matcho	LOW	IN	LOW	HIGH	LOW	HIGH	LOW	OUT			
Gabrielle	HIGH	IN	IN	HIGH	IN	LOW	OUT				
Rachael	IN	IN	HIGH	LOW	LOW	OUT					
Claire	IN	IN	WIN	LOW	OUT	OUT					
Anna	IN	IN	OUT			OUT					
Timothy	IN	LOW	OUT			WD					
Amanda	IN	OUT									
Anthony	OUT										

The designer won the competition
The designer won the challenge
The designer was eliminated
The designer had a high score for the challenge
The designer came in second but did not win the challenge
The designer was in the top two, or the first to be announced as a high scoring designer
The designer had a low score for the challenge
The designer was in the bottom two
The designer withdrew from the competition
The designer was brought back into the competition

^Note 1: Although Gabrielle and Dylan were the winning team, Dylan was announced as the overall winner of the challenge.
^Note 2: The 4 most recently eliminated designers were brought back for the challenge, and Nerida won a place back in the competition

== Episode summary ==
=== Episode one ===
Original airdate: 4 July 2011

The first challenge of the season required the designers to create a cocktail dress utilizing three different fabrics of the same colour. The designers did not get to choose their own fabrics, and their colour scheme was based on the colour of the dress their model was wearing.

- Guest Judge Camilla Franks
- Winner: Johnny Schembri
- Out: Anthony Allars

=== Episode two ===
Original airdate: 11 July 2011

Alex introduced the designers to Dannii Minogue and Tabitha Somerset-Webb, who tasked them with creating an evening look for their label, Project D. The winner of the challenge will have their design manufactured and sold with Project D's Spring/Summer 2011 collection.

- Guest Judges Dannii Minogue & Tabitha Somerset-Webb
- Winner: Craig Braybrook
- Out: Amanda McKenna

=== Episode three ===
Original airdate: 18 July 2011

The designers were taken to a wharf, where they had three minutes to choose items of second-hand clothing from a pile consisting of over 16,000 pieces to use as the materials for their challenge, which was to create a modern daywear look. However, they did not get to work with the items they chose, passing their clothing to the person on their left instead. At judging, Megan announced that two designers would be eliminated.

- Guest Judge Terry Biviano
- Winner: Claire Hocking
- Out: Anna McEachran & Timothy Godbold

=== Episode four ===
Original airdate: 25 July 2011

Working in pairs, the designers were tasked with creating two looks influenced by the various collections of iconic Australian designer Carla Zampatti over the 1960s, 1970s, 1980s and 1990s. The teams chose their own team leaders and had two days for the challenge. During the second day, Alex announced that one piece of clothing from each pair had to be made out of denim.

Team leader	Partner	Decade
Craig	Matcho	1960s
Gabrielle	Dylan	1970s
Nerida	Rachael	1980s
Johnny	Claire	1990s

- Guest Judge Carla Zampatti
- Winner: Dylan Cooper
- Out: Nerida Bourne

=== Episode five ===
Original airdate: 1 August 2011

This week, the designers were reunited with their loved ones for their challenge. Each designer had to create a glamorous, 'million dollar' look for one of their competitors' relatives. Family members randomly selected the designer they would work with.

Designer	Client
Claire	Dylan's mother
Craig	Rachael's sister
Dylan	Johnny's sister
Gabrielle	Matcho's sister in law
Johnny	Claire's mother
Matcho	Craig's mother
Rachael	Gabrielle's step sister

- Guest Judge Claudia Navone
- Winner: Johnny Schembri
- Out: Claire Hocking

=== Episode six ===
Original Airdate: 8 August 2011

The remaining designers were flown to the Gold Coast for inspiration for their next challenge. Designers were split into pairs in order to create two resort wear looks inspired by the Gold Coast. Anna, Timothy, Nerida & Claire (the four most recently eliminated designers) were brought back and told that one of them would win a place back in the competition.

Teams
Craig & Gabrielle
Johnny & Dylan
Matcho & Rachael
Claire & Anna
Nerida & Timothy*

- Timothy voluntarily left the competition midway through the challenge, leaving Nerida to create only one look for the runway.

Johnny & Dylan's designs receive the most praise and won the challenge, Nerida's outfit was deemed the best of the returnees and was back in the competition, Claire's outfit was deemed the worst and Anna receive some praise but her fit let her down, Matcho's outfit was deemed the best he's done but Rachael's was heavily criticized both for construction and design, Gabrielle's construction receive praise but her colour choice was deemed boring and Craig's outfit was criticized for not being fashion forward. Craig was given another chance while Rachael was eliminated.

- Winner: Johnny Schembri & Dylan Cooper
- Back into The Competition: Nerida Bourne
- Out: Rachael Perks

=== Episode seven ===
Original Airdate: 15 August 2011

Alex informed the designers that they would be creating a look for glamorous, internationally known Australian celebrity. It was then revealed that their client was host and head judge Megan Gale. The outfit for Megan had to be suitable for an event.

- Guest Judge Camilla Freeman-Topper
- Winner: Nerida Bourne
- Out: Gabrielle Stephens

=== Episode eight ===
Original Airdate: 22 August 2011

The remaining designers were challenged with re-designing a well known red carpet fashion disaster into a fashionable evening look, using the fabrics and materials of the outfit they chose.

Designer	Red Carpet Disaster
Craig	Whoopi Goldberg (1993 Academy Awards)
Dylan	Björk (2001 Academy Awards)
Johnny	Britney Spears (2001 American Music Awards)
Matcho	Celine Dion (1999 Academy Awards)
Nerida	Cher (1986 Academy Awards)

- Guest Judges
- Winner: Craig Braybrook
- Out: Matcho Suba

=== Episode nine ===
Original Airdate: 29 August 2011

It is the final challenge and the last chance for the four remaining designers to prove they are worthy of a place at Melbourne Fashion Week. Alex takes them to the Melbourne Fashion Festival's runway to give them their final challenge. They have two days to create an haute couture gown worthy of the runways of Paris, New York and Milan.

- Guest Judges: Collette Dinnigan
- Winner: Johnny Schembri
- Out: Nerida Bourne
- Final Three: Johnny Schembri, Craig Braybrook, Dylan Cooper

=== Episode ten ===
Original Airdate: 6 September 2011

The final three have been selected and they now face their final challenge: create a collection of 10 designs which will be showcased at a live fashion show in front of their fashion industry peers. They have is a budget of $10,000, and two months to put the collection together. Alex pays each designer a home visit to offer them support and his expert advice on their collections. Once they return to Melbourne to prepare the finale, Alex breaks the news that they have one more challenge to conquer, straight out of the pages of Madison magazine.

=== Episode eleven ===
Original Airdate: 13 September 2011

It's the final countdown to the runway, and every second counts as the final three cast and fit models for their shows, and race to complete their garments in time.

- Winner: Dylan Cooper
- Runner-up: Craig Braybrook
- 3rd Place: Johnny Schembri
