= Project Runway Australia season 1 =

Project Runway Australia
- Season 1
- Starring: Kristy Hinze; Henry Roth; Sarah Gale; Jayson Brunsdon
- No. of episodes: 10

Release
- Original network: Arena
- Original release: 7 July – 15 September 2008

Season chronology
- Next → Season 2

The first season of Project Runway Australia began production in May, and the season premiered on Arena 8.30pm (AEST) Monday 7 July 2008. The host was Australian model Kristy Hinze and the judges were Sarah Gale and Jayson Brunsdon. Henry Roth was the designer's mentor. The season concluded on 15 September 2008, with Juli Grbac being announced the winner.

The prizes for the winner of Project Runway Australia included what was described as "$100,000 opportunity" to create their own fashion line to show in Melbourne Fashion Week, a Fiat 500 car, and having their clothes displayed in a six-page spread in Madison magazine.

== Contestants ==
Name	Age	Place of residence	Place finished
Alison Davis	21	West Pennant Hills, Sydney, New South Wales	12th
Deborah Pak	35	Sydney, New South Wales	11th
Sophie Spalding	22	Adelaide, South Australia	10th
Oren Nuri	29	Bondi, Sydney, New South Wales	9th
Shane Garland	41	Sydney, New South Wales	8th
Mark Antonio	22	Brighton-Le-Sands, Sydney, New South Wales	7th
Helen Manuell	38	Malvern, Melbourne, Victoria	6th
Brent Zaicek	32	Sydney, New South Wales (originally from New Zealand)	5th
Lui Hon	33	Melbourne, Victoria	4th
Petrova Hammond	27	Caulfield North, Melbourne, Victoria	2nd runner-up
Leigh Buchanan	31	Brisbane, Queensland	runner-up
Juli Grbac	29	Brisbane, Queensland	winner

== Models ==
(in order of elimination)

- Tiya Adem
- Alex
- Natalie Pemberton
- Katerina
- Melissa Riemer
- Adelaide Rochford
- Sarah Watson
- Natalia Strzelczyk
- Anelise
- Anthea Crebbin
- Yumika Hoskin (runner-up)
- Lucy Mcintosh (winner)

== Progress ==
Designer Elimination Progress
Designer	1	2	3	4	5^{1}	6	7	8	9	10	11
Juli	IN	IN	HIGH	WIN	LOW	LOW	WIN	HIGH	HIGH	ADV	WINNER
Leigh	WIN	IN	IN	IN	HIGH	HIGH	LOW	LOW	WIN	ADV	RUNNER-UP
Petrova	HIGH	HIGH	LOW	IN	OUT	RET	HIGH	WIN	LOW	ADV	3RD PLACE
Lui	IN	IN	IN	HIGH	WIN	HIGH	LOW	LOW	OUT		
Brent	LOW	HIGH	WIN	LOW	HIGH	LOW	HIGH	OUT			
Helen	IN	LOW	HIGH	HIGH	HIGH	WIN	OUT				
Mark	IN	WIN	LOW	LOW	LOW	OUT					
Shane	HIGH	IN	WIN	OUT							
Oren	LOW	IN	OUT								
Sophie	IN	LOW	OUT								
Deborah	IN	OUT									
Alison	OUT										

The designer won Project Runway.
The designer won that challenge.
The designer was in the top two, or the first to be announced as a high scoring designer.
The designer had one of the highest scores for that challenge.
The designer had one of the lowest scores for that challenge.
The designer was in the bottom two.
The designer lost and was out of the competition.
The designer was brought back.
The designer advanced to Fashion Week.

^Note 1: Brent won immunity before judging.
^Note 2: Petrova re-entered the competition due to being Helen's model for week 6 and Helen having the winning design.

== Episodes ==
=== Episode 1 ===
The premiere episode of Project Runway Australia kicked off with the twelve designers introducing themselves. After being introduced to Kristie and Henry, the designers were told that their first challenge would involve using materials draped around the entrance of the Whitehouse Institute of Design to create a glamorous evening dress that represented who they were as a designer. They were also told that the Whitehouse Institute of Design was located 3 kilometres away and that the first person to reach there would get the best pick of materials. The guest judge for this episode was Karen Webster, the director of L'oreal Melbourne Fashion Festival.

- Judges: Kristie Hinze, Sarah Gale, Jayson Brunsdon
- Guest Judge: Karen Webster
- WINNER: Leigh
- OUT: Alison
- First Aired: 7 July 2008

=== Episode 2 ===
In this episode, Henry brought the designers to St. Kilda's Beach to draw inspiration from the beach for the Australian lifestyle of hanging out at the beach and partying at bars in the night. The designers had to create a garment that was versatile enough to be used at the beach and at the bar as well. For this task, they had 7 hours in the work room.

- Judges: Kristie Hinze, Sarah Gale, Jayson Brunsdon
- Guest Judge: Camille Frank
- WINNER: Mark
- OUT: Deborah
- First Aired: 14 July 2008

=== Episode 3 ===
Henry took the designers to a racetrack, where he revealed that the designers would be getting their materials out of the back of the cars. With these, they had to make a sporty, yet racy separates garment from the car parts found in the back of the car. This was also a team task, therefore a double elimination. Though one might assume this meant one team would be eliminated, it did not. The two lowest scoring teams both lost a designer, resulting in the elimination of Sophie, who was partnered with Petrova, and Oren, who had been partnered with Mark. The teams this episode were:

- **Mark** & Oren
- **Juli** & Helen
- **Sophie** & Petrova
- **Leigh** & Lui
- **Brent** & Shane
- Judges: Kristie Hinze, Sarah Gale, Jayson Brunsdon
- Guest Judge: Claudia Navone
- WINNER: **Brent** and Shane
- OUT: **Sophie** and Oren
- First Aired: 21 July 2008

Note: Bold represents team leaders.

=== Episode 4 ===
In the morning, the designers are driven to the MCG where they are greeted by Kristie Hinze. At first believe they are to create menswear as of the choice of the setting. However, this is soon disproven as they are shown their models for this task. They are given 20 minutes to be given a brief by the women of what they would like to wear to the Brownlow Medal awards; this is their task. After the brief the designers are given 250 AUD to purchase materials for their designs. As they begin constructing the gowns, Lui is seen to have trouble in getting started because he is not too sure of his design. Towards the end of the given time, most designers are frantic in trying to complete their design. Lui's fears of being eliminated were dismissed as his design turns out to please the client. At the elimination, Juli, Helen and Lui's designs are praised by the judges and Mark and Shane are in the bottom two. Mark is in the bottom two because of the inability to create a good finish to a complicated design and Shane for a boring design and did not stand out. Shane is eventually eliminated.

- Judges: Kristie Hinze, Sarah Gale, Jayson Brunsdon
- Guest Judge: Peter Morrissey
- WINNER: Juli
- OUT: Shane
- First Aired: 28 July 2008

=== Episode 5 ===
The designers have to design an outfit that is not only an individual piece but also fits into a collection. The designs were to be inspired by the European fashion in the 60s and use a similar colour palette to the colours in the new Loreal make up collection, Angelic. The designers had a joint budget of $1,000 to spend but only 3 people could choose the fabrics. Mark, Petrova and Helen are selected by the group to choose the fabrics. Mark was unable to get the correct material for Juli and ends up having to use a salmon pink polyester instead. Juli not only doesn't like the material but is not confident of her overall design. The designers were told by Henry that they were going to attend an industry party where they had to impress Sophie Falkner. The winner of the challenge would be featured in Confidential in the Daily Telegraph and have immunity. The designers were accompanied by their models who were wearing their designs. Leigh was also excited by the party as it was also his birthday. The next day, the girls went up to the guys apartment to see who the winner was. After quickly skimming through The Daily Telegraph, the designers reach the Confidential section and see a picture of Brent and his model. Brent receives immunity at the next runway challenge. Brent, Leigh and Lui's garment receive praise but Mark, Helen, Petrova and Juli's garments are poorly received. After deliberation, Lui is announced as the winner and the final two are Juli and Petrova. Juli is told by the judges to take responsibility for her actions after she stated that she wasn't happy with the fabric and the overall design; and Petrova's gown did not match the overall collection, did not match the colour palette and didn't match the correct time period. Ultimately, Petrova is eliminated.

- Judges: Kristie Hinze, Sarah Gale, Jayson Brunsdon
- Guest Judge: Karen Webster
- WINNER: Lui
- OUT: Petrova
- First Aired: 4 August 2008

=== Episode 6 ===
The designers had to design a tailored look for winter using only white fabrics. The designers models were the eliminated designers and the eliminated designer paired with the winning designer for the runway challenge would be brought back into the competition. Lui, Leigh and Helen performed well but Juli and Mark's outfits were criticised. Ultimately, Helen was chosen as the winner and allowed for Petrova to re-enter the competition. For the second week in a row, Juli is in the bottom two along with Mark. The judges criticised Juli for not embracing her models figure and they criticised Mark's outfit as it was not flattering nor stylish. Ultimately, Mark was out.

- Judges: Kristie Hinze, Sarah Gale, Jayson Brunsdon
- Guest Judge: Arthur Galan
- WINNER: Helen
- OUT: Mark
- ENTER: Petrova
- First Aired: 11 August 2008

=== Episode 7 ===
This episode, there is a special celebrity guest: Kelly Rowland. The designers are to design an outfit for Kelly Rowland to wear on stage while performing. The brief is for an edgy but classy look. After the designers hear this, they all become ecstatic, although Helen does not know who Kelly Rowland is. They are given 30 minutes to sketch the design and later are given 300 AUD to buy fabrics. During this, Lui had gotten to the black fringes first and due to limited quantity, there are no more left after he had taken them. Unfortunately Leigh had also chosen to use black fringes, but is forced to change colour. While they are making the outfits, they are surprised by Kelly Rowland coming in and giving her opinions on their designs. Kelly had told Helen that her design was slightly too 'cheap' looking because of some attached feathers and lace. While talking to Leigh about his design, she mentions her dislike of fringes, which causes Lui to become distressed because his whole design is covered in fringes. After this, Lui decides to take a risk and creates a whole new outfit in one hour and Helen removes the feathers. At judging, Brent, Juli and Petrova's designs are praised and Leigh, Helen and Lui's designs are not. Eventually Helen is eliminated because of the cheapness of the look and the height of the dress was a bit too revealing.

- Judges: Kristie Hinze, Sarah Gale, Jayson Brunsdon
- Guest judge: Kelly Rowland
- WINNER: Juli
- OUT: Helen
- First aired: 18 August 2008

=== Episode 8 ===
In this episode the designers were told now it is time to get to the serious side of fashion. The challenge was to design for the commercial market and design for Myer's Basque line of clothing. The winner of the challenge would have their design manufactured and sold by the Basque label. The contestants were given 30 minutes to sketch and 5 minutes with Judy Coomber, the guest judge, to go over their designs. With 15 minutes and 100 AUD the designs had to get their fabric choices. During the sewing portion of the show Leigh had a bit of a stress out about his mistake of getting brown instead of his intended black material. Midway through the challenge the designers were told to take their models and unfinished garments outside and ask random people on the street for their opinions. Then Judy came into the studio and commented on the garments and designs. On the runway Juli and Petrova were given high marks, with Petrova as the winner. The other three Lui, Leigh and Brent were the low scorers and Brent was sent home.

- Judges: Kristie Hinze, Sarah Gale, Jayson Brunsdon
- Guest Judge: Judy Coomber, Merchandise Director for Fashion and Beauty for Myer
- WINNER: Petrova
- OUT: Brent
- First Aired: 25 August 2008

=== Episode 9 ===
In this episode the designers were driven to a church in a luxury car. The challenge was initially, to create a wedding dress which could be used as a final, show stopping dress on any runway. The contestants were given 30 minutes and 500 AUD to choose their fabrics. All four designers were finding this task extremely difficult, especially Petrova, who had an incident with hot glue, which caused her dress to become blotchy. Midway through the challenge, Henry entered the workroom with four eliminated models and some fabrics, and told the designers that they also needed to create a bridesmaids dress to accompany the wedding dress. On the runway Juli was given high marks, with Leigh as the winner. Petrova and Lui produced low scoring dresses, with Lui being sent home.

- Judges: Kristie Hinze, Sarah Gale, Jayson Brunsdon
- Guest Judge: Karen Webster
- WINNER: Leigh
- OUT: Lui
- First Aired: 1 September 2008

=== Episode 10 ===
The three remaining designers are each given a budget of $10,000 (AUD) and two months to prepare a ten look collection. Mentor Henry Roth visits the designers at their homes and workshops to provide guidance on their progress.

The designers return to Melbourne and the Whitehouse Institute of Design to prepare to show their collections.

Editor of Madison Magazine Paula Joye (and guest judge for the finale) visits the designers to critique their looks.

Henry tells the designers that there is one final surprise, and leads them blindfolded to another room ending the episode on a cliffhanger.

=== Episode 11 ===
After showing their collections on the runway, Petrova was eliminated, followed by Leigh, making Juli the winner of Project Runway Australia.

- WINNER: Juli
- OUT: Petrova and Leigh
- First Aired: 15 September 2008
