= Nayma Mingas =

Angolan model

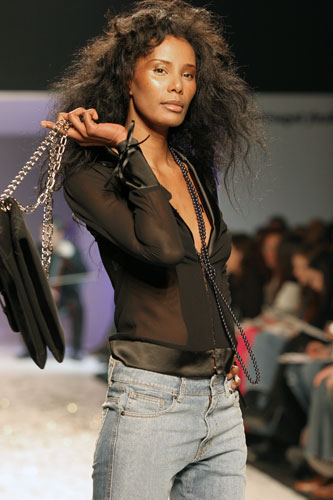
- Born: January 25, 1974 (age 52); Lisbon, Portugal
- Occupation: Model
- Parent(s): Ruy Mingas (father); Julieta Cristina da Silva Branco Lima (mother)

Cláudia Carina Branco Lima Rodrigues Mingas, known artistically as Nayma Mingas (born 25 January 1974) is an Angolan-Portuguese former model, voice actress, and television personality.

== Biography ==
Mingas was born in 1974 in Lisbon. She is the daughter of singer, writer of the Angolan national anthem, and former ambassador to Portugal Ruy Mingas and his wife Julieta Cristina da Silva Branco Lima. She began her work as a model in Portugal, and has since done shows in Spain, Brazil, France, Germany, and Austria. She recorded a version of "Amor" by Heróis do Mar with the MDA project. In 2004, she published her first book, Nayma - A Arte de um rosto perfeito with the publisher Dom Quixote.

In 2010, Mingas was invited to voice Princess Tiana in the Portuguese translation of the Disney film The Princess and the Frog. That same year, she hosted Projecto Moda, the Portuguese version of Project Runway. In 2017, she was on the front cover of Máxima with Amilna Estêvão.

As of 2014, Mingas splits her time between her home in Luanda, Angola and Portugal, and is private about her personal life. She is divorced from journalist Luís Costa Branco.

== Awards ==
- 2010 - Divas Angola (Angola)
- 2008 - Prestige Award (Angola / Portugal)
- 2006 - Central FM, "Model of the Year" (Portugal)
- 2005 - Procópio Fashion (Portugal)
- 2004 - Fashion TV, "Best Runway Model"
- 2003 - "Sexier Publicity" - Campanha chocolate Jubileu (England)
- 2002 - Tropical "Model of the year" (Angola)
- 1999 - Montemor Fashion, "Model of the year" (Portugal)
- 1997 - NG, "Model of the Year" (Portugal)
- 1996 - NG, "Model of the Year" (Portugal)
- 1996 - Aiwé, "Prestige Award / Model of the Year" (PALOP community in Europe)
- 1993 - Oh Lisboa!, "Top 10 / Model" (Portugal)

== Bibliography ==
- Mingas, Nayma (2004). Nayma: A Arte de um Rosto Perfeito (in Portuguese). Lisbon: Dom Quixote. ISBN 972-20-2752-2.
