= Juli Grbac =

Australian fashion designer

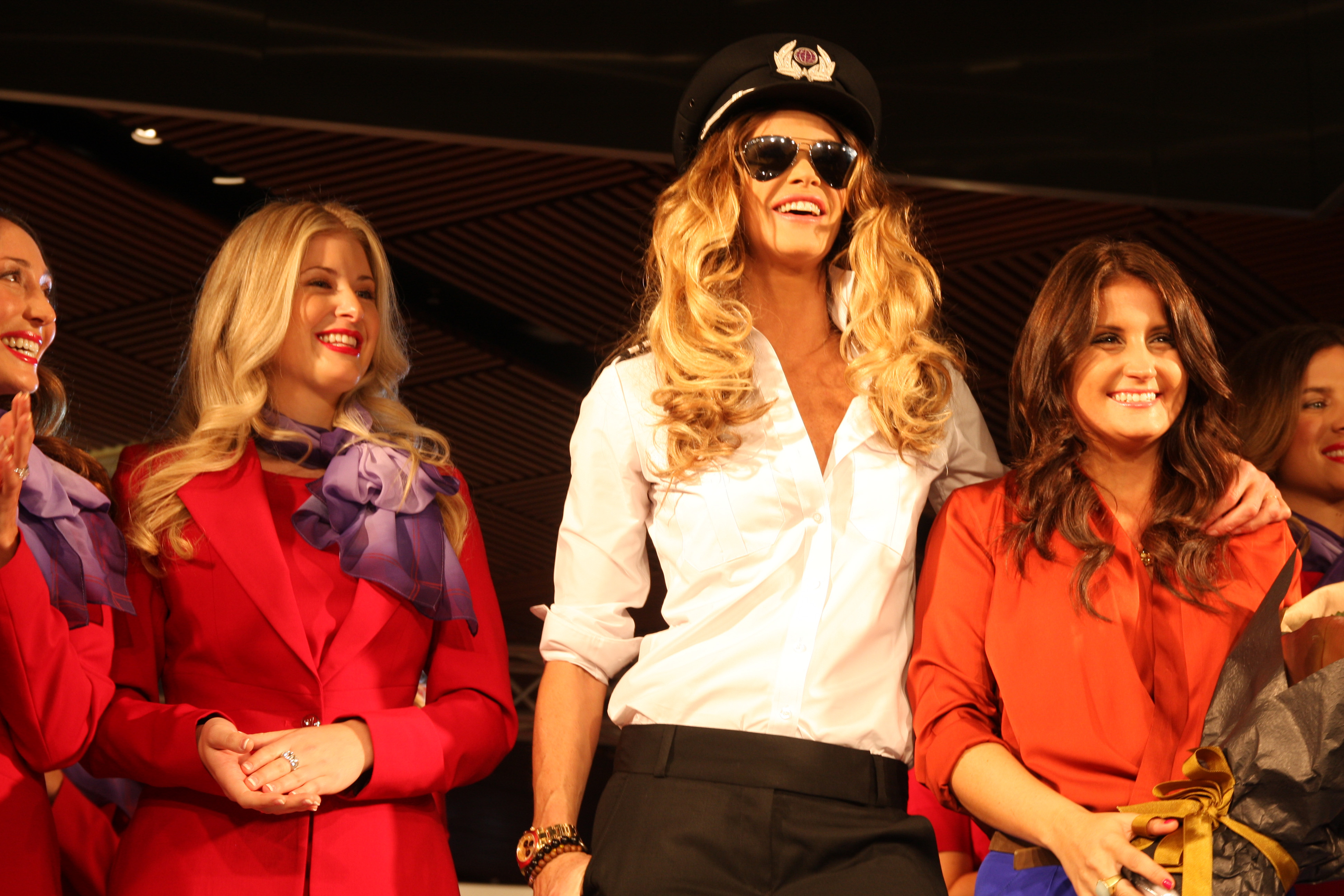
- Juli Grbac (right) with Elle Macpherson (center) launches the new Virgin Blue airline uniform in 2011
- Born: Julijana Grbac; 1978 (age 47-48); Brisbane, Australia
- Education: Central Saint Martins
- Occupation: Fashion designer
- Television: Project Runway Australia (season 1)

Julijana Grbac (born 1978), commonly called Juli Grbac, is an Australian fashion designer who was the first winner of Project Runway Australia.

== Early life ==
Hailing from Brisbane, Grbac developed a love of fashion at a young age and was taught to sew by her mother, who also worked as a dressmaker. Grbac studied fashion design at Gateway TAFE in Brisbane, and then at London's Central Saint Martins. Upon her return from London, she worked as a hand sewer for various companies, including luxury brand Easton and Pearson.

== Career ==
In 2002, she started her own label "Grbac" and was stocked in some of Australia's most high end retail stores including Jean Brown Robe. Grbac also opened a stand-alone store in the TC Beirne Centre in Fortitude Valley's Brunswick Street Mall, which closed two years later.

In 2008 Grbac competed in, and won, the first season of Project Runway Australia. Her most famous dress on the show was the one she created for singer Kelly Rowland in episode 7. Rowland went on to wear the custom-made dress at a concert for Prince Albert of Monaco in Cannes, France.

As part her Project Runway Australia prize, Grbac had her designs modelled at the L'Oréal Melbourne Fashion Week in 2009, which received rave reviews, as well as a 6-page spread in Madison magazine.

In 2011, Grbac re-designed the uniform of the airline Virgin Australia. She took inspiration from "the glamour of flying in the 1960s but gave it contemporary edge". The new uniforms, which included a women's red shift dress and a men's three piece suit, were unveiled that year with a catwalk show featuring Elle Macpherson and 60 Virgin Australia crew members.

In 2019, Grbac competed in season 7 of Project Runway All Stars, which featured international winners; she was eliminated in episode 5.
