= Project Runway El Djazair =

- Also known as: Project Runway Algeria
- Genre: Reality show
- Based on: Project Runway (US version)
- Presented by: Maroua Bekkouche
- Judges: Karim Akrouf; Rayan Atlas; Meriem Abdellatif
- Country of origin: Algeria
- Original language: Arabic

Production
- Production location: Algiers
- Running time: 90 minutes (including commercials)
- Production company: Echorouk Group

Original release
- Network: Echorouk TV
- Release: October 28, 2023 – December 28, 2024

Project Runway El Djazair (Arabic: بروجكت رانواي الجزائر) is the Algerian version of the successful American reality TV show Project Runway. It premiered on October 28, 2023, on Echorouk TV. The show features 12 Algerian designers who compete to become "the next big Algerian designer". Contestants compete against each other for the best costumes and are limited in time, materials and theme. Your designs will be reviewed and one or more designers will be eliminated each week. In each episode, the selected contestants are gradually eliminated based on the judges' scores until only a few contestants remain. These finalists will prepare a complete fashion collection from which the winner will be selected. Each episode features a celebrity guest judge involved in the decision-making process.

Project Runway El Djazair is hosted by Maroua Bekkouche and judged by Karim Akrouf and Meriem Abdellatif, along with a special guest judge each episode. The mentor of the show is fashion designer Rayan Atlas.

== Format ==
Project Runway El Djazair uses a progressive elimination approach, whittling down an initial pool of 12 or more fashion designers to three or four before the final challenge. Each episode features a celebrity guest announcing a new challenge in which the designer must develop one or more new garments to be displayed at the fashion show. Challenges range from creative diversity to testing the designers' ingenuity while maintaining their personal fashion design aesthetic. Once the challenge is announced, designers are given a budget stipend to select and purchase fabrics and ideas, and then have a limited amount of time to complete their designs. Designers usually work independently, but some challenges require participants to work in teams or as a collective group. Once the deadline arrives, the designer must dress the model and choose hairstyle, makeup, and accessories.

== Season 1 ==
The first season of the television show Project Runway El Djazair began airing on 28 October 2023, features 12 designers who compete to become "the next big Algerian designer". The season concluded on 6 January 2024, with Amine Smati being announced the winner.

=== Designer ===
(Ages and names stated are at time of contest)

Contestants	Age	Hometown	Place finished
Taki Haidoussi	32	Oum El Bouaghi	12th
Nouha Derradji	44	Bou Saâda	11th
Selmalya	42	Jijel	10th
Manal Boufenaz	29	Algiers	9th
Dounas Walid	21	Algiers	8th/7th
Farid "Zinedine" Boukharouba	22	Algiers	8th/7th
Baraa Maachi	27	Batna	6th
Souad Zadi		Algiers	5th
Ward Moussaoui	25	Algiers	4th
Fares Benabdeslam	21	Algiers	Runner-up
Maïssa Tizouiar	29	Algiers	Runner-up
Amine Smati	27	Algiers	Winner

=== Challenge ===
Designer Elimination Chart
Designer	1	2	3	4	5	6	7	8	9	10	Elimination Episodes
Amine	IN	IN	IN	HIGH	WIN	IN	HIGH	LOW	ADV	WINNER	Episode 10 – Finale
Fares	IN	IN	HIGH	WIN	WIN	IN	WIN	IN	ADV	RUNNER UP	Episode 10 – Finale
Maïssa	LOW	WIN	IN	IN	IN	WIN	LOW	HIGH	ADV	RUNNER UP	Episode 10 – Finale
Ward	HIGH	IN	WIN	IN	IN	WIN	HIGH	WIN	OUT		Episode 9 - The Bridal Gown
Souad	IN	IN	IN	IN	IN	IN	IN	OUT			Episode 8 - 20th Century Styles
Baraa	WIN	IN	IN	IN	IN	IN	OUT				Episode 7 - Fantasy
Walid	IN	HIGH	LOW	LOW	WIN	OUT					Episode 6 - In The Red Carpet; Episode 5 - Traditional Dress
Zinedine	IN	IN	IN	IN	IN	OUT					Episode 6 - In The Red Carpet; Episode 5 - Traditional Dress
Manal	IN	LOW	IN	OUT							Episode 4 - Modest Dress
Selmalya	IN	IN	OUT								Episode 3 - No Frippery
Nouha	IN	OUT									Episode 2 - Chungai
Taki	OUT										Episode 1 - The Haik

Results
Green background and WINNER means the designer won Project Runway El Djazair.
Blue background and WIN means the designer won that challenge.
Light blue background and HIGH means the designer had one of the highest scores for that challenge, but did not win.
Teal background and ADV means the designer advanced to Finale.
Orange background and LOW means the designer was in the bottom two, but was not eliminated;
Red background and OUT means the designer lost and was out of the competition.

== Season 2 ==
The second season of the television show Project Runway El Djazair began airing on 26 October 2024, features 12 designers who compete to become "the next big Algerian designer". The season concluded on 28 December 2024, with Sakina Laidi being announced the winner.

=== Designer ===
(Ages and names stated are at time of contest)

Contestants	Age	Hometown	Place finished
Kara Verano	32	Algiers	12th
Chifa Belhadj	29	Algiers	11th
Abdelghani Dahmani	26	Blida	10th
Soumia Meranad	35	Batna	9th
Hanane Saibi	28	Boumerdès	8th
Redha Sarais	46	Bordj Bou Arréridj	7th
Wassim Mihoub	26	Algiers	8th
Khadidja Ch.	27	Algiers	5th
Zahed "Mustafa" Abranis	31	Algiers	4th
Chaima Sahnoun	24	Sétif	Runner-up
Meriem	24	Bordj Bou Arréridj	Runner-up
Sakina Laidi	28	M'Sila	Winner

=== Challenge ===
Designer Elimination Chart
Designer	1	2	3	4	5	6	7	8	9	10	Elimination Episodes
Sakina	HIGH	WIN	WIN	IN	HIGH	HIGH	WIN	HIGH	LOW	WINNER	Episode 10 – Finale
Chaima	IN	IN	IN	IN	WIN	IN	IN	IN	HIGH	RUNNER UP	Episode 10 – Finale
Meriem	IN	IN	IN	WIN	HIGH	IN	HIGH	LOW	WIN	RUNNER UP	Episode 10 – Finale
Mustafa	IN	HIGH	LOW	IN	HIGH	IN	LOW	WIN	OUT		Episode 9 - Jeans Challenge
Khadidja	IN	IN	IN	IN	LOW	WIN	IN	OUT			Episode 8 - Ready-to-Wear Challenge
Wassim	LOW	IN	IN	IN	LOW	LOW	OUT				Episode 7 - Smoking Challenge
Redha	IN	IN	HIGH	LOW	LOW	OUT					Episode 6 - The Modest Nail Challenge
Hanane	IN	IN	IN	WIN	OUT						Episode 5 - Quick Change Dress Challenge
Soumia	WIN	IN	IN	OUT							Episode 4 - Paper Design Challenge
Abdelghani	IN	LOW	OUT								Episode 3 - Men's "Gandoura" Challenge
Chifa	IN	OUT									Episode 2 - The Algerian Caftan Challenge
Kara	OUT										Episode 1 - Desert Outfit Challenge

Results
Green background and WINNER means the designer won Project Runway El Djazair.
Blue background and WIN means the designer won that challenge.
Light blue background and HIGH means the designer had one of the highest scores for that challenge, but did not win.
Orange background and LOW means the designer was in the bottom two, but was not eliminated;
Red background and OUT means the designer lost and was out of the competition.
