= Whitehouse Institute of Design =

Australian art and design school

Coordinates: 33.882824°S 151.216888°E

Whitehouse Institute of Design, Australia
- Type: Private Institute of Higher Education
- Established: 1988
- Affiliations: Accademia Italiana Arte Moda Design in Florence, University for the Creative Arts, Bunka Gakuen University
- Faculty: 60
- Students: 700+
- Location: Sydney, Melbourne and Brisbane, Australia
- Campus: Urban
- Website: http://whitehouse-design.edu.au

The Whitehouse Institute of Design, Australia (commonly known as Whitehouse) is a private Design Institute with campuses in the Melbourne central business district, Redfern (Sydney) and Kangaroo Point (Brisbane). It was established in 1988 by Leanne Whitehouse. The Institute offers a Master of Design (M.Des.), Bachelor of Design (B.Des.) degrees, and as well as various vocational education and training (VET) courses, Including Advanced Diplomas, Diplomas, Certificates and various Whitehouse Workshops. The M.Des. degree was first offered in 2014. The Institute's Melbourne campus has hosted several seasons of Project Runway Australia, and has also been the host to Asia's Next Top Model in 2015.

== Notable alumni ==
The school was attended by Frances Abbott, daughter of former Prime Minister of Australia Tony Abbott. She studied through the assistance of an occasional "chairman's scholarship" (worth approximately $60,000) that was awarded in 2011 by the founder and owner of the Whitehouse Institute, Leanne Whitehouse.

Other notable alumni include:

- Yeojin Bae
- Camilla Freeman-Topper of Camilla and Marc
- Tamara Ralph - founder of Ralph & Russo with partner Michael Russo
