= Project Runway (Arabian game show) =

- Also known as: Project Runway Middle East
- Genre: Reality show
- Created by: Eli Holzman
- Based on: Project Runway (US version)
- Directed by: Marcel Dufour (Content); Imad Abboud (Runway)
- Presented by: Jessica Kahawaty; Valerie Abou Chacra
- Judges: Elie Saab; Afef Jnifen; Yousra
- Theme music composer: Jean-Marie Riachi
- Countries of origin: Middle East and North Africa
- Original language: Arabic
- No. of seasons: 2
- No. of episodes: 24

Production
- Executive producer: Alex Meouchy
- Producer: Mohamad Abdul Hak
- Production locations: Middle East and North Africa
- Running time: 60 minutes (including commercials)
- Production company: MBC Group

Original release
- Network: MBC 1 (2016–); MBC Masr 2 (2016–); LDC (2016–); LBCI 2 (2016–)
- Release: September 4, 2016

Project Runway Middle East, is the Arabian version of the successful American reality TV show Project Runway. The show premiered on September 4, 2016 on MBC Group. The show features 12 Arabian designers who compete to become "the next big Arab designer". The contestants compete with each other to create the best clothes and are restricted in time, materials and theme. Their designs are judged, and one or more designers are eliminated each week. During each season, selected competitors are progressively eliminated based on the judges' scores until only a few contestants remain; these finalists prepare a complete fashion collection, from which a winner is determined. Each episode welcomes a celebrity guest judge that will contribute in the decision making.

Project Runway Middle East is hosted by Valerie Abou Chacra, ex-Miss Lebanon 2015 and the mentor, Reem Faisal is a Saudi fashion designer and entrepreneur.

== Format ==
Project Runway Middle East uses progressive elimination to reduce the initial field of 12 or more fashion designers down to three or four before the final challenge. Each Episode features a celebrity guest who announces a new challenge, which requires the designers to develop one or more pieces of new clothing to be presented at a runway show. The challenges range in creative diversity to test the designers' ingenuity while maintaining their personal fashion design aesthetic. After the Challenge announcement The designers are given a budgeted stipend to select and purchase fabric and notions, and then provided a limited amount of time to finish their designs. Often, the designers work independently, although on some challenges, contestants must work in teams or as a single collective group. Once the deadline is reached, the designers must dress their models and select their hair, make-up, and accessories. Each model walks down the runway, and the garment the contestant made is rated by the panel of judges, including the world renowned Lebanese designer Elie Saab, Tunisian fashion model, actress and television presenter Afef Jnifen and finally Egyptian actress and singer Yousra

== Contestants ==
Season One was filmed in Lebanon at MBC Group. It featured many notable guests such as Nancy Ajram, Haifa Wehbe and many more.

=== Season 1 ===
- Hiba Majdi, from Saudi Arabia ELIMINATED
- Luma Saleh, from Lebanon: ELIMINATED
- Alham, from Morocco ELIMINATED
- Issa Hisso, from Syria ELIMINATED
- Amna Shandoly, from Egypt ELIMINATED
- Fatima Al najdi, from Egypt ELIMINATED
- Maroun Issa, from Lebanon ELIMINATED
- Lucy Fadel, from Jordan ELIMINATED
- Salim Charbel, from Tunisia ELIMINATED
- Saba Tarek, from Iraq ELIMINATED
- Rayan Atlas, from Algeria ELIMINATED
- Taghreed Al Areed, from Bahrain ELIMINATED
- Alaa Najd, from Lebanon The Winner

=== Season 2 ===
Season 2 Started filming back in May 2017, it is scheduled to start airing November 19, 2017 on MBC 1 The Winner of Season 2 is Saher Okal.
