= Project Runway Australia season 2 =

Project Runway Australia
- Season 2
- Starring: Kristy Hinze; Henry Roth; Sarah Gale; Jayson Brunsdon
- No. of episodes: 11

Release
- Original network: Arena
- Original release: 8 July – 16 September 2009

Season chronology
- ← Previous; Season 1 Next → Season 3

Project Runway Australia was picked up for a second season by the Arena channel. The season premiered on 8 July 2009. The season concluded on 15 September 2009, with Anthony Capon being announced the winner of the second season of Project Runway.

The prizes for the winner of the second season of Project Runway Australia included a 2009 Holden Cruze, a $100,000 AUD opportunity to showcase their collection at the Rosemount Australia Fashion Week and having their clothes displayed on a six-page spread in Madison magazine.

== Contestants ==
Name	Age	Place of residence	Place finished
Jason Chetcuti	29	Mackay, Queensland	12th
Claudia Chabo	40	Thirroul, New South Wales	11th
Ryan Whelan	27	Melbourne, Victoria	10th
Amber Renae	27	Melbourne, Victoria	9th
Kellyanne Russell	31	Gladstone, Queensland	8th
Michael Finch	23	Mackay, Queensland	7th
Yopie Stafurik	37	Gold Coast, Queensland	6th
Mark Neighbour	42	Brisbane, Queensland	5th
Ivana Stipicic	29	Sydney, New South Wales	4th (Originally 11th)
Lauren Vieyra	24	Sydney, New South Wales	3rd
William Lazootin	40	Sydney, New South Wales	Runner-up
Anthony Capon	25	Melbourne, Victoria	Winner

Models

- Ruby Hunter-Finale for Anthony Capon
- Silvana Lovin
- Naomi Kisiedu
- Dythea Marais
- Natasha Wilson
- Odna Gerel
- Yasmine Staub
- Georgia Sinclair
- Sarah Lawrence
- Jessica Farrell
- Shirlene Lai
- Iskra Galic
- Annaleise Smith

== Challenges ==
Designer Elimination Progress
Designer	1	2	3	4	5	6 ^{1}	7	8	9	Finale
Anthony	HIGH	IN	HIGH	WIN	HIGH	WIN	HIGH	WIN	HIGH	WINNER
William	HIGH	WIN	IN	HIGH	WIN	HIGH	LOW	LOW	LOW	RUNNER UP
Lauren	LOW	IN	WIN	LOW	LOW	HIGH	HIGH	HIGH	WIN	OUT
Ivana	IN	OUT				IN	WIN	LOW	OUT	
Mark	WIN	HIGH	IN	HIGH	LOW	LOW	LOW	OUT		
Yopie	IN	HIGH	IN	LOW	LOW	LOW	OUT			
Michael	IN	LOW	LOW	LOW	HIGH	OUT				
Kellyanne	IN	LOW	HIGH	LOW	OUT	OUT				
Amber	LOW	IN	IN	OUT		OUT				
Ryan	IN	IN	LOW	OUT		OUT				
Claudia	IN	IN	OUT			OUT				
Jason	OUT					OUT				

The designer won the competition.
The designer won the challenge.
The designer is eliminated.
The designer had a high score for the challenge.
The designer was in the top two, or the first to be announced as a high scoring designer.
The designer had a low score for the challenge.
The designer was in the bottom two.
The designer was brought back into the competition.
The designer returned to competition and was eliminated for a second time.

^Note 1: Ivana was paired with the winning designer, Anthony, and brought back into the competition.

=== Episode Challenges ===
- Episode 1 Challenge: Glamorous Dresses on the Red Carpet
- Episode 2 Challenge: Sexy sleepwear for Peter Alexander's summer collection
- Episode 3 Challenge: Avant Garde garments made from equipment purchased at a hardware store
- Episode 4 Challenge: Three outfits inspired by a zoo animal
- Episode 5 Challenge: A modern cutting edge outfit with at least 3 pieces (menswear)
- Episode 6 Challenge: Outfit and head piece for Spring Carnival
- Episode 7 Challenge: An innovative outfit using the fresh food and packaging in the market
- Episode 8 Challenge: Three ready-to-wear outfits for summer 2010
- Episode 9 Challenge: A show-stopping dress for the latest collection of leading label J'Aton
- Episodes 10 & 11 Challenge: The final three designers created a 12-look collection for a runway show which determined the Season Two Winner

=== Judges ===
- Kristy Hinze
- Jayson Brunsdon
- Sarah Gale

=== Other Cast Members ===
- Henry Roth

== Episode Summary ==
=== Episode One ===
Original Airdate: 8 July 2009

The premiere episode of Project Runway Australia Season 2 kicked off with the twelve designers introducing themselves. After being introduced to Kristy and Henry, the designers were told that their first challenge would involve using fabrics disguised as furnishings and decorations surrounded them to create a red carpet look. The designers had approximately ten hours total to complete their look. They were also introduced to 12 new models. After being introduced, the models then chose which designer they wanted to model for. The guest judge for this episode was Nicola Finetti, an Australian fashion designer.

- Guest Judge: Nicola Finetti
- Winner: Mark Neighbour
- Eliminated: Jason Chetcuti

=== Episode Two ===
Original Airdate: 15 July 2009

This episode's challenge is to create at least two pieces of sexy sleepwear for Pyjama King Peter Alexander's summer collection. The garment needed to be a pyjama or lingerie style, with one piece being able to be used as outdoor daywear. The designers had 15 minutes to sketch their designs, $75 to purchase their fabrics and 8 hours to create their look. The winner of the challenge will have their garment commercially produced and sold in selected Peter Alexander stores.

- Guest Judge: Peter Alexander
- Winner: William Lazootin
- Eliminated: Ivana Stipicic

=== Episode Three ===
Original Airdate: 22 July 2009

The challenge this episode is to create completely wearable outfits from nothing but materials from a hardware shop. The designers had 15 minutes with $85 to purchase their materials and 13 hours to complete their look. Paula Joy acts as guest judge as the contestants showcase their designs on the runway.

- Guest Judge: Paula Joye
- Winner: Lauren Vieyra
- Eliminated: Claudia Chabo

=== Episode Four ===
Original Airdate: 29 July 2009

In this week's challenge, the designers are divided into teams of 3 and each team member must create one outfit (3 outfits per team) inspired by a zoo animal. The designers had 15 minutes with $70 each or $210 for each team to purchase their fabrics and the total of 8 hours to complete their look. The designers Guest judge Arthur Gallan helps Kristy Hinze and the panel decide who will be in and who will be out.

Team	Team Captain	Team Members
Butterfly	Michael	Amber, Lauren
Lion	William	Mark, Anthony
Zebra	Kellyanne	Ryan, Yopie

- Guest Judge: Arthur Gallan
- Winning Team: Team Lions
- Winner: Anthony Capon
- Eliminated: Amber Renae & Ryan Whelan

=== Episode Five ===
Original Airdate: 5 August 2009

The challenge this episode is to create a three-piece outfit that is modern cutting edge for a complete male stranger. The designers were told to search for a random male client from the street to model for their outfits. The designers had 15 minutes with $100 to purchase their fabrics and approximately 12 hours to complete their look.

- Guest Judge: Alex Zabotto-Bentley
- Winner: William Lazootin
- Eliminated: Kellyanne Russell

=== Episode Six ===
Original Airdate: 12 August 2009

The six eliminated designers return to team up with the remaining six designers to create an outfit and head piece for the Spring Carnival. The designers had 10 minutes to sketch their designs, 15 minutes with $100 to purchase their fabrics and a total of 10 hours to complete their look. One designer will be brought back into the competition, and one designer will be out.

Team	Remaining Designer	Eliminated Designer
1	Michael	Ryan
2	Anthony	Ivana
3	William	Claudia
4	Mark	Kellyanne
5	Lauren	Amber
6	Yopie	Jason

- Guest Judge: Leona Edmiston
- Winner: Anthony Capon
- Eliminated: Michael Finch
- Back into The Competition: Ivana Stipicic

=== Episode Seven ===
Original Airdate: 19 August 2009

The latest challenge for the designers is to create an innovative outfit using the fresh food and packaging available to them at Melbourne's Victoria Market.

- Guest Judge: Alex Zabotto-Bentley, Bettina Liano
- Winner: Ivana Stipicic
- Eliminated: Yopie Stafurik

=== Episode Eight ===
Original Airdate: 26 August 2009

This week's challenge is to work with students from the White House Institute of design to create three ready-to-wear outfits for summer 2010, which will be modeled by other students. They were given 20 minutes to search for 3 students to work for them and 2 minutes to find some of the remaining students to model for their outfits. One of each student of the team were forced to go purchase the fabrics instead of the designer. They were given 20 minutes with $180 to purchase the fabrics. There was only a total of 12 hours to complete the look.

- Guest Judge: Aurelio Costarella
- Winner: Anthony Capon
- Eliminated: Mark Neighbour

=== Episode Nine ===
Original Airdate: 2 September 2009

This week's challenge is to design a show-stopping dress that will complete the latest collection by leading Australian evening wear label J'Aton. Each designers were given a massive $500 to purchase their fabrics and a total of 20 hours to complete their overall look. The winner was Lauren Vieyra and her dress was added to the J'aton collection bonus a life internship with J'aton.

- Guest Judge: Jacob Luppino, Anthony Pittorino
- Winner: Lauren Vieyra
- Eliminated: Ivana Stipicic

=== Episode Ten ===
Original Airdate: 9 September 2009

The final three designers leave the Whitehouse and return to their homes with $10,000 each to design and create their own collection and there's one final twist in store that the designers don't see coming!

- There was no elimination on episode 10.

=== Episode Eleven ===
Original Airdate: 16 September 2009

It's the final countdown to the runway, and every second counts as the final three cast and fit models for their shows, and race to complete their garments in time.

- Guest Judge: Simon Lock, Paula Joye
- Winner: Anthony Capon
- Eliminated: Lauren Vieyra, William Lazootin
