= Project Runway Australia season 4 =

Project Runway Australia
- Season 4
- Starring: Megan Gale; Alex Perry; Claudia Navone; Peter Morrissey
- No. of episodes: 11

Release
- Original network: Arena
- Original release: 8 October – 17 December 2012

Season chronology
- ← Previous; Season 3

Project Runway Australia 4 is the fourth installment of the reality competition Project Runway Australia, airing on Arena. The series premiered on 8 October 2012.

== Overview ==
Some changes have been made to the judging panel since the third season. Jarryd Clarke and Kirrily Johnston, judges on the previous season, did not return due to work commitments. They were replaced by fashion designer Peter Morrissey and stylist and fashion director of Harper's Bazaar Australia, Claudia Navone. Megan Gale returns as host and head judge, and Alex Perry returns as mentor to the designers.

== Contestants ==
| Name | Age | Place of residence | Place finished |
|---|---|---|---|
| Natalie Cook | 22 | New South Wales | 12th |
| Natashya Manfield | 22 | Queensland | 11th |
| Mladen Milicich | 43 | Western Australia | 10th |
| Sasha-Rose Hartley | 24 | New South Wales | 9th |
| Alexandra Ovijach | 27 | Queensland | 8th |
| Savva Argyrou | 40 | Queensland | 7th |
| William Kutana | 39 | New South Wales (originally from San Francisco) | 6th |
| Jordan Court | 22 | Victoria | 5th |
| Jamie Ashkar | 22 | New South Wales | Runner-up |
| Leah Da Gloria | 25 | New South Wales | Runner-up |
| Tristan Melle | 31 | Victoria (originally from London) | Runner-up |
| Christina Exie | 22 | Victoria | Winner |

Models

- Leah Jay
- Rachel Riddel
- Ebony Edwards
- Ruby Hunter
- Jae Lin
- Zoe Demkiw
- Holly Caiulo
- Lili Hart
- Rosa Solomon

== Challenges ==
Designer Elimination Progress
| Designer | 1^{1} | 2 | 3 | 4 | 5 | 6 | 7 | 8 | 9 | 10^{2} | 11^{3} |
|---|---|---|---|---|---|---|---|---|---|---|---|
| Christina | IN | IN | IN | WIN | IN | HIGH | LOW | HIGH | OUT | IN | WINNER |
| Leah | HIGH | WIN | HIGH | HIGH | HIGH | LOW | WIN | LOW | HIGH | ADV | RUNNER-UP |
| Tristan | IN | HIGH | WIN | HIGH | HIGH | HIGH | HIGH | HIGH | LOW | ADV | RUNNER-UP |
| Jamie | HIGH | IN | IN | LOW | WIN | LOW | LOW | WIN | WIN | ADV | RUNNER-UP |
| Jordan | IN | LOW | LOW | IN | LOW | HIGH | LOW | OUT | | OUT | |
| William | LOW | IN | IN | IN | IN | WIN | OUT | | | | |
| Savva | WIN | HIGH | LOW | IN | LOW | OUT | | | | | |
| Alexandra | IN | IN | HIGH | LOW | OUT | | | | | | |
| Sasha-Rose | IN | LOW | IN | OUT | | | | | | | |
| Mladen | LOW | IN | OUT | | | | | | | | |
| Natashya | IN | OUT | | | | | | | | | |
| Natalie | LOW | OUT | | | | | | | | | |

The designer won the competition
The designer won the challenge
The designer was eliminated
The designer had a high score for the challenge
The designer came in second but did not win the challenge
The designer had a low score for the challenge
The designer was in the bottom two
The designer withdrew from the competition
The designer was brought back into the competition
The designer advanced to Fashion Week.

^Note 1: William and Natalie, the bottom 2 of challenge one, were given a second chance in the competition. Along with a standard elimination in challenge two, William and Natalie must compete head-to-head, with one of the two additionally being eliminated.
^Note 2: In the 10th episode, Jordan & Christina were bought back to show their collections to Alex, and create one more look. based on his decision, one would rejoin the competition and become the last finalist. Christina re-entered and eventually won.
^Note 3: In the winners announcement, Megan simply named Christina as the Winner. Leah, Jamie and Tristan were all named runners-up, and their specific rankings were not specified.

== Episode summaries ==
=== Episode one ===
Original airdate: 8 October 2012

The first challenge of the season required the designers to create garment of their choosing to showcase who they are as a designer. No one was sent home, however Natalie and William (the bottom two) were required to compete head-to-head in the next challenge, with one of the two going home.

- Guest Judge: Miranda Kerr
- Winner: Savva
- Out: No one

=== Episode two ===
Original airdate: 15 October 2012

The designers were tasked with creating a sleek and sophisticated outfit made from materials purchased at The Reject Shop.

- Guest Judge: Fleur Wood
- Winner: Leah
- Out: Natalie & Natashya

=== Episode three ===
Original airdate: 22 October 2012

The challenge required the designers to create a commercial, white women's shirt and an accompanying outfit. The winning designer's white shirt would be featured in Madison Magazine and sold in Witchery stores in Australia, with proceeds going to ovarian cancer research.

- Guest Judge: Lizzie Renkert
- Winner: Tristan
- Out: Mladen

=== Episode four ===
Original airdate: 29 October 2012

The remaining designers were required to create an on-trend menswear look for a tradesman. As the winner of the previous challenge, Tristan could choose his client first, and pair up the rest of the designers and tradesmen.

- Guest Judge: Joe Farage
- Winner: Christina
- Out: Sasha-Rose

=== Episode five ===
Original airdate: 5 November 2012

Alex awoke the designers and took them to the Melbourne Museum in order to present their challenge; to form teams and create a demi-couture collection inspired by their surroundings. Christina could join the team she wanted for winning the previous challenge, and the entire winning team would be safe.

| Team name | Members |
|---|---|
| Team Savva | Jordan, Tristan, Alexandra, Savva |
| Team Dragonfly | Jamie, Leah, William, Christina |

Alex later tasked the teams with creating a 5th look to open their collections.

- Guest Judge: Toni Maticevski
- Winning Team: Team Dragonfly
- Winner: Jamie
- Out: Alexandra

=== Episode six ===
Original airdate: 12 November 2012

The designers were tasked with creating a show-stopping garment featuring volume and curve using environmental shopping bags of various colours.

- Guest Judge: Glynis Traill-Nash
- Winner: William
- Out: Savva

=== Episode seven ===
Original airdate: 19 November 2012

The remaining designers were paired up with teenage girls and tasked with creating a dress for them to wear to their school formal. For winning the last challenge, William got to allocate each designer their budget.

| Designer | Budget |
|---|---|
| Leah | $100 |
| Jamie | $100 |
| Tristan | $150 |
| Jordan | $150 |
| Christina | $200 |
| William | $300 |

- Guest Judges: Genevieve & Alexandra Smart
- Winner: Leah
- Out: William

=== Episode eight ===
Original airdate: 26 November 2012

The challenge for this week had the designers creating a dress for singer and television personality Natalie Bassingthwaighte to wear to a music awards show. Later, Alex tasked the designers to create an additional dress for Natalie to wear to an after party. Designers could only choose 2 fabrics, could not share or use the same fabrics as others, and had two extra hours to finish both looks.

- Guest Judges: Natalie Bassingthwaighte & Nicole Bonython-Hines
- Winner: Jamie
- Out: Jordan

=== Episode nine ===
Original airdate: 3 December 2012

- Winner: Jamie
- Out: Christina

In this challenge, contestants had to design an outfit that would later have a photo shoot. Christina got eliminated after her black ruffled dress looked far too tortured for the runway.

=== Episode ten ===
Original airdate: 10 December 2012

The three remaining designers return to the Whitehouse workroom to prepare for the finale showing of their collections. As a surprise the two most recently cut designers, Jordan and Christina, are brought back, having also completed ten look collections. The twist is they create one more look to convince their mentor (Alex) to pick just one to return and show with the three other finalists.

- Winner: No one
- Returned to competition: Christina
- Out: Jordan

=== Episode eleven ===
Original airdate: 17 December 2012 The final four prepare for the finale runway show. After the runway the judges critique the designer’s collections back at studio.

- Winner: Christina
- Out: Jamie, Leah, and Tristan
