= Elie Saab net dress of Halle Berry =

Dress worn at the 74th Academy Awards on March 24, 2002

- Designer: Elie Saab
- Year: 2002
- Type: Net and embroidery topped burgundy dress

The American actress Halle Berry wore a mesh and embroidery-topped deep-red dress to the 74th Academy Awards on March 24, 2002, at which she won an Academy Award for her performance in Monster's Ball. It was designed by Lebanese designer Elie Saab.

In a poll by Debenhams published in The Daily Telegraph the dress was voted the eighth greatest red carpet gown of all time. Cosmopolitan cited the dress as one of the Best Oscar dresses of all time, saying, "Probably one of the best-known Oscar dresses of all time, it shows off Halle's best parts, while the strategic embroidering still leaves something to the imagination. There's a lot of material on the bottom half, but it doesn't swallow her up or hide the shape of her legs." Variety's Complete Book of Oscar Fashion placed it among their selections for the Oscar's most beautiful gowns, noting that she had "fashion critics raving for days" with the dress forming a "dramatic counterpoint to Berry's fresh, good looks." The dress is now on display in the Academy Museum.

== See also ==
- List of individual dresses
