= Elie Saab =

Lebanese fashion designer (born 1964)

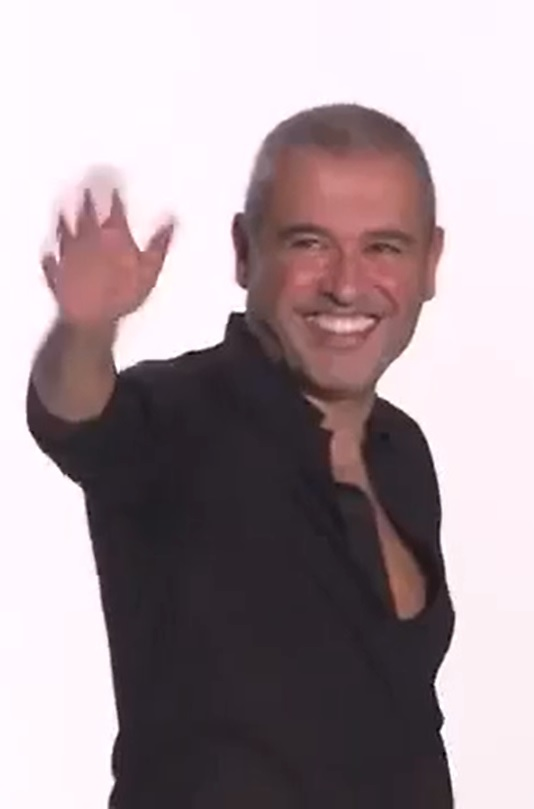
- Saab at his Spring 2012 Fashion Show
- Born: 4 July 1964 (age 62); Beirut, Lebanon
- Occupation: Fashion designer
- Label: Elie Saab (1998–present)
- Spouse: Claudine Saab

Elie Saab (Arabic: ايلي صعب) (born 4 July 1964) is a fashion designer based in Lebanon. He started his business in the early 1980s, and specialized in bridal couture. His work includes the use of materials such as lace, gemstones, crystals, pearls, and embroidery.

As of 2017, his couture collections were sold in Paris, London, and Beirut, and his ready-to-wear line was distributed through 160 retailers and his own boutiques.

He is the first Lebanese designer to become a member of the Chambre Syndicale de la Haute Couture. In 2016, he served as a judge on Project Runway: Middle East.

== Early life ==
Elie Saab was born in Beirut, Lebanon, as the eldest of five children in a Maronite Catholic family. His father was a wood merchant in Damour, a coastal suburb south of Beirut.

Saab developed an interest in sewing at a young age and began experimenting with fashion around the age of eight, using materials found at home and involving his sisters as models.

== Career ==
The logo of Elie Saab's fashion house.

=== Early years ===
In 1981, Saab moved to Paris to study fashion, but later returned to Beirut. In 1982, at age 18, he started working with a team of 15 employees, initially specializing in bridal couture. His work featured detailed embroidery, pearls, crystals, and silk fabrics. His reputation grew locally and gradually attracted a wider clientele, including high society figures.

In 1997, Saab was the first non-Italian designer to become a member of the National Chamber of Italian Fashion, and in 1997 he showed his first collection outside Lebanon in Rome.

In 1998, he started his ready-to-wear line in Milan, as well as an accessories line. During the same year, Saab held a fashion show in Monaco, with Princess Stéphanie of Monaco in attendance.

In 1999, one of his dresses thickly embroidered with emeralds and diamonds was reportedly sold for $2.4 million.

=== International recognition ===
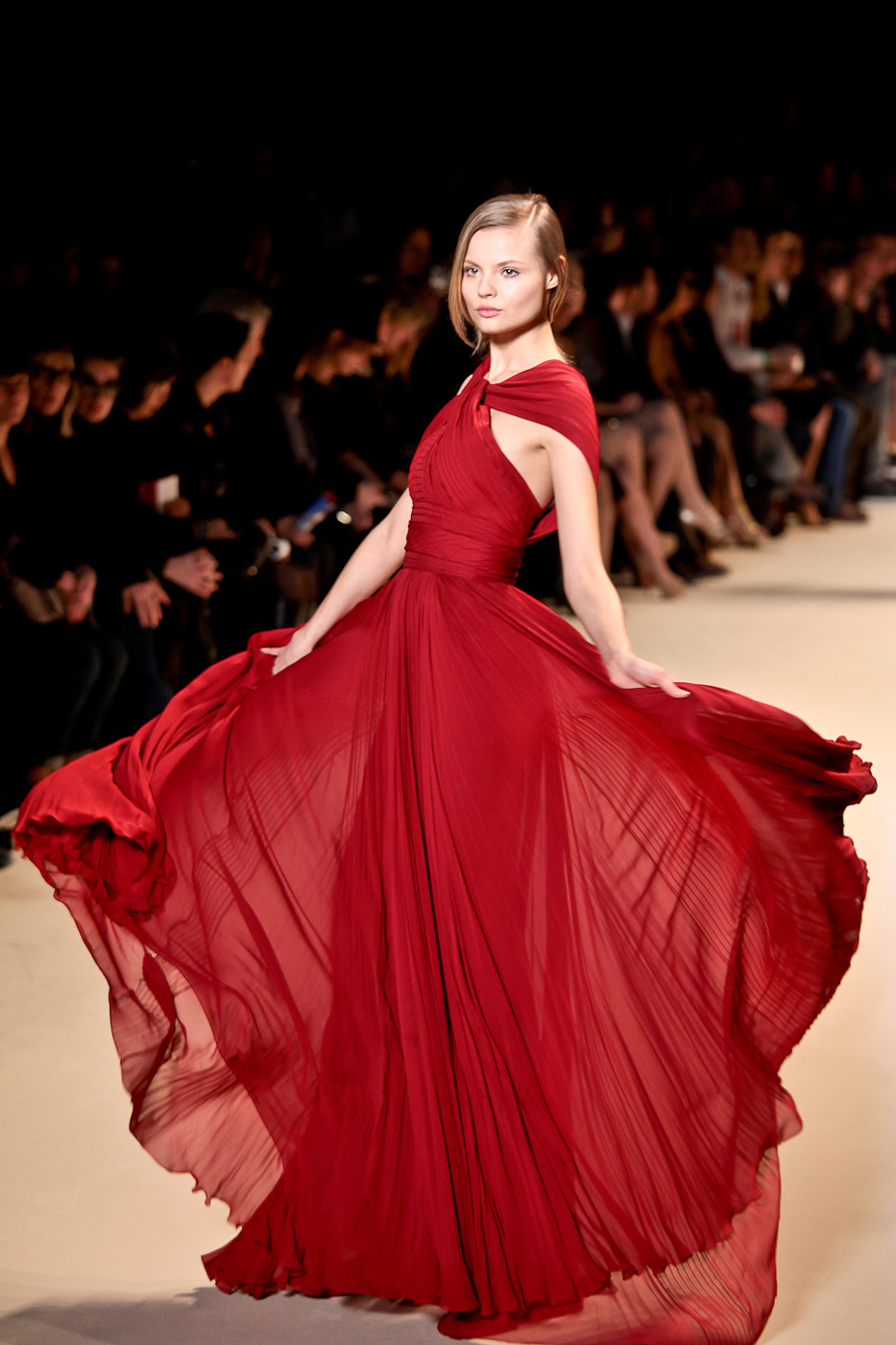
Magdalena Frackowiak in Elie Saab at Paris Fashion Week Fall Winter 2011

Saab became more well known in the United States after he became the first Lebanese designer to dress an Oscar winner, Halle Berry, in 2002. In May 2003, the Chambre Syndicale de la Haute Couture invited him to become a member, and he showed his first haute couture collection in Paris in July 2003.

In 2003, he teamed up with Pronovias to create a bridal line, Elie by Elie Saab.

The Chambre Syndicale de la Haute Couture inducted him as a membre correspondant in 2006. His first ready-to-wear collection in Paris was the Spring-Summer 2006 collection.

Saab, Tina Knowles, House of Deréon, Giorgio Armani, Versace, and Herve Leger served as the designers for the outfits of the 2007 The Beyoncé Experience tour. In 2010, Saab dressed 102 celebrities for events overall, up from 40 in 2009. That year, he signed a 10-year licensing agreement with Beauté Prestige International for fragrance and cosmetics. The figure for 2011, up until March, was 88. In 2011, Madame Tussauds unveiled a wax statue of Kate Winslet draped in the Elie Saab dress she wore at 63rd Primetime Emmy Awards. In 2011, Elie Saab launched his first fragrance Le Parfum, created by Francis Kurkdjian.

The Duchess of Cambridge wore an Elie Saab gown while attending Royal Ascot in 2019. This was the first time one of Saab's gowns was worn by a British royal.

=== Recent projects and collaborations ===
In 2012, he worked with the Lebanese American University and London College of Fashion to launch a bachelor's degree in fashion design. As of 2013, the brand had boutiques located in Beirut, Dubai, Doha, Paris, London, Geneva, Hong Kong, Moscow, New York City, and Mexico, with 100 retail outlets total. Saab's son, Elie Saab Jr, became brand director in 2013.

Saab appeared as a judge on Project Runway: Middle East in 2016. Between 2015 and 2017, the Elie Saab company opened a second Paris boutique and a new location in London's Mayfair, and in Manhattan. The Manhattan store that opened in October 2016 was his first in the country. As of March 2017, his couture collections are available in Paris, London, and Beirut, while his ready-to-wear clothes were in 160 retailers and his own boutiques. Also that month, the Elie Saab company opened a new Madison Avenue store.

He has designed interiors for luxury residential projects including beachfront property in Dubai,, as well as projects in the Maldives and the Caucasus region.

=== Beirut explosion, 4 August 2020 ===
Saab's main office and headquarters were left badly damaged by the 2020 Beirut explosion, and his home nearby was completely destroyed. Despite this, the designer and his team planned to get back to work in order to finish the collection for the September show.

In April 2021, Elie Saab launched an initiative that consists in donating a portion of sales to UNICEF's "Integrated Education and Well-Being for Vulnerable Girls in Lebanon Program."

=== The 1001 Seasons of Elie Saab, November 2024 ===
In November 2024, Elie Saab celebrated the 45th anniversary of his fashion house with an event titled "The 1001 Seasons of Elie Saab" in Riyadh, Saudi Arabia.

== Notable clients and projects ==
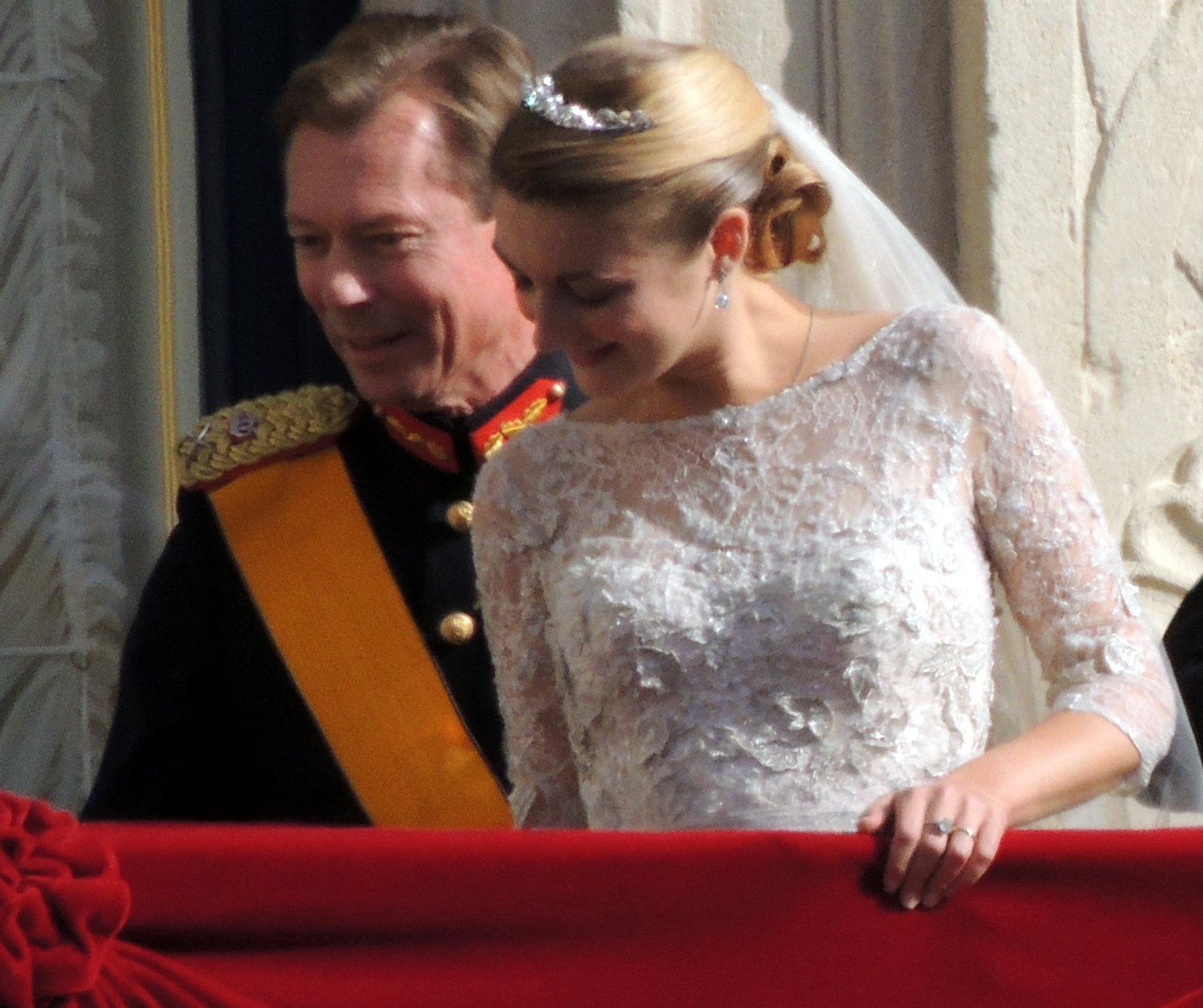
Stéphanie, Hereditary Grand Duchess of Luxembourg, wearing an Elie Saab bridal gown in 2012.

He has been worn by Queen Rania of Jordan, Victoria, Crown Princess of Sweden, Princess Madeleine of Sweden, Princess Maria-Olympia of Greece and Stéphanie, Hereditary Grand Duchess of Luxembourg. In 1999, Queen Rania of Jordan wore Elie Saab for her enthronement. Countess Stéphanie and the Hereditary Grand Duke married in a civil ceremony married in 2012, where the bride wore a dress designed by Elie Saab. Princess Claire of Luxembourg also wore a Saab-designed dress on her wedding. First Lady of France Brigitte Macron wore an Elie Saab outfit of military coat and skinny trousers during a state visit to China.

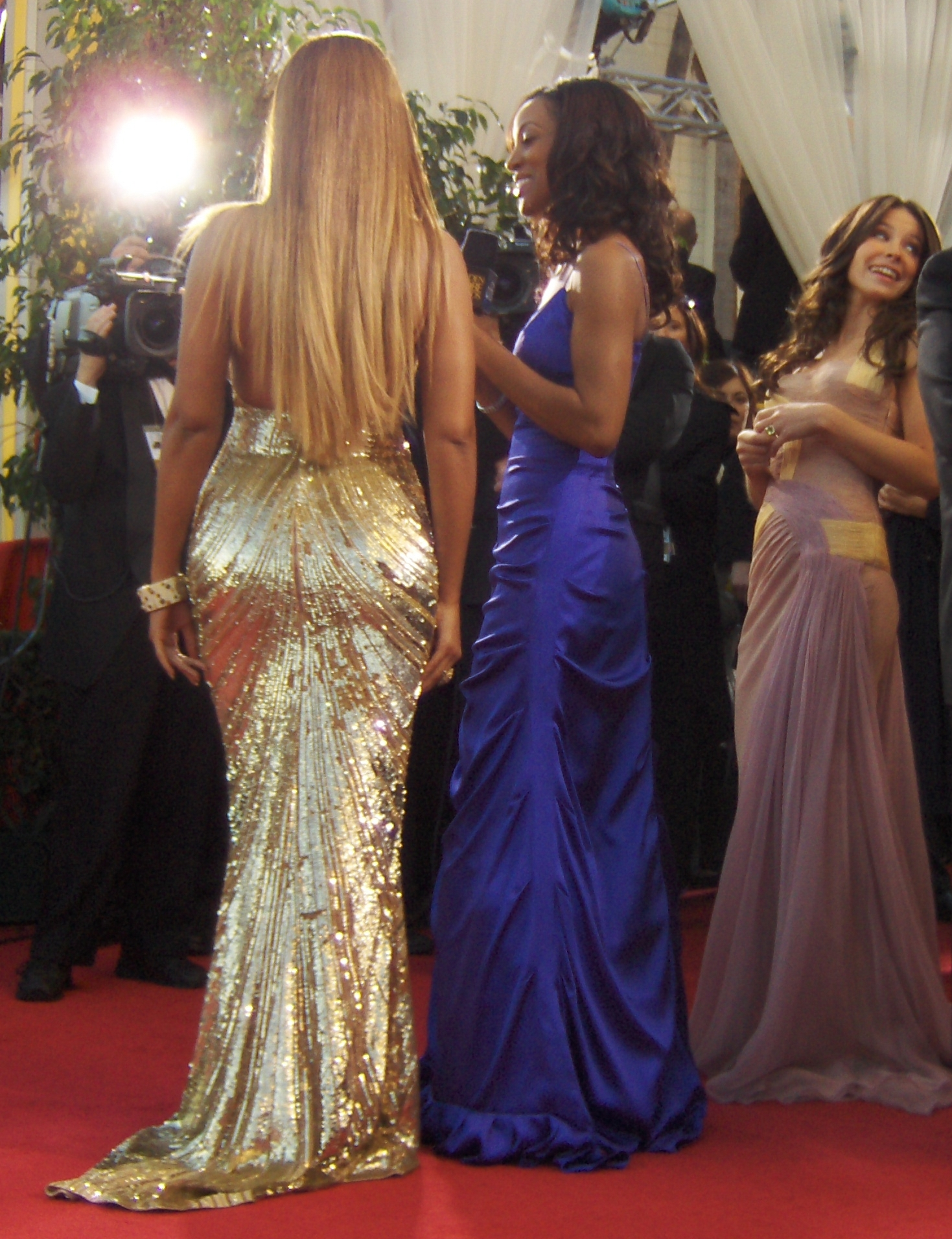
Many attendees at the 64th Golden Globe Awards in 2007 chose beaded or metallic dresses, such as Beyoncé's sequinned gold Elie Saab gown.

Halle Berry wore a burgundy gown by Saab to the 2002 Academy Awards when she won for Best Actress. In a poll by Debenhams published in The Daily Telegraph the dress was voted the 8th greatest red carpet gown of all time. Cosmopolitan magazine cited the dress as "one of the Best Oscar dresses of all time". Berry later wore another dress by Saab to the 2003 Oscars.

Sandra Bullock wore Elie Saab at the 85th Academy Awards in 2013 and at the world premiere of the movie Ocean's 8 in New York.

In 2018, Rose Leslie wore a floral embroidered Elie Saab wedding dress when she wed her Game of Thrones co-star Kit Harington. Catherine, Duchess of Cambridge, wore a gown designed by him to the Royal Ascot in 2019, marking the first occasion where Saab has dressed a member of the British royal family.

Jennifer Lopez has worn Elie Saab on many occasions, including the 87th Academy Awards, 45th Los Angeles Film Critics Association Awards, Global Citizen's Vax Live: The Concert to Reunite the World, and Elie Saab's Paris Haute Couture Show.

Other notable clients of Saab's work have included Nicole Kidman, Eva Green, Beyoncé, Aishwarya Rai, Anna Kendrick, Melania Trump, Christina Aguilera, Catherine Zeta-Jones, Angelina Jolie, Celine Dion, Elena Anaya, Elsa Zylberstein, Heidi Klum, Karlie Kloss, Dame Helen Mirren, Emilia Clarke, Priyanka Chopra, Sonam Kapoor, Kendall Jenner, Taylor Swift, Tiffany Trump and Ons Jabeur.

== Personal life ==
Saab lives in Lebanon with his wife Claudine and their three sons.

== Controversies ==
In January 2018, Saab's label faced criticism after posting a photo of Israeli actress Gal Gadot wearing one of his dresses with a caption that was later deleted.

== Filmography ==
- 2016: Project Runway: Middle East - judge

== See also ==
- List of Maronites
