= Kristy Hinze =

Australian model

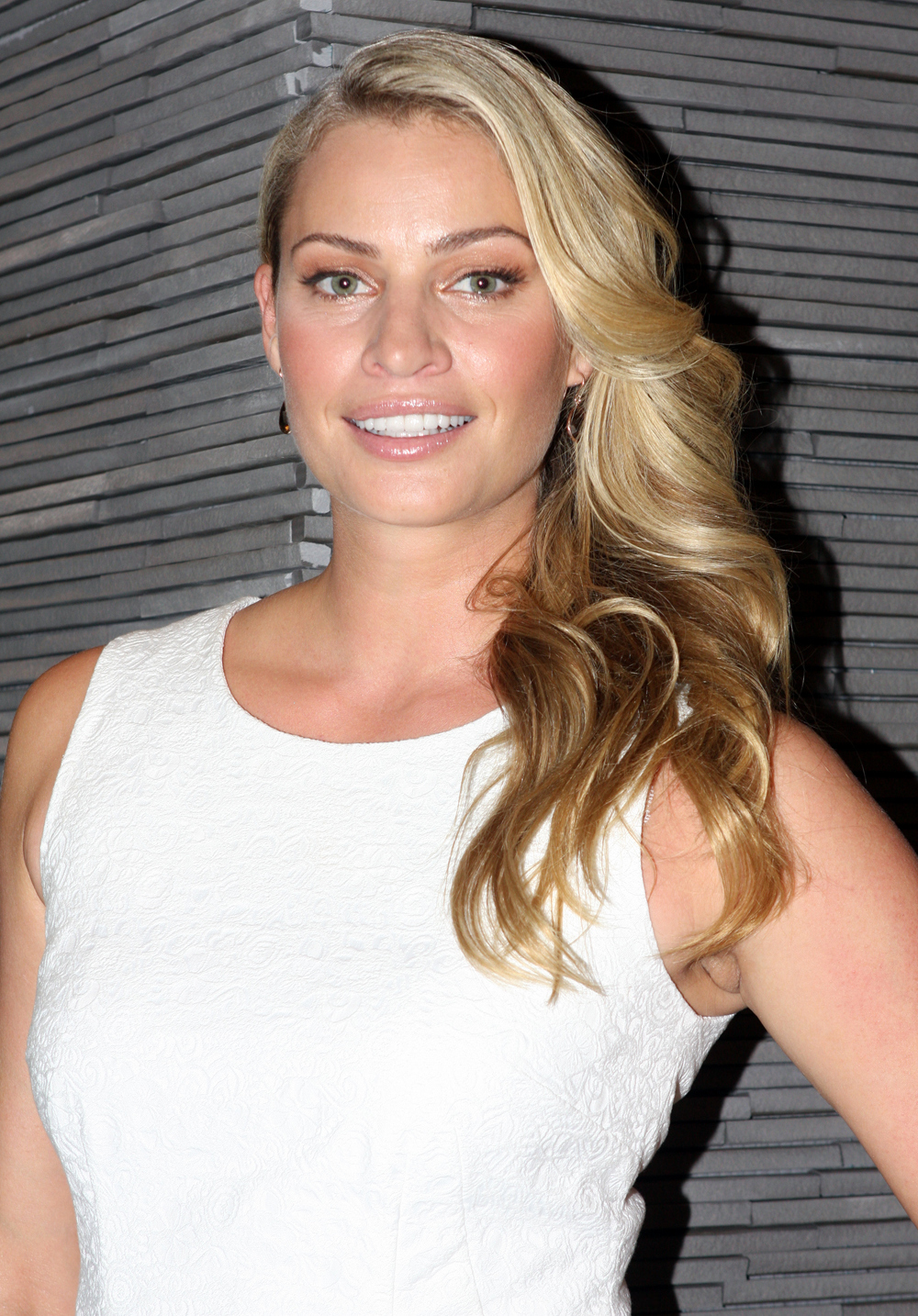
- Hinze in October 2012
- Born: 16 October 1979 (age 47); Gold Coast, Queensland, Australia
- Occupations: Model, actress, television host
- Spouse: James H. Clark (m. 2009)
- Children: 2
- Modeling information
- Height: 1.77 m (5 ft 10 in)
- Agency: Elite Model Management, New York and Los Angeles

Kristy Hinze (born 16 October 1979) is an Australian model, actress and television host. Hinze has appeared in Sports Illustrated as well as the Victoria's Secret catalogue.

== Early life and education ==
Kristy Hinze was born on the Gold Coast. She is the granddaughter of Queensland politician Russ Hinze. In 1994, when she was 14 years old, Hinze appeared in the Australian edition of Vogue. She attended Beaudesert State High School.

== Career ==
Hinze appeared on the tenth season of America's Next Top Model and was working at that time with Elite model management New York.

Hinze was the host and head judge of Project Runway Australia during the first and second season, it was announced Megan Gale would be the host of the third season. She appeared on the first ever cover of the short lived Australian Edition of Ocean Drive magazine. Hinze portrayed Marc Anthony's love interest in the music video for his single "You Sang to Me", both the Spanish and English versions.

It was announced in February 2008 that she will be the host of the Australian version of US reality TV show, Project Runway.

== Personal life ==
In October 2008, Hinze became engaged to billionaire James H. Clark, founder of Silicon Graphics and Netscape and 35 years her senior. They married on 22 March 2009. She gave birth to their first child, a daughter named Dylan Vivienne, in September 2011 in New York City. Their second daughter Harper was born on 19 August 2014.

Hinze reportedly bought a home in Australia online while taking a break from filming Adam Rifkin's Without Charlie in Los Angeles.

=== Yacht racing ===
In December 2015, Hinze became the first female boat owner to win the Sydney to Hobart Yacht Race.
