= List of Australia's Next Top Model contestants =

This is a list of contestants who have appeared on the Australian television show Australia's Next Top Model. The show is hosted by model Jennifer Hawkins and her panel of judges, and contestants compete to win a modeling contract with a top modeling agency and along with other prizes. The series first aired in 2005 and as of 2016, ten seasons have aired. A total of 135 different participants have been selected as finalists in the show in its ten years running, with ten contestants (Gemma Sanderson, Eboni Stocks, Alice Burdeu, Demelza Reveley, Tahnee Atkinson, Amanda Ware, Montana Cox, Melissa Juratowitch, Brittany Beattie and Aleyna FitzGerald) crowned Australia's Next Top Model.

== Contestants ==
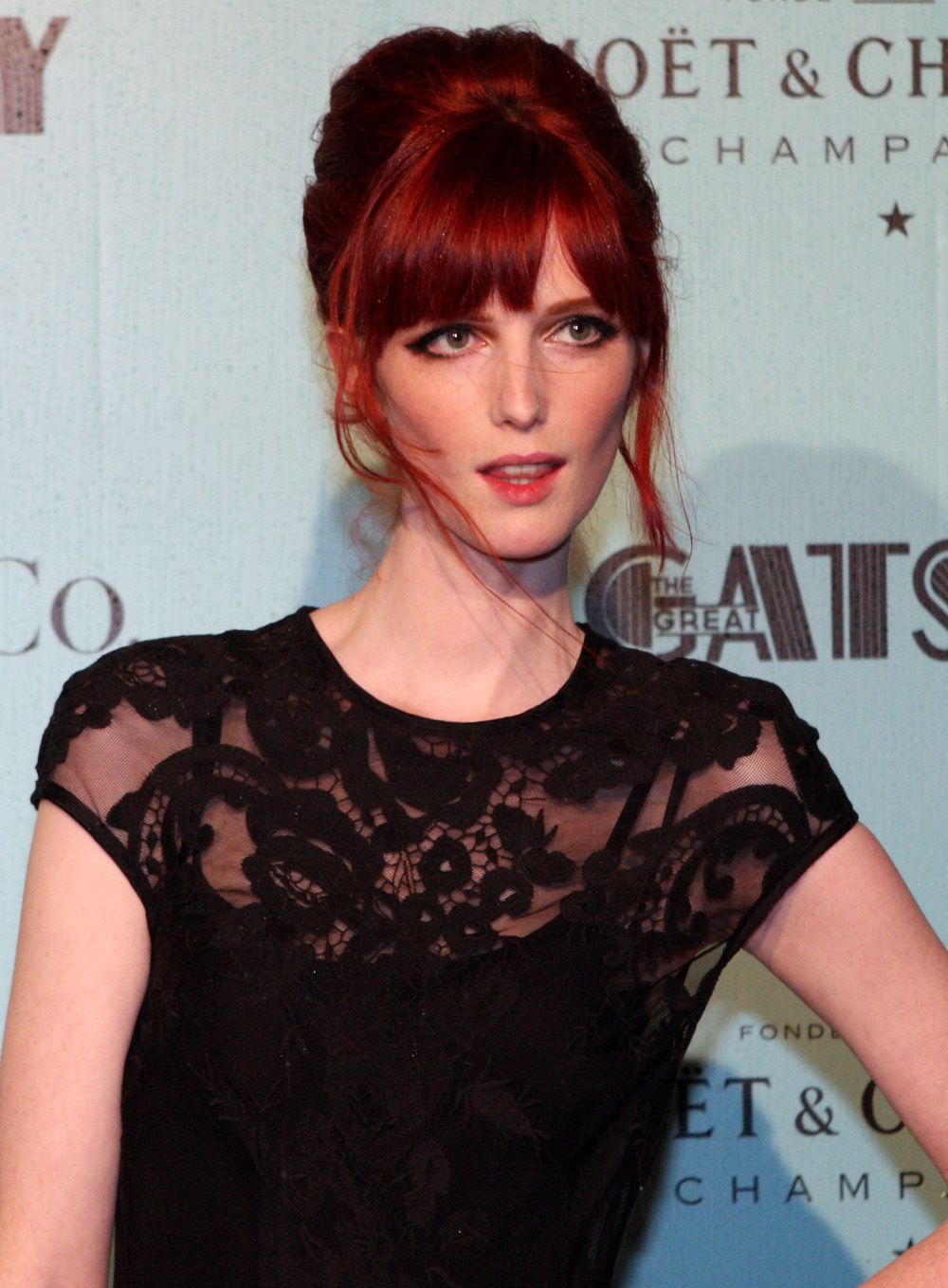
Alice Burdeu, season 3 winner

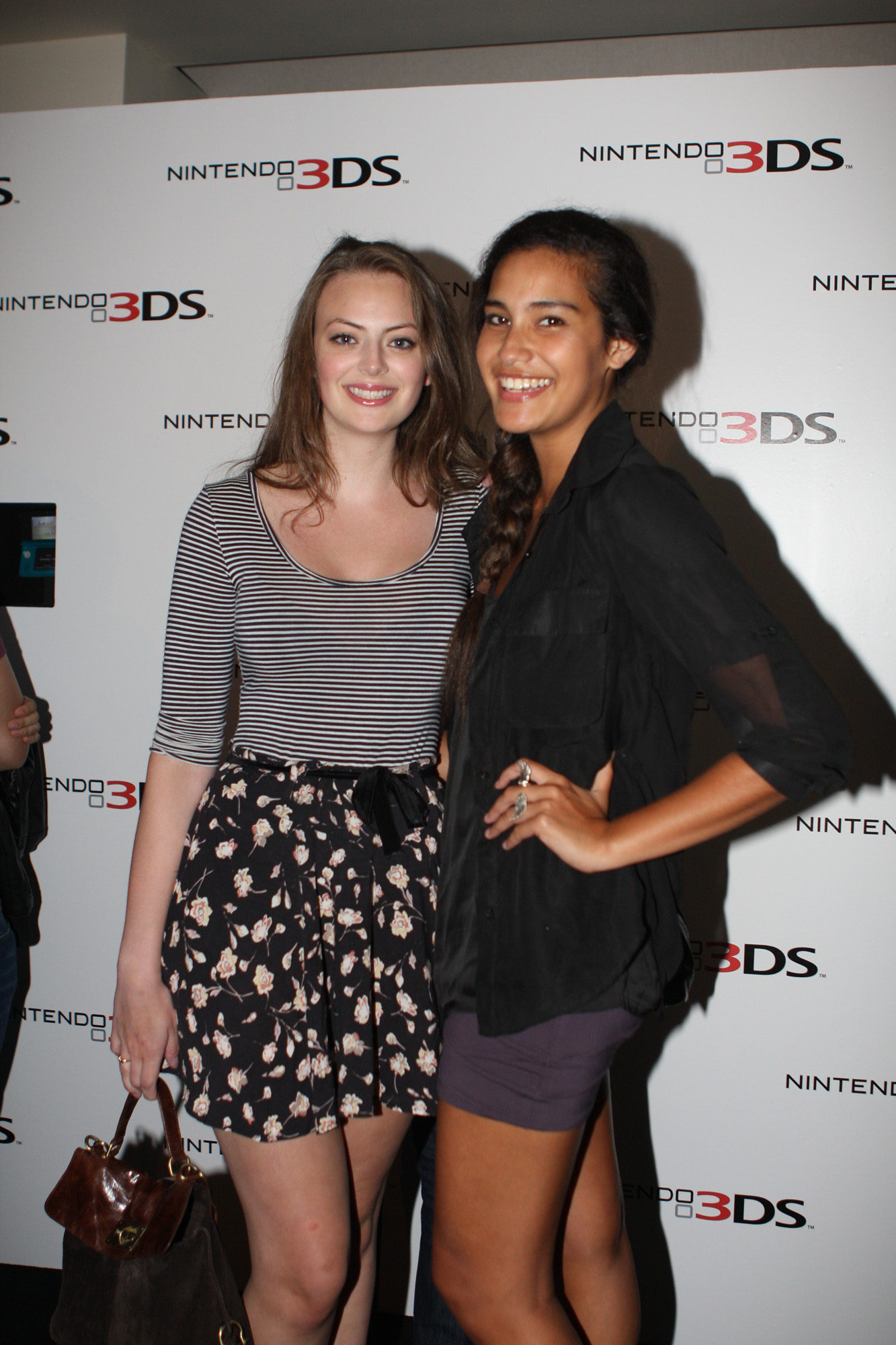
Season 4 finalists, Demelza Reveley and Rebecca Jobson

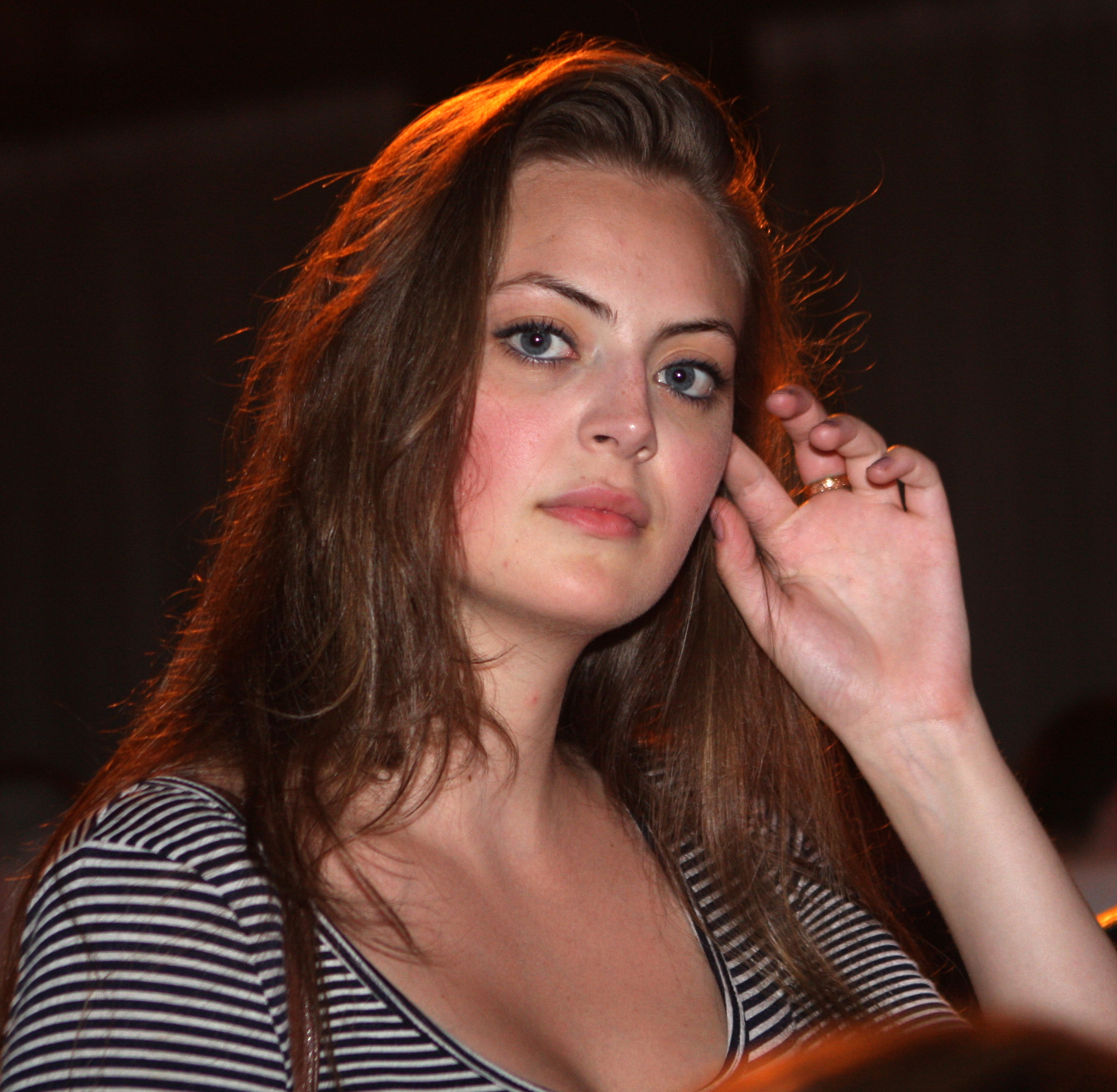
Demelza Reveley, season 4 winner

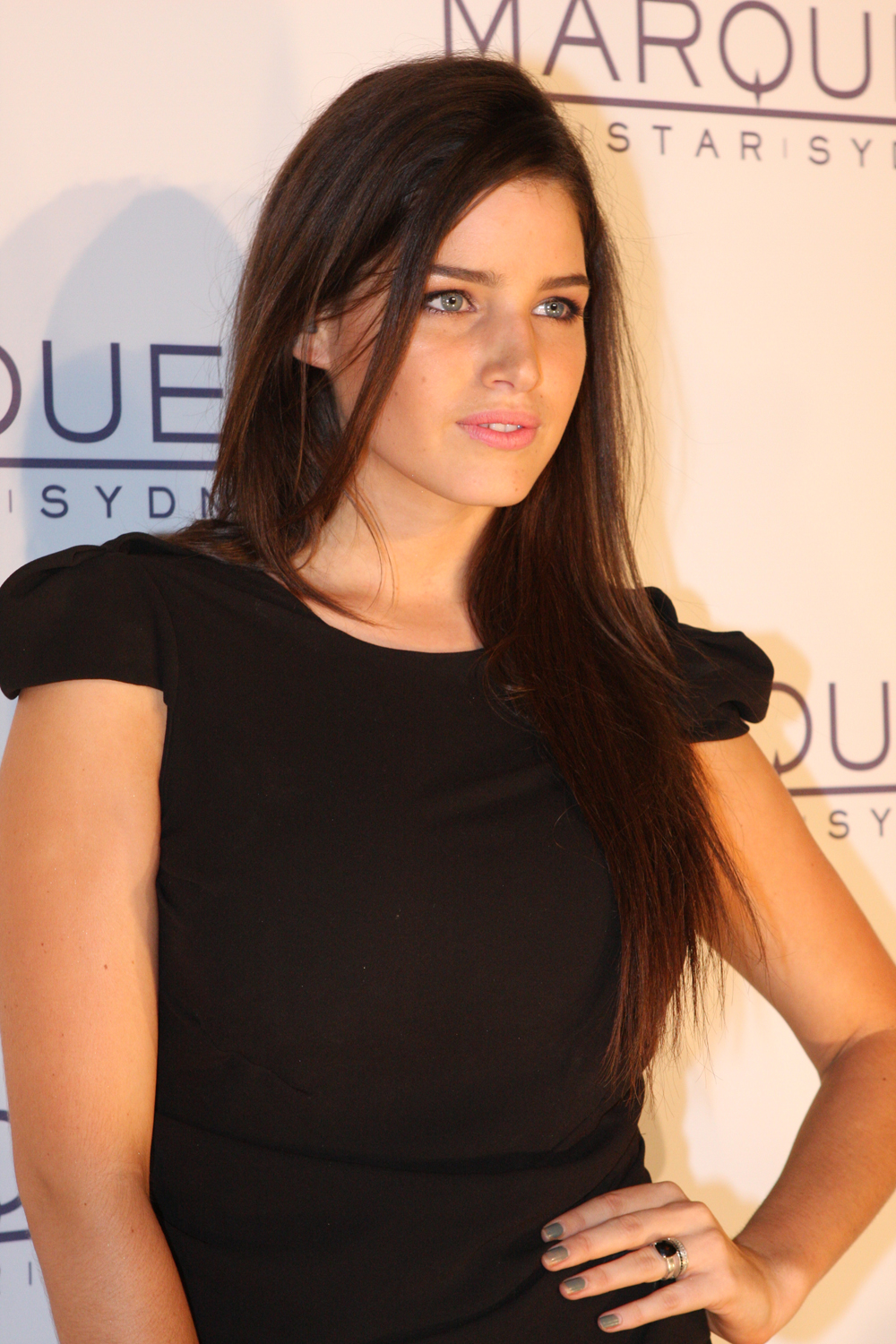
Tahnee Atkinson, season 5 winner

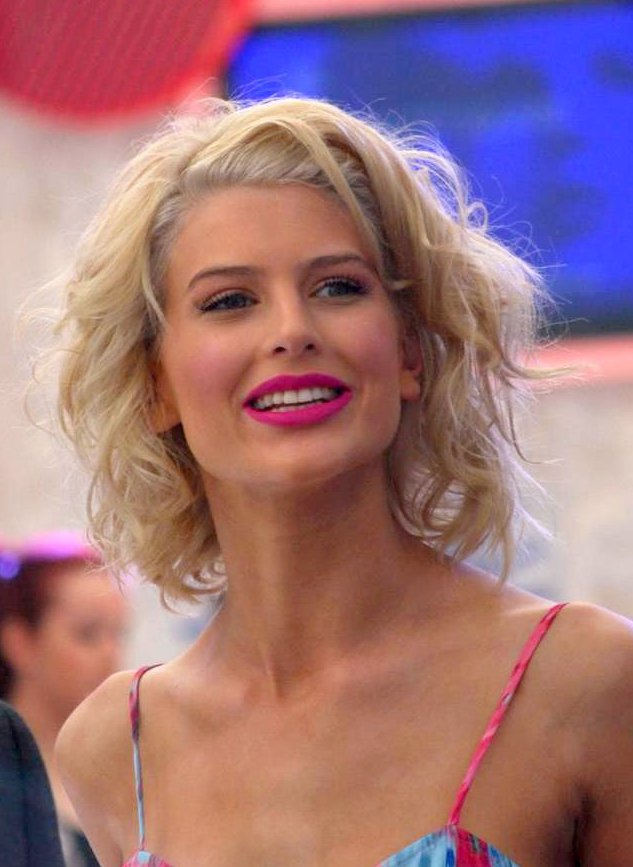
Sophie Van Den Akker, season 6 finalist

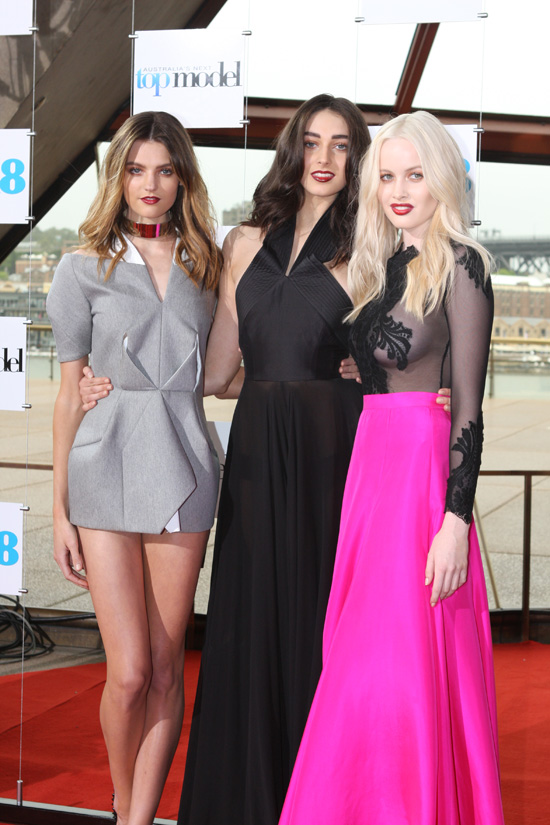
Season 7 finalists, Montana Cox, Liz Braithwaite, and Simone Holtznagel at the series final red carpet

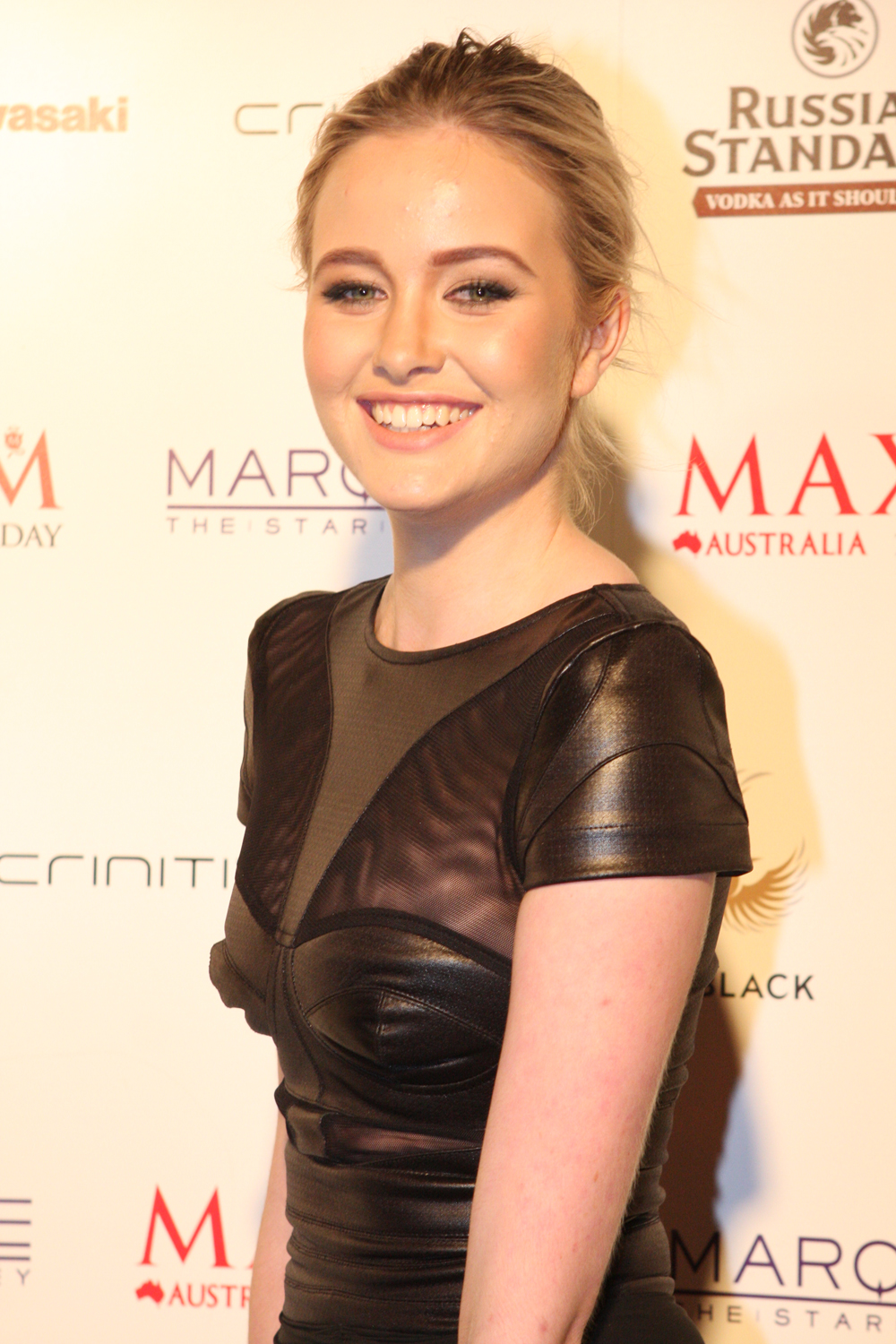
Simone Holtznagel, season 7 finalist

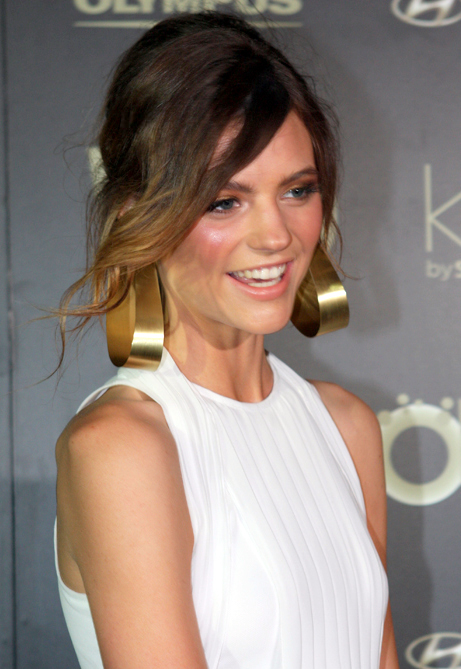
Montana Cox, season 7 winner

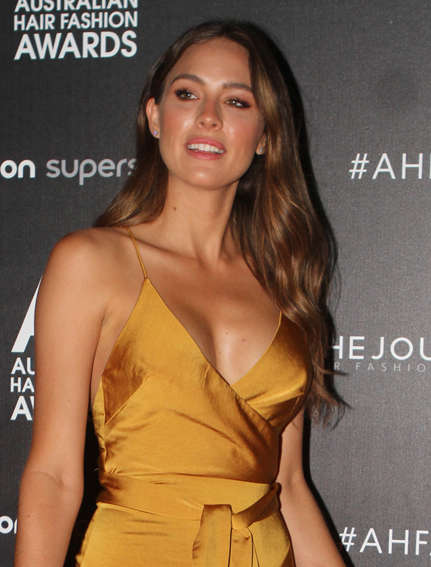
Madeline Cowe, season 8 contestant

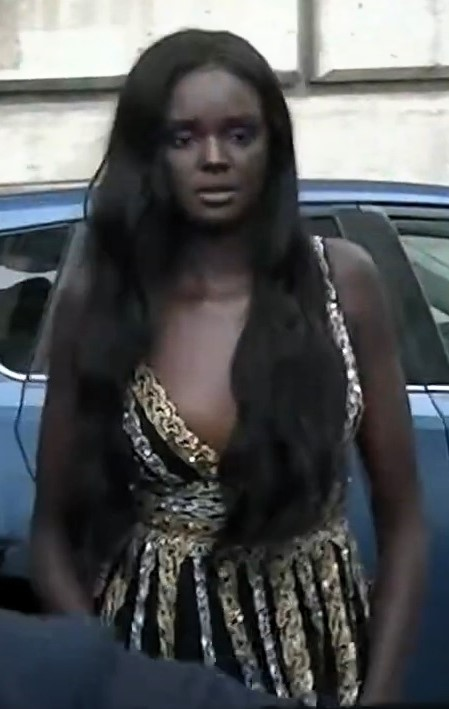
Duckie Thot, season 8 finalist

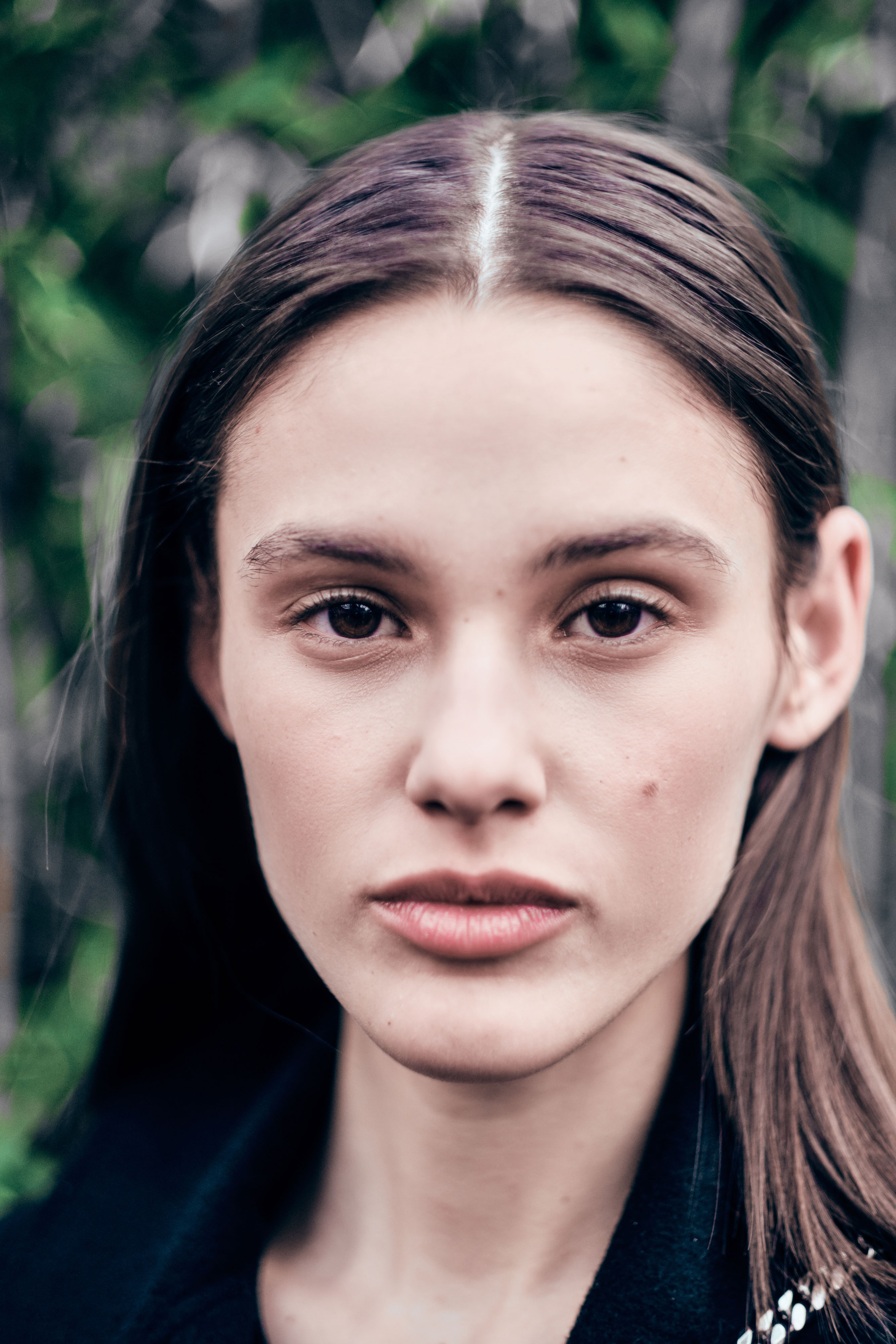
Aleyna_FitzGerald, season 10 winner

Contestant	Age (Note: The ages stated for each contestant correspond with their ages at the time of the season's filming.)	Hometown	Place	Season
Naomi Thompson	22	Townsville	10th	Season 1
Nicole Fraser	19	Albury	9th	Season 1
Atong Tulba Mulual	19	Sydney	8th	Season 1
Allana Ridge	19	Sydney	7th (quit)	Season 1
Zoe McDonald	19	Gold Coast	6th	Season 1
Simmone Duckmanton	18	Melbourne	5th	Season 1
Sam Morley	20	Gold Coast	4th	Season 1
Shannon McGuire	19	Perth	3rd	Season 1
Chloe Wilson	19	Adelaide	Runner-up	Season 1
Gemma Sanderson	22	Newcastle	Winner	Season 1
Sasha Greenoff	22	Darwin	13th	Season 2
Rebecca Pian	18	Melbourne	12th/11th	Season 2
Natalie Giuffre	19	Perth	12th/11th	Season 2
Sophie Miller	18	Brisbane	10th	Season 2
Sarah Lawrence	19	Perth	9th	Season 2
Hiranthi Warusevitane	21	Canberra	8th	Season 2
Caroline Mouflard	18	Byron Bay	7th (quit)	Season 2
Lara Cameron	18	Perth	6th	Season 2
Louise Van Brussel	20	Adelaide	5th	Season 2
Madeleine Rose	18	Sydney	4th	Season 2
Simone Viljoen	19	Canberra	3rd	Season 2
Jessica French	20	Brisbane	Runner-up	Season 2
Eboni Stocks	19	Hobart	Winner	Season 2
Jaimi Smith	18	Adelaide	13th (quit)	Season 3
Cobi Marsh	17	Melbourne	12th	Season 3
Cassandra Hughes	18	Emu Plains	11th	Season 3
Kara Taylor	19	South Coast	10th	Season 3
Steph Flockhart	17	Brisbane	9th	Season 3
Jane Williamson	19	Adelaide	8th	Season 3
Sophie Wittingslow	19	Rye	7th	Season 3
Danica Brown	16	Gold Coast	6th	Season 3
Paloma Rodriguez	16	Newcastle	5th	Season 3
Anika Salerno	20	Beaudesert	4th	Season 3
Jordan Loukas	17	Sydney	3rd	Season 3
Steph Hart	16	Central Coast	Runner-up	Season 3
Alice Burdeu	18	Melbourne	Winner	Season 3
Kamila Markowska	17	Adelaide	13th	Season 4
Kristy Coulcher	19	Sydney	12th	Season 4
Emma O'Sullivan	17	Pottsville	11th	Season 4
Belinda Hodge	17	Ballan	10th	Season 4
Alamela Rowan	17	Byron Bay	9th	Season 4
Leiden Kromberger	18	Sydney	8th/7th	Season 4
Jamie Lee	21	Adelaide	8th/7th	Season 4
Rebecca Jobson	18	Wollongong	6th	Season 4
Alyce Crawford	17	Kiama	5th	Season 4
Caris Eves	19	Inglewood	4th	Season 4
Samantha Downie	20	Rowville	3rd	Season 4
Alexandra Girdwood	19	Sydney	Runner-up	Season 4
Demelza Reveley	16	Wollongong	Winner	Season 4
Laura Tyrie	18	Willetton	13th	Season 5
Leah Johnsen	18	Oakleigh	12th	Season 5
Georgie Kidman	16	Castlemaine	11th	Season 5
Mikarla Hussey	18	Albion Park	10th/9th	Season 5
Eloise Hoile	20	Glenunga	10th/9th	Season 5
Madison Wall	17	Wurtulla	8th	Season 5
Laura Mitchell	20	Ocean Reef	7th	Season 5
Lola Van Vorst	20	Newport	6th	Season 5
Franky Okpara	18	Wanneroo	5th	Season 5
Adele Thiel	18	Hornsby	4th	Season 5
Clare Venema	16	Bridgewater	3rd	Season 5
Cassi Van Den Dungen	16	Sunbury	Runner-up	Season 5
Tahnee Atkinson	16	North Fremantle	Winner	Season 5
Valeria Nilova	17	Rostrevor	16th-12th	Season 6
Sally Geach	19	Bull Creek	16th-12th	Season 6
Claire Smith	18	Sorrento	16th-12th	Season 6
Ashlea Monigatti	16	Echuca	16th-12th	Season 6
Alison Boxer	16	Yarraville	16th-12th	Season 6
Megan Jacob	17	Park Orchards	11th	Season 6
Ashton Flutey	18	Collaroy	10th	Season 6
Chantal Croccolo	20	Bankstown	9th	Season 6
Kimberly Thrupp	20	Burleigh Waters	8th	Season 6
Brittney Dudley	16	Clare	7th	Season 6
Joanna Broomfield	18	North Adelaide	6th	Season 6
Kathryn Lyons	20	Jamboree Heights	5th	Season 6
Jessica Moloney	19	Harvey	4th	Season 6
Sophie Van Den Akker	19	Croydon	3rd	Season 6
Kelsey Martinovich	19	Lennox Head	Runner-up	Season 6
Amanda Ware	17	Mermaid Beach	Winner	Season 6
Cassy Phillips-Sainsbury	17	Bonnyrigg	16th	Season 7
Tayah Lee-Traub	18	Perth	15th	Season 7
Annaliese McCann	16	Shepparton	14th/13th	Season 7
Alissandra Moone	18	Perth	14th/13th	Season 7
Neo Yakuac	18	Brisbane	12th/11th	Season 7
Caroline Austin	19	Brisbane	12th/11th	Season 7
Yolanda Hodgson	22	Sydney	10th	Season 7
Jess Bush	19	Brisbane	9th/8th	Season 7
Amelia Coutts	18	Sydney	9th/8th	Season 7
Madeline Huett	22	Launceston	7th	Season 7
Izzy Vesey	21	Gold Coast	6th/5th	Season 7
Hazel O'Connell	16	Bathurst	6th/5th	Season 7
Rachel Riddell	18	Melbourne	4th	Season 7
Simone Holtznagel	17	Wollongong	3rd	Season 7
Liz Braithwaite	17	Brisbane	Runner-up	Season 7
Montana Cox	17	Melbourne	Winner	Season 7
Chanique Greyling	20	Newcastle	15th	Season 8
Taylor Henley	17	Adelaide	14th	Season 8
Rhiannon Bradshaw	19	Brisbane	13th	Season 8
Brooke Hogan	21	Melbourne	12th/11th	Season 8
April Harvey	18	Tweed Heads	12th/11th	Season 8
Taylah Roberts	18	Perth	10th (dq)	Season 8
Madeline Cowe	19	Cairns	9th	Season 8
Ashley Pogmore	18	Sydney	8th	Season 8
Shannon Richardson	18	Gold Coast	7th	Season 8
Jade Collins	20	Sydney	6th/5th	Season 8
Dajana Bogojevic	17	Queanbeyan	6th/5th	Season 8
Abbie Weir	17	Maclean	4th	Season 8
Duckie Thot	17	Melbourne	3rd	Season 8
Shanali Martin	16	Melbourne	Runner-up	Season 8
Melissa Juratowitch	16	Melbourne	Winner	Season 8
Kaitlyn Bennett	18	Mandurah	13th	Season 9
Cassie Hargrave	18	Gold Coast	12th	Season 9
Ayieda Malou	17	Perth	11th	Season 9
Phoebe Deskovic	17	Sydney	10th	Season 9
Zahra Thalari	18	Sydney	9th	Season 9
Tanahya Cohen	18	Caloundra	8th	Season 9
Izi Simundic	21	Newcastle	7th	Season 9
Jordan Burridge	17	Gold Coast	6th	Season 9
Lauren Ericson	16	Melbourne	5th	Season 9
Jess Thomas	18	Perth	4th	Season 9
Alex Sinadinovic	18	Wollongong	3rd	Season 9
Lucy Markovic †	16	Gold Coast	Runner-up	Season 9
Brittany Beattie	20	Whittlesea	Winner	Season 9
Sofie Baric	17	Hobart	13th	Season 10
Laura Taaffe	20	Perth	12th	Season 10
Summer Kane	19	Melbourne	11th	Season 10
Jordan Simek	20	Sydney	10th	Season 10
Jessie Andrewartha	21	Adelaide	9th	Season 10
Christy Baker	17	Brisbane	8th	Season 10
Vitoria Triboni	25	Sydney	7th	Season 10
Belinda Kosorok	18	Wagga Wagga	6th	Season 10
Kassidy Ure	19	Newcastle	5th	Season 10
Linnea Stevens-Jones	16	Sydney	4th	Season 10
Daisy Davies	19	Sydney	3rd	Season 10
Sabine Jamieson	17	Byron Bay	Runner-up	Season 10
Aleyna FitzGerald	16	Newcastle	Winner	Season 10
