= Australia's Next Top Model season 4 =

Australia's Next Top Model
- Season 4
- Judges: Jodhi Meares; Alex Perry; Charlotte Dawson
- No. of contestants: 13
- Winner: Demelza Reveley
- No. of episodes: 11

Release
- Original network: Fox8
- Original release: 22 April – 1 July 2008

Season chronology
- ← Previous; Season 3 Next → Season 5

The fourth season of Australia's Next Top Model premiered on 22 April 2008 on Fox8. Auditions were held during October and November 2007 across Australia. Host Jodhi Meares returned for the fourth series along with judges Alex Perry and Charlotte Dawson, while Jez Smith left the show due to scheduling commitments. Two different guest judges were included at panel every week. The contestants were housed in an $8 million waterfront mansion, located in the southern Sydney suburb of Port Hacking, which the contestants moved into on 25 January 2008.

The prizes for this season included a one-year modelling contract with Priscilla's Model Management in Sydney, an all expenses paid trip to New York City to meet with top international agencies, a Ford Fiesta Zetec, a one-year contract to be the face of Napoleon Perdis Cosmetics, and an eight-page fashion spread in Vogue Australia.

The winner of the competition was 16-year-old Demelza Reveley from Wollongong.

== Season summary ==
=== Requirements ===
Much like in the previous season, all contestants had to be aged 16 or older to be eligible for the show. Those auditioning were required to have a minimum height of at least 172 centimetres (68 in) tall. To qualify, all applicants had to be Australian citizens residing in Australia. Additional requirements stated that contestants should not have had prior experience as a model in a national campaign within the last five years. If a contestant was represented by an agent or a manager, she had to terminate that representation prior to the competition.

== Cast ==
=== Contestants ===
(Ages stated are at start of contest)

Contestant	Age	Height	Hometown	Finish	Place
Kamila Markowska	17	173 cm (5 ft 8 in)	Adelaide	Episode 1	13
Kristy Coulcher	19	179 cm (5 ft 10 1/2 in)	Sydney	Episode 2	12
Emma O’Sullivan	17	182 cm (5 ft 11 1/2 in)	Pottsville	Episode 3	11
Belinda Hodge	17	178 cm (5 ft 10 in)	Ballan	Episode 4	10
Alamela Rowan	17	174 cm (5 ft 8 1/2 in)	Byron Bay	Episode 5	9
Leiden Kronemberger	18	182 cm (5 ft 11 1/2 in)	Sydney	Episode 6	8–7
Jamie Lee	21	180 cm (5 ft 11 in)	Adelaide	Episode 6	8–7
Rebecca Jobson	18	173 cm (5 ft 8 in)	Wollongong	Episode 7	6
Alyce Crawford	17	171 cm (5 ft 7 1/2 in)	Kiama	Episode 8	5
Caris Eves	19	173 cm (5 ft 8 in)	Inglewood	Episode 9	4
Samantha Downie	20	176 cm (5 ft 9 1/2 in)	Rowville	Episode 10	3
Alexandra Girdwood	20	178 cm (5 ft 10 in)	Sydney	Episode 11	2
Demelza Reveley	16	178 cm (5 ft 10 in)	Wollongong	Episode 11	1

=== Judges ===
- Jodhi Meares
- Charlotte Dawson
- Alex Perry

=== Other cast members ===
- Jonathan Pease – style director, model mentor

== Episodes ==
No. overall	No. in season	Title	Original release date
30	1	"Are You Model Material?"	22 April 2008
The top thirteen contestants faced off in groups before the judges to make a good first impression. After a swimsuit photo shoot in a studio, the contestants moved into the model mansion. For the challenge, the contestants had to portray various characters for the show's promotional launch, and Alyce was performing the best and was granted immunity from elimination. The contestants were later introduced to Vogue Australia editor Kirstie Clements, and were shot in a group for a feature in the Australian Vogue website, Kamila became the first contestant sent home.: Special guests: Fabrizio Lipari, Travis Conneeley, Kirstie Clements, Priscilla Leighton-Clarke, Jason Capobianco, Victoria Collison; Featured photographer: Jason Capobianco
31	2	"Transformation - from Girls to Models"	29 April 2008
The contestants received makeovers and prepared for a runway show onboard HMAS Melbourne in front of an audience of sailors to win a shopping spree valued at $11,000. They later had a beauty shoot for Napoleon Perdis cosmetics in which they were splashed with a mist of water, Kristy became the second contestant sent home.: Special guests: Hamish Glianos, Steven Hughes, Jordan Loukas, Stephanie Hart, Napoleon Perdis, Trelise Cooper; Featured photographer: Jackie Mieling
32	3	"Fears & Fitness"	6 May 2008
The contestants met Olympic champion and fashion designer Ian Thorpe for a fitness session, before facing their phobias in a standing parade for Rexona. The winners of the challenge were rewarded with a trip to the David Jones fashion show, and were given the chance to meet Megan Gale after her final catwalk appearance. At the shoot, the models had to scale a wall 30 feet in the air wearing Mary-Kyri shoes, Emma became the third contestant sent home.: Special guests: Ian Thorpe, Emma Hutton, Sarah Ford, Collette Dinnigan, Kirrily Johnson, Melissa Hoyer, Megan Gale, Mary Kyri, Peter Morrissey; Featured photographer: Simon Upton
33	4	"Reality Bites"	13 May 2008
The top ten contestants met Mink Sadowsky and industry stylist Trevor Stones for a runway lesson. Back at the house, several of the contestants began to antagonize Alamela. After a round of go sees overseen by Jodhi Meares and Priscilla Leighton-Clarke, some of the contestants were rewarded with a photo shoot for Body and Soul magazine. Conflict escalated between Alamela and the winners of the challenge, which later came to a head after a lookbook shoot for Alex Perry. At panel, the judges discussed the distasteful behaviour taking place in the model house, Belinda became the fourth contestant sent home.: Special guests: Mink Sadowsky, Trevor Stones, Priscilla Leighton-Clarke, Bowie Wong, Marnie Skillings, Nicola Finetti, Laura Gorun; Featured photographer: Georges Antoni
34	5	"Working the Brand"	20 May 2008
Before the start of the episode, Jodhi Meares spoke to the viewers about the aspects of bullying and the behaviour from the previous episode. After an apology from Demelza to Alamela, the contestants met Jonathan Pease at Naked Communications for a role-playing exercise in which they had to understand the concepts and values of different fashion brands. They later had a photo shoot for Ford Fiesta in which they had to embody different personas in groups. After receiving packages from their loved ones, the winners of the challenge were flown to Brisbane for a Myer fashion parade and lunch. The last task of the week involved starring in a commercial for U by Kotex's controversial "love your beaver" campaign, Alamela became the fifth contestant sent home.: Special guests: Adam Ferrier, Vanessa Briese, Zoe Carr, Kate Meyer, Peter Morissey; Featured photographer: Marvin Joseph; Featured director: Monty Noble
35	6	"Move Your Body"	27 May 2008
The top eight contestants took part in dancing lessons, Leiden had a tantrum during the dance lessons, and later paraded to The Potbelleez playing live for a Levi's promotion. Jamie and Alyce were the winners of the challenge were given the chance to star in a music video with Seany B. For the photo shoot the contestants had to pose with male models for Peter Alexander's new line of sleepwear, only six contestants can go to Fiji, Alyce, Jamie and Leiden were in the bottom three, due to their poor effort, however, Alyce were spared.: Special guests: Juliette Verne, Kane Bonke, Leah Howard, Seany B, Matt Taylor, Mark Simpson, Targa Sahyoun, Peter Alexander; Featured photographer: Juli Balla
36	7	"Tropical Top Model"	3 June 2008
The top six contestants travelled to the islands of Fiji to visit Nadi, and had a runway show on the aisle of the aeroplane. Upon arriving to Fiji, the contestants had a photo shoot challenge at the resort - the winner of which was rewarded with a day at the spa with a friend while the losers cleaned the villa. For the main photo shoot, the models were photographed by Russell James wearing Tigerlily swimwear, Rebecca became the eighth contestant sent home.: Special guest: Gail Elliott; Featured photographers: Chris Ferguson (challenge), Russell James (photoshoot)
37	8	"Fashion Wars"	10 June 2008
Jodhi Meares and Brazilian stylist Fernando Frisoni met the contestants for a styling lesson before sending them off to meet Vogue editor Kristie Clements to fine-tune their newfound knowledge. They later had a styling and fashion challenge which involved creating outfits for different occasions and matching garnments to their appropriate designer. The winners of the challenge were treated to a day out at the Gold Coast with fashion designer Wayne Cooper before heading off to a Fashion Award ceremony. For the photo shoot, the models arrived at Tamarama Beach to shoot for Oyster magazine, Alyce became the ninth contestant sent home: Special Guests: Fernando Frisoni, Kirstie Clements, Kate Waterhouse, Wayne Cooper, Rachael Squires, Grant Pearce; Featured photographer: Bec Parsons
38	9	"Media Manners"	17 June 2008
The top four contestants were taught about dealing with media and paparazzi during a mock red carpet challenge in which they were interviewed by Ian Thorpe and Charlotte Dawson. They later had an interview challenge with the journalists of real newspapers and magazines. The winner was invited to a Puma launch party with a friend of her choosing while the losers served finger-food, before taking part in a radio interview for Nova. At the photo shoot, the contestants wore eclectic designs created by students at Sydney TAFE Ultimo College, Carys became the tenth contestant sent home.: Special Guests: Merrick & Rosso, Kate Ritchie, Alex Needs, Fiona Byrne, Ian Thorpe, Shelly Horton, Shane Sutton; Featured photographer: Paul Westlake
39	10	"New York, New York"	24 June 2008
The top three contestants were flown to New York City, and attended castings for Marilyn, MC2 Model Management and Elite Model Management. They later participated in a fashion show for Malan Breton, where last years winner Alice Burdeu made an appearance to offer her advice to the models. For the final photo shoot, the contestants were made up by Napoleon Perdis and stylist Bryan Marryshow for a stylish editorial session with a taxi in the streets of New York. Back in Australia, the judges selected Alexandra and Demelza as the final two, Samantha became the last contestant sent home.: Special guests: Kwok Chan, Greg Francis, Jean Luc Brunel, Roman Young, Neal Hamil, Malan Breton, Alice Burdeu, Napoleon Perdis, Bryan Marryshow, Grant Pearce; Featured photographer: Antoine Verglas
40	11	"And Australia's Next Top Model is..."	1 July 2008
The live finale was broadcast from Luna Park Sydney, with Charlotte Dawson acting as the finale's host. The show reunited the eliminated contestants, and the final two were interviewed by the judges and fashion experts regarding their plans and moments on the show. Later, the final two were shown going to castings for Australian Fashion Week. After some feedback and a runway show with all of the contestants, the judges had one last look at the final two's bodies of work. Brian McFadden performed his new single "Twisted", and the judges began to cast their votes. On a telecast from Paris, season 3 winner Alice Burdeu the revealed that the winner of the competition was Demelza.: Special guests: Brian McFadden, Kirstie Clements, Napoleon Perdis, Priscilla Leighton-Clarke, Alice Burdeu

== Summaries ==
=== Elimination table ===
Order	Episodes										
Order	1 (Note: In episode 1, Alyce won immunity from elimination after winning the reward challenge.)	2	3	4	5	6 (Note: Episode 6 featured a double elimination with the bottom three contestants being in danger of elimination.)	7	8	9	10	11
1	Alyce	Rebecca	Caris	Samantha	Jamie	Caris	Demelza	Samantha	Demelza	Alexandra	Demelza
2	Demelza	Alexandra	Alamela	Caris	Samantha	Demelza	Samantha	Alexandra	Samantha	Demelza	Alexandra
3	Alamela	Emma	Alexandra	Alamela	Caris	Samantha	Caris	Demelza	Alexandra	Samantha	
4	Caris	Samantha	Rebecca	Alyce	Alexandra	Alexandra	Alexandra	Caris	Caris		
5	Leiden	Caris	Jamie	Alexandra	Leiden	Rebecca	Alyce	Alyce			
6	Belinda	Jamie	Alyce	Demelza	Demelza	Alyce	Rebecca				
7	Alexandra	Alyce	Demelza	Leiden	Rebecca	Jamie; Leiden					
8	Kristy	Leiden	Samantha	Jamie	Alyce	Jamie; Leiden					
9	Jamie	Alamela	Belinda	Rebecca	Alamela						
10	Rebecca	Demelza	Leiden	Belinda							
11	Samantha	Belinda	Emma								
12	Emma	Kristy									
13	Kamila										

The contestant was immune from elimination.
The contestant was eliminated.
The contestant won the competition.

=== Bottom two ===
Episode	Contestants	Eliminated
1	Emma & Kamila	Kamila
2	Belinda & Kristy	Kristy
3	Emma & Leiden	Emma
4	Belinda & Rebecca	Belinda
5	Alamela & Alyce	Alamela
6	Alyce, Jamie & Leiden	Jamie
6	Alyce, Jamie & Leiden	Leiden
7	Alyce & Rebecca	Rebecca
8	Alyce & Caris	Alyce
9	Alexandra & Caris	Caris
10	Demelza & Samantha	Samantha
11	Alexandra & Demelza	Alexandra

The contestant was eliminated after her first time in the bottom two
The contestant was eliminated after her second time in the bottom two
The contestant was eliminated after her fourth time in the bottom
The contestant was eliminated in the final judging and placed as the runner-up

=== Average call-out order ===
Final two is not included.

Rank by average	Place	Model	Call-out total	Number of call-outs	Call-out average
1	4	Caris	27	9	3.00
2		Alexandra	35	10	3.50
3		Samantha	37	10	3.70
4	1	Demelza	40	10	4.00
5	9	Alamela	26	5	5.20
6	5	Alyce	42	8	5.25
7–8	6	Rebecca	42	7	6.00
7–8	7–8	Jamie	36	6	6.00
9	7–8	Leiden	42	6	7.00
10	11	Emma	26	3	8.67
11	10	Belinda	36	4	9.00
12		Kristy	20	2	10.00
13		Kamila	13	1	13.00

=== Makeovers ===
- Kristy - Mandy Moore blonde
- Emma - Angelina Jolie dark blonde
- Belinda - Twiggy light blonde and cut short
- Alamela - Louise Brooks inspired angled line bob and dyed dark red
- Jamie - Gemma Ward long straight light blonde weave
- Leiden - Mia Farrow inspired pixie cut and dyed platinum blonde
- Rebecca - Naomi Campbell long straight black weave
- Alyce - Melania Trump inspired long light brown weave
- Caris - Emma Stone red
- Samantha - Jackie O chest length cut
- Alexandra - Cleopatra inspired bob
- Demelza - Cassie Ventura inspired long layers with bangs layered

=== Photoshoot Guide ===
- Episode 1: group shot for Vogue Australia
- Episode 2: Water beauty shots for Napoleon Perdis
- Episode 3: Wall-climbing with Mary-Kyri shoes
- Episode 4: Alex Perry Lookbook
- Episode 5: kotex tampon commercials
- Episode 6: Peter Alexander (fashion designer) with male models
- Episode 7: Editorial in Fiji, Tigerlilly swimwear on the beach
- Episode 8: Oyster (magazine) editorial
- Episode 9: Haute couture
- Episode 10: New York City Editorial

=== Final votes ===
Place	Contestant	Final votes							Total votes (Note: The viewer vote totaled fifteen percent of the overall tally, with the remaining eighty-five percent being divided evenly among the 6 judges. The final tally thus rounded out to 57.5% for Demelza and 42.5% for Alexandra)
Place	Contestant	Alex (Main judge)	Charlotte (Main judge)	Jonathan (Creative director)	Napoleon (Cosmetics sponsor)	Priscilla (Winner's agency)	Kirstie (Vogue)	Public	Total votes
1	Demelza								4 (57.5%)
2	Alexandra								3 (42.5%)

== Controversies ==
This series created some controversy in regards to in-house bullying. The fourth episode, "Reality Bites", showed contestant Alamela Rowan being taunted by Demelza Reveley, Rebecca Jobson and Alyce Crawford, with Reveley and Jobson in particular causing Rowan to become visibly upset. During the episode, Reveley proceeded to pour and throw water balloons at Rowan in a bid to get her to "open up" because she "just didn't get her". Another contestant, Alexandra Girdwood said in the episode that ironically, Reveley had changed schools several times because she herself had been a victim of bullying.

Reveley, Crawford, and Jobson were christened the "Dapto Dogs" by judge Charlotte Dawson during the judging following the incident. Belinda Hodge, who was the contestant eliminated that episode, had defended Rowan on several occasions and was later praised by numerous media outlets for not "jumping the bandwagon" and bullying Rowan. After the episode aired there was an immediate media backlash in regard to the limited response toward the contestants involved in the bullying. It was stated by leading Australian Psychologist Michael Carr Gregg that the show did not properly handle the behavior of Reveley and the other contestants. It was also alleged that Fox8 downplayed the events with reports that in addition to what was televised, Reveley put condoms filled with mayonnaise in Rowan's bed and chili in her breakfast cereal.

At the beginning of the following episode, "Working the Brand", host Jodhi Meares appeared in a message to viewers before the start of the episode explaining that the events of the previous week were examples of natural teenage behavior and the team behind Australia's Next Top Model did not support nor condone the behavior. Reveley apologized to Rowan on camera, but also stated in a confessional that the incident had been "blown out of proportion". Rowan was ultimately eliminated that same episode.
