= Australia's Next Top Model season 3 =

Australia's Next Top Model
- Season 3
- Judges: Jodhi Meares; Alex Perry; Charlotte Dawson; Jez Smith
- No. of contestants: 13
- Winner: Alice Burdeu
- No. of episodes: 11

Release
- Original network: Fox8
- Original release: 27 March – 5 June 2007

Season chronology
- ← Previous; Season 2 Next → Season 4

Season three of Australia's Next Top Model premiered on 27 March 2007 on Fox8. Former model and designer of swimsuit collection Tigerlily, Jodhi Meares replaced Erika Heynatz as the host of the show after the latter was involved in a breach of contract following her appearance on the Seven Network series It Takes Two in 2006. Alex Perry was the only incumbent judge to return in the third series. Also joining the panel for the first time were international photographer Jez Smith, and ex-model and TV personality Charlotte Dawson. Fashion photographer Georges Antoni and fashion producer Victoria Fisher were replaced this year by these new judges.

The prizes for this season included a one-year modelling contract with Priscilla's Model Management in Sydney, a trip to New York City to meet with another top model booker, a Ford Fiesta XR4, a contract to be the face of Napoleon Perdis for one year, and an eight-page fashion spread in Vogue Australia.

The winner of the competition was 18-year-old Alice Burdeu from Melbourne.

== Series summary ==
=== Format changes ===
The show went underwent a series of changes this season, beginning with the introduction of a fan favourite voting system. Shortly after a new episode aired, Foxtel users were able to cast their vote via the Red Button or SMS for who they thought was "Australia's Favourite Top Model". Jordan Loukas was later announced to be the winner of the fan vote during the show's finale.

=== Live finale ===
For the first time in the show's history, the finale was held live. Viewers were allowed to have a say in who won the overall prize of Australia's Next Top Model by phoning in or using SMS to vote for either Alice or Steph H. during the lead-up week to the finale. The viewers vote counted for 15% of the total vote to determine the winner while the other 85% was determined through the vote of eight judges, including representatives from Vogue Australia, Priscilla's Model Management and Napoleon Perdis.

=== Requirements ===
Beginning this season, the minimum age requirement for participation in the show was lowered from eighteen to sixteen. Those auditioning were required to have a minimum height of at least 172 centimetres (68 in) tall. To qualify, all applicants had to be Australian citizens residing in Australia. Additional requirements stated that contestants should not have had prior experience as a model in a national campaign within the last five years. If a contestant was represented by an agent or a manager, she had to terminate that representation prior to the competition.

== Cast ==
=== Contestants ===
(Ages stated are at start of contest)

| Contestant | Age | Height | Hometown | Finish | Place |
|---|---|---|---|---|---|
| Jaimi Smith | 18 | 177 cm (5 ft 9 1/2 in) | Adelaide | Episode 1 | 13 (quit) |
| Cobi Marsh | 17 | 173 cm (5 ft 8 in) | Melbourne | Episode 1 | 12 |
| Cassandra Hughes | 18 | 185 cm (6 ft 1 in) | Emu Plains | Episode 2 | 11 |
| Kara Taylor | 19 | 175 cm (5 ft 9 in) | South Coast | Episode 3 | 10 |
| Steph Flockhart | 17 | 173 cm (5 ft 8 in) | Brisbane | Episode 4 | 9 |
| Jane Williamson | 19 | 183 cm (6 ft 0 in) | Adelaide | Episode 5 | 8 |
| Sophie Wittingslow | 19 | 181 cm (5 ft 11 1/2 in) | Rye | Episode 6 | 7 |
| Danica Brown | 16 | 180 cm (5 ft 11 in) | Gold Coast | Episode 7 | 6 |
| Paloma Rodriguez | 16 | 177 cm (5 ft 9 1/2 in) | Newcastle | Episode 8 | 5 |
| Anika Salerno | 20 | 173 cm (5 ft 8 in) | Beaudesert | Episode 9 | 4 |
| Jordan Loukas | 17 | 172 cm (5 ft 7 1/2 in) | Sydney | Episode 10 | 3 |
| Steph Hart | 16 | 173 cm (5 ft 8 in) | Central Coast | Episode 11 | 2 |
| Alice Burdeu | 18 | 185 cm (6 ft 1 in) | Melbourne | Episode 11 | 1 |

=== Judges ===
- Jodhi Meares
- Alex Perry
- Charlotte Dawson
- Jez Smith

=== Other cast members ===
- Jonathan Pease – style director, model mentor

== Episodes ==
| No. overall | No. in season | Title | Original release date |
|---|---|---|---|
| 19 | 1 | "Models 101" | 27 March 2007 |
The top 12 contestants sized each other up before being given a series of photo shoots while the judges monitored their performance in a separate room. They were later given a chance to meet the judges face to face before moving into their new home. The first challenge of the competition required the contestants to play different characters for the series' promotional launch. For the photo shoot, the models posed in a group wearing elegant dresses, Jaimi decided the quit the competition due to her homesick, then Cobi became the second contestant sent home.: Special guests: Travis Conneeley, Priscilla Leighton Clark, Beth Levis; Featured photographers: Fabrizio Lipari, Georges Antoni
| 20 | 2 | "Know Your Body" | 3 April 2007 |
The contestants met their personal trainer for the first time and had their measurements taken before a yoga session. Back at the model house, they all received Brazilian waxes. For the challenge, the models were dressed in Pleasure State lingerie as they attempted to hold a pose for five minutes in front of a live audience. The contestants later took part in a photo shoot with judge Jez Smith in a pool wearing swimwear from Jodhi Meares' collection, Tigerlily, Cassandra has broken the behaviour rules became the third contestant sent home.: Special guests: Andreas Lundin, Darren Ma, Dominic Morency, Susie Burrell; Featured photographer: Jez Smith
| 21 | 3 | "Transformation" | 10 April 2007 |
The contestants received makeovers, and were given a makeup lesson by Napoleon Perdis that emphasized the importance of simplicity. The contestants later put their knowledge to the test in a makeup and styling challenge in which the winners were given the chance to attend a party while the losers catered it. At the shoot the contestants were stripped to their barest essentials for a simplistic beauty shoot, Kara became the fourth contestant sent home.: Special guests: Dario Cotroneo, Napoleon Perdis; Featured photographer: Jordan Graham
| 22 | 4 | "The Model Walk" | 17 April 2007 |
The contestants attended the cinema to watch supermodels strut down the runway, before being given a catwalk lesson by Mink Sadowsky in preparation for an upcoming challenge at the Queen Victoria Building. The winner of the challenge was given the chance to attend the David Jones Winter Launch 07. For the photo shoot, the contestants walked down the runway as the camera captured their best angles, Steph F. became the fifth contestant sent home.: Special guests: Mink Sadowsky, Lauren Gillis, Dario Cotroneo, Melissa Hoyer, Peter Morrissey, Samantha Brett, Terry Biviano; Featured photographer: Kristian Dowling
| 23 | 5 | "Know Your Product" | 24 April 2007 |
The top eight contestants attended a workout session before learning the difference between editorial and commercial modelling. They then attended an audition for the new Impulse New York Sass range created by Kindred, and posed in a black and white photo shoot with a Ford Fiesta, Jane became the sixth contestant sent home.: Special guests: Andreas Lundin, Katie, Liz Murphy, Ranita Row, Andy Healy, Ian Thorpe; Featured photographer: Kane Skennar
| 24 | 6 | "Know Your Fashion" | 1 May 2007 |
The top seven contestants were quizzed on their fashion knowledge before being sent to the Sydney Fashion Design Studio to practice wearing different outfits. They later met Vogue editor Kirstie Clements to learn what was in style during the fashion season, and took part in a styling challenge to impress Clements. At the shoot, the models were fitted into avant garde designs with the task of interpreting the garnments and bringing them to life for the camera, Sophie became the seventh contestant sent home, due to behaviour rules been broken.: Special guests: Nicholas Huxley, Wayne Cooper, Kirstie Clements, Ayesha Makim; Featured photographer: Jez Smith
| 25 | 7 | "Model Behaviour" | 8 May 2007 |
Jodhi Meares and Charlotte Dawson visited the contestants to give them tips on how to deal with the paparazzi, and the contestants attended an etiquette class with Melissa Hoyer and Alex Zabotto-Bentley. They then had an "off day" from filming in which they were secretly followed by paparazzi and later confronted with the photos. In honor of Mother's Day, the contestants were treated with visits from their mothers, and later posed with them for the photo shoot, Danica became the eighth contestant sent home.: Special guests: Melissa Hoyer, Alex Zabotto-Bentley, Ben McDonald, Barry Hall, Adam Schneider; Featured photographer: Daniel Smith
| 26 | 8 | "Movement" | 15 May 2007 |
The top five contestants learned that the weeks theme was movement and dance, and headed to a dance studio to learn some new moves. They later posed for the camera inside of a lightbox with the goal of filling the entire space with dynamic poses. A second photo shoot saw the contestants harnessed in the air for a fashionable recreation of Mary Poppins, Paloma became the ninth contestant sent home for foul behaviour.: Special guests: Ramon Doringo, Andreas Lundin; Featured photographers: Fabrizio Lipari (lightbox), Dean Tirkot (Mary Poppins)
| 27 | 9 | "Acting & Presenting" | 22 May 2007 |
The top four contestants received an acting lesson from Paul Goddard and were coached on how to present themselves by attempting to convince people at a mock cocktail party that they were Australia's Next Top Model. They later had speed go-sees with top fashion experts at a buffet and attempted to make a good impression in order to be chosen for a photo shoot in Sunday Magazine. At the shoot, the contestants were styled in men's underwear with a male model, and attempted to portray various emotions, Anika became the tenth contestant sent home.: Special guests: Paul Goddard, Sara Mulcahy, Inez Garcia, Grant Pearce, Bruno Schiavari, Andreas Lundin, Simon Upton, Ian Thorpe, James Mitchell; Featured photographers: Lyn Balzer, Tony Perkins
| 28 | 10 | "Los Angeles" | 29 May 2007 |
The top three contestants were flown to Los Angeles for the final leg of the competition. Fresh off the plane, the models were sent for a meeting at Napoleon Perdis' store to pose as live mannequins. They later had go-sees with some of Los Angeles' top agencies, before taking part in a glamorous high end photo shoot at a Hollywood Hills mansion. Back in Australia, the judges decided who would be the final two that will be chosen to advance to the live final, Jordan became the last contestant sent home for after having profanity.: Special guests: Napoleon Perdis, Mandi Line, Kenya Knight, Crista Klayman, Ashley Paige, Kym Wilson, Dom Deluca, Charlie Altuna; Featured photographer: Darren Tieste
| 29 | 11 | "The Winner" | 5 June 2007 |
The show went over never-before-seen footage of auditions that the final two attended during Australian Fashion Week. For the live segment, previously eliminated contestants were brought back for interviews and input on who they thought should win. After a final look back at some of the seasons best moments, the judges and experts began to cast their votes. The judges and viewer votes were combined, and Alice was revealed to be Australia's Next Top Model.: Special guests: Ian Thorpe, Kirstie Clements, Priscilla Leighton-Clark, Napoleon Perdis, Alex Zabotto-Bentley

== Summaries ==
=== Elimination table ===
| Order | Episodes | | | | | | | | | | |
| Order | 1 (Note: In episode 1, Jaimi quit the competition during judging. She was replaced by Kara after Cobi's elimination.) | 2 | 3 | 4 | 5 | 6 | 7 | 8 | 9 | 10 | 11 |
|---|---|---|---|---|---|---|---|---|---|---|---|
| 1 | Anika | Jordan | Paloma | Anika | Jordan | Alice | Anika | Jordan | Steph H. | Alice | Alice |
| 2 | Steph H. | Steph H. | Danica | Alice | Steph H. | Steph H. | Alice | Anika | Alice | Steph H. | Steph H. |
| 3 | Jordan | Steph F. | Steph F. | Jordan | Paloma | Paloma | Jordan | Alice | Jordan | Jordan | |
| 4 | Alice | Alice | Alice | Steph H. | Sophie | Jordan | Steph H. | Steph H. | Anika | | |
| 5 | Cassandra | Jane | Anika | Paloma | Danica | Danica | Paloma | Paloma | | | |
| 6 | Sophie | Anika | Jane | Sophie | Anika | Anika | Danica | | | | |
| 7 | Danica | Danica | Steph H. | Danica | Alice | Sophie | | | | | |
| 8 | Paloma | Kara | Sophie | Jane | Jane | | | | | | |
| 9 | Jane | Sophie | Jordan | Steph F. | | | | | | | |
| 10 | Steph F. | Paloma | Kara | | | | | | | | |
| 11 | Cobi | Cassandra | | | | | | | | | |
| 12 | Jaimi | | | | | | | | | | |

The contestant quit the competition
The contestant was eliminated
The contestant won the competition

=== Bottom two ===
| Episode | Contestants | Eliminated |
|---|---|---|
| 1 | Cobi & Steph F. | Jaimi |
| 1 | Cobi & Steph F. | Cobi |
| 2 | Cassandra & Paloma | Cassandra |
| 3 | Jordan & Kara | Kara |
| 4 | Jane & Steph F. | Steph F. |
| 5 | Alice & Jane | Jane |
| 6 | Anika & Sophie | Sophie |
| 7 | Danica & Paloma | Danica |
| 8 | Paloma & Steph H. | Paloma |
| 9 | Anika & Jordan | Anika |
| 10 | Jordan & Steph H. | Jordan |
| 11 | Alice & Steph H. | Steph H. |

The contestant was eliminated after her first time in the bottom two
The contestant was eliminated after her second time in the bottom two
The contestant was eliminated after her third time in the bottom two
The contestant quit the competition
The contestant was eliminated in the final judging and placed as the runner-up

=== Average call-out order ===
Final two is not included.

| Rank by average | Place | Model | Call-out total | Number of call-outs | Call-out average |
|---|---|---|---|---|---|
| 1–2 | 1 | Alice | 30 | 10 | 3.00 |
| 1–2 | 2 | Steph H. | 30 | 10 | 3.00 |
| 3 | | Jordan | 31 | 10 | 3.10 |
| 4 | | Anika | 32 | 9 | 3.56 |
| 5 | | Paloma | 40 | 8 | 5.00 |
| 6 | | Danica | 39 | 7 | 5.57 |
| 7 | 9 | Steph F. | 25 | 4 | 6.25 |
| 8 | 7 | Sophie | 40 | 6 | 6.67 |
| 9 | 8 | Jane | 36 | 5 | 7.20 |
| 10 | 11 | Cassandra | 16 | 2 | 8.00 |
| 11 | 10 | Kara | 18 | 2 | 9.00 |
| 12 | | Cobi | 11 | 1 | 11.00 |
| 13 | | Jaimi | —N/a | —N/a | —N/a |

=== Photoshoot Guide ===
- Episode 1 Photo Shoot: Street, Bikini and Elegant shots; Group shoot
- Episode 2 Photo Shoot: Tigerlily Swimwear
- Episode 3 Photo Shoot: Natural Beauty Shot
- Episode 4 Photo Shoot: Runway
- Episode 5 Photo Shoot: Editorial poses with a Ford Fiesta
- Episode 6 Photo Shoot: Fashion as Art
- Episode 7 Photo Shoot: Relationships with Mothers
- Episode 8 Photo Shoots: Posing in a light Box; Flying Mary Poppins
- Episode 9 Photo Shoot: Emotions in Menswear
- Episode 10 Photo Shoot: Modern Hollywood Glamour

=== Makeovers ===
- Kara - Christy Turlington inspired shoulder length cut and dyed dark brown
- Stephanie F. - Cameron Diaz inspired bob and dyed brown
- Jane - Natalie Portman inspired pixie cut and dyed purple
- Sophie - Elle MacPherson inspired dark blonde weave
- Danica - Nicky Hilton inspired shoulder length hair
- Paloma - Ashlee Simpson inspired angled line bob
- Anika - Nicole Kidman dyed light red
- Jordan - Gisele Bündchen light brown weave
- Stephanie H. - Jennifer Aniston inspired shoulder length cut and dyed back to blonde
- Alice - Lucille Ball inspired strawberry blonde and bangs layered

=== Final votes ===
| Place | Contestant | Final votes | | | | | | | | | Total votes (Note: The viewer vote totaled fifteen percent of the overall tally, with the remaining eighty-five percent being divided evenly among the 8 judges. The final tally thus rounded out to 68.1% for Alice and 31.9% for Steph H. The combined votes of the judges who voted in favor of Alice (53.1%) carried the vote in her favor, as even with the viewer vote added to Steph's total of 31.9 it would not have been mathematically possible for Steph to win.) |
| Place | Contestant | Jodhi (Main judge) | Alex (Main judge) | Charlotte (Main judge) | Jez (Main judge) | Jonathan (Creative director) | Napoleon (Cosmetics sponsor) | Priscilla (Winner's agency) | Kirstie (Vogue) | Public | Total votes |
|---|---|---|---|---|---|---|---|---|---|---|---|
| 1 | Alice | | | | | | | | | | 6 (68.1%) |
| 2 | Steph H. | | | | | | | | | | 3 (31.9%) |
