= Samantha Downie =

Australian model (born 1987)

- Born: 21 November 1987 (age 38); Melbourne, Victoria, Australia
- Modelling information
- Height: 1.76 m (5 ft 9 in)
- Hair colour: Black
- Eye colour: Green
- Agency: Priscilla's Model Management and Giant Management also Scene Model Agency

Samantha Downie (born 21 November 1987 in Melbourne, Victoria) is an Australian model, who participated of the fourth cycle of Australia's Next Top Model.

== Australia's Next Top Model ==
Downie was a contestant on Australian reality show, Australia's Next Top Model in 2008. Downie was considered the "dark horse" of the series by the judges but Downie performed consistently throughout the series. Towards the end of the series, her photos began to receive universal praise from the judges and Downie also received two first-call outs, which was the highest for Cycle 4 (tied with Caris Eves and Demelza Reveley.)

During the competition, Downie was featured in a Seany B video clip for her new song after she was selected by Jamie Lee to join her on the shoot. During a shoot for Peter Alexander pyjamas, Peter asked Downie to go topless and was impressed by her willingness to do something very difficult for some models and stated that he would love to work with her again. During the weekly challenge in episode 9, the models were interviewed by a number of journalists. Downie's down to earth personality won her her first and only challenge win; she won an invite to the Puma party and an interview with Nova 96.9's Merrick & Rosso with Kate Ritchie breakfast show.

In episode 10, while in New York, Downie was praised for her body and her warm personality but some modelling agencies stated that she might be too commercial. She was featured in a Malan Breton Collection Retrospective in this episode.

Downie was eliminated in episode 10 after being deemed too commercial and not as high fashion compared to Alexandra Girdwood and Demelza Reveley.

During the finale of Australia's Next Top Model Cycle 4, Downie was voted Australia's Favourite Top Model and won $5,000

== Career ==
Samantha was signed to Priscilla's Model Management weeks before the program ended. She is the face of model-turned-designer Gail Elliott's fashion brand 'Little Joe' and has done a fashion editorial for Miss T Designs for the Autumn/Winter and Spring/Summer 2008 collection.

Downie walked in Alex Perry's Spring/Summer 2009 Fashion Show, Flamingo Sands Spring/Summer 2009 fashion show during Australian Fashion Week. Downie was also walked in Kaleidescape's Spring 2008 runway show. In the July issue of Oyster Magazine, she was featured in an editorial spread alongside Caris Eves and Alexandra Girdwood. Downie appeared in an editorial spread for the Fashion Journal.

Alex Perry announced that Samantha will model, alongside Demelza Reveley and Alexandra Girdwood, at his Charity fashion show on 17 August 2008 to help raise money for the McGrath Foundation. She had a small cameo on Episode 10 of Project Runway Australia.

Samantha appeared on Channel V's WhatUWant on 9 September 2008; She was a model for make-up artist Rae Morris. Samantha appeared in an editorial campaign for the new collection for Little Joe by Gail Elliott. In late 2008, Downie appeared in an editorial summer 2008/2009 campaign for Kookai and a Nivea SunSense campaign which is advertised on the side of buses, billboards and trams in Australia. Downie recently shot an advertisement for Kayser Underwear advertisement as well as a 4-page editorial spread in issue 60 of Attitude Magazine.

In 2009, Downie walked in the Sportsgirl Ready To Wear, Fall/Winter fashion show, Life With Bird Ready To Wear, Fall/Winter fashion show and Fairbanks Ready To Wear, Autumn/Winter fashion show. Downie also appeared in the premiere episode of Australia's Next Top Model, Cycle 5.

In the 2009 Rosemount Australian Fashion Week, Downie walked for J'Aton, Illionaire, Jenny Bannister, Stevie, and White Charlie, Ready to wear Autumn/Winter 2009, and most recently; the David Jones spring fashion launch event in Sydney as well as Myer's Spring Carnival events in Sydney. In November 2009, Downie was a featured model for Anton Jewellery launch and a campaign for Watersun Swimwear.

In 2010, international fashion designer Malan Breton named Samantha Downie "the most beautiful women in the world!". Also, in 2010, Downie was featured in a campaign for Mountain High, a campaign for El Amuleto and Downie also walked for David Jones' Autumn/Winter 2010 collection, alongside Miranda Kerr, and at the L'oreal Melbourne Fashion Festival. Downie also appeared in a national campaign for Jeans West and State of Georgia.

== Personal life ==
Downie is a university student at Monash University studying a Bachelor of business and commerce and Downie hopes to work in human resources. In June 2010, Downie completed her last semester at Monash University. She is of half-Indian ancestry. In July 2010, Downie revealed that she was now engaged to her boyfriend of over five years. She is now dating Mark Casey.
