= Alice Burdeu =

Australian fashion model

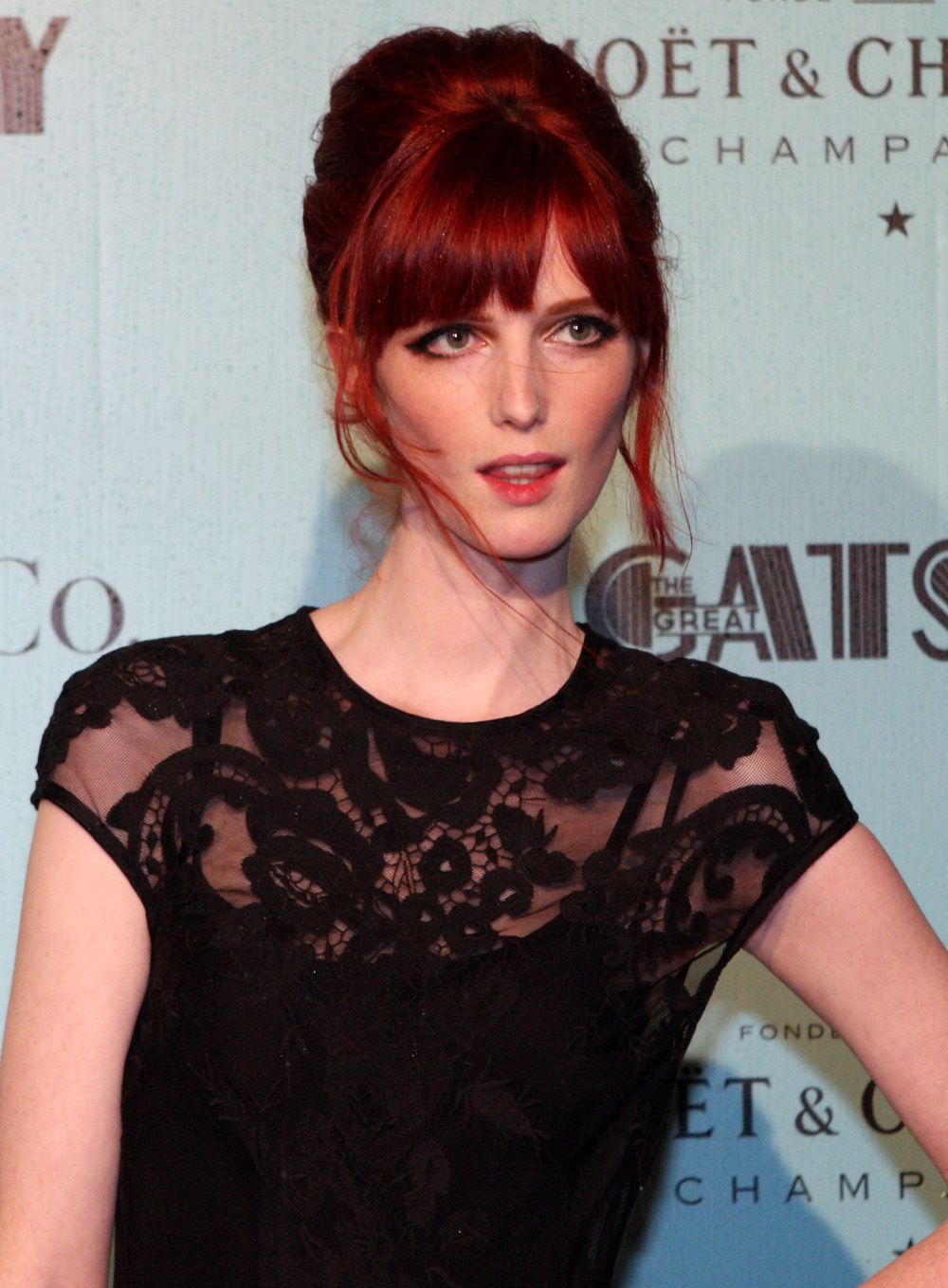
- Burdeu at the Sydney premiere of The Great Gatsby in May 2013
- Born: Alice Burdeu; 27 January 1988 (age 38); Melbourne, Victoria, Australia
- Occupation: Model
- Years active: 2007–present
- Modeling information
- Height: 6 ft (183 cm)
- Hair color: Red
- Eye color: Blue
- Agency: Chic Management

Alice Burdeu (born 27 January 1988) is an Australian former fashion model who won the third cycle of Australia's Next Top Model.

== Early life ==
Burdeu was born in Melbourne, Victoria. Prior to auditioning for Australia's Next Top Model, she worked as a customer service trainee with Telstra.

== Australia's Next Top Model ==
Burdeu first came to the spotlight as a contestant on the third cycle of Australia's Next Top Model. She quickly gained the favor of the judges, notably Alex Perry, though some concerns were raised early on in the competition due to her low body mass index. In a live finale broadcast on 5 June 2007, Burdeu was named winner of the cycle based on votes cast by the judges and by Australia's Next Top Model viewers.

Burdeu's prizes as the winner included a one-year contract with Priscilla's Model Management, a contract to become the face of Napoleon Perdis, an eight-page fashion feature in Vogue Australia, a trip to New York City, and a Ford Fiesta XR4. Her campaign photos for Napoleon Perdis were displayed in the makeup artist's stores across Australia and New Zealand. In addition to the guaranteed eight-page editorial, Vogue Australia featured Burdeu on the cover of the magazine—an honor that has not been bestowed on any other Australia's Next Top Model winner.

Burdeu made a cameo appearance in the penultimate episode of cycle 4 of Australia's Next Top Model while the series was on location in New York City, giving her opinion on the cycle's final three competitors. In the finale of the same cycle, Burdeu announced the winner of the series in a live broadcast from Paris, where she was working at the time. In 2009 Burdeu appeared in episode 9 of cycle 5 as a guest judge.

== Career ==
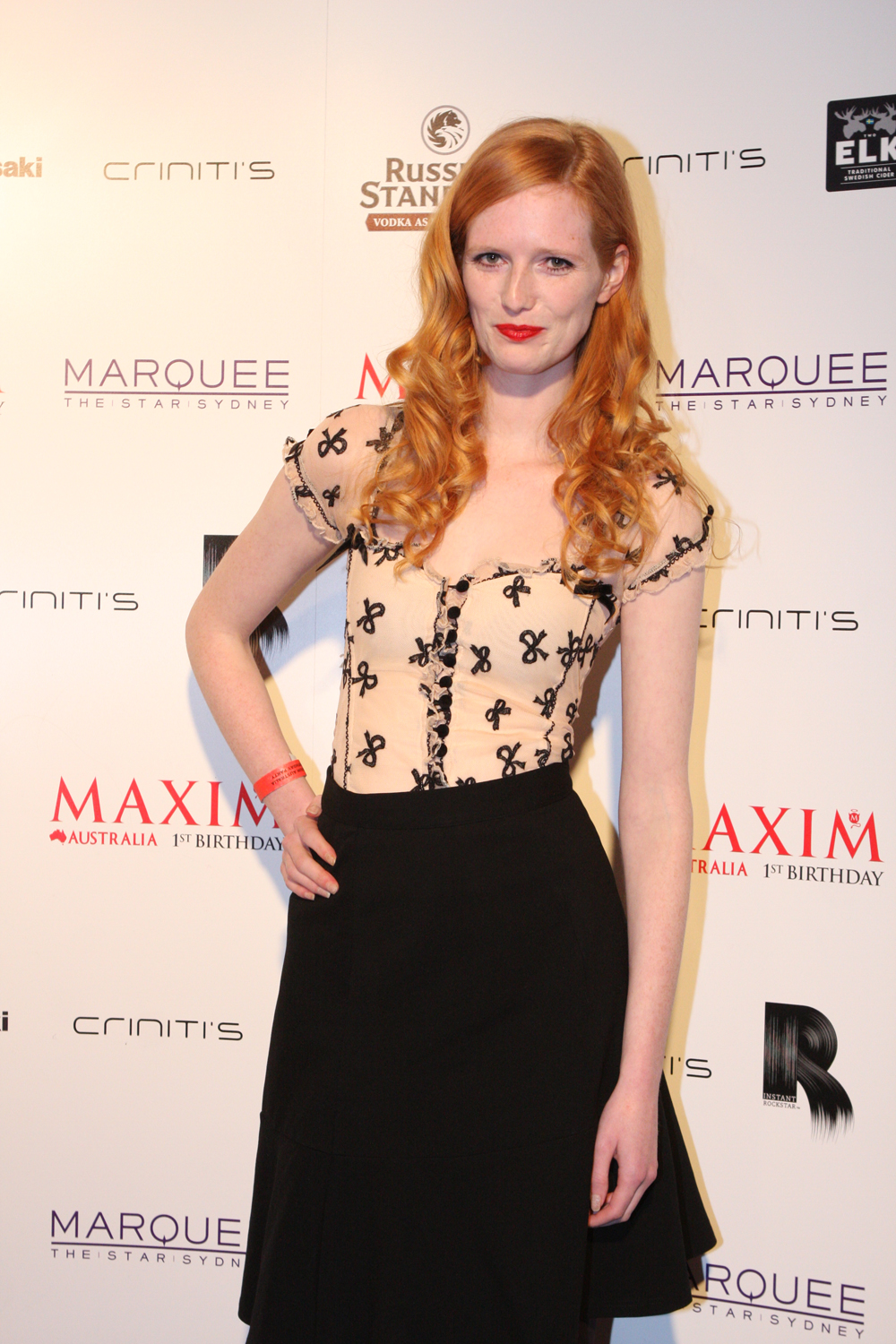
Burdeu at Maxim party in 2012 at Sydney, Australia

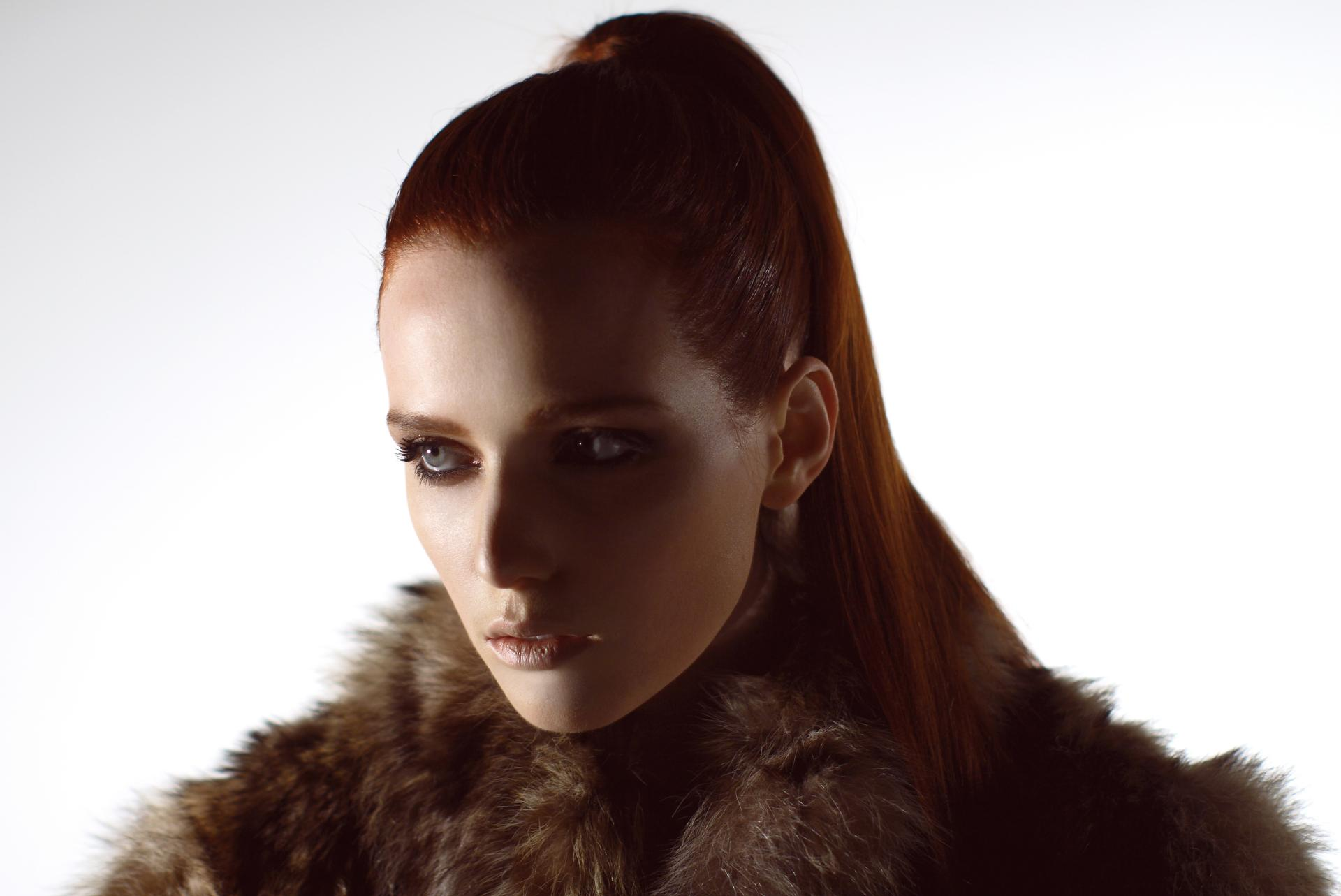
A photo of Alice Burdeu, from her Elite Model Management portfolio (2007)

After winning Australia's Next Top Model, Burdeu appeared in an ad campaign for Green With Envy, a fashion boutique in Melbourne, and on the cover of Pages, an Australian fashion magazine. She modeled for several months in Singapore, appearing on the covers of Luxury, and Luxx Living magazines. During her prize vacation to New York, Burdeu was signed by Elite Model Management, who helped her secure jobs in the Fall/Winter 2008 New York Fashion Week shows of designers including Proenza Schouler, Marchesa, and Marc Jacobs.

Burdeu has twice appeared on the cover of Vogue Australia, as well as in editorials for Women's Wear Daily, Velvet, Elle UK, Marie Claire Italy, AnOther and Numéro Korea. She has walked in runway shows for designers including Louis Vuitton, Alexander McQueen, Dolce & Gabbana, Marc Jacobs, Christian Lacroix, Jean-Charles de Castelbajac, Jil Sander, Lanvin, Céline, Lacoste, Shiatzy Chen, Sonia Rykiel and Alex Perry. Burdeu has also appeared in campaigns for D&G, Sonia Rykiel, Napoleon Perdis, Alannah Hill, Mimco and Blumarine.

In February 2008, Burdeu was featured in Models.com's Top 10 Newcomers of Fall 2008, and was touted to be one of the rising stars of the high-fashion world by Style.com.
In the latter half of 2008, Burdeu took time off from modeling, skipping the Fall/Winter 2009 fashion weeks altogether.

After having studied at the Royal Melbourne Institute of Technology, Burdeu began working as a model once again in 2010. During New Zealand Fashion Week, she made appearances in 19 shows. She was featured in the October issue of Fashion Trend magazine and modelled for Fleur Wood's 2010 winter campaign In 2011, Burdeu re-signed with Elite Model Management in New York and signed with Elite Model Management in Milan for the first time. Since this, Burdeu was featured in an editorial in Vogue Australia in February 2011, Tokion Factory in January 2011 and modelled for Country Road, Ellison, Juli Bala and Mindfood.

During Fashion Week Fall/Winter 2011, Burdeu walked for Chado Ralph Rucci, Honor, Naeem Khan and Timo Weiland at New York Fashion Week, Giles at London Fashion Week, Giorgio Armani, Emporio Armani, Piazza Sempione and closed for Philipp Plein at Milan Fashion Week. Manish Arora and Damir Doma at Paris Fashion Week. In 2013 she appeared in The Great Gatsby along with fellow model Gemma Ward as uncredited extras.

In October 2015, Burdeu was ranked by Cosmopolitan as one of the most successful contestants of the Top Model franchise.

== Personal life ==
Burdeu stated during Australia's Next Top Model that she would like to continue on with her education and attend university, however she has postponed plans for further education in order to pursue modeling.

In 2008, Burdeu took some time off to study Psychology at Melbourne's RMIT University. She returned to the runway in late 2010.

Achievements
Preceded by Eboni Stocks	Australia's Next Top Model winner Cycle 3 (2007)	Succeeded by Demelza Reveley
