= Jez Smith =

British fashion and beauty photographer

Jez Smith (born in Birmingham, United Kingdom) is a British fashion and beauty photographer, best known as a judge on the reality television programme Australia's Next Top Model.

== Career ==
=== Photography ===
Jez Smith is most famous for working with celebrities and fashion models such as Cate Blanchett, Jodhi Meares, Sarah Murdoch, Megan Gale, Jennifer Hawkins and Colin Friels.

He is also known for editorial and advertising clients such as Levis, Virgin Atlantic, George Jensen, Collette Dinnigan, Carla Zampatti, Alannah Hill, Oroton and Tiger Lily.

=== Television ===
Smith has appeared as a judge on Cycle 3 and Cycle 6 of Australia's Next Top Model. He also was featured as a guest photographer and judge on Cycle 5 where he shot 'natural beauty' photographs for the final three contestants; Tahnee Atkinson, Cassi Van Den Dungen and Clare Venema. In Episode 12, Smith was a guest judge on season 18 of America's Next Top Model. Also Smith was a guest photographer and judge on season 3 of Asia's Next Top Model in Episodes 8 and 9.
