= Adam Ferrier =

Australian psychologist

- Occupation: Psychologist

Adam Ferrier is an Australian psychologist, writer, creative strategist, and the founder of Thinkerbell.

== Education ==
Ferrier holds bachelors degree in Commerce and Arts (Psychology) from Murdoch University, a Postgraduate Diploma in Applied Psychology from Bond University and a Master of Psychology (clinical) from Western Sydney University. His masters thesis was on 'Identifying the underlying constructs of cool people' (Published on Figshare).

== Career ==
Ferrier started work for Corrective Services NSW as a psychologist, before joining marketing consultancy Added Value. He then left to work at Saatchi & Saatchi as a strategic planner.

Ferrier then co-founded Naked Communications, APAC. Naked embraced a media neutral behavioural change model to build brands. Naked was one of Australia's most successful agencies, and helped redefine the agency model. After selling Naked, Ferrier co-created Thinkerbell - where they practice 'measured magic' - bringing together marketing science and hard core creativity. Thinkerbell was named Mumbrella's Creative and PR and Full Service Agency of The Year. Thinkerbell now has approximately 200 people with offices in Sydney, Melbourne and Auckland.

=== Media career ===
Ferrier also co- hosts a podcast called Black T-Shirts: XXL Creativity for Business, and co-hosted Disrupt Radio's Enterprise Breakfast with Libbi Gore. He is a regular panelist on TV shows Gruen, The Project, Sunrise #mastersofspin, Celebrity Apprentice, Australia's Next Top Model, and Man Up. He had a weekly segment on national radio station MMM, and ABC, where he campaigned against the evils of smoking. He has commentated and/or written for TIME, The Australian, Mumbrella', B&T, Fast Company, The Guardian and the Wall Street Journal.

== Selected publications ==
Ferrier has published two books on marketing: The Advertising Effect: How to Change Behaviour (Oxford, 2014) and Stop Listening to the Customer: Try Hearing Your Brand Instead (Wiley, 2020). He has also contributed to other books and has created a best selling board game, subsequently translated into several languages called The Analyst ('It's like reading your best friends diary), published by After8 Games.

== Personal life ==
Ferrier is married to Anna, and has two children.
