= Sophie Van Den Akker =

Australian fashion model (born 1990)

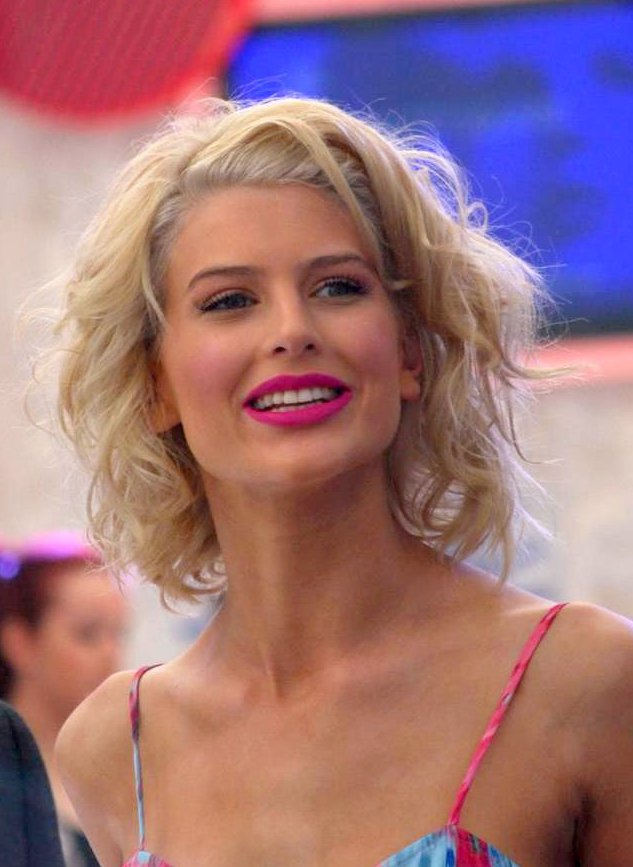
- Born: Sophie Van Den Akker; Melbourne, Victoria, Australia
- Modeling information
- Height: 176.5 cm (5 ft 9 1/2 in)
- Hair color: Blonde
- Eye color: Blue
- Agency: Chadwick Models; PMA Models (Hamburg); IMM Brussels(Brussels); Crystal Models (Paris); Monster Management (Milan); Two Management (Los Angeles)

Sophie Van Den Akker is an Australian fashion model. She became the last eliminated in the sixth cycle of the reality television show Australia's Next Top Model.

== Career ==
=== Australia's Next Top Model ===
Sophie entered the Top Model House along with 15 other girls. As the show progressed, she evolved from a commercial to a high fashion look, particularly the 'fur shoot' where she received best picture.

She was told by Doll Wright from Elite Model Management that she could work overseas. Until the last episode before the live finale, Kelsey and Sophie were on the bottom two and the judges could not decide who would join Amanda. Therefore, they decided to bring both girls until the end. Sophie became the last eliminated on the live finale.

=== Model ===
Sophie signed with Priscilla's Model Management in Sydney, Australia, but later moved with Chadwick Models in Melbourne & Sydney, Australia . She modeled for Avon and joined with Rachel Finch for the Speedo 2011 summer campaign.

Sophie appeared in an editorial for Faint Magazine Story UK, as well as a cover and editorial spread for Covet Magazine.

In March 2011, she walked at L'oreal Melbourne Fashion Festival 2011 and in July that year she was announced as the face of Melbourne Spring Fashion Week.

== Personal life ==
In June 2021, she married her longtime boyfriend Heath Decker in Yarra Valley. She has two children from a previous relationship.
