= Australia's Next Top Model =

Australian reality television series

- Created by: Tyra Banks
- Based on: America's Next Top Model by Tyra Banks
- Presented by: Erika Heynatz; Jodhi Meares; Sarah Murdoch; Jennifer Hawkins
- Judges: Alex Perry; Erika Heynatz; Ken Thompson; Marguerite Kramer; Georges Antoni; Victoria Fisher; Charlotte Dawson; Jez Smith; Jodhi Meares; Sarah Murdoch; Didier Cohen; Jennifer Hawkins; Megan Gale
- Opening theme: "Gonna Be On Top" by Tiaan Williams
- Country of origin: Australia
- Original language: English
- No. of seasons: 10
- No. of episodes: 107

Production
- Running time: 60 minutes
- Production companies: Granada Media Australia (2005–10); Shine Australia (2011–2016)

Original release
- Network: Fox8
- Release: 11 January 2005 – 22 November 2016

Australia's Next Top Model is an Australian reality television series which premiered on 11 January 2005 and concluded on 22 November 2016, and was based on Tyra Banks' America's Next Top Model. It was broadcast on the Australian subscription television channel, Fox8.

== Premise ==
The series featured a group of young female contestants who attended preliminary auditions across Australia with finalists selected to star in the series proper, where they ended up living together in a house for several weeks whilst taking part in lectures, challenges, photo shoots and meetings with members of the modelling industry. Normally, one contestant was eliminated each week until the last contestant remaining was declared "Australia's Next Top Model" and received a modelling contract and other associated prizes, usually a feature spread in an Australian fashion magazine, a cash prize, a new car and meetings with modelling agencies with the intention of securing future work.

== Show format ==
Each episode of Top Model covered the events of roughly a week of real time (however, while overseas, an episode might cover a shorter period), and featured a fashion challenge, a photo shoot and/or commercial, a critique of each contestant and her performance by the judging panel, and the elimination of one or more contestants.

=== Judges ===
Judges

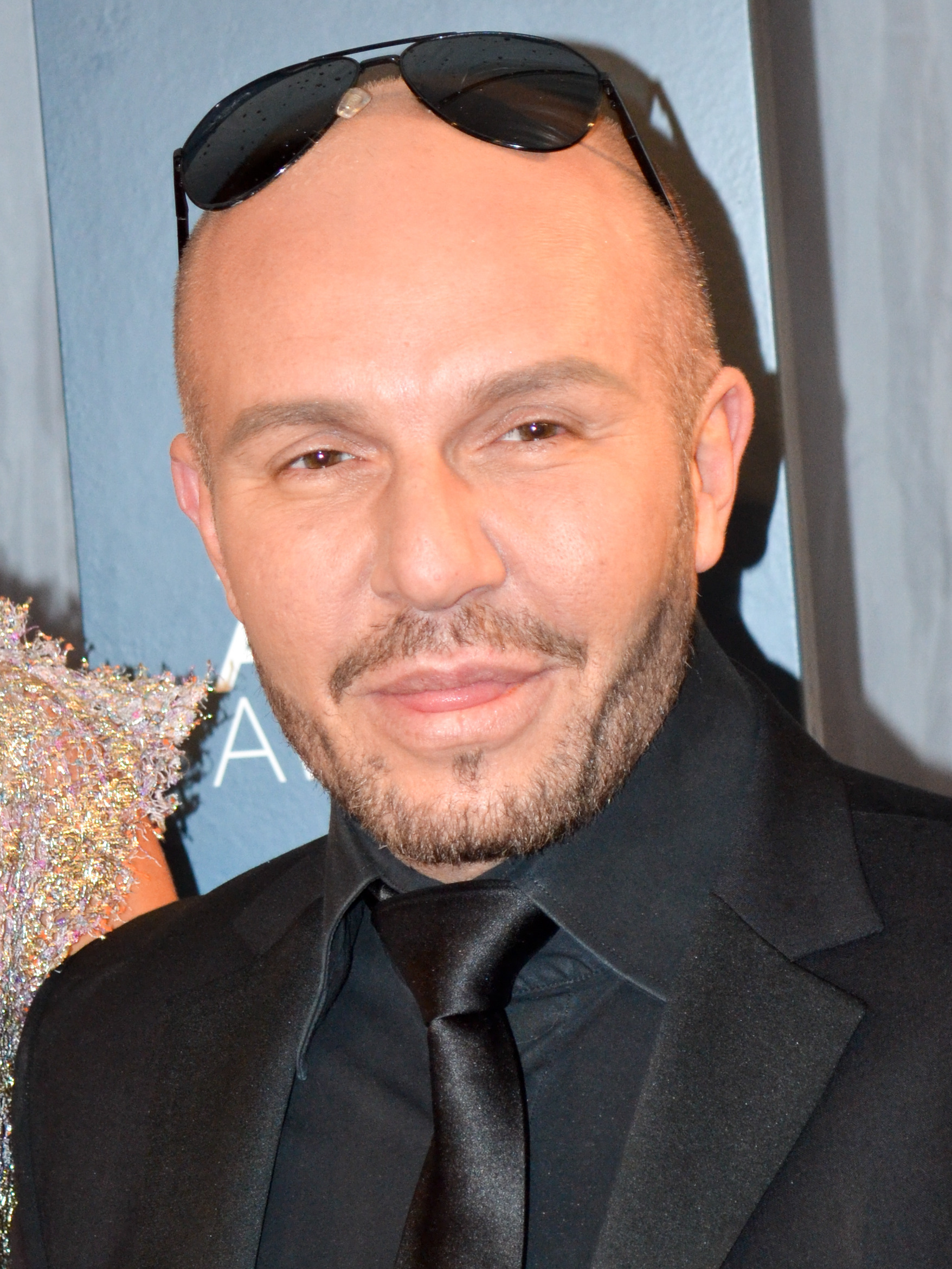
Alex Perry

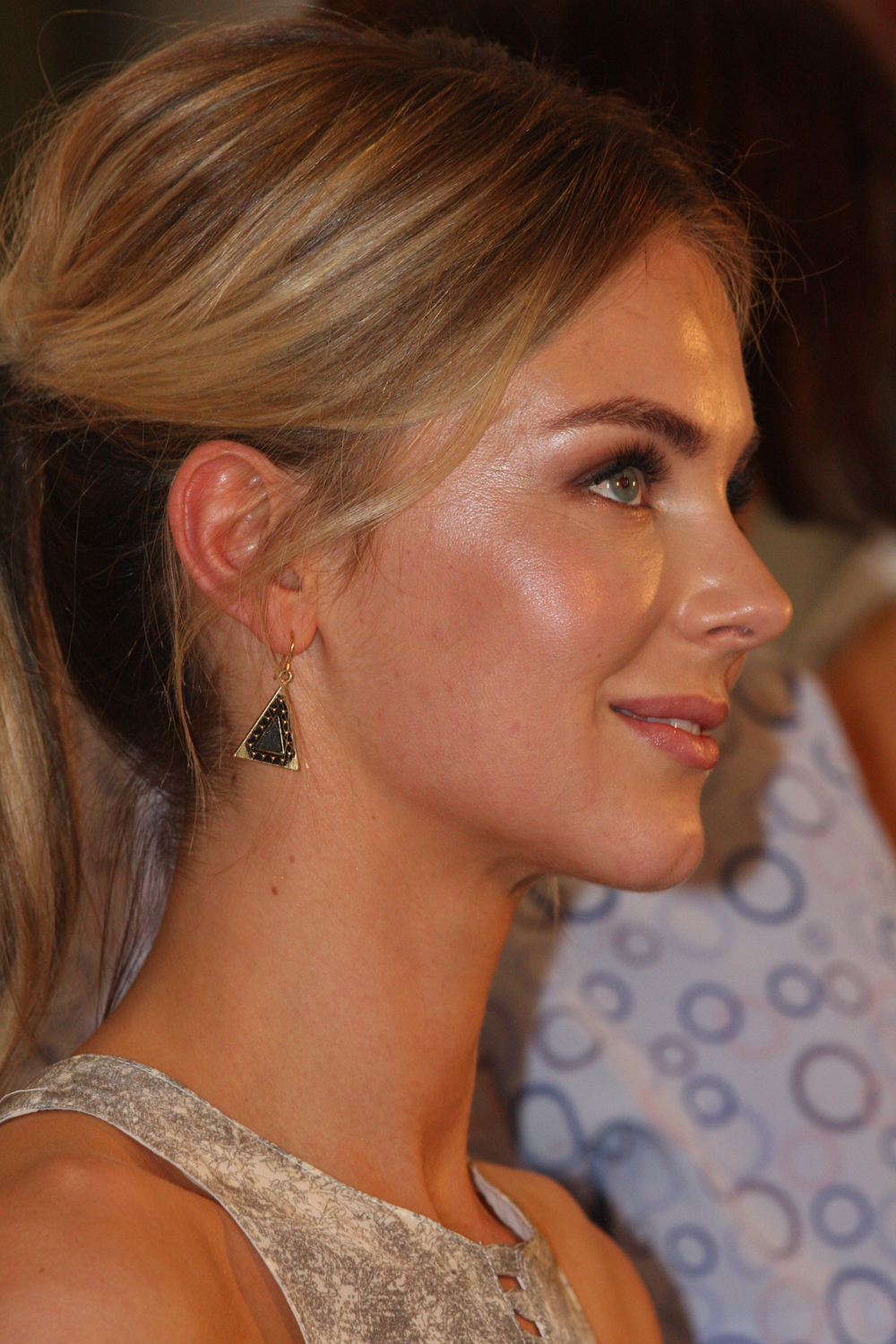
Jennifer Hawkins

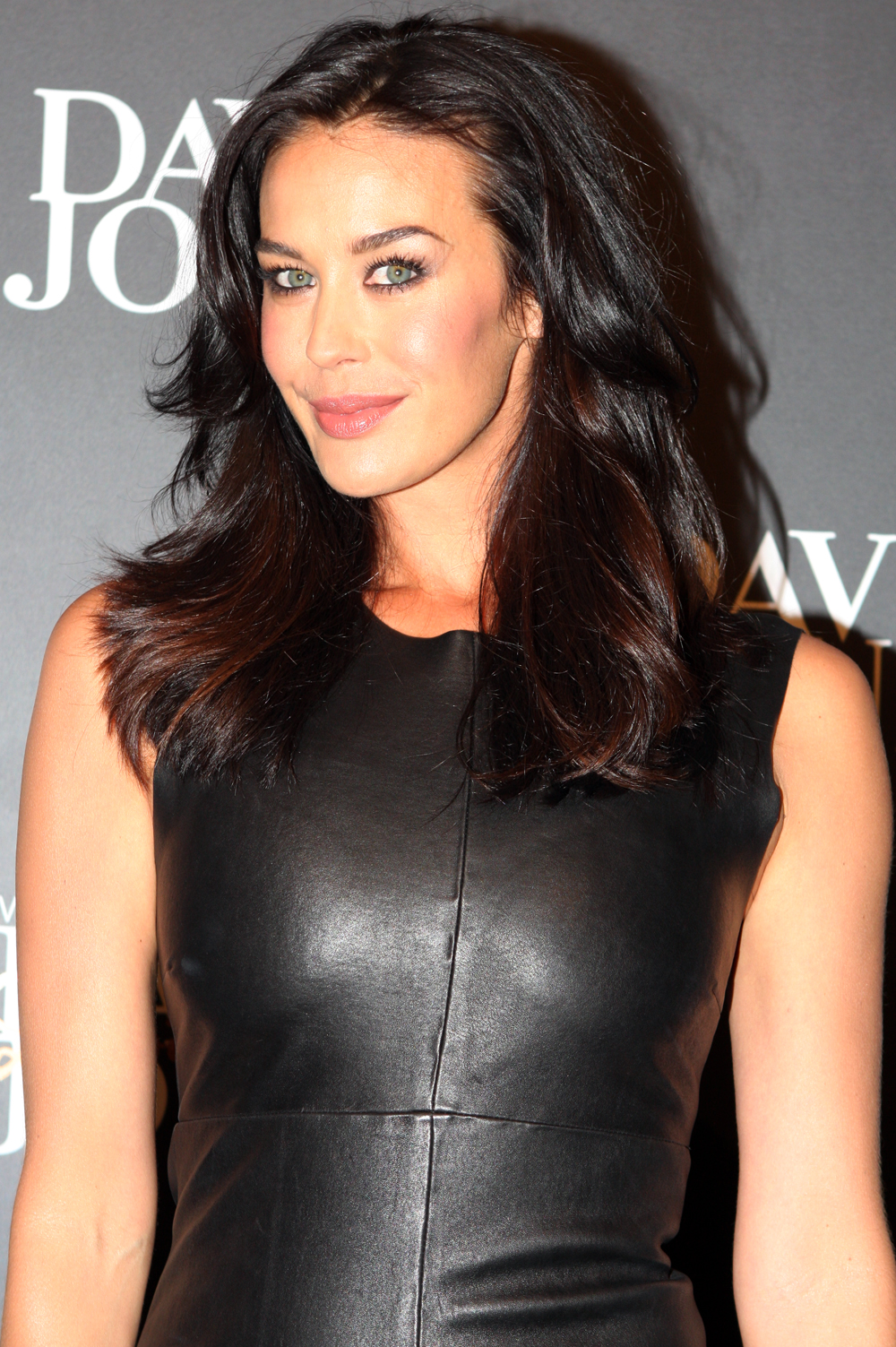
Megan Gale

In the eighth season Jennifer Hawkins became the host of the series. Fashion designer Alex Perry is also currently a judge. Previous judges have included model Erika Heynatz, former Harper's Bazaar managing editor Marguerite Kramer, fashion stylist Ken Thompson, fashion producer Victoria Fisher, fashion photographer Georges Antoni, model-turned-designer Jodhi Meares, model-actress Sarah Murdoch, TV personality Charlotte Dawson and fashion photographer Jez Smith. In season 10, Megan Gale joined the panel. Usually there is an additional guest judge every week. There was a position of model mentor who was not a permanent judge but appeared in almost every episode of the season. In season 9 Didier Cohen and Cheyenne Tozzi served as mentors.

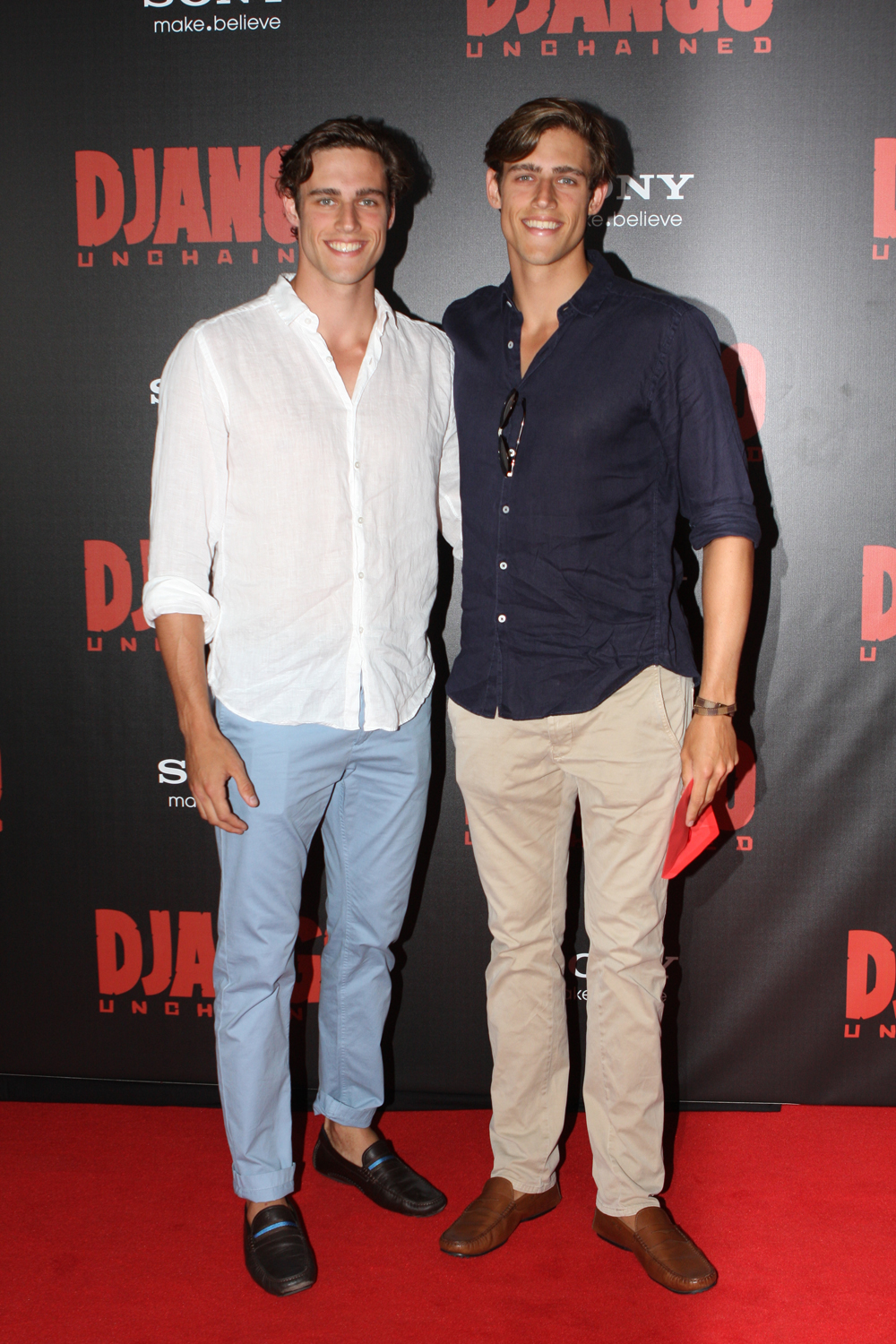
Jordan and Zac Stenmark

Judge/Mentor	Seasons									
Judge/Mentor	1 (2005)	2 (2006)	3 (2007)	4 (2008)	5 (2009)	6 (2010)	7 (2011)	8 (2013)	9 (2015)	10 (2016)
Hosts
Erika Heynatz	Main	Main								
Jodhi Meares		Guest	Main	Main						
Sarah Murdoch					Main	Main	Main			
Jennifer Hawkins	Guest							Main	Main	Main
Judging Panelists
Alex Perry	Main	Main	Main	Main	Main	Main	Main	Main	Main	Main
Marguerite Kramer	Main									
Ken Thompson	Main									
Georges Antoni		Main	Guest	Guest	Guest	Guest	Guest	Guest	Guest	Guest
Victoria Fisher		Main								
Charlotte Dawson			Main	Main	Main	Main	Main	Main		
Jez Smith			Main		Guest	Main	Guest	Guest		Guest
Jonathan Pease		Guest	Mentor	Mentor	Mentor					
Josh Flinn						Mentor	Mentor			
Didier Cohen								Main	Mentor	
Cheyenne Tozzi						Guest			Mentor	Mentor
Megan Gale				Guest		Guest	Guest		Guest	Main
Jordan Stenmark								Guest		Mentor
Zac Stenmark								Guest		Mentor

=== Requirements ===
In the first two series, contestants had to be at least 18 years old. However, the show lowered the minimum age limit from 18 to 16 starting from season 3 after realizing that most international models started their career earlier. Starting from season 3, contestants must be aged between 16 and 23 at the time of filming. Those auditioning had to be at least 172 cm (5 ft 8 in) tall. In the past, some contestants had weighed less than 60 kg, but there was no restriction on weight.

=== Differences between ANTM and AusNTM ===
Australia's Next Top Model shared the format of its American counterpart, but there were a few differences. On America's Next Top Model the final two models compete in a runway fashion show and the winner is chosen in the judging room. Starting from season 3, the final two contestants competed in front of a live studio audience in Sydney before the winner was revealed live-to-air. The judges, sponsors, and fashion professionals voted for the winner, along with the TV viewing public, whose votes contributed 15 per cent to the overall tally. Beginning with season 6, the format was changed. The final three (not two) were interviewed, shown their best bits from the competition, and participated in a runway show. The viewer votes decided the winner of the competition. From season 9 and onward, the show returned to pre-recorded finals.

== Cycles ==
Cycle	Premiere date	Winner	Runner-up	Other contestants in order of elimination	Number of contestants	International Destinations
1	11 January 2005	Gemma Sanderson	Chloe Wilson	Naomi Thompson, Nicole Fraser, Atong Tulba Mulual, Allana Ridge (quit), Zoe McDonald, Simmone Duckmanton, Sam Morley, Shannon McGuire	10	None
2	4 January 2006	Eboni Stocks	Jessica French	Sasha Greenoff, Rebecca Pian & Natalie Giuffre, Sophie Miller, Sarah Lawrence, Hiranthi Warusevitane, Caroline Mouflard (quit), Lara Cameron, Louise Van Brussel, Madeleine Rose, Simone Viljoen	13	None
3	27 March 2007	Alice Burdeu	Steph Hart	Jaimi Smith (quit), Cobi Marsh, Cassandra Hughes, Kara Taylor, Steph Flockhart, Jane Williamson, Sophie Wittingslow, Danica Brown, Paloma Rodriguez, Anika Salerno, Jordan Loukas	13	Los Angeles
4	22 April 2008	Demelza Reveley	Alexandra Girdwood	Kamila Markowska, Kristy Coulcher, Emma O'Sullivan, Belinda Hodge, Alamela Rowan, Leiden Kronemberger & Jamie Lee, Rebecca Jobson, Alyce Crawford, Caris Eves, Samantha Downie	13	Nadi; New York City
5	28 April 2009	Tahnee Atkinson	Cassi Van Den Dungen	Laura Tyrie, Leah Johnsen, Georgie Kidman, Mikarla Hussey & Eloise Hoile, Madison Wall, Laura Mitchell, Lola Van Vorst, Franky Okpara, Adele Thiel, Clare Venema	13	London
6	20 July 2010	Amanda Ware	Kelsey Martinovich	Alison Boxer & Valeria Nilova & Ashlea Monigatti & Sally Geach & Claire Smith, Megan Jacob, Ashton Flutey, Chantal Croccolo, Kimberly Thrupp, Brittney Dudley, Joanna Broomfield, Kathryn Lyons, Jessica Moloney, Sophie Van Den Akker	16	Tokyo
7	8 August 2011	Montana Cox	Liz Braithwaite	Cassy Phillips-Sainsbury, Tayah Lee-Traub, Annaliese McCann & Alissandra Moone, Neo Yakuac & Caroline Austin, Yolanda Hodgson, Jess Bush & Amelia Coutts, Madeline Huett, Izzy Vesey & Hazel O'Connell, Rachel Riddell, Simone Holtznagel	16	Paris; Dubai
8	9 July 2013	Melissa Juratowitch	Shanali Martin	Chanique Greyling, Taylor Henley, Rhiannon Bradshaw, Brooke Hogan & April Harvey, Taylah Roberts (disqualified), Madeline Cowe, Ashley Pogmore, Shannon Richardson, Jade Collins & Dajana Bogojevic, Abbie Weir, Duckie Thot	15	Bangkok; Port Louis
9	30 April 2015	Brittany Beattie	Lucy Markovic	Kaitlyn Bennett, Cassie Hargrave, Ayieda Malou, Phoebe Deskovic, Zahra Thalari, Tanahya Cohen, Izi Simundic, Jordan Burridge, Lauren Ericson, Jess Thomas, Alex Sinadinovic	13	New York City
10	20 September 2016	Aleyna FitzGerald	Sabine Jamieson	Sofie Baric, Laura Taaffe, Summer Kane, Jordan Simek, Jessie Andrewartha, Christy Baker, Vitoria Triboni, Belinda Kosorok, Kassidy Ure, Linnea Stevens-Jones, Daisy Davies	13	Milan

== Controversy ==
Following a breach of contract with Heynatz's appearance on the Channel Seven series It Takes Two, she was replaced as host by Jodhi Meares, who was consistently scrutinized for her lack of involvement in the show. During the season 3 live finale, she made a number of embarrassing blunders that drew commentary from critics on her ability to host. Things worsened when she pulled out of her hosting duties hours before the season 4 live finale. The swarm of negative comments from the press and fans of the show led to Meares' withdrawal from the programme.

In season 4, Demelza Reveley's win provoked negative feedback from critics and the public due to her bullying of Alamela Rowan during the fourth episode. During the finale, Vogue Australia's editor-in-chief, Kirstie Clements, and judge Charlotte Dawson voted in favor of fellow contestant Alexandra Girdwood because of Reveley's behaviour. The judges' scores were tied, so the decision came down to the public, who voted for Reveley.

After season 5, runner-up Cassi Van Den Dungen made a series of highly controversial comments. She was offered modeling contracts by Priscilla's Model Management in Australia and Elite Model Management in New York City. Cassi turned down both offers and quit modeling in order to remain in Sunbury with her boyfriend, Brad Saul, causing a backlash from the public, as well as from judges Alex Perry and Charlotte Dawson, who had vouched for Cassi on the show and urged her to pursue modeling. Cassi later stated in the press that she rejected the Elite contract because she didn't want to be pressured to drop from a size six to a four.

In the season 6 live final, the TV viewers voted to decide the winner. Initially, Sarah Murdoch announced Kelsey Martinovich as the winner of Australia's Next Top Model. Moments after Martinovich had made her victory speech, Murdoch stopped the celebrations and announced that Amanda Ware was the winner of season 6. An embarrassed Murdoch apologised repeatedly to Martinovich and the audience, stating that the final result was fed to her wrong. As compensation for the error, Foxtel awarded Martinovich a A$25,000 cash prize and an all-expenses paid trip to New York. Harper's Bazaar decided to release both Ware and Martinovich's covers for the November issue. In the days following the bungled announcement, top industry commentators expressed scepticism about whether the episode was a publicity stunt, with the editor of Harper's Bazaar Edwina McCann accusing Foxtel of manipulating the result. "The network did want Amanda to win ... They kept the voting lines open for a long time I think in the hope that she would get over the line. I'm told that it came down to three votes," she told the Nine Network.

In episode 6 of season 8, Taylah Roberts choked Ashley Pogmore after a painting challenge. Roberts was confronted by host Jennifer Hawkins at panel and she was ultimately disqualified from the competition. Before the footage was aired on television, the incident had been covered by several media outlets. It was also noted that while the disqualification might have been the proper course of action, it was still incorrect to showcase the occurrence as a selling point to draw in more viewers for the show.

== See also ==
- List of Australian television series
- Top Model series
