= Demelza Reveley =

Australian model (born 1991)

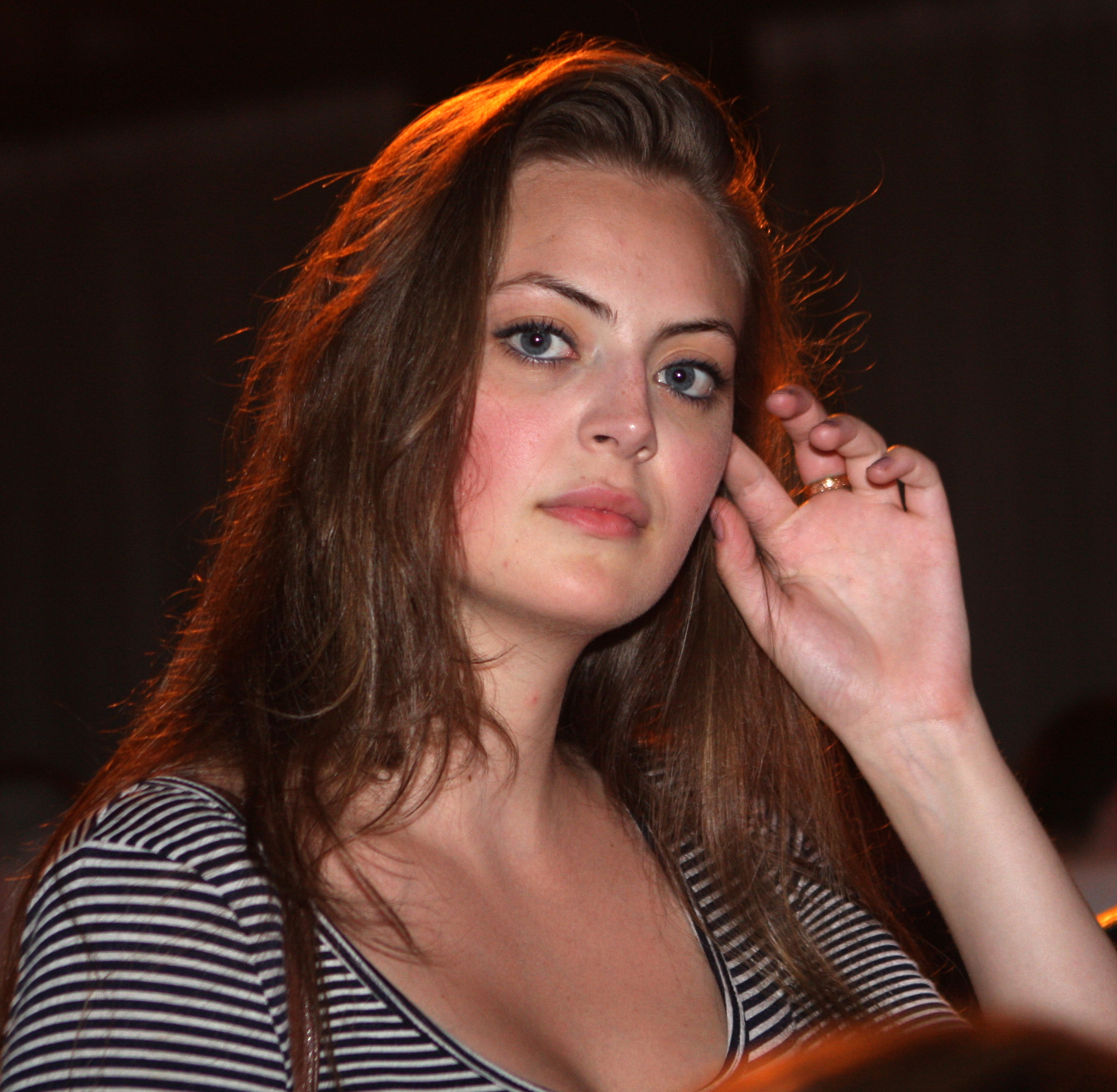
- Reveley in February 2011
- Born: 19 September 1991 (age 35); Wollongong, New South Wales, Australia
- Modeling information
- Height: 5 ft 11 in (1.80 m)
- Hair color: Brown
- Eye color: Blue
- Agency: Priscilla's Model Management

Demelza Rose Reveley (born 19 September 1991) is an Australian model, who won the fourth cycle of Australia's Next Top Model.

== Early life ==
Reveley was born in Wollongong, New South Wales, to Andrew and Margaret Reveley. She has one sister, Tanith. Prior to competing on Australia's Next Top Model, she was a student at St Mary Star of the Sea College and Illawarra Grammar School.

== Australia's Next Top Model ==
She was crowned Australia's Next Top Model in the last episode against fellow contestant and finalist, Alexandra Girdwood by last season's winner, Alice Burdeu. Her prize is representation with Priscilla's Model Management for 12 months, a Ford Fiesta Zetec, a contract as the face of Napoleon Perdis cosmetics, an all expenses paid trip to New York City to meet top international agencies, and an eight-page spread with Vogue Australia.

Despite winning the competition, Vogue editor, Kirstie Clements stated that Demelza is not ready to appear on the cover of Vogue and Australia's Next Top Model judge, Charlotte Dawson, agreed. Dawson said that "Alice [Burdeu] was ready to rock... she was very sophisticated and worldly; Demelza is not, she's a pretty young girl."

=== Career ===
Demelza appeared in the September 2008 issue of Vogue Australia as part of her prize. She will also be the spokesperson for Napoleon Perdis cosmetics. Demelza has walked for 3 designers 2009 Spring/Summer fashion shows in Australian Fashion Week in Sydney. She is currently signed to Priscilla's Model Management in Australia. Demelza Reveley recently landed a campaign for chocolate giant Ferrero Rocher and her manager Priscilla Leighton Clarke said her trip to New York was a success.

She is currently the face of Sydney's Strand Arcade, posing as Alice in Wonderland. She appeared in Cosmopolitan magazine.

Preceded by Alice Burdeu	Australia's Next Top Model winner Cycle 4 (2008)	Succeeded by Tahnee Atkinson
