= Charlotte Dawson =

New Zealand–Australian television personality (1966-2014)

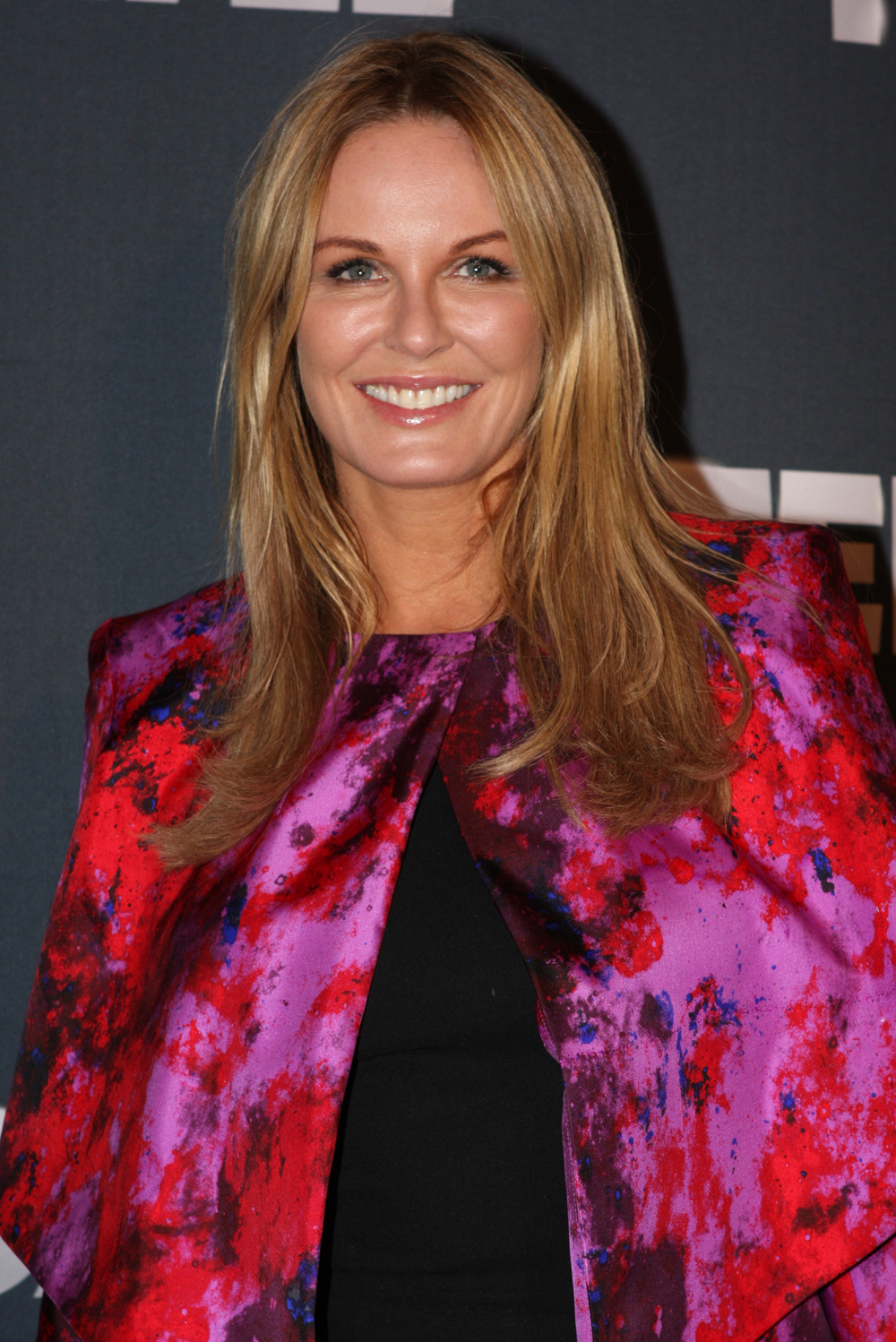
- Dawson in February 2013
- Born: 8 April 1966; Auckland, New Zealand
- Died: 22 February 2014 (aged 47); Woolloomooloo, New South Wales, Australia
- Cause of death: suicide
- Body discovered: Woolloomooloo, New South Wales, Australia
- Citizenship: Australia, New Zealand (dual)
- Occupations: Television personality and former model
- Years active: 1982–2014
- Spouse: Scott Miller (m. 1999–2000)
- Relatives: Emily Barclay (niece)

Charlotte Dawson (8 April 1966 – 22 February 2014) was a New Zealand–Australian television personality. She was known in New Zealand for her roles as host of Getaway, and in Australia as a host on The Contender Australia and as a judge on Australia's Next Top Model. In 2014, her death by suicide attracted Australasian-wide news coverage.

== Careers ==
Dawson grew up in Auckland, after being adopted at birth. She dropped out of high school at age 16 to model in Europe and with Ford Models in New York City. A decade later she relocated to Australia where she became a familiar face on the Australian fashion scene.

In 1997, she became beauty and fashion director for Woman's Day and soon after became style editor for New Idea magazine. In 2000, she was the face of the Peter Morrissey fashion label, presenting her own fashion segment weekly on Good Morning Australia for Network Ten, and featuring in the fashion section of Sydney's Olympic Games opening ceremony. She was the fashion correspondent for Channel Ten's entertainment programme E! News and also a regular panelist on the network's daytime show Beauty and the Beast, and guest on Burke's Backyard and Channel Nine's Simply The Best.

While working for Australian agencies Cameron's and Priscilla's as an agent, she decided to try her hand at TV. She became a researcher at Nine Network and worked on programs such as Money and Looking Good. Shortly after, she became fashion editor for the network's Today program, filing weekly reports on local and international fashion news and events within the industry. Magazines such as Vogue, Elle, She, Dolly, Cleo and Mode tracked Dawson's progress, featuring her in fashion spreads.

She had many appearances as a "celebrity model" at fashion shows and was a guest fashion commentator for Nine's Wide World of Sports; she also made regular appearances on The Footy Show, and had several hosting and MC jobs at media events.

Dawson returned to Auckland in 2002 where she had presenting roles on TVNZ's chat show How's Life?, and Prime's Getaway and Charlotte's Lists.

She then returned to Australia, where she was a judge (and sometimes mentor to the models during challenges) on FOX8's Australia's Next Top Model from Season 3 in 2007 to Season 8 in 2013. In 2008, she filled in for regular host Jodhi Meares for the live finale. Dawson also hosted the Foxtel series Runway to L.A.

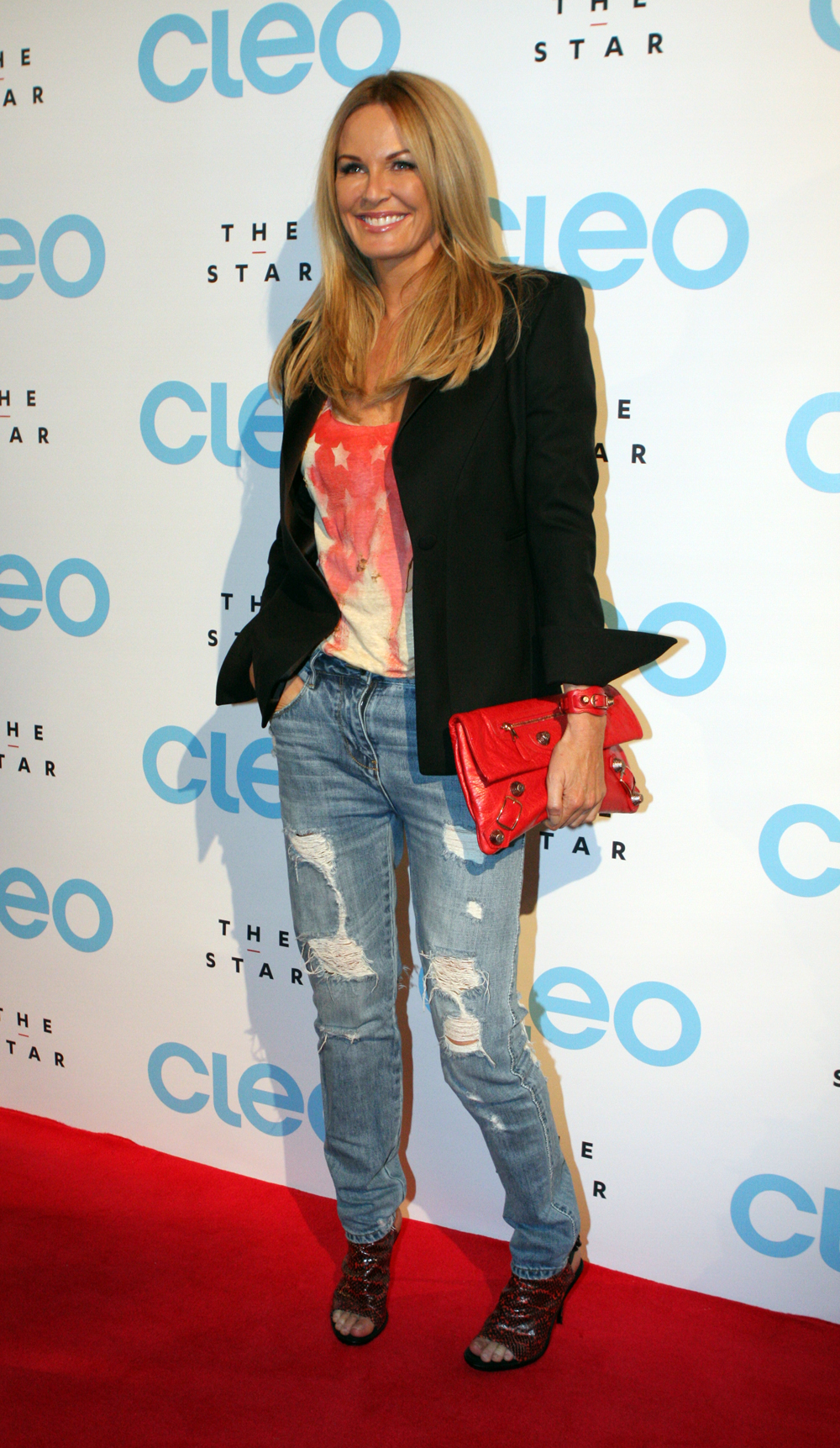
Dawson in April 2013

In 2012 she appeared as one of the 'celebrity' contestants, raising money for her chosen charity, on the second season of The Celebrity Apprentice Australia. August 2012 saw a new period of media unrest for Dawson, following an interview with New Zealand's Herald on Sunday about her thoughts on her former home. "New Zealand is small, nasty and vindictive. It's a tiny, little village ... a tiny country at the end of the earth," she said'.

== Personal life ==
Dawson was married to Australian Olympic swimmer Scott Miller from 1999 to 2000.

Charlotte expressed regrets about having an abortion revealing it deepened her depression.

== Anti-cyberbullying ==
In 2012, Dawson was admitted to St Vincent's Hospital in Sydney after attempting suicide due to a much publicised battle with Twitter trolls. Dawson was rushed to hospital after being found in a fragile state by a former Australia's Next Top Model finalist. Dawson was made the target of an organised online campaign of harassment in part due to her involvement with an anti-cyberbullying initiative Community Brave. A representative for Community Brave identified one of Dawson's Twitter trolls as Tanya Heti, an employee of Melbourne's Monash University. Community Brave reported the incident to Heti's employer and she was stood down without pay. She was reinstated shortly afterwards when the university found she was not guilty of misconduct.

Dawson then appeared on Channel Seven's Seven News in order to expose the alleged social media trolls. Dawson insisted that she was not involved with conducting the research for the story, and that she was only acting as a person confronting the alleged trolls on camera. An intense promotional campaign and launch of Dawson's biography Air Kiss and Tell began two weeks later.

In 2013, Dawson announced a new role as anti-bullying ambassador with the National Rugby League (NRL). Some media sources, such as the Daily Telegraph, suggested that Dawson was guilty of double standards, citing her aggressive television persona and her history of discouraging contestants on Australia's Next Top Model. Peter Ford from Melbourne's 3AW alleged that "the problem of Charlotte taking on this cause is, her act is about abusing people and putting them down so it becomes a bit murky as to why she has become a champion of this particular cause". Dawson was also heavily criticised in the media after broadcasting disparaging remarks on AFL footballers' partners as a part of her role as a fashion expert for television coverage of the AFL's Brownlow Medal.

== Death ==
On 22 February 2014, Dawson died by suicide in her Woolloomooloo home. A real estate agent found her body when he arrived to inspect the property ahead of its auction. Police were called and confirmed her death at 11:18 am. Her friends were reportedly concerned when she had not updated her Twitter or Instagram accounts in the previous 19 hours.

Australian fashion designer Alex Perry said of her, "We lost a beautiful, bright, shining girl today".
