= Alex Perry =

Australian fashion designer (born 1963)

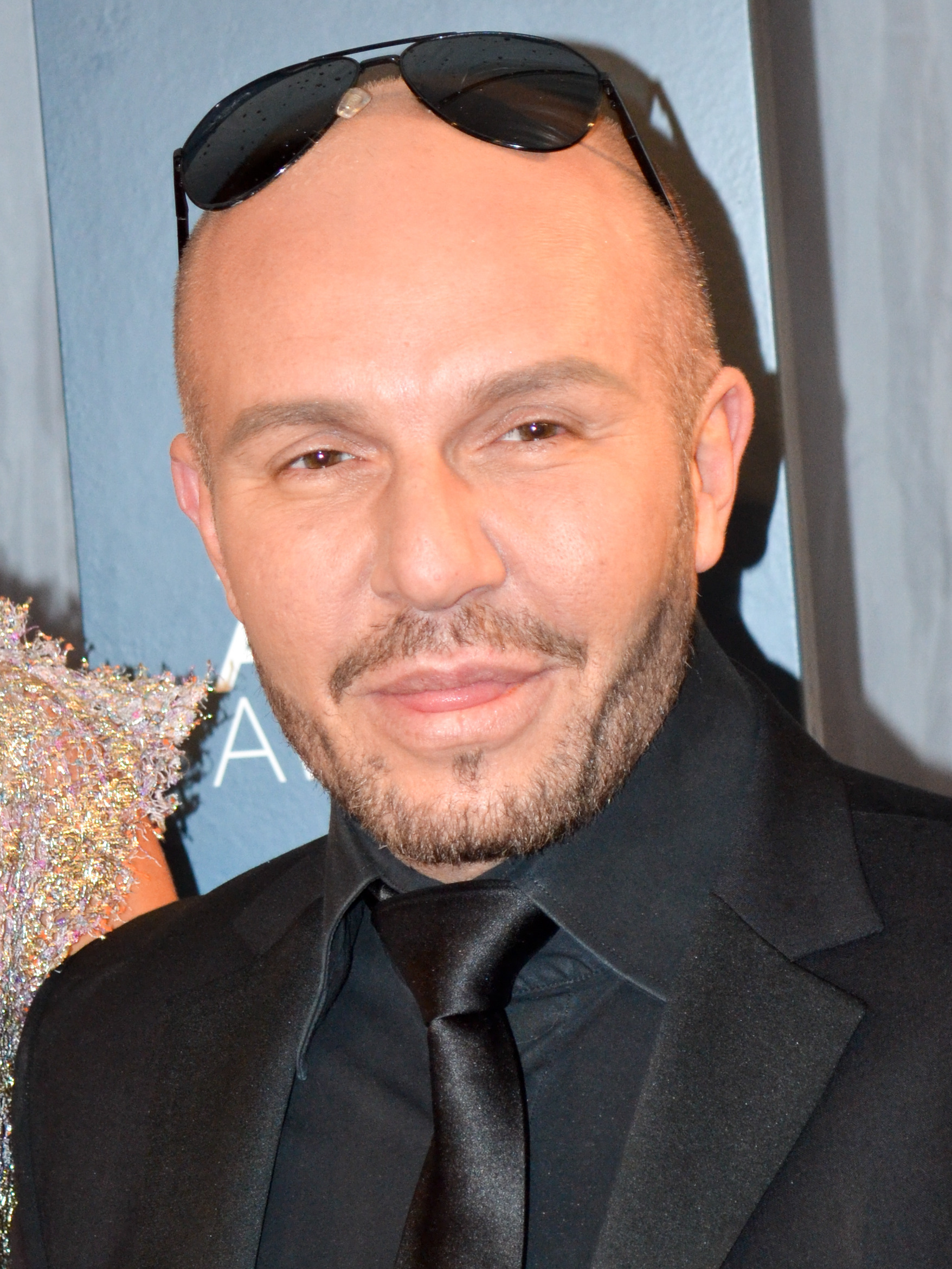
- Born: Alexandros Pertsinidis; 14 February 1963 (age 63); Matraville Sydney, Australia
- Occupations: Fashion designer, television personality
- Years active: 1984–present
- Spouse: Mary Perry
- Website: www.alexperry.com.au

Alexandros Pertsinidis (born on 14 February 1963), known professionally as Alex Perry, is an Australian fashion designer and television presenter, mostly famous for his womenswear. His designs have been worn by celebrities including Jennifer Lopez, Kim Kardashian, Gigi Hadid, Sandra Bullock, Gwyneth Paltrow, Rihanna, Priyanka Chopra, and Lupita Nyong'o.

Perry's designs have been featured on front covers of magazines such as Vogue Australia, Harper's Bazaar Australia, Marie Claire, InStyle, and Good Weekend.

Perry is the longest serving cast member of Australia's Next Top Model, having appeared as a judge for all ten seasons. He has also been a judge on Asia's Next Top Model and hosted The Real Housewives of Melbourne Reunion.

== Early life ==
Perry was born as Alexandros Pertsinidis and grew up in a migrant, working-class family in Sydney. He grew up in Matraville. His father is a Greek immigrant and his mother was born in Australia of Greek immigrant parents, though he anglicized his name to Alex Perry. He has an older brother named Lee.

== Career ==
In 1992, Perry launched his brand from a studio in suburban Kensington, creating gowns, corsets and sheaths. Perry's gowns were quickly acclaimed. Vogue Australia was the first to feature his sheaths and jeweled corsets in their main fashion shoot. This was Alex's first editorial shoot, and the gowns photographed became his signature style afterwards. Since that time, Alex Perry gowns have been featured repeatedly on the covers of Vogue, Harpers Bazaar, Marie Claire, InStyle Australia, Madison, and Grazia Australia.

Perry relocated his studio in 1994 to Double Bay, Sydney, where he built up his clientele to include high-profile celebrities, social identities and personalities. He was a designer at the inaugural Mercedes Australian Fashion Week held in May 1995, and has shown collections each year. Perry's runway shows have featured models such as Charlotte Dawson, Linda Evangelista, Alessandra Ambrosio, Megan Gale, Miranda Kerr, Alyssa Sutherland, Nicole Trunfio, and Lily Cole.

In May 2002, Perry opened his Sydney boutique at The Strand Arcade. The Alex Perry "ready-to-wear" collection represented a new generation of evening wear which launched globally in 2013. Perry is known for his gowns, which have appeared on the red carpet. Perry's statement dresses, often with intricate details, have led to an ever-increasing local and international client list.

International models Elle Macpherson, Linda Evangelista, and Claudia Schiffer have donned his designer ball gowns and red carpet evening wear.

== Media ==
Alex Perry has appeared as a fashion commentator or co-host on such television programs as 50 Years of Television – Red Carpet Reportage (Seven Network), Melbourne Cup Fashions on the Field (Seven Network), the Australian Fashion Awards (Nine Network), Ultimate Make Over (Seven Network), and also provided the commentary for Prince Charles and Camilla's wedding. During its run, he was a regular guest on Mornings with Kerri-Anne on the Nine Network and still makes appearances on other morning television shows.

Perry is the only judge to appear in all ten series of the reality television series Australia's Next Top Model, which premiered in 2005. He was originally cast by the show's producer Josie Mason Campbell after she saw his performances on Mornings with Kerri-Anne.

He appeared as a contestant in Celebrity MasterChef Australia in 2009, and Talkin' 'Bout Your Generation in 2010.

In July 2011, Perry took over as mentor on Season 3 of Project Runway Australia.

In May 2014, Perry hosted the two-part reunion special of The Real Housewives of Melbourne.

In December 2014, STAR World Asia announced that Perry will be a part of the judging panel as a creative director of Asia's Next Top Model (cycle 3).

In September 2015, the Alex Perry Hotel & Apartments opened in Brisbane's Fortitude Valley.
