= Australia's Next Top Model season 10 =

Australia's Next Top Model
- Season 10
- Judges: Jennifer Hawkins; Alex Perry; Megan Gale
- No. of contestants: 13
- Winner: Aleyna FitzGerald
- No. of episodes: 10

Release
- Original network: Fox8
- Original release: 20 September – 22 November 2016

Season chronology
- ← Previous; Season 9

The tenth and final season of Australia's Next Top Model began airing on 20 September 2016 on Fox8. Head judge and host Jennifer Hawkins and judge Alex Perry returned along with model mentor Cheyenne Tozzi. Tozzi's co-mentor and former judge Didier Cohen left the show after season 9, and was replaced by the Stenmark twins, models Jordan and Zac Stenmark, as her new co-mentors. Model Megan Gale joined the judging panel as a permanent judge.

The prizes for this season included a one-year modelling contract with Priscilla's Model Management in Sydney, a trip to New York City for New York Fashion Week valued at A$20,000 thanks to Colgate Optic White, a brand new Mazda2 Hatch, and an editorial spread in Elle Australia.

The winner of the competition was 16-year-old Aleyna FitzGerald from Newcastle.

== Series summary ==
=== Requirements ===
All applicants were required to be aged 16 and over on 1 January 2016 to be on the show. Those auditioning had to be at least 170 cm (5 ft 7 in) tall. To qualify, all applicants had to be an Australian citizen currently living in Australia. Additional requirements stated that a contestant could not have had previous experience as a model in a national campaign within the last five years.

=== Auditions ===
Auditions were held in Gold Coast on September 23, in Sydney on September 25–26, in Melbourne on 30 September and 1 October, in Hobart on October 3 and in Perth in October 9. Applicants from Darwin, Dubbo, Port Macquarie and Townsville were also invited to auditions. Applicants were also encouraged to apply for the competition online if they were unable to make an appearance at the live auditions.

=== Guest judges ===
To celebrate the series' ten year anniversary, the show decided to invite several well-known Australian models as guests for the new season. These included Elle Macpherson, Gemma Ward, and Miranda Kerr. The show also invited back several contestants from seasons past for guest appearances. Among these were season 7 winner Montana Cox and 2nd runner-up Simone Holtznagel, season 6 winner Amanda Ware, and season 5 runner-up Cassi Van Den Dungen. The series finale culminated with a runway show that invited several other alumni from multiple seasons of the show.

== Cast ==
=== Contestants ===
(Ages stated are at start of contest)

Contestant	Age	Height	Hometown	Finish	Place
Sofie Baric	17	177 cm (5 ft 9 1/2 in)	Hobart	Episode 1	13
Laura Taaffe	20	175 cm (5 ft 9 in)	Perth	Episode 2	12
Summer Kane	19	177 cm (5 ft 9 1/2 in)	Melbourne	Episode 3	11
Jordan Simek	20	178 cm (5 ft 10 in)	Sydney	Episode 4	10
Jessie Andrewartha	21	183.5 cm (6 ft 0 in)	Adelaide	Episode 5	9
Christy Baker	17	172 cm (5 ft 7 1/2 in)	Brisbane	Episode 6	8
Vitoria Triboni	25	177 cm (5 ft 9 1/2 in)	Sydney	Episode 6	7
Belinda Kosorok	18	175 cm (5 ft 9 in)	Wagga Wagga	Episode 7	6
Kassidy Ure	19	176 cm (5 ft 9 1/2 in)	Newcastle	Episode 8	5
Linnea Stevens-Jones	16	176 cm (5 ft 9 1/2 in)	Sydney	Episode 9	4
Daisy Davies	19	177 cm (5 ft 9 1/2 in)	Sydney	Episode 9	3
Sabine Jamieson	17	173 cm (5 ft 8 in)	Byron Bay	Episode 10	2
Aleyna FitzGerald	16	179 cm (5 ft 10 1/2 in)	Newcastle	Episode 10	1

=== Judges ===
- Jennifer Hawkins (host)
- Alex Perry
- Megan Gale

=== Other cast members ===
- Cheyenne Tozzi - mentor
- Jordan Stenmark - mentor
- Zac Stenmark - mentor

== Episodes ==
No. overall	No. in season	Title	Original release date
98	1	"Episode 1"	20 September 2016
The top thirteen contestants took part in their first runway challenge in front of a crowd of 400 people, and had to model designs from Alex Perry's S/S16 collection. They later had a night time photo shoot at The Star, facing off against season 7 winner Montana Cox.: Special guests: Montana Cox; Featured photographer: Georges Antoni
99	2	"Episode 2"	27 September 2016
The top twelve contestants competed in groups for a challenge in which they had to create a social media video for Colgate Optic White, with the best performer being chosen as an ambassador for the brand. The contestants later arrived at Randwick Racecourse, where they were introduced to Australian model Elle Macpherson, and took part in an equestrian inspired photo shoot with a racehorse.: Special guests: Tina Kim, Elle Macpherson; Featured photographer: Gary Heery
100	3	"Episode 3"	4 October 2016
The top eleven contestants were challenged to walk in a presentation for Swarovski as a part of Mercedes-Benz Fashion Week to win the opportunity of being featured in the brands upcoming Crystaldust campaign, and were later coached by former Australia's Next Top Model contestants Amanda Ware, Cassi Van Den Dungen, and Simone Holtznagel in preparation for a latex photo shoot in groups photographed by Jez Smith.: Special guests: Margaret Simonovska, Amanda Ware, Cassi Van Den Dungen, Simone Holtznagel; Featured photographer: Jez Smith
101	4	"Episode 4"	11 October 2016
The top ten contestants received makeovers, and after having had no challenge or challenge scores, had to rely solely on their performance at a photo shoot session with alternative models at the Skyline Drive-In in Blacktown to guarantee their spot in the competition.: Special guests: Joey Scandizzo, Doll Wright; Featured photographer: Max Doyle
102	5	"Episode 5"	18 October 2016
After a screen test challenge mentored by model-actress Gemma Ward, the top nine contestants took part in a photo shoot session at Cradle Mountain in Tasmania. Belinda was left unable to participate after a medical emergency, and was granted exemption from elimination.: Special guests: Gemma Ward; Featured photographer: Adam Flipp
103	6	"Episode 6"	25 October 2016
The top eight contestants were challenged to walk in a runway show over a pool, where they had to dive underwater and pose in a bid to be granted immunity from the upcoming double elimination. They later took part in a photo shoot session with fire performers.: Featured photographer: Simon Lekias
104	7	"Episode 7"	1 November 2016
The top six contestants took part in a Fitbit look book challenge, for which the winner was awarded the chance of becoming the brand's new ambassador. The contestants were later styled in Jennifer Hawkins' line of swimwear, Cozi, for a shoot that focused entirely on their body while their face was hidden from view.: Special guests: Jaime Hardley, Neysa Goh; Featured photographer: Pierre Toussaint
105	8	"Episode 8"	8 November 2016
The top five contestants were paired off into two teams in a challenge for Mazda, where they had to take their own photos in an attempt to have it featured in the brand's new print campaign. On set, the contestants had to model colorful costume designs, as they were mentored by Australian model Miranda Kerr.: Special guests: Lauren Phillips, Miranda Kerr; Featured photographer: Grahame Shearer
106	9	"Episode 9"	15 November 2016
Immediately following the previous elimination, it was revealed that the top four contestants would be heading overseas to Milan. After arriving, the models took on a casting challenge for Trussardi, for which the winner was awarded double the amount of time in front of the camera for the upcoming photo shoot. On set, the contestants were dressed in Italian fashion labels for an editorial session overlooking the Naviglio Grande. Back in Australia, it was revealed that the final two would advance to the finale.: Special guests: Saverio Rotini, Gaia Trussardi; Featured photographer: Stefania Paparelli
107	10	"Episode 10"	22 November 2016
The final two shot for a mock cover and their winning editorial spread to be published in the December issue of Elle Australia. Later, the formerly eliminated contestants returned for a final runway show, with 40 contestants from all nine seasons of the series. After the judges reviewed the covers from the final photo shoot of the series, Aleyna was crowned as the tenth winner of Australia's Next Top Model.: Special guests: Justine Cullen, Naomi Thompson, Zoe McDonald, Simmone Duckmanton, Chloe Wilson, Gemma Sanderson, Sophie Miller, Madeleine Rose, Simone Viljoen, Eboni Stocks, Cobi Marsh, Steph Flockhart, Danica Brown, Jordan Loukas, Alamela Rowan, Caris Eves, Samantha Downie, Leah Johnsen, Madison Wall, Adele Thiel, Cassi Van Den Dungen, Valeria Nilova, Sally Geach, Amanda Ware, Caroline Austin, Yolanda Hodgson, Jess Bush, Madeline Huett, Izzy Vesey, Simone Holtznagel, Jade Collins, Abbie Weir, Duckie Thot, Kaitlyn Bennett, Ayieda Malou, Phoebe Deskovic, Tanahya Cohen, Izi Simundic, Jordan Burridge, Jess Thomas, Lucy Markovic; Featured photographer: Georges Antoni

== Results ==
=== Elimination table ===
Order	Episodes									
Order	1	2	3	4 (Note: In episode 4, Jessie, Kassidy and Linnea tied for highest score.)	5 (Note: In episode 5, Belinda was deemed unfit to participate in the shoot for medical reasons, and thus only had the opportunity to accumulate a score of 9 for the challenge. In the interest of fairness, she was excused form that week's judging. While she did technically have the lowest overall score, she wasn't eligible for elimination. Panel resumed with the other 8 contestants who took part in both the challenge and photo shoot.)	6 (Note: In episode 6, Linnea was immune from elimination after winning the challenge, and also achieved the highest combined score at panel. This episode also featured a double elimination. Christy was eliminated after she placed lower than Kassidy on the leaderboard, who was last at the time. Despite scoring higher than Christy, Vitoria was also unable to score higher than Kassidy.)	7	8	9 (Note: This episode featured a double elimination. Linnea was eliminated after Daisy placed above her on leaderboard, bumping her to third place. Daisy was eliminated after Aleyna placed above her on the leaderboard as well, bumping her to third place, and Linnea to fourth.)	10
1	Aleyna	Jordan	Kassidy	Jessie	Aleyna	Linnea	Daisy	Linnea	Sabine	Aleyna
2	Jessie	Linnea	Aleyna	Kassidy	Kassidy	Aleyna	Sabine	Aleyna	Aleyna	Sabine
3	Christy	Christy	Sabine	Linnea	Linnea	Daisy	Aleyna	Sabine	Daisy	
4	Linnea	Aleyna	Belinda	Christy	Daisy	Sabine	Kassidy	Daisy	Linnea	
5	Sabine	Jessie	Christy	Aleyna	Vitoria	Belinda	Linnea	Kassidy		
6	Vitoria	Belinda	Vitoria	Daisy	Sabine	Kassidy	Belinda			
7	Jordan	Vitoria	Jessie	Sabine	Christy	Vitoria				
8	Daisy	Sabine	Jordan	Vitoria	Jessie	Christy				
9	Belinda	Daisy	Linnea	Belinda	Belinda					
10	Kassidy	Kassidy	Daisy	Jordan						
11	Laura	Summer	Summer							
12	Summer	Laura								
13	Sofie									

The contestant was eliminated
The contestant had the lowest overall score but was excused from judging
The contestant was immune from elimination
The contestant won the competition

=== Bottom two/three ===
Episode	Contestants	Eliminated
1	Sofie & Summer	Sofie
2	Laura & Summer	Laura
3	Daisy & Summer	Summer
4	Belinda & Jordan	Jordan
5	Christy & Jessie	Jessie
6	Christy & Kassidy	Christy
6	Kassidy & Vitoria	Vitoria
7	Belinda & Linnea	Belinda
8	Daisy & Kassidy	Kassidy
9	Aleyna, Daisy, Linnea & Sabine	Linnea
9	Aleyna, Daisy, Linnea & Sabine	Daisy
10	Aleyna & Sabine	Sabine

The contestant was eliminated after her first time in the bottom two/three
The contestant was eliminated after her second time in the bottom two/three
The contestant was eliminated after her third time in the bottom two/three
The contestant was eliminated in the semi-final judging and placed fourth
The contestant was eliminated in the semi-final judging and placed third
The contestant was eliminated in the final judging and placed as the runner-up

=== Average call-out order ===
Final two is not included.

Rank by average	Place	Model	Call-out total	Number of call-outs	Call-out average
1	1	Aleyna	22	9	2.44
2	4	Linnea	31	9	3.44
3	2	Sabine	39	9	4.33
4	9	Jessie	23	5	4.60
5	8	Christy	29	6	4.83
6	5	Kassidy	42	8	5.25
7	3	Daisy	48	9	5.33
8-10	6	Belinda	39	6	6.50
8-10	7	Vitoria	39	6	6.50
8-10	10	Jordan	26	4	6.50
11	11	Summer	34	3	11.33
12	12	Laura	23	2	11.50
13	13	Sofie	12	1	12.00

=== Scores table ===
Order	Episodes											
Order	1	2	3	4	5 (Note: Belinda was only able to accumulate a partial score of 9 from the challenge after she was unable to complete this episode's photo shoot due to medical reasons. While she had the lowest overall score she was excused from that weeks judging, in the interest of fairness. Only the full sets of scores have been calculated for the total and average scores.)	6	7	8	9	10	Total Score	Average Score
Aleyna	34.5	30.5	33.0	24.5	38.0	35.0	36.0	35.0	38.0	29.5	334.0	33.40
Sabine	28.5	27.0	31.5	21.5	30.5	31.0	37.0	33.5	38.5	29.0	308.0	30.80
Daisy	27.0	26.5	27.5	22.0	33.5	32.5	37.5	31.5	37.5		275.5	30.61
Linnea	29.0	33.5	28.0	25.5	34.0	37.0	32.0	35.5	36.0		290.5	32.28
Kassidy	24.0	26.5	34.5	25.5	34.0	30.0	35.5	31.0			241.0	30.13
Belinda	26.5	27.5	30.5	19.5	9.0	30.5	30.0				164.5	27.42
Vitoria	28.5	27.5	30.0	21.5	32.0	29.5					169.0	28.17
Christy	31.0	31.0	30.0	25.0	28.0	29.0					174.0	29.00
Jessie	32.0	29.0	29.5	25.5	27.0						143.0	28.60
Jordan	27.5	36.0	29.0	19.0							111.5	27.88
Summer	18.5	25.0	27.0								70.5	23.50
Laura	22.0	23.5									45.5	22.75
Sofie	18.0										18.0	18.00

The contestant had the highest total score
The contestant was in danger of elimination
The contestant had the lowest total score and was eliminated
The contestant had the lowest overall score but was excused from judging
The contestant had the highest total score and won the competition

=== Photoshoot guide ===
- Episode 1 photo shoot: High-fashion shoot with Season 7 Winner Montana Cox
- Episode 2 commercial & photo shoot: Colgate Optic White commercial/social media video (Group task)
- Episode 3 photo shoot: Lingerie on a Yacht for Elle Macpherson
- Episode 4 photo shoot: "Alternative Models" shoot at Skyline Drive-In
- Episode 5 photo shoot: Extreme Beauty Shots with Paint (Cradle Mountain, Tasmania)
- Episode 6 photo shoot: Underwater Challenge & Fire Performers
- Episode 7 photo shoot: Fuerza Bruta (Nude on Mylar)
- Episode 8 photo shoot: Mazda Campaign Challenge (Personal Styling/Self-Shooting)
- Episode 9 photo shoot: Vintage Jet Setters
- Episode 10 photo shoot: Editorial spread for Elle Australia (Modern Princess)

=== Makeovers ===
- Jordan - Kellie Crawford blonde
- Jessie - Loose waves with bangs
- Christy - Dyed dark blonde and tight waves
- Vitoria - Tight waves
- Belinda - Geri Halliwell dark red
- Kassidy - Agyness Deyn pixie cut
- Linnea - Leona Lewis inspired loose curls and chest length cut
- Daisy - Cut long angled line
- Sabine - Loose wavy weave
- Aleyna - Tight waves

== Post–Top Model careers ==
- Sofie Baric signed with Harvey James Management. She has taken a couple of test shots and featured in The West Australian May 2021. She has modeled for Billy Bones Club, Sip & Style Co., Goldwell, Lavada Cosmetic Clinic,...
- Laura Taaffe has worked under the name "Beth" and signed with Priscilla's Model Management and Kult Model Management. She has taken a couple of test shots and modeled for The Iconic, Skull Jewellery by Sofia Fitzpatrick, Nifi Bridal, Smitten Cosmetics, Arnsdorf, Emma Mulholland, Incu Clothing Resort 2018,... She has appeared on magazine editorials for Laud June 2017, Harper's Bazaar Singapore September 2017, Oyster #111 September 2017, Fashion Journal September 2017, Lita FW18, Liike November 2018, Priceline AU Spring 2019,... Taaffe retired from modeling in 2019.
- Summer Kane signed with Vivien's Model Management. She has taken a couple of test shots and appeared on magazine editorials for Playboy November 2022, InStyle January 2023, Women's Weekly January 2023,... She has modeled for Lorna Jane, Coach New York, Bras N Things, David Jones, Levi's, Target, Paradigm Apparel, Lilybod, Lipstik Shoes, Frank Body, Beginning Boutique, Swimwear Galore Summer 2018, Wrangler Summer 2018, Mist Clothing, Ozmosis, Just Sunnies, Le Rose Stories FW20, Rocc Natural, M.J. Bale SS22, Lexus, Largo Brewing,... Beside modeling, Kane has appeared in the music video "No Plans To Make Plans" by Lime Cordiale.
- Jordan Simek signed with Vivien's Model Management, Scoop Model Management, The Talent Buro, Red 11 Model Management in Auckland and Castaway Model Management on Bali. She has appeared on magazine cover and editorials for Elegant US #14 February 2018 and walked in fashion shows of Tone Fitness Apparel Resort 2018, Christie Millinery,... She has taken a couple of test shots and modeled for Showpo Summer 2017, S/W/F Boutique, Imonni, Le Rose Stories, Kaiami Swim, Gooseberry Intimates SS18, La Maison Talulah, Tussah The Label, Calli The Label, Tone Fitness Apparel, Bondi Bather, Allfenix, Nicole Fendel, A.K.A Studios, L'urv Sportwear, Ark Swimwear, Eleven Australia, Phylli Designs, Shona Joy, St Frock, InStitchu Summer 2021, Pared Eyewear, Emia Fashion, Colette by Colette Hayman, Superette New Zealand, Mera Silk New Zealand, Front Runner AU, Solis Ecowear Indonesia,...
- Jessie Andrewartha signed with Début Management, The Models Talent Agency and Giant Management. She has modeled for Level Clothing AU, Varacalli Couture,... and appeared on magazine editorials for Teo December 2016, Pump US #2 Summer 2018,... She has taken a couple of test shots and walked in fashion shows of Aje. Clothing, Calèche Bridal House, Varacalli Couture, Atelier Milano, Daisy Says, The Wolf Gang AU,... Andrewartha retired from modeling in 2021.
- Christy Baker signed with Priscilla's Model Management, Chic Management, Que Models and Busy Models. She has taken a couple of test shots and appeared on magazine editorials for Get It Gold Coast September 2017. She has modeled for Intrigue On Rose, Jay Jays, City Beach AU, La' Frock Boutique, Iris & Wool, Aisling Equestrian,...
- Vitoria Triboni signed with Vivien's Model Management. She has taken a couple of test shots and appeared on magazine editorials for Lita SS18. She has modeled for George Habibeh Couture, Jaggad, Cozie Boutique Swimwear, Sant Elia, Sea Level Swim, Sunday Supply Co., Leo Lin SS21, Greg Natale, Chika Bella, Volange Paris, Sotto Brand, Sevigne AU, Ashaya Rituals, NakedLab,...
- Belinda Kosorok has modeled for Brides of Beecroft and appeared on magazine editorials for White Collection #4 January 2018. She has taken a couple of test shots and walked in fashion shows of The Sposa Group, Alémais,... She retired from modeling in 2023.
- Kassidy Ure mainly work as an influencer after the show. She has appeared on magazine editorials for Imirage Canada, Lita December 2016, Solstice UK August 2017, Girlfriend September 2017, Scorpio Jin US #12 September 2017, Faddy Italia May 2021,... and modeled for Marho & Co., Standard Issue New Zealand, Nevada Clothing Co., Kate Ford The Label, Sunshine Dreamer Vintage, Iaminhatelove Cyprus, Charcoal Clothing, Impala Rollerskates,... She retired from modeling in 2020.
- Linnea Stevens-Jones signed with Priscilla's Model Management. She has taken a couple of test shots and walked in fashion show for The Injury AU FW23.24. She has modeled for Wrangler, Steve Madden, Nice Martin, Sass & Bide SS18, Nathan Cherrington, Luxe Deluxe Summer 2018, Fillyboo, Tree Of Life AU Spring 2022, Deux /Of Them, Shevoke, Misfit Shapes Winter 2022, Bassike Spring 2023, Saski Collection, Lyst AU, Wynn Hamlyn, Briar Will, Niicolé Jewellery,... and appeared on magazine cover and editorials for Lita Summer 2017, 7Hues US #10 October 2018, Kaltblut Germany November 2018, Black New Zealand August 2020, 10 Magazine #16 FW20, Gmaro France #39 February 2021, Gritty Pretty #26 March 2021, Astrophe May 2021, Marie Claire June 2021, Moevir France May 2022, To Be #5 May 2023,...
- Daisy Davies signed with Priscilla's Model Management, Scoop Model Management, 4 Walls Management, Two Management & The Industry Model Management in Los Angeles. She has taken a couple of test shots and walked in fashion show of Specsavers, We Are Kindred FW18,... She has modeled for Ally Fashion, Billabong, Nice Martin, Sambag AU FW17, Lady Kate Knitwear FW18, Good&Co FW18, Jennifer Gibson Jewellery, Sheike & Co, Tigerlily Swimwear Resort 2019, Ronda Wear, Byiris Collection,... and appeared on magazine editorials for Miami Living US August 2017, Estela US August 2017, Andivero Canada April 2018, Pageone July 2018, Others US March 2022,... Davies retired from modeling in 2023.
- Sabine Jamieson signed with Priscilla's Model Management and Clyne Model Management. She has taken a couple of test shots and walked in fashion show of Eliya The Label, Wild Pony Swimwear SS18, Tigerlily Swimwear Resort 2019,... She has modeled for Calvin Klein, Wrangler, Sportsgirl, Bassike, Nice Martin, Sir The Label, Cotton On, In Bed Store, By Johnny., Brigid McLaughlin Fall 2017, Cue Clothing Co, Insight 51, Oh Hej Hej FW18, Penny Sage, Lenni The Label, Megan Park FW19, FP Movement, The Saint Helena, Bowie Rae, Mahsa Label New Zealand, Edge Clothing Summer 2020, Kloke AU, Milk & Thistle Label, Loess Perfume, Women Of Misfit, Kashi Clothing, La Bottega Di Brunella FW24,... and appeared on magazine cover and editorials for Russh, Sunday Life, Vilkan US January 2017, Bullett US February 2017, Fashion Journal April 2017, Damaged US June 2017, The Atlas US July 2017, Pageone September 2018,...
- Aleyna FitzGerald has collected her prizes and signed with Priscilla's Model Management. She is also signed with DNA Model Management in New York City, D'Management Group in Milan, Premier Model Management in London, View Management in Barcelona, Marilyn Agency, Silent Models & Ford Models in Paris. She has modeled for many brands including Balmain, Nordstrom, Ralph Lauren, R. M. Williams, Napoleon Perdis, Zara, Fendi, Yves Saint Laurent, Mango, Alex Perry, Oscar De La Renta, Camilla and Marc, Oroton, Sass & Bide, Romance Was Born, Max Mara, Helmut Lang, Oscar De La Renta, Anine Bing, Emporio Armani, Joseph Altuzarra, Ash Global,... and appeared on magazine cover and editorials for Elle, Harper's Bazaar, Marie Claire, Vogue, Russh, Inprint, 10 Magazine #12 FW18, Vogue Taiwan August 2018, InStyle October 2019, Elle US November 2019, Make UK #12 December 2019, Elle Indonesia March 2020, Vogue Paris July 2020, T Singapore September 2020, Her World Singapore November 2020, The Edition Italia November 2020, Badlands Journal February 2021, Jane #9 April 2021, Vogue Singapore September 2022, CR Fashion Book US September 2022, Love Want #32 March 2024,... FitzGerald has taken part in many fashion shows including Yves Saint Laurent, Valentino, Dior, Chanel, Marc Jacobs, Tadashi Shoji, Blumarine, Giorgio Armani, Balmain, Zimmermann, Emporio Armani, Ermanno Scervino, Dolce & Gabbana, Elie Saab, Giambattista Valli, David Jones, Christopher John Rogers, Ralph Lauren, Tory Burch, Brandon Maxwell, Sacai, Rodarte, Victoria Beckham, Jill Stuart, Marchesa, Margaret Howell, Joseph Altuzarra, GCDS, Esteban Cortázar, David Koma, Hussein Chalayan, Moschino, John Galliano, Kate Spade New York, Elie Tahari, Ulla Johnson, Carolina Herrera, Kenzo, Alberta Ferretti, Rochas, Givenchy, Helmut Lang, Anna Sui, Tommy Hilfiger, Oscar De La Renta,...

== Viewership ==
No.	Title	Air date	Overnight ratings		Ref(s)
No.	Title	Air date	Viewers	Rank	Ref(s)
1	Episode 1	20 September 2016	65,000	7	
2	Episode 2	27 September 2016	69,000	6	
3	Episode 3	4 October 2016	80,000	2	
4	Episode 4	11 October 2016	77,000	3	
5	Episode 5	18 October 2016	74,000	4	
6	Episode 6	25 October 2016	74,000	4	
7	Episode 7	1 November 2016	95,000	1	
8	Episode 8	8 November 2016	98,000	1	
9	Episode 9	15 November 2016	91,000	3	
10	Episode 10	22 November 2016	162,000	1	
