= Australia's Next Top Model season 6 =

Australia's Next Top Model
- Season 6
- Judges: Sarah Murdoch; Alex Perry; Charlotte Dawson; Jez Smith
- No. of contestants: 16
- Winner: Amanda Ware
- No. of episodes: 11

Release
- Original network: Fox8
- Original release: 20 July – 28 September 2010

Season chronology
- ← Previous; Season 5 Next → Season 7

The sixth season of Australia's Next Top Model premiered on 20 July 2010 on Fox8. Sarah Murdoch returned as the host and leading judge for this season. Alex Perry and Charlotte Dawson also returned as judges.

The prizes for this season included a one-year modelling contract with Priscilla's Model Management, a A$25,000 contract to be the face Levi’s, a trip to New York to meet with Elite Model Management, a brand new Ford Fiesta Zetec, an eight-page editorial spread and the cover of Harper's Bazaar Australia, and A$20,000 courtesy of U by Kotex.

The winner of the competition was 17-year-old Amanda Ware from Mermaid Beach, Queensland.

== Series summary ==
A few major changes were made this season. Jez Smith returned as part of the judging panel for the first time since the third season, and Jonathan Pease was replaced by fashion icon Josh Flinn, due to the former's work conflicts. Filming took place from May through June 2010. The number of contestants this season was increased from 13 to 16. The model house was located on 21 Hunter St, in Sydney's eastern suburb of Dover Heights. In contrast to the previous three seasons, the viewer vote entirely determined the winner and placements of each contestant during the live finale. Beginning this season, there was also a shift in the series' tone, with less focus being placed on quarrels among the contestants.

=== Requirements ===
As with previous seasons, all contestants had to be aged 16 or older to be eligible for the show. Those auditioning were required to have a minimum height of at least 172 centimetres (68 in) tall. To qualify, all applicants had to be Australian citizens residing in Australia. Additional requirements stated that contestants should not have had prior experience as a model in a national campaign within the last five years. If a contestant was represented by an agent or a manager, she had to terminate that representation prior to the competition.

=== Auditions ===
Auditions were held on 16–17 January in Sydney, on 19–20 January in Brisbane, on 21 January in Bendigo, on 23 January in Adelaide and on 24 January in Perth.

== Cast ==
=== Contestants ===
(Ages stated are at start of contest)

Contestant	Age	Height	Hometown	Finish	Place
Alison Boxer	16	176 cm (5 ft 9 1/2 in)	Yarraville	Episode 1	16–12
Valeria Nilova	17	172 cm (5 ft 7 1/2 in)	Rostrevor	Episode 1	16–12
Ashlea Monigatti	16	175 cm (5 ft 9 in)	Echuca	Episode 1	16–12
Sally Geach	19	172 cm (5 ft 7 1/2 in)	Bull Creek	Episode 1	16–12
Claire Smith	18	177 cm (5 ft 9 1/2 in)	Sorrento	Episode 1	16–12
Megan Jacob	17	173 cm (5 ft 8 in)	Park Orchards	Episode 2	11
Ashton Flutey	18	183 cm (6 ft 0 in)	Collaroy	Episode 3	10
Chantal Croccolo	20	177 cm (5 ft 9 1/2 in)	Bankstown	Episode 4	9
Kimberly Thrupp	20	178 cm (5 ft 10 in)	Burleigh Waters	Episode 5	8
Brittney Dudley	16	183 cm (6 ft 0 in)	Clare	Episode 6	7
Joanna Broomfield	18	173 cm (5 ft 8 in)	North Adelaide	Episode 7	6
Kathryn Lyons	20	175 cm (5 ft 9 in)	Jamboree Heights	Episode 8	5
Jessica Moloney	19	180 cm (5 ft 11 in)	Harvey	Episode 9	4
Sophie Van Den Akker	19	173 cm (5 ft 8 in)	Croydon	Episode 11	3
Kelsey Martinovich	19	172 cm (5 ft 7 1/2 in)	Lennox Head	Episode 11	2
Amanda Ware	17	176 cm (5 ft 9 1/2 in)	Mermaid Beach	Episode 11	1

=== Judges ===
- Sarah Murdoch (host)
- Alex Perry
- Charlotte Dawson
- Jez Smith

=== Other cast members ===
- Josh Flinn – style director, model mentor

== Episodes ==
No. overall	No. in season	Title	Original release date
52	1	"The First Step"	20 July 2010
The top sixteen contestants arrived in Sydney and met host Sarah Murdoch before being cast for a Harper's Bazaar Designer Selection show in Australian Fashion Week. Afterwards, the contestants were taken to their new home in the outskirts of Sydney. At the photo shoot, the contestants were styled in 1950s inspired clothing from the TV series, Mad Men, and a mass-elimination at panel saw five of the contestants sent home from the competition.: Special guests: Claudia Navone, Nikola Koke, Priscilla Leighton-Clark; Featured photographer: Jez Smith
53	2	"21st Century Denim"	27 July 2010
The top eleven contestants travelled to Chatswood to shoot a mock viral campaign for Levi's, and later arrived at Foxtel Studios for a challenge in which they had to audition as co-hosts for a live program on Channel V. At the photo shoot, the contestants were taken to a shipping dock, where they were harnessed onto a scaffold to shoot for a denim campaign.: Special guests: Erin McNaught, Danny Clayton, Renee Bargh, David Bonnie, Bettina Liano; Featured photographer: Harold David
54	3	"Before and After"	3 August 2010
The top ten contestants received a visit from season 5 winner Tahnee Atkinson, and received makeovers. They later had a posing and endurance challenge at the Vivid Sydney festival, and the winner was treated with a getaway at a 5-star hotel. At the photo shoot, the models were styled with jewellery for an edgy beauty shoot that highlighted their new look.: Special guests: Tahnee Atkinson, Joh Bailey, Emma Balfour, Claudia Navone; Featured photographer: Jason Capobianco
55	4	"Nowhere to Hide"	10 August 2010
The top nine contestants met renowned Olympic swimmer Michael Klim for an exercise session, before being introduced to swimsuit model Cheyenne Tozzi, who coached the contestants on swimwear posing. At the challenge, the contestants were cast in a show for Megan Gale's swimsuit collection with a liminted number of spots, and the winner received a 5-night stay at a luxury resort in Queensland for her and a friend. The contestants later posed in swimwear on the beach for the week's photo shoot.: Special guests: Michael Klim, Cheyenne Tozzi, Megan Gale; Featured photographer: Pierre Toussaint
56	5	"Looks of the Street"	17 August 2010
Priscilla Leighton-Clark arrived to the top model house to go over each contestant's model style, and announced that they would be heading to Melbourne to attend castings for Life With Bird, J'Aton and Alannah Hill. The winner of the casting challenge received a piece from each designer, including a bespoke piece especially designed by J'Aton. Back in Sydney, the top eight contestants had a photo shoot for Impulse in which they had to embody different fragrances, with the best performer being given the opportunity to front a national ad campaign.: Special guests: Alannah Hill, J'Aton, Priscilla Leighton-Clarke, Warren Minde; Featured photographer: Simon Upton
57	6	"Magazine Animals"	24 August 2010
The top seven contestants received a lesson on their best angles and expressions from judge Jez Smith, and later shot for a Telstra television advertisement with a limited number of spots. The client for the photo shoot was Cosmopolitan, and the contestamts had to pose with different animals in the hopes of having their photo run in an editorial for the magazine.: Special guests: Nikola Koke, Josh Logue, Chantal Walker, Bronwyn McCahon; Featured photographer: Richard Freeman
58	7	"Fashionably Freezing"	31 August 2010
The top six contestants were divided into teams of two and took part in different physical activities with the judges. They were later taken to The Metro Theatre to walk in an underwear show for Bonds lingerie in order to score an ad campaign for the brand. At the crack of dawn, the contestants were driven to Thredbo for a photo shoot in the Snowy Mountains where they had to pose with vintage lingerie and animal pelts in the freezing temperatures.: Special guests: Kris Smith, Evermore, Priscilla Leighton-Clark; Featured photographer: David Shields
59	8	"Now It's Serious"	7 September 2010
The top five contestants received runway practice through the streets of Sydney with mentor Josh Flinn, while they were secretly being watched by Anneliese Seubert and Alex Perry. Afterwards, they shot to score a national advertising campaign for Platinum from U by Kotex. For the photo shoot, the contestants had to model high-end international designer labels on a luxury yacht.: Special guests: Anneliese Seubert, Monty Noble; Featured photographer: Georges Antoni
60	9	"Lost In Translation"	14 September 2010
The top four contestants were flown to Tokyo, and had a photo shoot session wearing traditional Japanese kimono. The contestants later took part in a shopping challenge that explored different kawaii trends for a fashion segment, and had a second photo shoot at a busy intersection in Shibuya wearing avant-garde street wear before heading back to Australia for elimination.: Special guests: Misako Aoki, Yu Kimura, Hikari Yamakawa, Yunkoro, Aya Suzuki, Hiroko Sumikura, Sonoko Ishii, Jason Coates, Doll Wright; Featured photographers: Tomohisa Tobitsuka (kimono), Jez Smith (Shibuya)
61	10	"The Final Three"	21 September 2010
The top three contestants participated in a couture fashion show for the Sony Foundation in front of the judges, and after a high-pressure fitting under the scrutiny of Harper's Bazaar editor Edwina McCann, they prepared for a grueling two-day photo shoot session in which they had their winning editorials and covers taken. At panel, the judges determined that there would be no elimination, and that the top three contestants would advance to the live finale.: Special guests: Claudia Navone, Christine Centenera, Edwina McCann; Featured photographer: Simon Lekias
62	11	"Live Finale"	28 September 2010
The show had a retrospective look back at the season. The live final began with an introduction of the judges before reuniting all top sixteen contestants. The top three contestants were interviewed, and had a look back at moments from the show. After showing the final Harper's Baazar covers of the top three contestants, Sophie was eliminated from the competition. The final votes were later tallied, and Kelsey was revealed to be the sixth winner of Australia's Next Top Model. In a shocking turn of events, host Sarah Murdoch announced that the final results were fed to her wrong, and that the actual winner of the competition was Amanda.: Special guests: Claudia Navone, Priscilla Leighton-Clarke

== Summaries ==
Order	Episodes											
Order	1 (Note: In episode 1, Alison, Ashlea, Claire, Kimberly, Sally and Valeria landed in the bottom six. Sarah Murdoch handed the last photograph to Kimberly, eliminating the other five contestants.)	2	3	4	5	6	7	8	9	10 (Note: In episode 10 Kelsey and Sophie landed in the bottom two, neither of them was eliminated, and all three contestants advanced to the live final.)	11	
1	Amanda	Kathryn	Kelsey	Joanna	Kathryn	Amanda	Sophie	Amanda	Sophie	Amanda	Kelsey	Amanda
2	Joanna	Joanna	Kimberly	Kelsey	Joanna	Jessica	Kathryn	Sophie	Kelsey	Kelsey; Sophie	Amanda	Kelsey
3	Kathryn	Amanda	Kathryn	Brittney	Kelsey	Kelsey	Jessica	Jessica	Amanda	Kelsey; Sophie	Sophie	
4	Kelsey	Jessica	Jessica	Kathryn	Jessica	Sophie	Amanda	Kelsey	Jessica			
5	Sophie	Sophie	Joanna	Sophie	Sophie	Joanna	Kelsey	Kathryn				
6	Chantal	Kelsey	Amanda	Jessica	Amanda	Kathryn	Joanna					
7	Megan	Brittney	Chantal	Amanda	Brittney	Brittney						
8	Jessica	Ashton	Sophie	Kimberly	Kimberly							
9	Ashton	Chantal	Brittney	Chantal								
10	Brittney	Kimberly	Ashton									
11	Kimberly	Megan										
12-16	Alison; Ashlea; Claire; Sally; Valeria											

The contestant was eliminated
The contestant was part of a non-elimination bottom two
The contestant won the competition

=== Bottom two ===
Episode	Contestants	Eliminated
1	Alison, Ashlea, Claire, Kimberly, Sally & Valeria	Alison
1	Alison, Ashlea, Claire, Kimberly, Sally & Valeria	Ashlea
1	Alison, Ashlea, Claire, Kimberly, Sally & Valeria	Claire
1	Alison, Ashlea, Claire, Kimberly, Sally & Valeria	Sally
1	Alison, Ashlea, Claire, Kimberly, Sally & Valeria	Valeria
2	Kimberly & Megan	Megan
3	Brittney & Ashton	Ashton
4	Chantal & Kimberley	Chantal
5	Brittney & Kimberley	Kimberly
6	Brittney & Kathryn	Brittney
7	Joanna & Kelsey	Joanna
8	Kathryn & Kelsey	Kathryn
9	Amanda & Jessica	Jessica
10	Kelsey & Sophie	None
11	Amanda, Kelsey & Sophie	Sophie
11	Amanda & Kelsey	Kelsey

The contestant was eliminated after her first time in the bottom two/three
The contestant was eliminated after her second time in the bottom two/three
The contestant was eliminated after her third time in the bottom two/three
The contestant was eliminated after her fourth time in the bottom two/three
The contestant was eliminated in the final judging and placed third
The contestant was eliminated in the final judging and placed as the runner-up

=== Average call-out order ===
Final two is not included.

Rank by average	Place	Model	Call-out total	Number of call-outs	Call-out average
3	1	Amanda	35	11	3.18
2	5	Kathryn	25	8	3.12
4	6	Joanna	23	7	3.28
1	2	Kelsey	33	11	3.00
5	3	Sophie	41	11	3.73
6	4	Jessica	38	9	4.22
7		Brittney	43	6	7.17
8	9	Chantal	31	4	7.75
9	8	Kimberly	39	5	7.80
10–11	10	Ashton	27	3	9.00
10–11	11	Megan	18	2	9.00
12–16		Alison	12	1	12.00
12–16		Ashlea	12	1	12.00
12–16		Claire	12	1	12.00
12–16		Sally	12	1	12.00
12–16		Valeria	12	1	12.00

=== Photoshoot Guide ===
- Episode 1 Photoshoot: Mad Men-inspired Clothing Style from the 1950s
- Episode 2 Photoshoot: Denim Campaign
- Episode 3 Photoshoot: High fashion beauty shoot
- Episode 4 Photoshoot: Swimwear on the Beach
- Episode 5 Photoshoot: Impulse Advertisement Campaign
- Episode 6 Photoshoot: Accessories with Animals for Cosmopolitan
- Episode 7 Photoshoot: Vintage Lingerie and Fur in the Snow
- Episode 8 Photoshoot: High Fashion Garments on a Yacht
- Episode 9 Photoshoots: Traditional Kimonos; Avant-garde Street Wear
- Episode 10 Photoshoot: Cruise editorial for Harper's Bazaar

=== Makeovers ===
- Ashton - Tight waves and a mild trim
- Chantal - Melanie Chisholm brown and bangs swept
- Kimberly - Liza Minnelli inspired pixie cut with bangs and dyed red
- Brittney - Loose curly weave
- Joanna - Dyed dark brown, loose waves and a mild trim
- Kathryn - Twiggy light blonde
- Jessica - Long straight black layers with bangs
- Sophie - layered bob cut with bangs swept and dyed dark blonde; later, pixie cut
- Kelsey - Long dark brown weave with bangs
- Amanda - Hair straighten

== Controversy ==
Due to an error during the live finale broadcast, Kelsey Martinovich was initially announced as the winner. Consequently, she won several prizes usually reserved for the winner; including a A$25,000 cash prize, an all expenses paid trip to New York to meet with potential modeling agents and a dulled cover and spread in Harper's Bazaar Australia. The magazine decided to split the cover of the November issue, printing half featuring Amanda on the cover and the other featuring Kelsey.

In the days following the airing of the live final, the show was accused of feigning the botched announcement as a publicity stunt. Concerning accusations targeted toward Sarah Murdoch, judge Alex Perry commented: "There's no way that she would do that. I think you saw that the instant that she knew something was wrong, you could see it in her eyes, that wasn't lying, that wasn't acting. Everybody wants to tag something sinister on it and say it was done for ratings (but) I know Sarah and I know the executive producer, it's just not their style, they have too much integrity"

Sarah Murdoch later made an appearance with the finalists for an exclusive interview on A Current Affair, in which she went into detail over the incident. In it, Murdoch expressed her dismay: "I still feel sick about it, I mean, I'm still in shock about it. We'd had such a brilliant show, and amazing series to begin with, a fantastic live show, and in the last minute everything went wrong." When questioned about the stunt accusations and accurate vote count, Murdoch affirmed that everything had gone as intended, and it had simply been a miscommunication.
