= Australian Fashion Week =

Australian fashion industry event

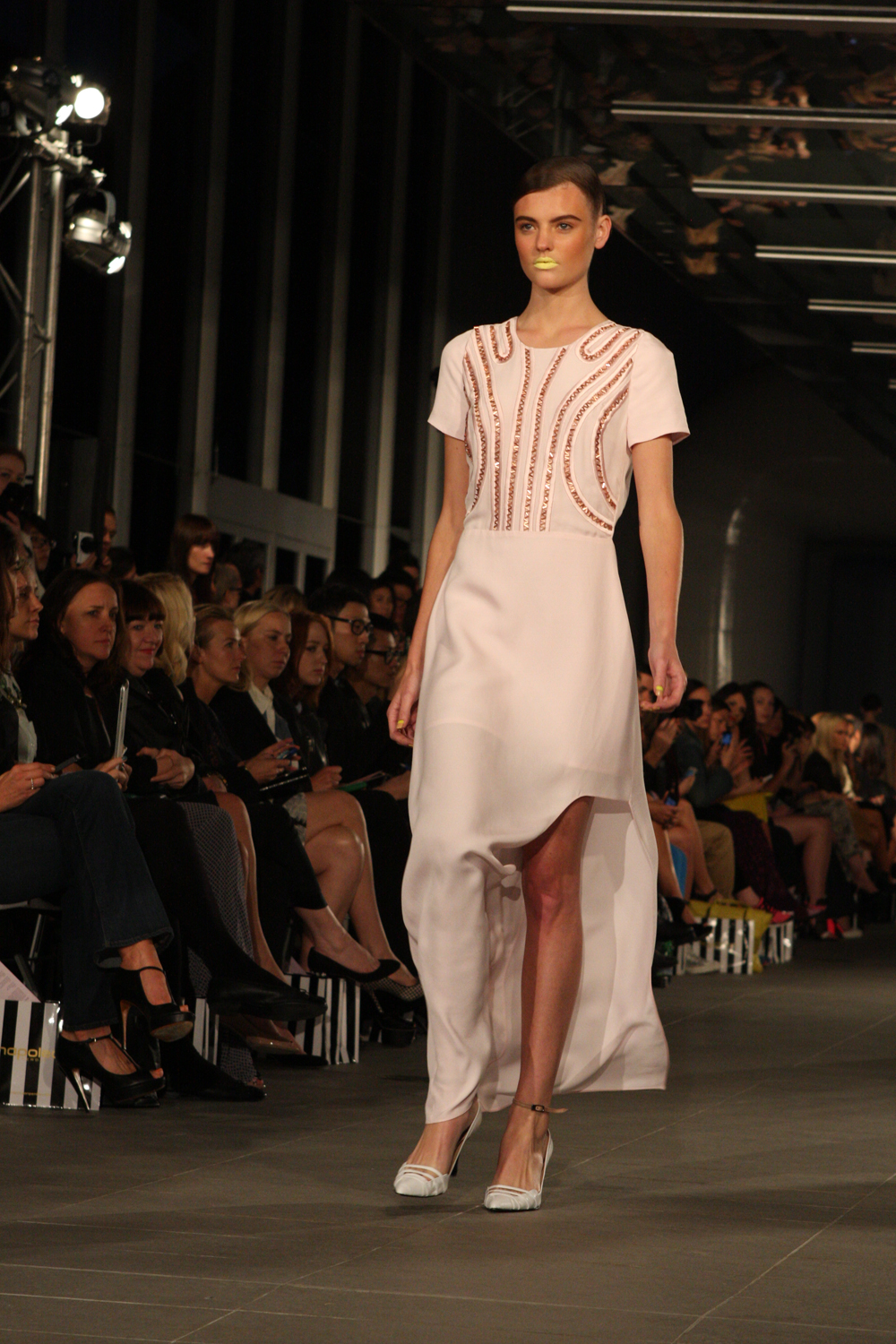
- Montana Cox modelling a design by Magdalena Velevska, 2012
- Genre: Fashion catwalk shows and surrounding events
- Frequency: Annual
- Locations: Sydney, Australia
- Inaugurated: 1996; 30 years ago
- Attendance: 5,000+
- Organiser: Australian Fashion Council
- Website: australianfashionweek.org

Australian Fashion Week is an annual fashion industry event, or fashion week, showcasing the latest seasonal collections from Australian designers.

Fashion weeks take place all around the world and often have a significant influence on the trends that follow throughout the year. They were originally established as trade shows, presenting upcoming collections to buyers from across the world. Now, they represent an opportunity for physical and digital exposure.

Australia's fashion week is not only limited to fashion trends. Hair and make up trends are also a big part of the event and designers often take the opportunity to make big statements through their designs.

== History ==
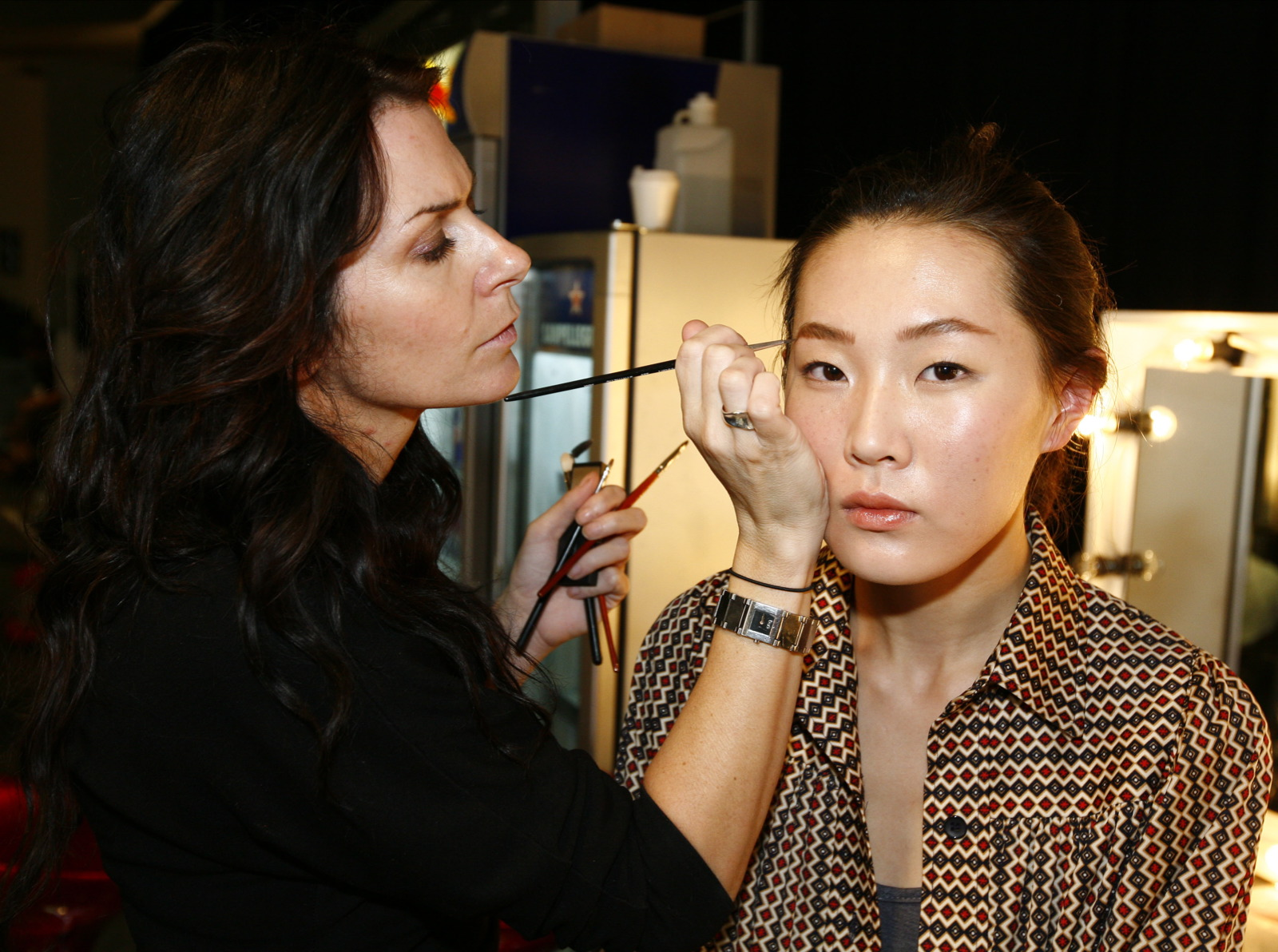
Backstage at the Lee Summers show in Sydney, Spring/Summer 2007

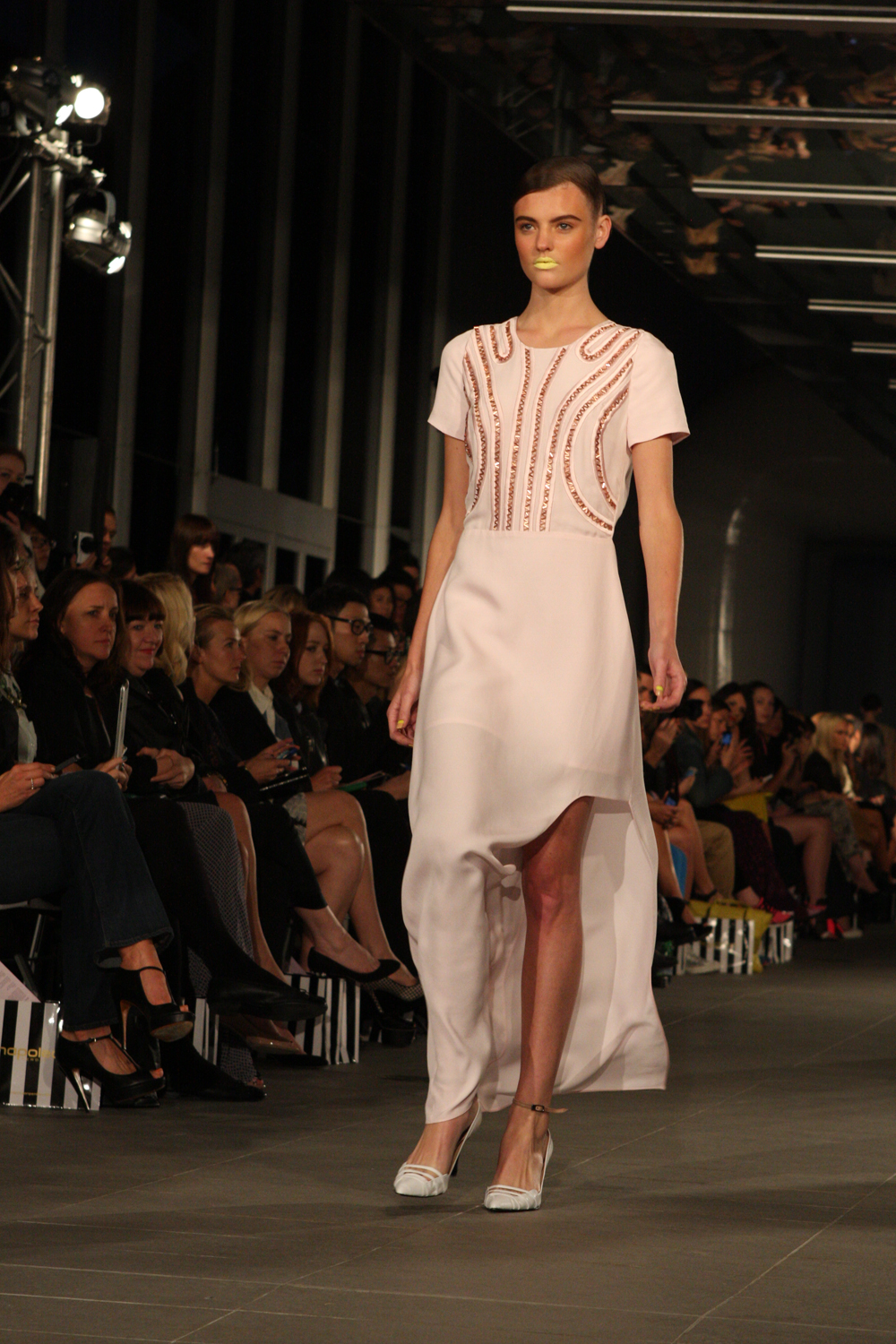
Montana Cox showcasing designs by Magdalena Velevska at the Australian Fashion Week Spring Summer 2012/2013

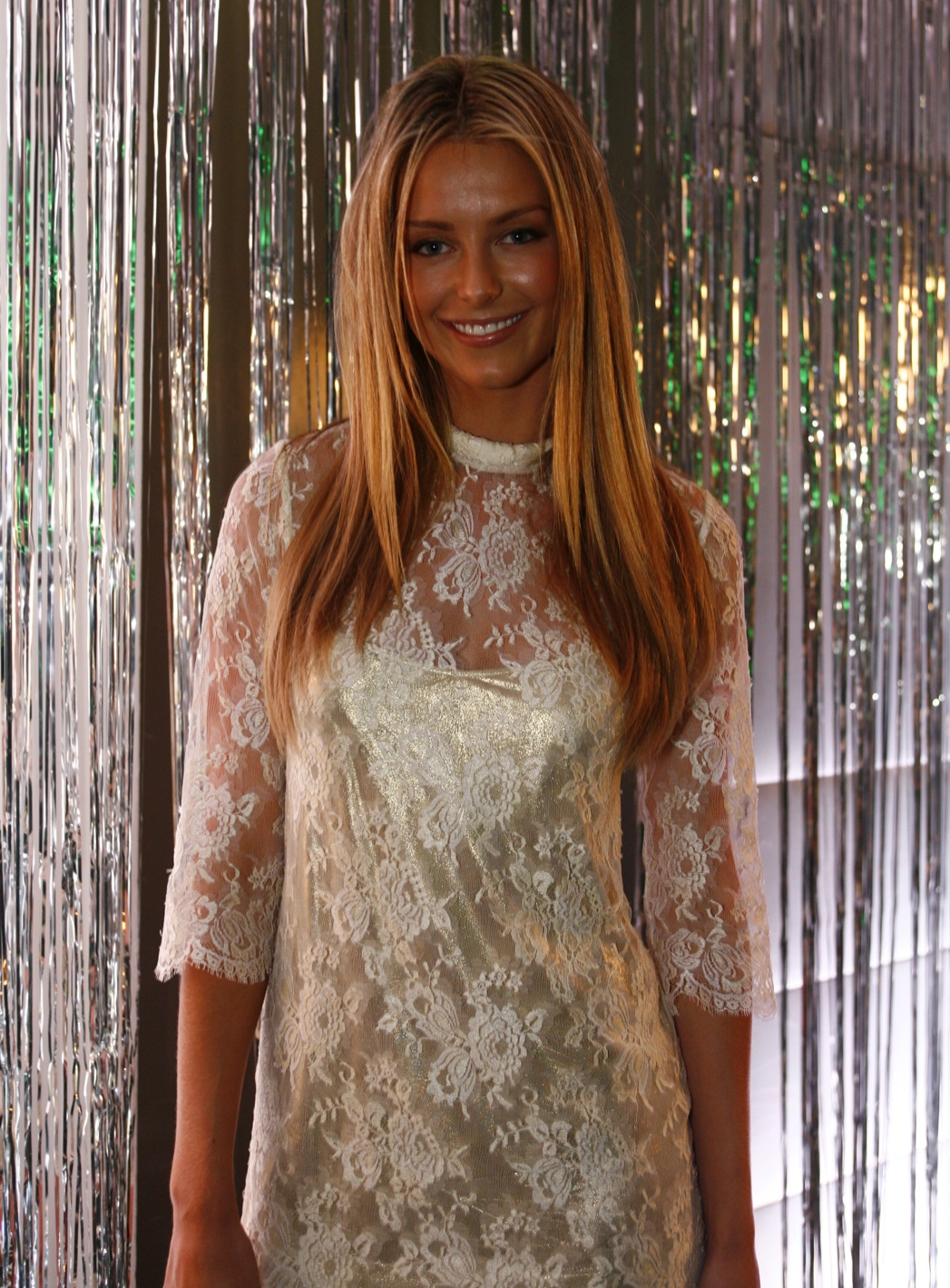
Jennifer Hawkins at Australian Fashion Week in May 2007

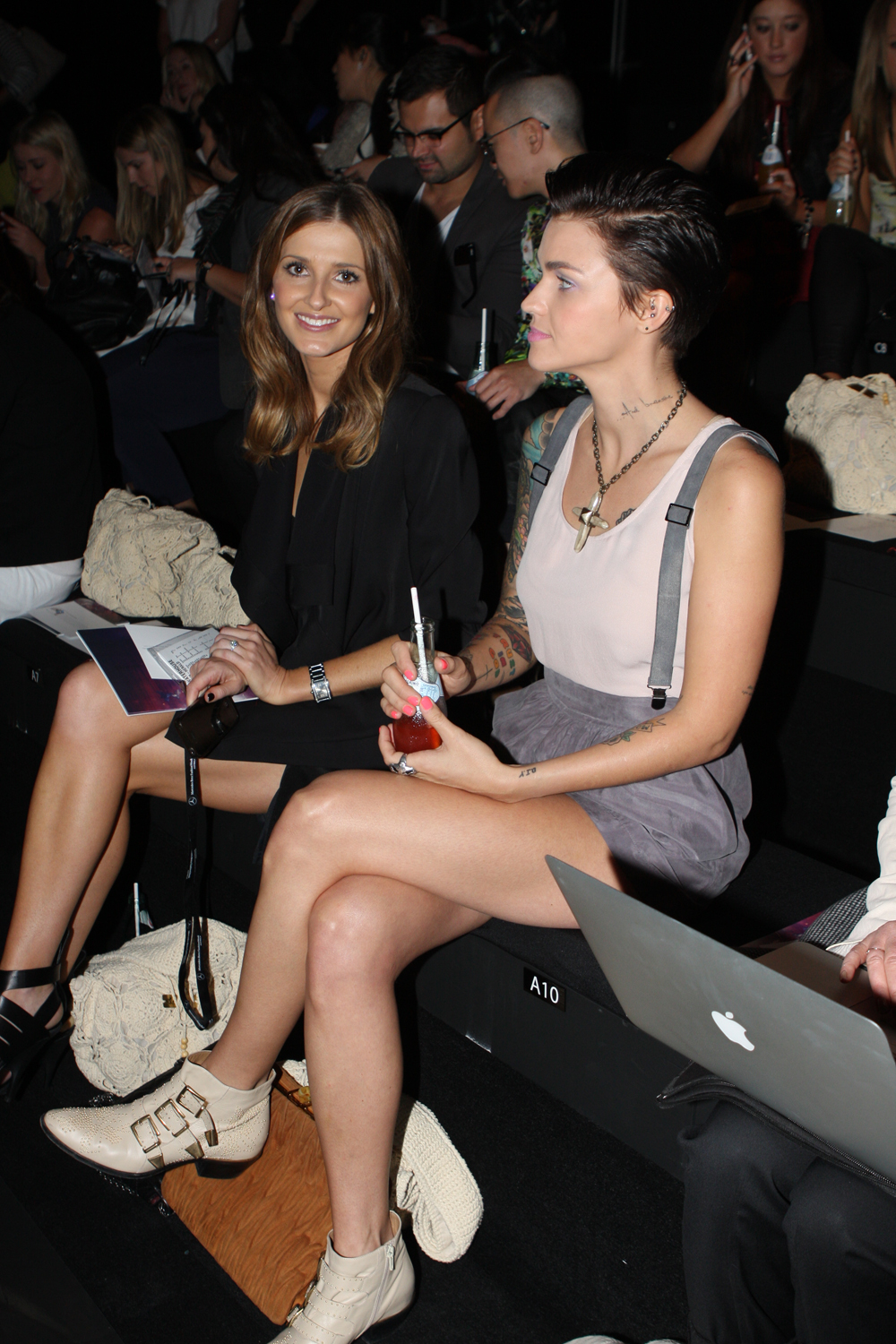
Kate Waterhouse (left), daughter of Gai Waterhouse, and Ruby Rose (right) seated at the 2012 show

The event was the brainchild of PR consultant and former ski magazine reporter Simon Lock. Launched in 1996, in its debut year the event featured shows by Australian designers including Akira Isogawa, Alex Perry and Wayne Cooper. The event had mixed success; British fashion writer Susan Owens wrote a scathing review dubbing it "Fashion Weak" and writing that 25 broken-hearted designers had thrown away their money.

In 2005, event founder Simon Lock sold the event and its parent company Australian Fashion Innovators to IMG. The deal was rumoured to have been worth several million dollars.

Rosemount Estate wineries succeeded Mercedes-Benz as naming right sponsor in 2006 and the event was renamed Rosemount Australian Fashion Week (RAFW). The naming rights sponsorship passed back to Mercedes-Benz in 2011. In 2020, Afterpay took on the naming rights of the event.

Lock worked with IMG for the next five years before departing the company in 2010. In 2011 he was presented with the Australian Fashion Laureate Award, the first non-designer to receive it. At the time he was building a ski hotel in Japan and spending more time with his children.

In 2012 a TV Special of AFW aired on Foxtel channel Arena, produced by Rod Cleland and Mosman Media. They went on to produce AFW on Network 10 in 2013 and 2014. In 2020, Australian Fashion Week was cancelled due to the COVID-19 pandemic and the consequent public gathering and travel restrictions.

The 2021 event was sponsored by Afterpay. Two new Indigenous Australian events introduced 13 First Nations designers to the wider industry, including Grace Lillian Lee, Ngarru Miimi, Aarli, Kirrikin Australia, Maara Collective, Liandra Swim and Ngali.

In November 2024, IMG withdrew from backing the event. In 2025 it will be managed by the Bashful Group.

== Notable models and events ==
In 1997, supermodel Linda Evangelista's appearance in the Alex Perry show drew international attention to the event. Eva Herzigova donned a $500,000 pearl bikini to launch Tigerlily's first runway show in 2001.

Jade Jagger modelled for Charlie Brown in 2005. Dita Von Teese was a guest of honour in 2007, giving a sexy performance that featured her straddling a giant MAC lipstick. Singer Macy Gray performed at the Marcs show in 2008, and celebrity fashion blogger Susie Bubble covered the 2010 event.

In the early 21st century, 2001 saw some notorious appearances of animals as a runway gimmick. Model Kristy Hinze wore a snakeskin bikini with a live snake draped around her shoulders. It began to wrap itself around her neck, to her evident discomfort. Meanwhile, streetwear label Ksubi (then named Tsubi) released 169 live rats onto the runway, one of which was killed, prompting an RSPCA investigation.

In 2013, AFW exhibited many of the same Australian designers, while also introducing upcoming designers. These new generation 2013 included Betty Train, Desert Designs, Faddoul, Jamie Ashkar, Natalie & Sarah, The Letter Q, and Tristan Melle. Some of the most praised designers showcased on the runway were White Sands, Christopher Esber, Bec and Bridge, Aurelio Costarella, and Camilla and Marc.

== Venues ==
Australian Fashion Week has previously been held in April/May at the Fox Film Studios, Moore Park in Sydney, and at St Kilda Pier in Melbourne. In 2013 Fashion Week moved from the Overseas Passenger Terminal in The Rocks to the Carriageworks in Eveleigh. In 2026 it will move to the Museum of Contemporary Art (MCA) at Circular Quay.

== Governance ==
From 2005 until 2024, it was run by IMG, in association with sponsors.

The Australian Fashion Council (AFC) subsequently took ownership in 2025, managing the event via its subsidiary, AFC Fashion Events.

== Impact and criticism ==
Many well-known and influential designers as well as new and upcoming designers participate in the fashion festival. Some of the designers include Alice McCall, Bec & Bridge, Ginger & Smart, Ksubi, Lisa Ho, Oroton, We Are Handsome and Whitesands. Australian Fashion Week has helped bring global attention to a number of Australian designers such as Lisa Ho, Alice McCall, Alex Perry, Toni Maticevski, Collette Dinnigan, Leona Edmiston, and J'Aton Couture.

Australian Fashion Week has attracted criticism of being out of sync with the global fashion market; some popular designers pulled out of the 2012 event in order to prepare for international events. In 2015, the event was changed to May to become the global Resort show for fashion buyers and media.

The event has been criticised for featuring inexperienced emerging designers rather than big names, that its collections are conspicuously influenced by European designers, and that it resorts to cheap theatrics that have included everything from Afghan hounds to midgets in lederhosen. However, fashion journalist Marion Hume argues that the non-participation of established designers is welcome. "It lets those designers grow [by going overseas] and gives space for younger ones to come up", she said. "It's a natural progression and shows a healthiness in Australian Fashion Week".

== Mercedes-Benz Fashion Festival Sydney ==
Mercedes-Benz Fashion Festival Sydney was a schedule of fashion events showcasing the contemporary Spring Summer Collections of Australia's leading designer brands. The festival was held at the Sydney Town Hall and throughout the city, months after Australian Fashion Week, hosted by IMG and Mercedes-Benz fashion week, connecting it with the same designers and production style. As retailers struggled with declining sales, MBFF was pitched as an event to show consumers how to wear the clothes currently on the retail racks. IMG fashion hosted the whole event, and had control over both Fashion Week and the festival.In 2013 a TV Special of MBFFS was produced by Rod Cleland and Mosman Media for Channel 7 and hosted by Tom Williams and Sarah Cummings.

Although Mercedes-Benz Fashion Festival Sydney was primarily based during Australian Fashion week, they also supported and put together runway shows throughout the year for the designer brands they supported. In May 2013, the festival hosted a fashion-focused seminar featuring Mercedes Benz Fashion Week Australia designers Camilla and Marc and Kirrily Johnston.

== Mercedes-Benz Fashion Festival Brisbane ==
Mercedes-Benz Fashion Festival Brisbane is a schedule of fashion events showcasing the contemporary Spring Summer Collections of Australia's leading designer brands. The festival is held at the Brisbane City Hall and throughout the city in August.

== See also ==
- Fashion week
- List of fashion events
- Melbourne Fashion Festival
