= Cassi Van Den Dungen =

Australian fashion model

- Born: Cassandra Jade Van Den Dungen; St Albans, Victoria, Australia
- Spouse: Brad Saul (fiance)
- Modeling information
- Height: 1.79 m (5 ft 10 1/2 in)
- Hair color: Brown
- Eye color: Brown

Cassandra Jade "Cassi" Van Den Dungen is an Australian fashion model. At 16, Van Den Dungen competed on the fifth cycle of Australia's Next Top Model, going on to be runner-up.

== Early life ==
Van Den Dungen grew up in the town of Sunbury, Victoria, Australia. In press interviews, she has described Sunbury as a "ghetto", which caused controversy and frustration among Sunbury residents and the City Council Mayor, Jack Ogilvie, causing him to call her a "very immature, silly little girl".

== Australia's Next Top Model ==
Van Den Dungen received a spot as one of the thirteen contestants on the fifth season of Australia's Next Top Model in 2009. She immediately caused controversy on the show and became the centre of media attention. Van Den Dungen began the competition as one of the shows' front runners, though her performance later declined in following weeks.

She was eventually chosen as one of the finalists in the show's tenth episode, joining fellow contestant Tahnee Atkinson for the cycles' live finale. Van Den Dungen received the majority of votes from the jury during the finale, including the votes of Alex Perry, Claudia Navone, Russell James and Priscilla Leighton-Clarke, however, the public voted in favor of Atkinson, who ultimately won the competition.

== Career ==
On 8 July, only one day after the cycle 5 finale of Australia's Next Top Model, it was confirmed that Elite Model Management in New York City and Priscilla's Model Management had offered modelling contracts and immediate representation to Van Den Dungen. It was later reported that Van Den Dungen had turned down the prestigious contracts to stay in Sunbury with her boyfriend, Brad Saul.

Since being back in Australia, Cassi became the face of Portmans shot by Vogue photographer Nicole Bentley and has shot three editorials for Cleo magazine, Madison with photographer Carlotta Moye and one with Oyster magazine with photographer Liz Ham.

In June 2010, Van Den Dungen was the face of Myer as one of the young faces for their upcoming spring/summer campaign. In October 2010, she appeared in an editorial for issue #36 of Russh magazine and was featured in Ellery’s Spring/Summer 2010/2011 campaign, Horreurscope.

In February 2013, Cassi travelled to Europe to walk in London Fashion Week, where she booked a show for Giles Deacon. A week later in March, she was in Paris where she walked the Fall 2013 Miu Miu show. That same month, Van Den Dungen appeared in a 16-page editorial for Australian Vogue. In September, Van Den Dungen walked as an exclusive for Calvin Klein Collection at New York Fashion Week. The next month, she was featured on the cover of Japan's SPUR magazine and in editorials for Japanese Harper's Bazaar and Madame Figaro.

In April 2014, Van Den Dungen's thin body caused controversy. Designer Alex Perry, whose show she walked in and who had previously supported her early career, said that "he recoiled" from the images of Van Den Dungen on the runway, and described casting her in his show as "a serious lapse of judgment". After walking for Honor at Spring/Summer 2015 New York Fashion Week and for Anya Hindmarch and Antonio Berardi at the SS15 London Fashion Week, Van Den Dungen was shown on the cover of Elle Argentina, following an earlier editorial in the March 2014 Australian edition.

In May 2016, Van Den Dungen walked for Toni Maticevski at Australian Fashion Week, her first runway appearance at the event since 2014. She was also featured in a lookbook for Alex Perry's 2017 resort collection later that year, continuing their working relationship on seemingly amicable terms. The model made two guest appearances on the tenth cycle of Australia's Next Top Model.

== Personal life ==
While filming Australia's Next Top Model, Van Den Dungen revealed that she was engaged to a 25-year-old bricklayer, Brad Saul, and had been living with him for a few months. Their son Drake was born in September 2011.
