= Australia's Next Top Model season 5 =

Australia's Next Top Model
- Season 5
- Judges: Sarah Murdoch; Alex Perry; Charlotte Dawson; Jez Smith
- No. of contestants: 13
- Winner: Tahnee Atkinson
- No. of episodes: 11

Release
- Original network: Fox8
- Original release: 28 April – 7 July 2009

Season chronology
- ← Previous; Season 4 Next → Season 6

The fifth season of Australia's Next Top Model premiered on 28 April 2009 on Fox8. Auditions were held during October and November 2008 across Australia, and production of the prerecorded episodes began in January 2009 and concluded in March 2009. Model and television personality Sarah Murdoch took over as the host for this season, replacing Jodhi Meares, and joining incumbent judges Alex Perry and Charlotte Dawson. Harper's Bazaar, Cosmopolitan and Maybelline replaced the previous season's regular sponsors, Vogue and Napoleon Perdis.

The prizes for this season included a one-year modelling contract with Priscilla's Model Management in Sydney, a A$25,000 trip for two to New York City paid by Maybelline, a position as the face of Maybelline’s new colour collection, an eight-page spread in Harper's Bazaar Australia and A$20,000 courtesy of U by Kotex.

The winner of the competition was 17-year-old Tahnee Atkinson from North Fremantle, Western Australia.

== Season summary ==
=== Requirements ===
Like in the previous two seasons, all contestants had to be aged 16 or older to be eligible for the show. Those auditioning were required to have a minimum height of at least 172 centimetres (68 in) tall. To qualify, all applicants had to be Australian citizens residing in Australia. Additional requirements stated that contestants should not have had prior experience as a model in a national campaign within the last five years. If a contestant was represented by an agent or a manager, she had to terminate that representation prior to the competition.

== Cast ==
=== Contestants ===
(Ages stated are at start of contest.)

Contestant	Age	Height	Hometown	Finish	Place
Laura Tyrie	18	170 cm (5 ft 7 in)	Willetton	Episode 1	13
Leah Johnsen	18	173 cm (5 ft 8 in)	Oakleigh	Episode 2	12
Georgie Kidman	16	177 cm (5 ft 9 1/2 in)	Castlemaine	Episode 3	11
Mikarla Hussey	18	172 cm (5 ft 7 1/2 in)	Wollongong	Episode 4	10–9
Eloise Hoile	20	180 cm (5 ft 11 in)	Glenunga	Episode 4	10–9
Madison Wall	17	173 cm (5 ft 8 in)	Wurtulla	Episode 5	8
Laura Mitchell	20	176 cm (5 ft 9 1/2 in)	Ocean Reef	Episode 6	7
Lola Van Vorst	20	181 cm (5 ft 11 1/2 in)	Newport	Episode 7	6
Franky Okpara	18	180 cm (5 ft 11 in)	Wanneroo	Episode 8	5
Adele Thiel	18	181 cm (5 ft 11 1/2 in)	Hornsby	Episode 9	4
Clare Venema	16	177 cm (5 ft 9 1/2 in)	Bridgewater	Episode 10	3
Cassi Van Den Dungen	16	175 cm (5 ft 9 in)	Sunbury	Episode 11	2
Tahnee Atkinson	16	174 cm (5 ft 8 1/2 in)	North Fremantle	Episode 11	1

=== Judges ===
- Sarah Murdoch (host)
- Charlotte Dawson
- Alex Perry

=== Other cast members ===
- Jonathan Pease – style director, model mentor

== Episodes ==
No. overall	No. in season	Title	Original release date
41	1	"A Fashion Baptism of Fire"	28 April 2009
The top thirteen contestants arrived at a surprise A-list press conference and runway show, for Franky was the best performer was granted immunity from elimination. After moving into their new home, the contestants had a couture swimwear photo shoot at Sydney Olympic Park.: Special guests: Charlie Brown, Wayne Cooper, Collette Dinigan, Samantha Downie, Alexandra Girdwood, Lisa Hensley, Jordan Loukas, Demelza Reveley; Featured photographer: Georges Antoni
42	2	"Let's Get Physical"	5 May 2009
The top twelve contestants had a session with a nutritionist to learn about portion sizes and healthy eating before heading to a gym to learn about fitness. This was followed by a gymnastics challenge in which the winner was given the chance to attend the Sydney Ballet with host Sarah Murdoch along with a friend of her choosing. The models later had to pose on a trapeze in a photo shoot for Cosmopolitan, for which the eight best photos would be chosen to run in an editorial for the magazine.: Special guests: Bronwyn McCahon, Dr. Joanna McMillan Price, Dasha Joura, Lucinda Dunn, Aisha Ashe; Featured photographer: Ellen Dahl
43	3	"Makeover Meltdown"	12 May 2009
The top eleven contestants received makeovers and met Maybelline makeup artist Nigel Stanislaus for a makeup lesson. They were then challenged to perform in a commercial for Maybelline with lines of their own, and drama ensued after Lola stole one of Cassi's lines. For the photo shoot, the models were photographed in simplistic beauty shots to showcase their natural beauty.: Special guests: Joh Bailey, Nigel Stanislaus, Michael Joy; Featured photographer: Bec Parsons
44	4	"Runway Hell"	19 May 2009
The top ten contestants received a runway lesson from Mink Sadowsky. They were later sent to a fruit market, and had to walk on the back of a truck in front of market workers to win a shopping spree valued at $10,000. For the photo shoot the contestants had to pose in a campaign for U by Kotex, with the best photo being chosen as one of the brands new advertisements.: Special guests: Mink Sadowsky, Monty Noble, Joh Bailey; Featured photographer: Kane Skennar
45	5	"Diamonds and the Desert"	26 May 2009
After a fake farm photo shoot that tested their professionalism, the top eight contestants were challenged to pose with props made of ice while wearing Cerrone Jewellery. The winner of the challenge received an 18 carat $2,000 necklace, and as a result of mounting stress, Cassi contemplated leaving the competition. The contestants later travelled to South Australia, where they visited the remote town of Parachilna for a lingerie photo shoot in the Outback with photographer Russell James.: Special guests: Justin Spittle, Phillip Boon, Reuben Dabrow; Featured photographer: Russell James
46	6	"Cruising the Catwalk"	2 June 2009
The top seven contestants were taken to the offices of Harper's Bazaar to learn more about fashion trends and styling, and participated in a casting challenge for judge Alex Perry and one of his consultants to attend his upcoming show on board the Queen Mary 2. The contestants later received visits from their mothers, before having a photo shoot on a rickety pylon for Chanel.: Special guests: Claudia Navone; Featured photographer: Richard Freeman
47	7	"Media Virgins"	9 June 2009
The top six contestants were briefed on dealing with the media spotlight, and had a challenge for V Australia in which they had to learn a variety of lines to promote the newest Virgin Airline. The photo shoot had the contestants jumping from a trampoline, with the photos from the shoot to be auctioned off on the Australia's Next Top Model website to help support Fashion Targets Breast Cancer. They later attended Hugos Lounge for a Fashion Targets Breast Cancer charity event, and had to model the outfits they wore at the photo shoot to encourage fashion A-Listers to bid on their gowns.: Special guests: Ruby Rose, Mink Sadowsky; Featured photographers: Denis Montalbetti, Gay Campbell
48	8	"Tears and Emotion"	16 June 2009
The top five contestants arrived at the National Institute of Dramatic Art for an acting lesson and had an audition for a nationwide Telstra commercial. For the photo shoot the contestants were taken to Fox Studios, where they had to pose with Ford models from different decades as they portrayed various corresponding style icons.: Special guests: Sharon Zhai, Mark Gaal, Ana Maria Belo, Adrian Hayward, Chantal Walker; Featured photographer: Paul Westlake
49	9	"London's Calling"	23 June 2009
The top four contestants were flown to London and met former Britain's Next Top Model judge Gerry DeVeaux for a shopping tour of the city, before being introduced to supermodel Elle Macpherson. They later had go-sees with agents at Storm Model Management and Premier Model Management, before taking part in a sight-seeing photo shoot in the streets of London, and travelling back to Australia for elimination.: Special guests: Gerry DeVeaux, Elle Macpherson, Sarah Doukas, Anthony Gordon, Carole White, Alice Burdeu; Featured photographer: Robert Astley Sparke
50	10	"The Final Three"	30 June 2009
The top three contestants met Priscilla Leighton-Clarke and Sarah Murdoch at Priscilla’s Model Management, and were told that they would be attending castings for Australian Fashion Week. The best performer was rewarded with a trip to Broome. The contestants later arrived at Garie Beach, Royal National Park for a photo shoot session with Jez Smith in which they had to work both individually and as a team. At panel, the judges decided on who are the final two that would advance into the live finale.: Special guests: Wayne Cooper, Nicola Finetti, Doll Wright, Kim Marks, Priscilla Leighton-Clarke; Featured photographer: Jez Smith
51	11	"Live Finale"	7 July 2009
The eliminated contestants returned and later reunited with the final two in a runway show. The finalists then had a look back at their individual journey throughout the season. The judges cast their votes for each of the finalists, and after adding the fan vote to the judge's vote, Tahnee was crowned as the fifth winner of Australia's Next Top Model.: Special guests: Jessica Mauboy, Russell James, Claudia Navone, Priscilla Leighton-Clarke, Ruby Rose, Brüno, Tiaan Williams, Alice Burdeu

== Results ==
=== Elimination table ===
Order	Episodes										
Order	1	2 (Note: In episode 2, there were two separate rewards. Clare won the first individually, and won the second as a group with Adele, Cassi, Franky, Georgie, Laura, Madison, Mikarla, and Tahnee.)	3	4 (Note: Episode 4 featured a double elimination with the bottom three contestants being in danger of elimination. There were two separate rewards this episode; Tahnee won the first and Franky won the second.)	5	6	7	8	9	10	11
1	Franky	Laura M.	Tahnee	Adele	Clare	Adele	Tahnee	Clare	Clare	Tahnee	Tahnee
2	Cassi	Cassi	Eloise	Franky	Adele	Clare	Clare	Tahnee	Cassi	Cassi	Cassi
3	Tahnee	Clare	Cassi	Tahnee	Tahnee	Tahnee	Cassi	Cassi	Tahnee	Clare	
4	Eloise	Franky	Clare	Madison	Cassi	Lola	Adele	Adele	Adele		
5	Clare	Mikarla	Franky	Lola	Franky	Cassi	Franky	Franky			
6	Mikarla	Adele	Laura M.	Laura M.	Lola	Franky	Lola				
7	Lola	Tahnee	Lola	Clare	Laura M.	Laura M.					
8	Madison	Madison	Adele	Cassi	Madison						
9	Laura M.	Lola	Madison	Eloise; Mikarla							
10	Georgie	Eloise	Mikarla	Eloise; Mikarla							
11	Leah	Georgie	Georgie								
12	Adele	Leah									
13	Laura T.										

The contestant was immune from elimination
The contestant was eliminated
The contestant won the competition

== Summaries ==
=== Bottom two ===
Episode	Contestants	Eliminated
1	Adele & Laura T.	Laura T.
2	Georgie & Leah	Leah
3	Georgie & Mikarla	Georgie
4	Cassi, Eloise & Mikarla	Eloise
4	Cassi, Eloise & Mikarla	Mikarla
5	Laura M. & Madison	Madison
6	Franky & Laura M.	Laura M.
7	Franky & Lola	Lola
8	Adele & Franky	Franky
9	Adele & Tahnee	Adele
10	Cassi & Clare	Clare
11	Cassi & Tahnee	Cassi

The contestant was eliminated after her first time in the bottom two
The contestant was eliminated after her second time in the bottom two
The contestant was eliminated after her third time in the bottom two
The contestant was eliminated in the final judging and placed as the runner-up

=== Average call-out order ===
Final two is not included.

Rank by average	Place	Model	Call-out total	Number of call-outs	Call-out average
1		Tahnee	27	10	2.70
2	3	Clare	29	10	2.90
3	2	Cassi	34	10	3.40
4	5	Franky	33	8	4.12
5	4	Adele	42	9	4.67
6	7	Laura M.	36	6	6.00
7	9–10	Eloise	25	4	6.25
8	6	Lola	44	7	6.28
9	8	Madison	37	5	7.40
10	9–10	Mikarla	30	4	7.50
11		Georgie	32	3	10.67
12		Leah	23	2	11.50
13		Laura T.	13	1	13.00

=== Photoshoot Guide ===
- Episode 1: Swimwear editorial
- Episode 2: Tulle on trapeze
- Episode 3: Natural beauty shots
- Episode 4: U by Kotex
- Episode 5: Lingerie in the desert
- Episode 6: Chanel campaign
- Episode 7: Fashion targets breast cancer
- Episode 8: Portraying celebrity style icons
- Episode 9: London edge
- Episode 10: Raw beauty on the beach

=== Makeovers ===
- Georgie - Katy Perry inspired dark brown long bob
- Eloise - Rachel Hunter inspired loose curls, layered and dyed dark blonde
- Mikarla - Karlie Kloss inspired angled line bob and dyed light blonde
- Madison - Straighten
- Laura M. - Katie Holmes inspired China doll bob
- Lola - Tight waves and dyed brown
- Franky - Halle Berry inspired black pixie cut and hair straighten
- Adele - Lindsay Lohan light red and no bangs
- Clare - Trimmed and layered
- Cassi - Loose waves and layered
- Tahnee - Long brown extensions with chocolate brown lowlights and blonde highlights

=== Final votes ===
Place	Contestant	Final votes								Total votes (Note: Tahnee and Cassi both received a total of four votes during the finale, but the viewers voted in favor of Tahnee. The public vote held a greater weight in terms of percentage, which got Tahnee over the line. The viewer vote totaled fifteen percent of the overall tally, with the remaining eighty-five percent being divided evenly among the seven judges. The final tally thus rounded out to 51.4% for Tahnee and 48.6% for Cassi.)
Place	Contestant	Sarah (Main judge)	Alex (Main judge)	Charlotte (Main judge)	Jonathan (Creative director)	Priscilla (Winner’s agency)	Russell (Photographer)	Claudia (Harper's Bazaar)	Public	Total votes
1	Tahnee									4 (51.4%)
2	Cassi									4 (48.6%)

== Controversies ==
Before the season premiered, there was controversy over a number of issues.

Sixteen-year-old Cassi Van Den Dungen was criticised for being a "proud bogan and smoker" with her mother in support, having to take anger-management classes to control her temper whilst participating in the series, and for being engaged and living with a 25-year-old bricklayer. She also received backlash from Hume City Council mayor Jack Ogilvie over comments in which she described her hometown of Sunbury as "like a ghetto", with the mayor stating that Van Den Dungen was a "very immature, silly little girl" and that "she owes Sunbury an apology. I wonder if she knows what a ghetto is. Sunbury is far from being a ghetto, far from it."

Eighteen-year-old Mikarla Hussey's appearance initially shocked host Sarah Murdoch. In the second episode, a nutritionist assisted the contestants with healthy eating, weight management and lifestyle choices. Mikarla initially weighed 50 kg (110 lb) before production began. After her swimsuit photo shoot showed off her technically unhealthy body, she was forced to put on weight.

Lola Van Vorst was involved in a nude photo scandal, involving pictures taken by an ex-boyfriend.

On 6 June 2009, it was revealed that Clare Venema, Adele Thiel and Tahnee Atkinson had previous professional modelling experience that had not been disclosed during the show.
