= Mercedes-Benz Fashion Festival Sydney 2014 =

Fashion industry event

- Date: 6–10 April 2014
- Location: Sydney, Australia
- Type: Fashion show
- Participants: 70 designers

Mercedes-Benz Fashion Week is an annual fashion industry event held in Sydney, Australia. The event is a part of Australian Fashion Week and has taken place at Carriageworks for two consecutive years. The 2014 event was held from 6 to 10 April. The event focuses on providing Australian designers a platform to connect with a global audience of fashion buyers, press and consumers.

== Overview ==
The industry-only event showcased over 70 designers, including 25 designers from Sydney, four from Melbourne, four from Perth, two from Brisbane and one from Adelaide. There was also one designer each from Bali and China. The 2014 designer showcase featured mostly start-up labels fresh from fashion school. Lan Yu became the first Chinese designer to showcase at Mercedes-Benz Fashion Week Australia.

In 2013, Mercedes-Benz Fashion Week Sydney generated an estimate $4.8 million into the New South Wales economy. It costs between $6000 and $14,500 to secure a show at Fashion Week and can end up exceeding costs of $80,000 when models and all other production costs are factored in. The 2014 event had 20 confirmed buyers from ASOS, Addison Crescent, Browns Fashion, House of Fraser, Harvey Nichols, Nasty Gal, Net-a-Porter and Selfridges. Mercedes-Benz Fashion Week Sydney 2014 also featured an Indigenous Fashion Week at Sydney's Town Hall and also supported the first Mercedes-Benz Fashion Week Weekend Edition which was open to for the public to attend. Mercedes-Benz Fashion Week Sydney 2014 caused a debate about the use of skinny models in runway shows, when Marie Claire editor Jackie Frank called a model's agent to enquire about her health. Featured designer Alex Perry then apologised for his use of extremely thin models in his fashion show. Jackie Frank said that Alex Perry's public apology would help shift body image attitudes in the fashion industry. Vivien’s model Laura Mitchell who walked in fashion week informed the media that most of the shows at the Mercedes-Benz Fashion Week had not been catered and the models were left hungry. In 2008, Sydney Fashion Week said they would focus on promoting healthy body image by using healthier looking models on the catwalk.
