= Mercedes-Benz Fashion Festival Brisbane =

Mercedes-Benz Fashion Festival Brisbane is an annual fashion industry event held in Brisbane, Australia. The Mercedes-Benz Fashion Festival Brisbane began in 2006 and is held over six days in late August of each year. It features the latest spring-summer season collections available in stores. It is one of the most important fashion week events in Australia and the Queensland's premier fashion event.

The event is recognized as the showcase for emerging Queensland fashion designers. It also features some of Australian top designers and their labels and international designers.

Lindsay Bennett is festival director and founder and Mercedes-Benz is the main sponsor.

In 2009, the festival featured 40 designers in 10 Group Shows, opening and closing events, a fashion forum, exhibitions and fashion workshops.

There were national designers such as Alex Perry, Leona Edmiston and Lisa Ho and local designers such as Easton Pearson, Paul Hunt, Juli Grbac, Pia du Pradal, Urbbana Bora and Sacha Drake.

Other Queensland designers featured in the past included Pistols at Dawn, Chelsea de Luca and George Wu.

The 2020 event was cancelled due to the COVID-19 pandemic.
