= Aleyna FitzGerald =

Australian model

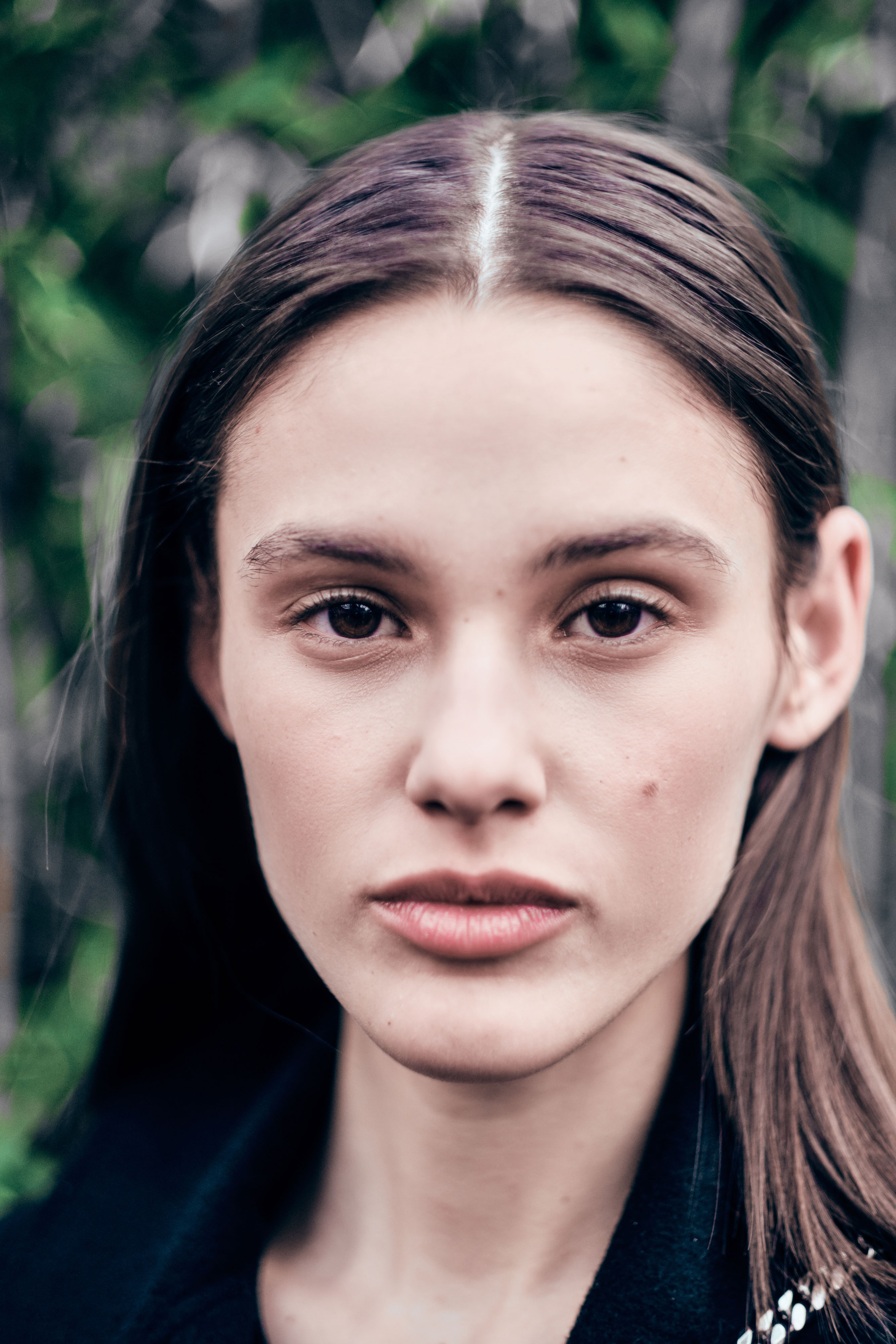
- Born: Aleyna FitzGerald; 4 September 1999 (age 27); Manly, New South Wales, Australia
- Occupation: Model
- Years active: 2016–present
- Modelling information
- Height: 179 cm (5 ft 10 1/2 in)
- Hair colour: Brown
- Eye colour: Brown
- Agency: DNA Model Management (New York); Silent Models (Paris) d'management group (Milan); Premier Model Management (London); View Management (Barcelona); Priscilla's Model Management (Sydney)

Aleyna FitzGerald (born 4 September 1999) is an Australian model best known for being the winner of cycle 10 of Australia's Next Top Model.

== Career ==
In 2016, Fitzgerald was crowned as the winner of cycle 10 of Australia's Next Top Model. The prizes for this cycle included a one-year modelling contract with Priscilla's Model Management in Sydney, a trip to New York City for New York Fashion Week, a Mazda2 Hatch, and an editorial spread in Elle Australia.

In March 2017, Fitzgerald made her catwalk debut walking shows in Paris, such as Saint Laurent, Dior, Valentino, and Sacai. Fitzgerald also closed Giambattista Valli for their Fall 2017 collection. After her debut, she also walked for Balmain and Rodarte and featured in Balmain's Fall/Winter 2017 campaign, lensed by Olivier Rousteing. In September, she walked for houses including Chanel and Valentino at the Spring/Summer 2018 shows. Fitzgerald also featured in an editorial for Australian Harper's Bazaar.

In March 2018, Fitzgerald walked for Balmain and John Galliano in Paris and Emporio Armani and Moschino in Milan, and appeared in Balmain's Spring/Summer 2018 campaign. She then featured in Dolce & Gabbana's Alta Moda show in New York. In August, she appeared in an editorial for Vogue Taiwan.
