= Aurelio Costarella =

Australian fashion designer (1964–2025)

- Born: 1964; Perth, Western Australia, Australia
- Died: 19 April 2025 (aged 60); Perth, Western Australia, Australia
- Occupation: Fashion designer

Aurelio Costarella (1964 – 19 April 2025) was an Australian fashion designer, known for embellishing the demi-couture style.

== Biography ==
Costarella was born in Mount Lawley, Perth, in 1964. His designs became a regular feature at the Australian Fashion Week. His collection was featured at New York Fashion Week in 2006. His designs were stocked by Barneys New York and Harvey Nichols.

His clothing was notably worn by Cate Blanchett, Charlize Theron, Rihanna, Geri Halliwell, Dita Von Teese and Queen Mary of Denmark.

Costarella died due to Creutzfeldt-Jakob disease on 19 April 2025, at the age of 60. He had been an advocate for mental health throughout his life.
