= Wayne Cooper (fashion designer) =

Australian fashion designer

Wayne Cooper is a British-born fashion designer based in Australia.

Cooper grew up in London's East End. Always interested in fashion, he moved to Australia in 1985 and trained in fashion design at East Sydney Technical College while working at the Sydney clothing store, Masons.

Cooper was part of a successful fashion partnership in Sydney for 7 years, before launching his own label 'BRAVE'. In 1996 the signature line 'WAYNE COOPER' was added to the 'BRAVE' label, and in 2002 the lot was replaced by the 'WAYNE' label. He has shown for the past 10 years at Mercedes Australian Fashion Week, and his shows have traditionally featured well known international models, including Amber Valletta, Linda Evangelista, Alek Wek, Sarah O'Hare, Eva Herzigova and Carmen Cass. He regularly shows in Japan, France, the UK and the US.

Cooper was a guest on cycles three, four and five of Australia's Next Top Model.

Cooper has two boutiques located in Melbourne, Australia. His label is also available in selected department stores in Australia and international department stores including Myer.

On 20 June 2008 Cooper was charged by police with assaulting his wife, Sarah Marsh. On 31 October 2008 Cooper pleaded guilty to common assault and was placed on a two-year good behaviour bond after charges of assault occasioning actual bodily harm and intimidation were dropped. Cooper assaulted his wife days after she had cancer surgery.

Cooper has also been criticised by NSW Health due to his willingness to work with tobacco companies.
