= Peter Morrissey =

Australian fashion designer (born 1962)

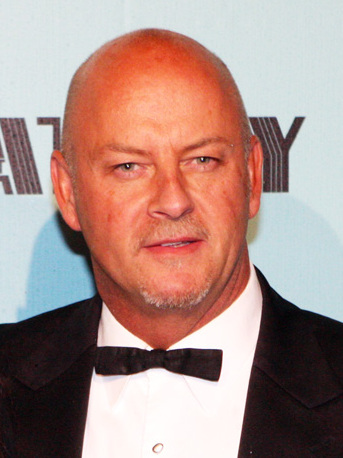
- Morrissey in 2013
- Born: 1962 (age 63–64)
- Occupation: Fashion designer

Peter Morrissey (born 1962) is an Australian fashion designer. He collaborated with Leona Edmiston on the Morrissey Edmiston fashion label for 14 years before founding his own label, Morrissey, in 1997. Following the sale of the label in 2000 to Oroton Group then to M Webster Holdings in 2006, it went defunct in 2009. In 2009, Morrissey began designing clothes for the mass market, before introducing homeware ranges in the 2010s.

== Early life ==
Morrissey was born in 1962. He grew up in the Sutherland Shire with his twin sister and four brothers. He attended school at Our Lady of Fatima in Caringbah and De La Salle College, Cronulla.

== Career ==
Morrissey has been active in the Australian fashion industry since the 1980s. He worked with fellow designer Leona Edmiston on their Morrissey Edmiston fashion label for 14 years. The pair's partnership ended acrimoniously in 1997.

After their split, Morrissey formed his eponymous fashion label in 1997 and enjoyed renewed success. Millionaire Rene Rivkin supported Morrissey by buying a 60% stake in the label. Rivkin sold the Morrissey business to Oroton Group in 2000 which in turn sold it to M Webster Holdings in 2006. M Webster Holdings closed the business down in February 2009 due to the economic downturn. Morrissey reacquired businesses and trademarks related to his name from M Webster Holdings in 2011.

Morrissey designed costumes for the 'Arrivals' segment of the 2000 Summer Olympics opening ceremony. The segment featured five large floats and performers representing the arrival of people from different continents; Morrissey designed costumes for the Oceania performers.

GQ Australia named Morrissey 'Man of the Year – Designer' in 2002, while FHM bestowed the same title in 2003 and 2004. Cleo named Morrissey 'Cleo Maybelline Designer of the Year' in 2004.

Qantas engaged Morrissey to design its uniforms in 2003. The uniforms featured the Wirriyarra print by Indigenous-owned design agency Balarinji and were used until 2013. Morrissey also designed the complimentary business class pyjamas provided from 2007 to 2016. He also acted as a mentor for the airline's Spirit of Youth Awards. This mentoring relationship ceased in 2009. Morrissey also designed uniforms for McDonald's, Novotel and OPSM.

In 2009, Morrissey worked with Bruno Schiavi to introduce a budget fashion range for Big W. He was a judge on the fourth season of Project Runway Australia which premiered in October 2012.

Early in 2013, Morrissey launched the Home by Peter Morrissey home wares range available exclusively in Big W department stores throughout Australia.

In 2025, Morrissey designed the school uniforms for Salesian College, a private boys school in Melbourne.

== Personal life ==
Morrissey was treated for a cerebral aneurysm in June 2009. He stayed in the hospital for four months following the surgery.
