= Showpo =

Australian online fashion retailer

- Industry: Online Retail, Fashion, Clothing, Shoes
- Headquarters: Sydney, New South Wales, Australia
- Key people: Jane Lu (CEO)
- Products: Clothes, Shoes and Accessories
- Revenue: US$ 30 million (2017)
- Website: https://www.showpo.com

Showpo is an Australian online fashion retailer. Primarily aimed at young women. As of June 2017, Showpo's annual revenue was $30 million, with 35% of sales occurring internationally.

Showpo's CEO Jane Lu has described the company's social media branding as its "biggest competitive advantage". As of May 2017, the company had 1.1 million followers on Instagram and 895,100 Likes on Facebook.

== History ==
In 2010, Showpo was launched as "Show Pony" by co-founder Jane Lu, initially operating from her parents' garage in Balmain, Sydney. Three months after launch, the company opened a bricks and mortar store in Broadway in Sydney, followed by a kiosk in Pitt St Westfield in August 2011. In 2012, Showpo had its first million-dollar month with just four staff. Showpo closed its profitable bricks and mortar stores in 2013 to focus its business solely online. In 2014, the company turned over $10 million in sales and by 2017 it had reached a run rate of $30 million.

== Showpo International ==
In August 2017, Showpo held its official US launch in Los Angeles, the location of its US warehouse.
