= Ulla Johnson =

American designer

- Born: Manhattan, New York, United States
- Education: University of Michigan
- Occupations: fashion designer, brand owner
- Known for: Ulla Johnson luxury women's fashion brand
- Website: https://ullajohnson.com/

Ulla Johnson is an American designer and owner of the eponymous clothing brand.

== Early life and education ==
Her mother is Serbian and her father Danish; they are both archaeologists who met on a dig in Yugoslavia. Johnson was born and raised in Yorkville, Manhattan, and attended Bronx Science. At the University of Michigan she obtained dual degrees in psychology and women's studies. As a child she moved around so much with her archaeologist parents, including digs in Iran and Germany, that she described herself a global nomad. Her mother collected local textiles and jewelry, which started a life-long interest in traditional crafts.

== Career ==
Johnson started the brand in 1999 in Manhattan, New York, immediately after her graduation. Johnson founded her line with five tailored separates and a self-funded $5000. Her first big break was in 2000 when Barney's bought her collection, leading to a long association; Barney's threw a party to honor her in 2016. In 2014, the brand held its first seasonal presentation during New York Fashion Week. In February 2017, the format changed to runway shows. She has shown in iconic New York cultural institutions including Four Freedoms Park on Roosevelt Island, Lincoln Center, the New York Public Library, and the Brooklyn Museum’s Beaux-Arts Court.

In 2017, Johnson opened her first boutique in New York City. In 2019, the second New York store, Ulla Johnson Amagansett, was opened.

The Ulla Johnson aesthetic has been described as free spirited, transportive and feminine. It caters to an urbanized bohemian bourgeois clientele. Ulla Johnson collections are stocked globally in many of the world's most prestigious retailers including Bergdorf Goodman, Neiman Marcus, and Le Bon Marche, among others.

Johnson has invested in her supply chain, working with artisans and craftspeople from Peru, Kenya, India, Uruguay, the Philippines and Africa. Johnson feels that this approach is not only about authenticity and beauty but also about economic empowerment for often female led rural communities.

In 2018, Johnson collaborated with Los Angeles-based designer Garrett Leight on an eyewear collection.

In 2019, Johnson collaborated with Bobbi Brown, a collection which sold out. A second collection launched in 2021.

In 2019, Johnson partnered with landscape architect Miranda Brooks on a planting scheme to front Johnsons store in Amagansett. Miranda also created the gardens of Johnsons homes in Brooklyn and Montauk.

In 2020, Johnson joined forces with architect Rafael de Cárdenas to design and build the 2100 sq ft showroom of her brand in New York. It is located on Lafayette Street, near her SoHo studio.

In February 2021, Johnson announced the launch of premium denim, part of its Fall 22 collection. Handcrafted in Los Angeles, using sustainable practices.

Johnson's philanthropic work is focused in its support of women's advocacy, social justice, the preservation of craft, and environmental conservation.

== Personal ==
Ulla Johnson lives in Brooklyn with her husband and three children. She works at her company's headquarters in SoHo.
