= Amanda Ware =

Australian model (born 1992)

- Born: Amanda Ware; 1 June 1992 (age 34); Mermaid Beach, Queensland
- Modeling information
- Height: 5 ft 9.5 in (1.77 m)
- Hair color: Brown
- Eye color: Brown
- Agency: Priscilla's Model Management; Elite Model Management

Amanda Ware (born 1 June 1992) is an Australian model, best known for being the winner of cycle 6 of Australia's Next Top Model.

== Career ==
As winner of Australia's Next Top Model, Cycle 6, Ware was due to appear on the cover of Harper's Bazaar Australia, but the magazine editor decided to publish half the November issue with Ware and half with the runner-up, Kelsey Martinovich, who was incorrectly announced as the winner by host Sarah Murdoch. During the course of the show Ware won a campaign with Bonds as well as a campaign with Levi's that was included in her prize. In 2010 she signed a three-year contract with Elite Model Management in New York City after a successful one week visit. In August 2011 Ware ended her contract with Elite and signed with S Models.

For her runway debut at New York Fashion Week Fall 2011, Ware walked for a total of 6 shows that included Phillip Lim, L'Wren Scott, and Chado Ralph Rucci.

In her first full season, Ware walked for a total of 17 shows. At New York Fashion Week Spring/Summer 2012, she walked for BCBG by Max Azria, Carlos Miele, Hervé Léger, Monique Lhuillier, L'Wren Scott and Ruffian. At London Fashion Week Spring/Summer 2012, she walked at Antonio Berardi, Clements Ribeiro, Nicole Farhi, Marios Schwab and Pringle of Scotland. At Paris Fashion Week Spring/Summer 2012, she walked at Luis Buchinho, Lie Sang Bong, Andrew Gn, Kenzo, Leonard and Atsuro Tayama.

== Early life ==
Ware was Captain of Miami State High School, and finished year twelve in 2009. She then worked as a waitress in Mermaid Surf Club and studied exercise science and education at Griffith University. Ware's hobbies include pilates, surfing, tennis and touch football.

Preceded by Tahnee Atkinson	Australia's Next Top Model winner Cycle 6 (2010)	Succeeded by Montana Cox
