= Camilla and Marc =

Australian fashion label

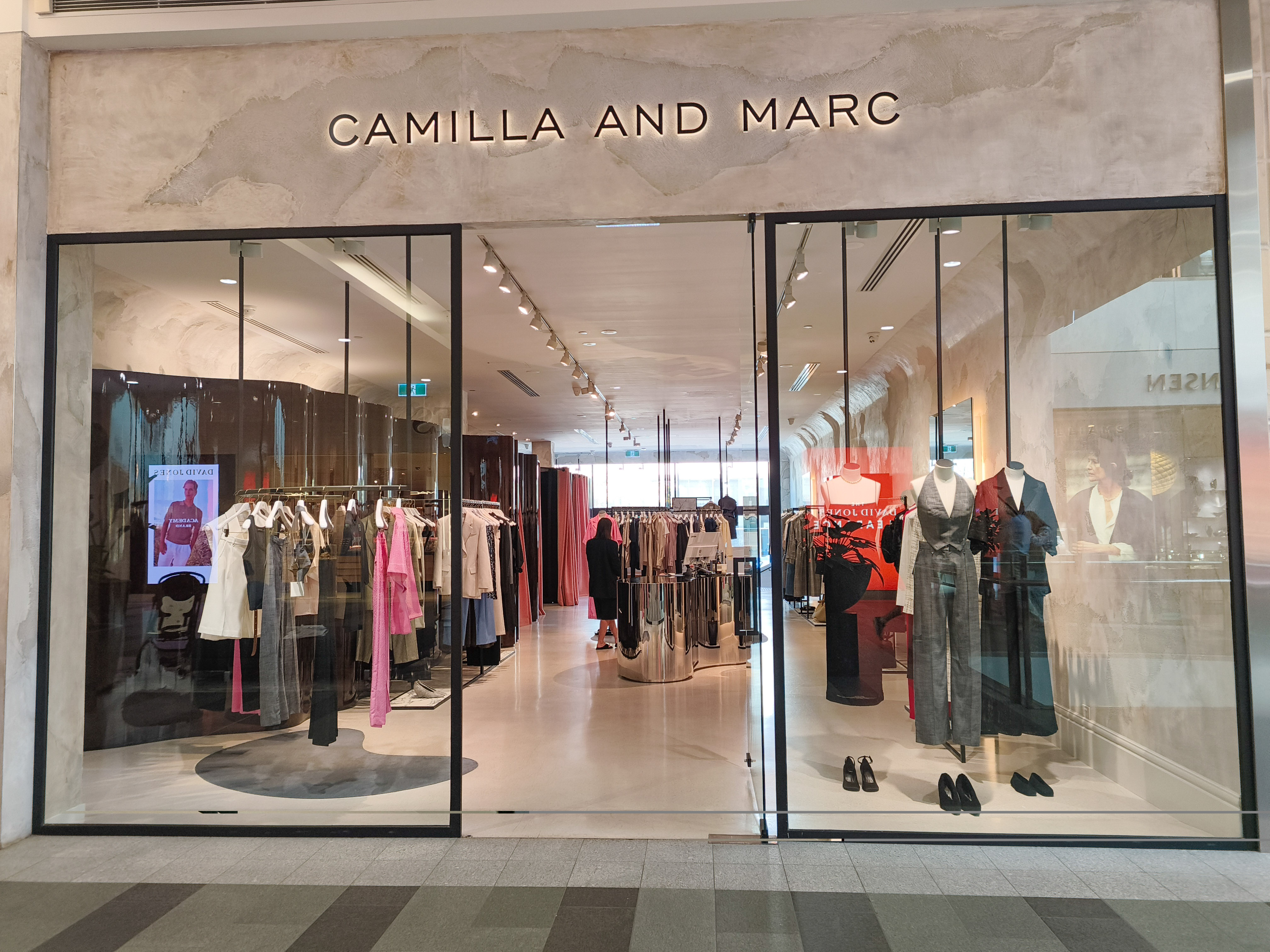
- Camilla and Marc boutique at Claremont Quarter
- Type: Private
- Industry: Fashion
- Founded: 2003
- Founder: Marc Freeman; Camilla Freeman-Topper
- Headquarters: Sydney, Australia
- Area served: International
- Website: camillaandmarc.com

Camilla and Marc is an Australian women's fashion label launched in 2003 at Australian Fashion Week by Sydney based brother and sister Camilla Freeman-Topper and Marc Freeman. Its style has been described as masculine tailoring with feminine silhouettes. Vogue Australia defined the brand hallmarks as a combination of luxurious fabrics, colourful prints and eccentric details.

== History ==
Camilla Freeman-Topper (born 1981) studied fashion at Whitehouse Institute of Design, Sydney, before winning a scholarship and spending a further year training at Accademia italiana in Florence, Italy. Marc Freeman (born 1979) trained in engineering and a masters of commerce at University of New South Wales before they started the brand together. Freeman manages the brand and business, while Freeman-Topper focuses on design.

In 2007, Camilla and Marc launched a swimwear range, known as C&M Camilla and Marc Swim. Two years later, its first store opened in the Sydney suburb of Paddington, followed by a further store in Melbourne and an e-commerce site. In August 2012, the brand launched a C&M Camilla and Marc off duty line. Designed as a 'little sister' to the main brand, it included a full range at a lower price, including denim and swimwear, designed to appeal to a younger audience.

In 2013, the label's 10th anniversary, Camilla and Marc was chosen to open the show at Australian Fashion Week. In 2014, a second Sydney store at Fiveways opened, enabling the first Sydney store to focus on retailing the diffusion line. A footwear line was announced for launch in late 2014.

In 2018, the brand was the first shown again at the Australian Fashion Week.

Camilla and Marc expansion plans in Australia continue with 5 stores opening across the country over the past few years – and with three more boutiques set to open by end of 2018. This growth has been complemented by a strong emergence in the US and international markets.

Renowned for their quality finishes and luxury design Camilla and Marc opened their first boutique in Paddington in 2009. In 2014, they opened their second store in Fiveways and a third in Mosman in December 2015. Following on from this momentum, the brand opened Emporium in the Melbourne central business district in July 2016, joining their Armadale store in Melbourne's inner city suburbs. The Strand boutique in the Sydney central business district opened its doors in April 2017. Further in 2017, an outlet in Rosebery opened and 2018 has seen the opening of their first boutique in Perth at Claremont Quarter.

With a strong following by international industry forerunners such as US InStyle Editor Laura Brown and stylist Vanessa Traina, the brand's local awareness in the US has developed exponentially. In May 2018, Camilla and Marc opened MBFWA to coincide with the label's 15th anniversary. The show garnered international attention and was widely well received as a triumphant celebration of their 15 years in the business. 60 tonnes of sand were used to create a Dystopian Australian landscape, exploring themes of futurism, reflection and light within the collection.

In 2021, the Armadale brand store was refurbished and redesigned to focus on creating a more intimate setting, featuring an earthy palette and strong geometric shapes.

The company opened it first store in South Australia in July 2025.

== International following ==
UK newspaper The Observer described Camilla and Marc as a brand to watch in July 2013. The brand has been exporting since its second season. International stockists include Saks Fifth Avenue, Net-a-Porter and Intermix, New York. High-profile wearers of the brand have included Kate Bosworth, Kirsten Dunst, Rose Byrne and Kristen Stewart.

== Gallery ==
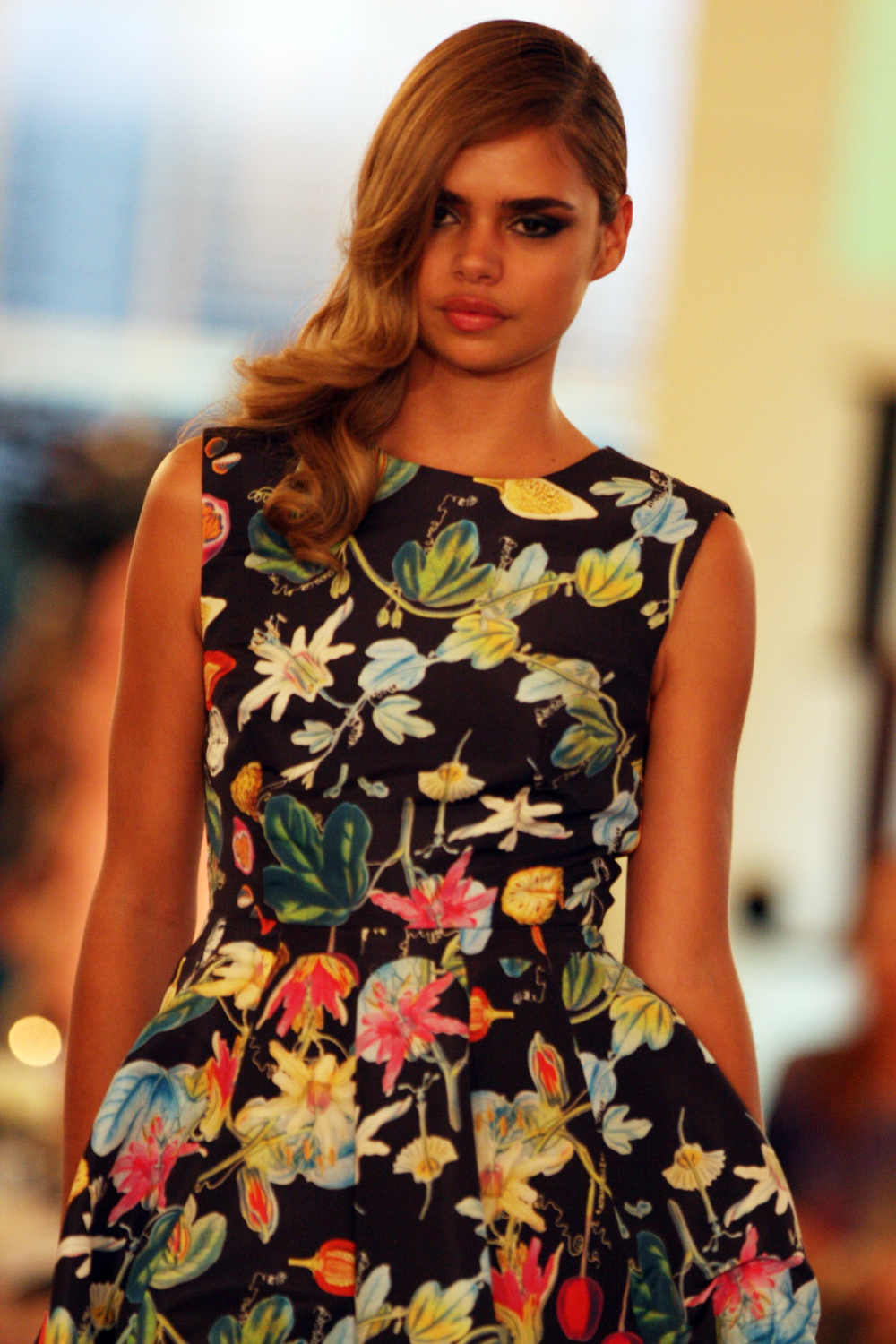
Samantha Harris in C&M, 2012

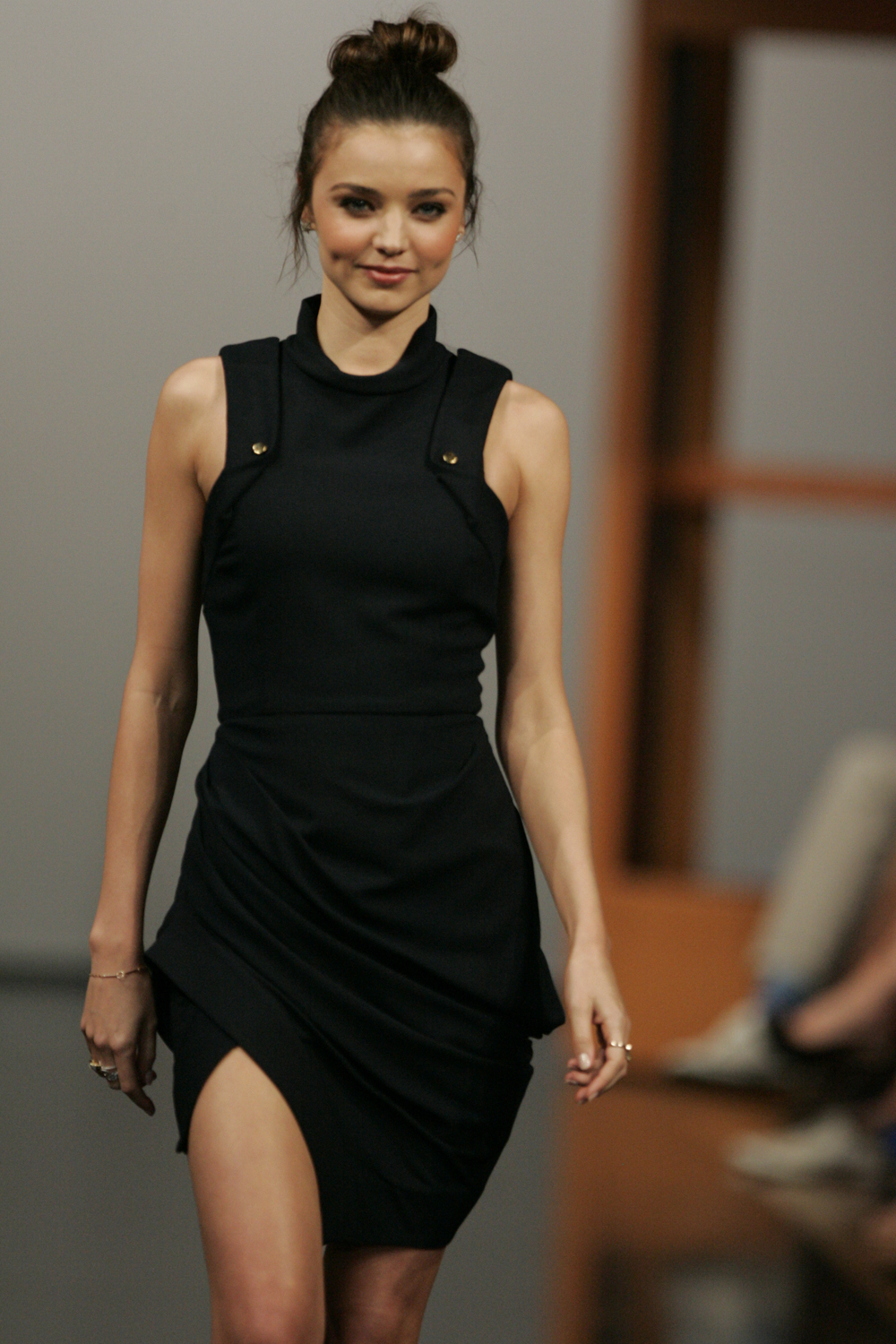
Miranda Kerr in C&M, 2013

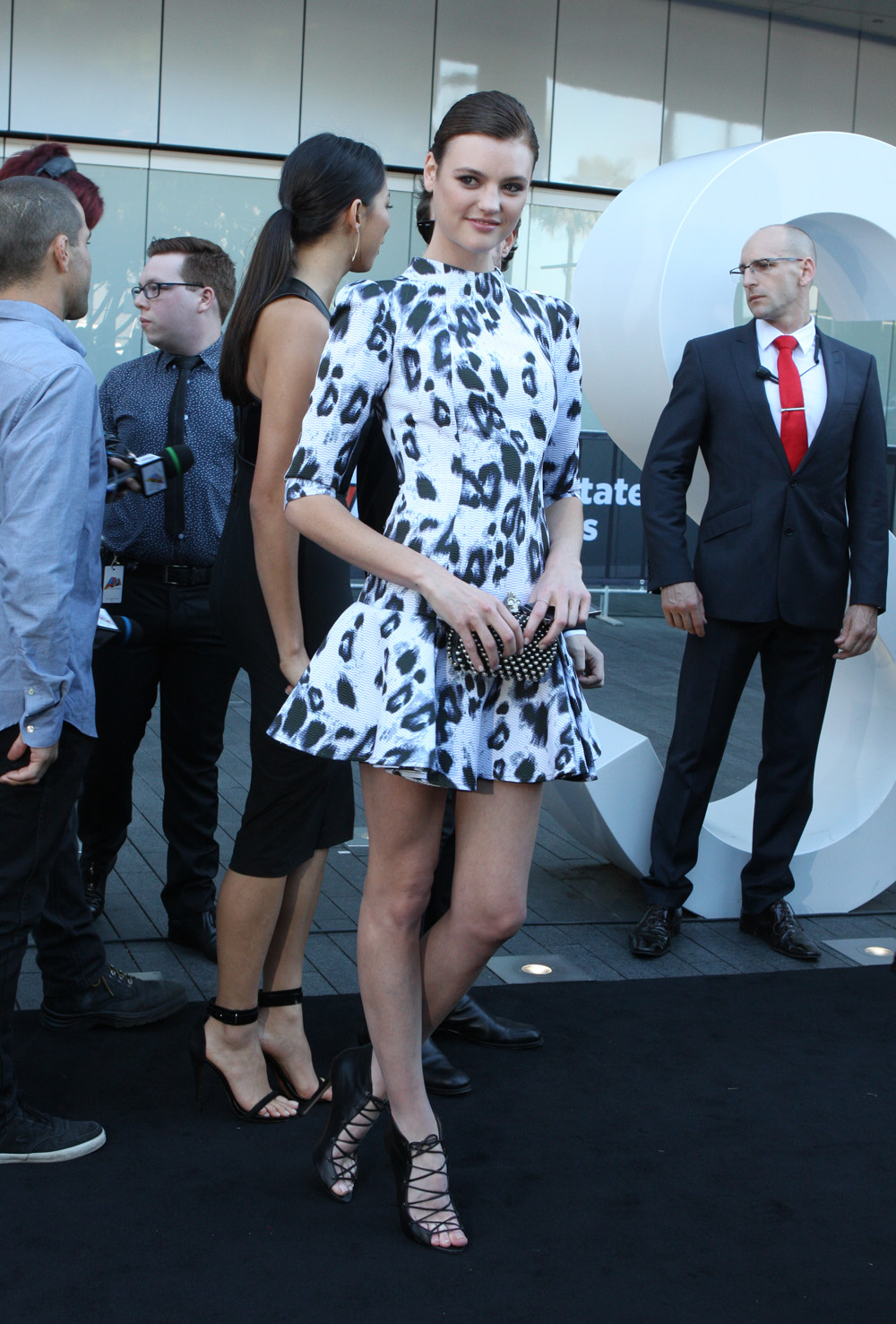
Montana Cox in C&M, 2013

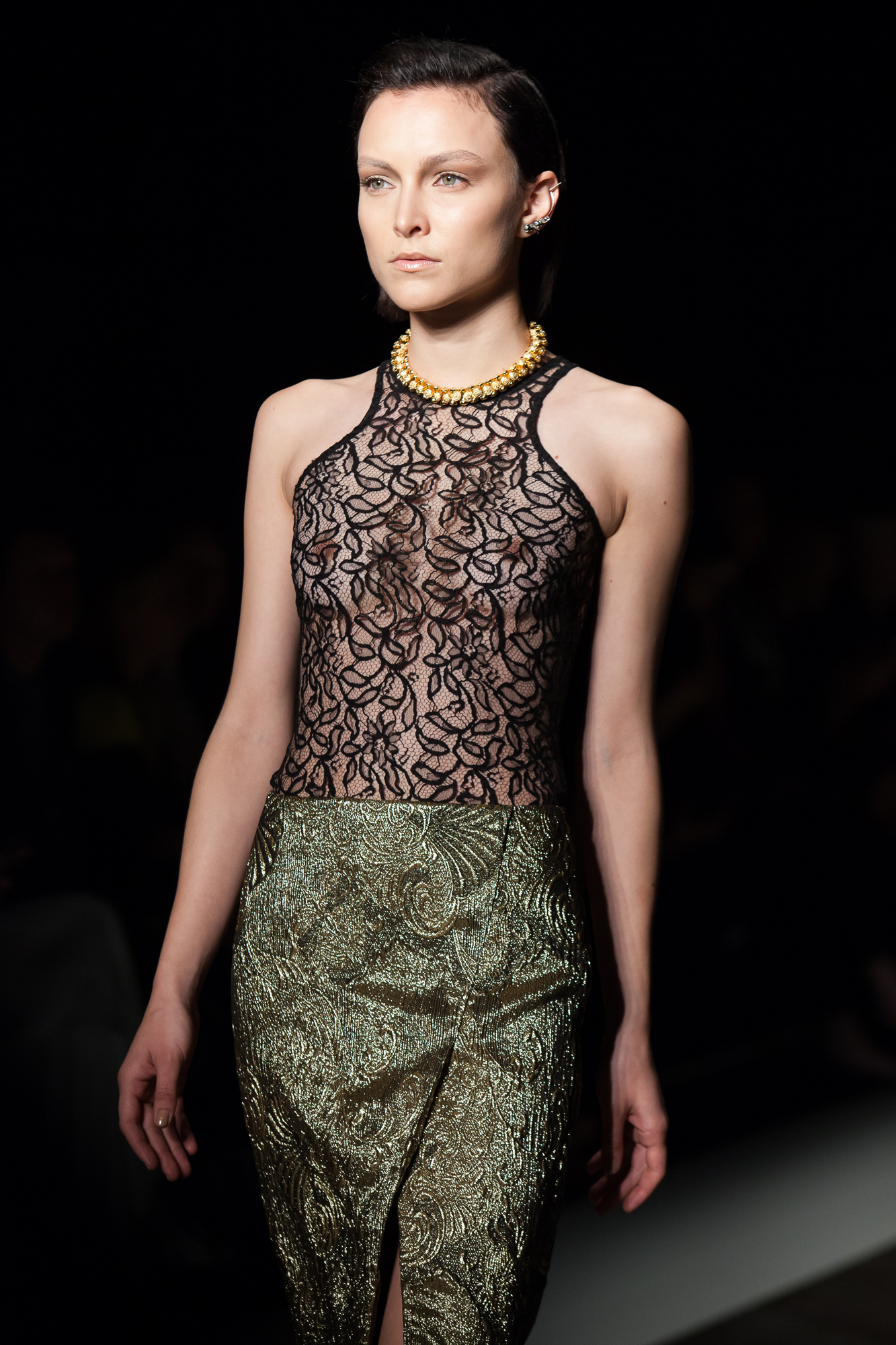
C&M opened the show at Australian Fashion Week 2013

== See also ==
- List of companies named after people
