= Leona Edmiston =

Australian fashion designer

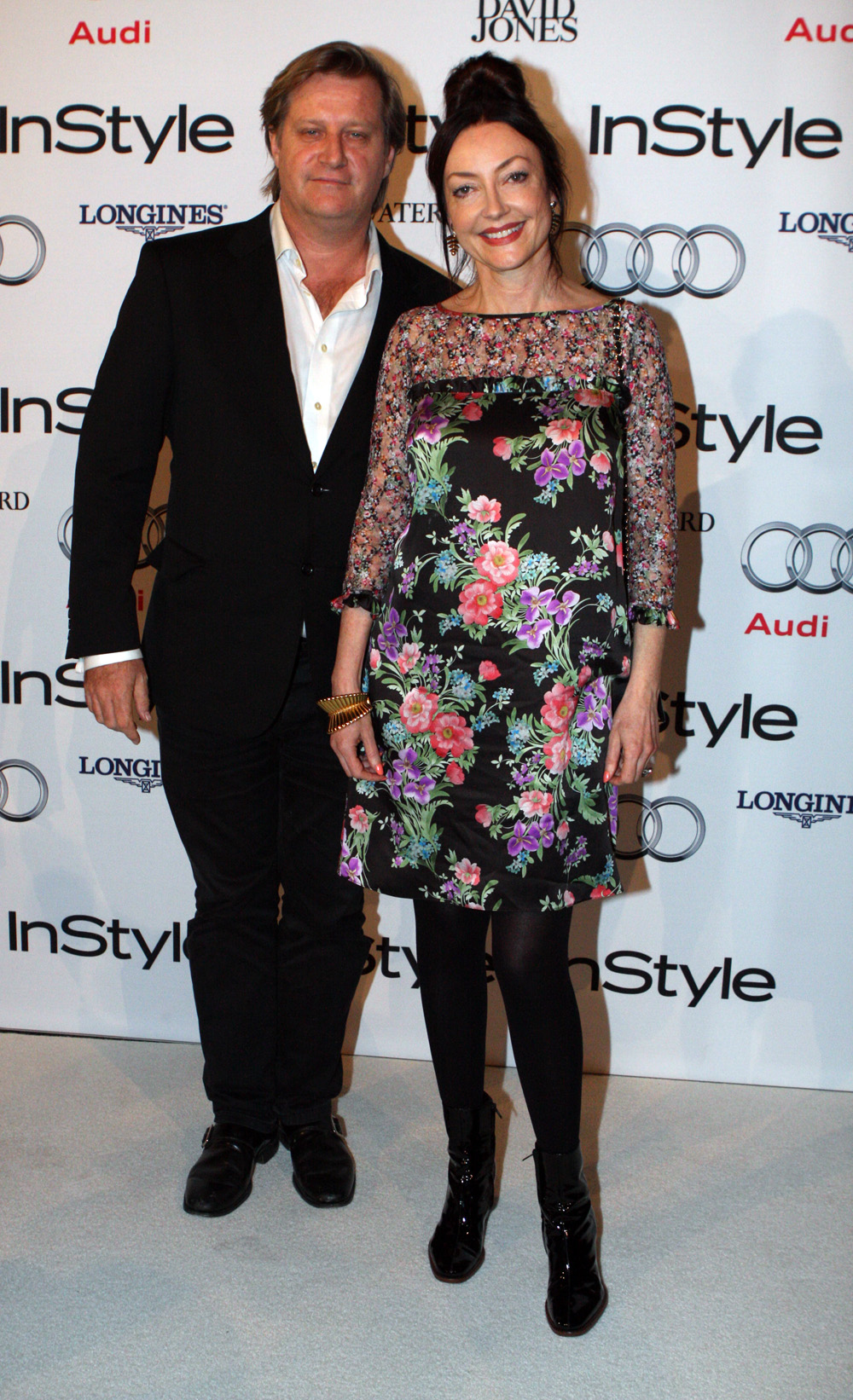
- Edmiston with her husband Jeremy Ducker in 2013
- Education: East Sydney Technical College
- Years active: 1983–present
- Website: www.leonaedmiston.com

Leona Edmiston is an Australian fashion designer based in Sydney.

== Education ==
She studied fashion design at East Sydney Technical College.

== Career ==
She began her first label, called "Morrissey Edmiston", with fellow Australian designer Peter Morrissey in 1983. The label was popular for over 14 years. In 1996, the label split and Edmiston started her solo label, Leona Edmiston with her husband, Jeremy Ducker, in 2001.

Edmiston showed at Mercedes Australian Fashion Week in 2004, 2005, and 2006; while in 2008 and 2009 she conducted private showings off the Fashion Week schedule. Leona Edmiston has stores in Australia (including Myer), US and the UK as well as online.

In 2016, she collaborated with Fancy Feast to enter the lifestyle and homewares market, designing limited edition accessories for cats and their owners.

== Personal ==
Edmiston is married to Jeremy Ducker. In 2012, the couple welcomed twins.
