= Oroton =

Australian fashion brand

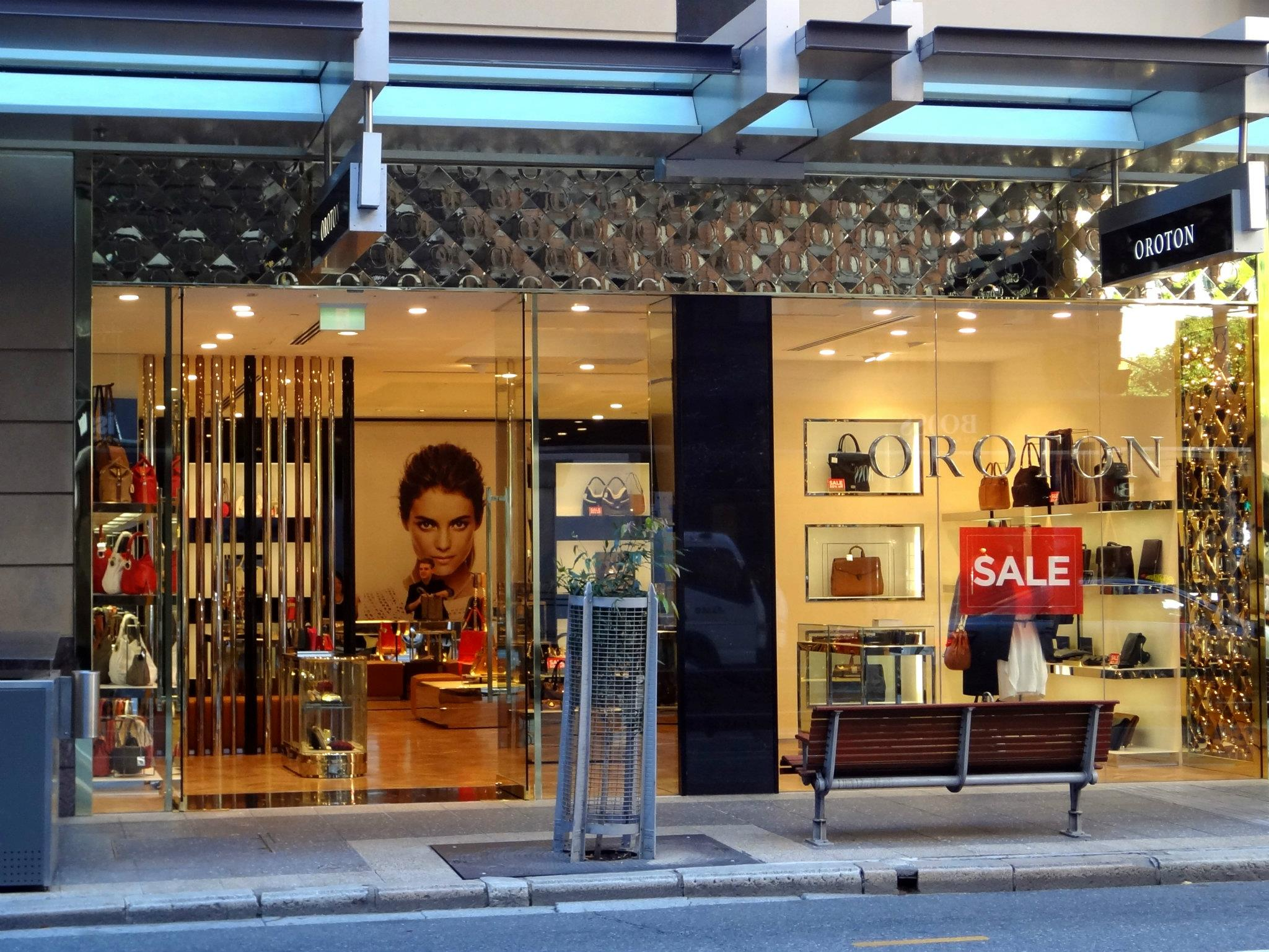
- Oroton store in Brisbane
- Type: Private
- Traded as: ASX: ORL
- Industry: Retail
- Founded: 1938
- Founder: Boyd Lane
- Headquarters: Sydney
- Key people: Peter Halkett (CEO); Sophie Holt (creative director)
- Products: Luxury goods
- Owner: Will Vicars
- Website: oroton.com

Oroton is Australia's oldest luxury fashion company founded in 1938. The company's main product category is leather bags for women and men. The company sells other products such as eyewear, accessories and small leather goods, and launched its ready-to-wear apparel line in 2019. The company is based in Sydney and has close to 50 stores and concessions across Australia and Malaysia.

== History ==
Oroton started as a private company established by Boyd Lane under the name Boyd Lane & Co Pty Ltd.

Oroton revolutionised fashion in Australia in the 1950s by replacing traditional materials used for evening bags with interwoven metallic mesh - a product invented in USA by Whiting and Davis, who invented the machine to do so.› history Oroton was known for its signature mesh evening bags, today selling high-end leather bags and accessories. Many of the early Oroton metal mesh bags and accessories were made in West Germany. In Australia other companies such as Glomesh, Parklane and Sterling mesh using the metal mesh system created major competition with Oroton, with Oroton being the most known name Internationally.

Oroton became a public company under the name Oroton International in 1987.

In 2000, Oroton acquired the Morrissey fashion label. In November 2002, Oroton International purchased the Marcs brand, founded by Mark Keighery, for $22.2 million.

In 2002, the company was renamed the OrotonGroup.

In November 2006, OrotonGroup sold its brands Marcs and Morrissey to M. Webster Holdings for $6.3 million.

In November 2017, Oroton announced it was entering into voluntary administration.

In April 2018, the brand saw a significant increase in sales after Meghan Markle wore an Oroton crossbody bag for an official royal appearance with Prince Harry at London's Commonwealth Heads of Government Meeting.

In July 2018, the company was purchased by Will Vicars for nearly $25 million and re-instated as a private company. Vicars was an Oroton board member and owned 18 per cent of the company prior to the transaction. David Kesby was appointed as CEO.

Sophie Holt was appointed creative director in 2018. In October 2021, Jenny Child, formerly a partner at McKinsey & Company, took over as CEO.

In June 2025, Peter Halkett became CEO.
