= J'Aton Couture =

Melbourne-based couture house

J'Aton Couture is a Melbourne-based couture house, established by Jacob Luppino and Anthony Pittorino in 1995.

== History ==
J'Aton is a Melbourne-based fashion house founded by Jacob Luppino and Anthony Pittorino in Ascot Vale. They draw inspiration from their Italian heritage, and employing traditional techniques.

== Work ==
J'Aton Couture has been recipient of multiple awards, including the 2009 Prix de Marie Claire Awards for Best Eveningwear Designers and numerous Australian Gown of the Year acknowledgments. In addition to private couture requests, the house has created many custom-made evening gowns for local and international red carpets and editorial assignments.

Many high-profile women have worn the label including Tina Arena, Dita von Teese, Charlize Theron, Kylie Minogue and Dannii Minogue, Melissa George, Delta Goodrem, Lily Cole and Keisha Whitaker.

== Destruction of studio ==
On 10 December 2008, the label's atelier above the Greville Street showroom caught fire. The resulting damage to the premises was estimated to be worth $300,000 while it was estimated by the designers that the twenty evening gowns destroyed in the fire were worth $400,000 to 500,000. The substantial financial loss and the event of the fire and clean-up itself, forced the designers to delay J'Aton Couture's move to New York.
