= Tahnee Atkinson =

Australian model (born 1992)

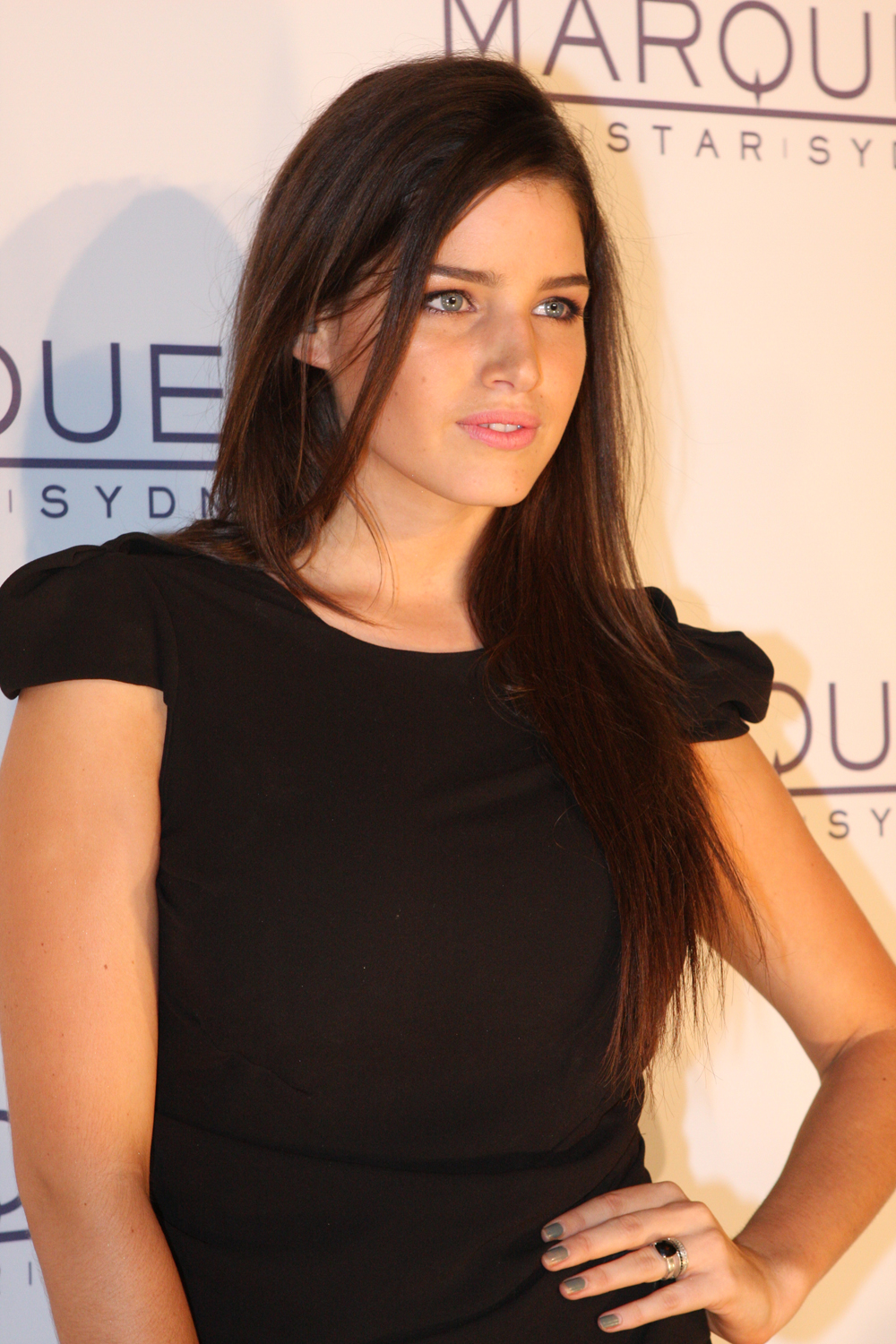
- Born: Tahnee Atkinson; 31 January 1992 (age 34); North Fremantle, Western Australia, Australia
- Occupation: Model
- Years active: 2008–present
- Modeling information
- Height: 1.76 m (5 ft 9 1/2 in)
- Hair color: Brown
- Eye color: Blue
- Agency: IMG Models

Tahnee Atkinson (born 31 January 1992) is an Australian model, best known for winning the cycle 5 of Australia's Next Top Model.

== Australia's Next Top Model ==
Tahnee was often considered one of the front runners in the competition, garnering 3 first call-outs and winning 3 challenges. During the competition, Tahnee's weight was criticised by other contestants, judges, and fashion industry professionals. In one of the challenges, Tahnee won the lead in a Telstra advertising campaign. In another challenge, she won a $10,000 shopping spree at the Corner Shop, opting to give $1,000 to another contestant Adele Thiel. On 7 July 2009 Tahnee was announced the winner of cycle 5 of Australia's Next Top Model and was awarded $20,000 cash, and contracts from Priscilla's model management, Maybelline and Harper's Bazaar magazine.

== Career ==
In 2008 Tahnee, along with fellow Australia's Next Top Model contestant Clare Venema, was a state finalist in the Girlfriend Magazine Model Search; however, both girls were disqualified as they were already signed to model agencies. Atkinson was previously signed to Scene Models in Perth.

During the fifth cycle, Tahnee walked the runway for Nicola Finetti and Alex Perry. As the winner of Cycle 5 Atkinson won a 12-month contract with Priscilla's model management, a contract with Maybelline New York, and a spread in Harper's Bazaar magazine. She has also signed a 6-month deal with Harper's and will model exclusively for the magazine with her first shoot in August. Her print work includes a Bettina Liano campaign.

Atkinson is currently signed to IMG Models.

== Early life ==
Atkinson attended Presbyterian Ladies' College, Perth.

Preceded by Demelza Reveley	Australia's Next Top Model winner Cycle 5 (2009)	Succeeded by Amanda Ware
