= Australia's Next Top Model season 8 =

Australia's Next Top Model
- Season 8
- Judges: Jennifer Hawkins; Alex Perry; Charlotte Dawson; Didier Cohen
- No. of contestants: 15
- Winner: Melissa Juratowitch
- No. of episodes: 12

Release
- Original network: Fox8
- Original release: 9 July – 24 September 2013

Season chronology
- ← Previous; Season 7 Next → Season 9

The eighth cycle of Australia's Next Top Model began airing 9 July 2013 on Fox8. Model and Miss Universe 2004 Jennifer Hawkins took over as the host for this season, replacing Sarah Murdoch. Hawkins had previously appeared in one episode at the inaugural cycle, joining incumbent judges Alex Perry and Charlotte Dawson with Didier Cohen joining the show as a new judge. This is the last series of Australia's Next Top Model to feature Dawson, before she died of an apparent suicide five months after it ended.

The prizes for this cycle included a one-year modelling contract with IMG Sydney and worldwide representation by IMG London, New York, Milan and Paris, as well as a A$20,000 cash prize thanks to TRESemmé, a brand new Nissan Dualis, an overseas trip to Paris to meet with IMG Paris, and an eight-page editorial spread and the cover of Harper's Bazaar Australia.

The winner of the competition was 16-year-old Melissa Juratowitch from Melbourne, Victoria.

== Series summary ==
Fifty contestants were selected to take part in this years' competition. The first episode of the show was shown in a special screening for fans of the series. Fifteen official contestants were chosen to compete for the title.

=== Requirements ===
As with previous seasons, all contestants had to be aged 16 or over in order to apply for the show. Those auditioning had to be at least 172 centimetres (68 in) tall. To qualify, all applicants had to be an Australian citizen currently living in Australia. Additional requirements stated that a contestant could not have had previous experience as a model in a national campaign within the last five years, and if a contestant was represented by an agent or a manager, she had to terminate that representation prior to the competition.

=== Auditions ===
Auditions for cycle 8 began to take place on 13 January in Adelaide, continuing in Perth, Brisbane, Townsville, and Sydney throughout the rest of the month before wrapping up in Melbourne on 23 January.

== Cast ==
=== Contestants ===
(Ages stated are at start of contest)

Contestant	Age	Height	Hometown	Finish	Place
Chanique Greyling	20	175 cm (5 ft 9 in)	Newcastle	Episode 2	15
Taylor Henley	17	177 cm (5 ft 9 1/2 in)	Adelaide	Episode 3	14
Rhiannon Bradshaw	19	178 cm (5 ft 10 in)	Brisbane	Episode 4	13
Brooke Hogan	21	179 cm (5 ft 10 1/2 in)	Melbourne	Episode 5	12–11
April Harvey	18	172 cm (5 ft 7 1/2 in)	Tweed Heads	Episode 5	12–11
Taylah Roberts	18	175 cm (5 ft 9 in)	Perth	Episode 6	10 (DQ)
Madeline Cowe	19	176 cm (5 ft 9 1/2 in)	Cairns	Episode 7	9
Ashley Pogmore	18	173 cm (5 ft 8 in)	Sydney	Episode 8	8
Shannon Richardson	18	175 cm (5 ft 9 in)	Gold Coast	Episode 9	7
Jade Collins	20	178 cm (5 ft 10 in)	Sydney	Episode 10	6–5
Dajana Bogojevic	17	173 cm (5 ft 8 in)	Queanbeyan	Episode 10	6–5
Abbie Weir	17	181 cm (5 ft 11 1/2 in)	Maclean	Episode 11	4
Duckie Thot	17	179 cm (5 ft 10 1/2 in)	Melbourne	Episode 12	3
Shanali Martin	16	178 cm (5 ft 10 in)	Melbourne	Episode 12	2
Melissa Juratowitch	16	172 cm (5 ft 7 1/2 in)	Melbourne	Episode 12	1

=== Judges ===
- Jennifer Hawkins (host)
- Alex Perry
- Charlotte Dawson
- Didier Cohen

== Episodes ==
No. overall	No. in season	Title	Original release date
76	1	"Episode 1"	9 July 2013
The judges met the top fifty contestants for bootcamp at Cockatoo Island. As part of Australia's history as a penal colony, the contestants took part in several challenges and photo shoots relating to different convict themes. After taking part in group interviews with the judges, half of the contestants were eliminated. The elimination was followed by a runway show on a plank and a jailbird photo shoot session. After deliberating one final time, the top fifteen contestants were selected, and it was revealed that they would be travelling to Thailand for the next stage of the competition.: Featured photographer: Michael Naumoff
77	2	"Episode 2"	16 July 2013
The top fifteen contestants arrived in Bangkok and were taken to a Buddhist temple for a meditation lesson before taking part in a styling challenge at the local market, where they were split into teams of five. For the photo shoot, the contestants were photographed as rich Thai travelers lost in the countryside.: Featured photographer: Kane Skennar
78	3	"Episode 3"	23 July 2013
The top fourteen contestants moved into the model mansion and had a lesson on healthy eating with James Duigan, while Ashley was taken to the hospital due to a case of appendicitis. In preparation for an upcoming challenge, the contestants received a message from Candice Swanepoel regarding the importance of body endurance, fitness, and strength in the field of modeling. At the challenge, they were faced with an arduous and grueling obstacle course in which the winner received $2,000 worth of fitness apparel and a years' supply of health supplements, before being styled as sports luxe athletes for the photo shoot.: Special guests: James Duigan, Candice Swanepoel; Featured photographer: Justin Ridler
79	4	"Episode 4"	30 July 2013
The models were driven to Elizabeth Bay House for a lesson on proper etiquette. They later had a red carpet challenge in which they had to face the press, paparazzi, and fans of the show for a mock movie premiere at the Ritz Cinema to win the chance of appearing in a national Nissan Dualis commercial. At the photo shoot, the top thirteen contestants had to embody a modern interpretation of the 1950s housewife.: Special guests: June Dally-Watkins, Rachael Finch; Featured photographer: Derek Henderson
80	5	"Episode 5"	6 August 2013
The top twelve contestants were driven to the Australian Reptile Park in order to overcome their fears by touching the animals, and later had makeovers before walking in front of members of the industry and media, as well as their loved ones. They later arrived at Hyde Park for a vintage Calvin Klein inspired photo shoot.: Special guests: Julie Mendezona, Troy Thompson, Thelma McQuillan, Danielle Ragenard; Featured photographer: Harold David
81	6	"Episode 6"	13 August 2013
The top ten contestants arrived at Broken Hill for a lesson on line dancing to learn about teamwork, and later took part in a painting challenge. Conflict escalated after a paint fight between Ashley and Taylah turned physical, and the judges alluded that the issue would be addressed at panel. The contestants then had to work in pairs to embody fugitives escaping into the Outback in a photo shoot inspired by the film Thelma and Louise. During elimination it was revealed that Taylah was disqualified from the competition, and that as a result, no one would be sent home that week.: Special guests: Tin Gauci, Kathy Ferry; Featured photographer: Jordan Graham
82	7	"Episode 7"	20 August 2013
The top nine contestants were taken to Manning Cartell for a crash course on runway walking, and received pointers from Jennifer Hawkins and Gabby Manning. They then took part in a casting challenge for Colgate Optic White to front one of their new campaigns, and secretly had their behaviour monitored as they reacted to awkward situations planted by producers of the show. Later, the contestants arrived at the Hilton Hotel for a glamorous photo shoot that showcased their smiles.: Special guests: Gabby Manning, Julian Watt, Matt O'Brien; Featured photographer: Simon Upton
83	8	"Episode 8"	27 August 2013
The top eight contestants arrived at the Sydney Opera House for a ballet lesson from a principal artist of The Australian Ballet, and later put their knowledge to the test in a mute fashion film for the new flavor range of Mount Franklin's Sparkling Water. The best performer was rewarded with a custom made Samantha Wills jewellery set worth over $1,000. For the photo shoot, the contestants posed in surfwear to create an image that was representative of Australian beach culture.: Special guests: Amber Scott, Alex Goddard, Camilla Franks, Jordan Stenmark, Zac Stenmark; Featured photographer: Zac Handley
84	9	"Episode 9"	3 September 2013
The top seven contestants arrived at House of Yoga Redfern for a session of anti gravity yoga to learn how to make more dynamic poses. They later went to garden square for a constricted styling challenge in a telephone booth to re-create looks from the Alex Perry Spring/Summer collection, and one of the contestants made and offhand comment that didn't sit well with Alex Perry. The winner of the challenge was treated to high tea with a friend at the Langham Hotel. After an emotional discussion with Didier Cohen regarding their lives before the show, the contestants had a photo shoot with mirrors for an editorial spread to be published in Cosmopolitan.: Special guests: Evangeline Yeun, Bronwyn McCahon, Nicole Adolphe; Featured photographer: Richard Freeman
85	10	"Episode 10"	10 September 2013
The top six contestants met ex-rugby player Kris Smith for an exercise session to help them channel their inner male qualities. They were later introduced to drag king Rocco DÁmore, and were dressed in male attire for a challenge in which they had to pretend to be men and stay in character whilst talking to a stranger. The winner received a $700 Microsoft Surface tablet. The contestants were then taken to the beach for a timeless 90s B&W masculine styled photo shoot.: Special guests: Kris Smith, Rocco DÁmore; Featured photographer: Georges Antoni
86	11	"Episode 11"	17 September 2013
The top four contestants were flown to the island of Mauritius to take part in two photo shoots that would help determine who will be the three contestants would make it to the grand finale. Their challenge took the form of an underwater runway show for which the best performer was treated with a traditional Mauritian sugar scrub massage. The first photo shoot was a moody session on the beach with gothic styling, followed the next day by a colorful couture shoot among residents of the Mauritian fishing village. The contestants also received letters from their families back at home. Back in Australia, the judges decided who will be the top three contestants.: Featured photographer: Jez Smith
87	12	"Episode 12"	24 September 2013
The live show opened with a catwalk performance from the top fifteen contestants to Rudimental's song "Feel the Love", and the judges were asked their opinions of the top three contestants. The final shoot for the cover and spread in Harper's Bazaar was shown, and the judges interviewed their favorite contestanrs on their thoughts about their careers and modelling. After a second runway performance, the show highlighted each contestants' journey throughout the competition, before going over interviews with their friends and family. Immediately afterwards, Duckie was sent home. The final two then perform in a rendition of Michael Jackson's "Smooth Criminal" with Cirque du Soleil, and Melissa was revealed to be the eighth winner of Australia's Next Top Model.: Special guests: Rudimental, Ricki-Lee, Cirque du Soleil

== Results ==
Order	Episodes												
Order	1 (Note: In episode 1, the finalists were selected. The top 50 was reduced to a pool of 25 girls, which were in turn reduced to the final 15 contestants. The first official elimination took place in episode 2.)	2	3	4	5 (Note: Episode 5 was a surprise double elimination.)	6 (Note: In episode 6, Jade and Madeline were awarded best picture as a pair. Taylah was disqualified from the competition. As a result, no one was eliminated.)	7	8	9	10 (Note: Episode 10 was a three way double elimination.)	11	12	
1	Ashley	April	Taylah	Melissa	Melissa	Jade; Madeline	Duckie	Shanali	Dajana	Abbie	Shanali	Shanali	Melissa
2	Dajana	Brooke	Melissa	Madeline	Jade	Jade; Madeline	Jade	Abbie	Duckie	Shanali	Melissa	Melissa	Shanali
3	Duckie	Duckie	Duckie	Shanali	Duckie	Ashley	Dajana	Dajana	Abbie	Melissa	Duckie	Duckie	
4	Rhiannon	Melissa	Rhiannon	Duckie	Shanali	Shanali	Shanali	Duckie	Jade	Duckie	Abbie		
5	Shanali	Ashley	Shannon	Ashley	Abbie	Dajana	Shannon	Melissa	Melissa	Dajana; Jade			
6	Taylah	Taylah	Jade	Taylah	Shannon	Abbie	Ashley	Shannon	Shanali	Dajana; Jade			
7	Brooke	Shanali	Brooke	Jade	Madeline	Shannon	Abbie	Jade	Shannon				
8	Chanique	Dajana	Dajana	Brooke	Dajana	Duckie; Melissa	Melissa	Ashley					
9	Taylor	Abbie	Ashley	Shannon	Ashley	Duckie; Melissa	Madeline						
10	Madeline	Taylor	April	April	Taylah	Taylah							
11	Abbie	Madeline	Abbie	Dajana	April; Brooke								
12	Jade	Rhiannon	Shanali	Abbie	April; Brooke								
13	Shannon	Jade	Madeline	Rhiannon									
14	Melissa	Shannon	Taylor										
15	April	Chanique											

The contestant was eliminated
The contestant was disqualified
The contestant was part of a non-elimination bottom two
The contestant won the competition

=== Bottom two ===
Episode	Contestants	Eliminated
2	Chanique & Shannon	Chanique
3	Madeline & Taylor	Taylor
4	Abbie & Rhiannon	Rhiannon
5	April & Brooke	April
5	April & Brooke	Brooke
6	Duckie & Melissa	Taylah
7	Madeline & Melissa	Madeline
8	Ashley & Jade	Ashley
9	Shanali & Shannon	Shannon
10	Dajana, Duckie & Jade	Dajana
10	Dajana, Duckie & Jade	Jade
11	Abbie & Duckie	Abbie
12	Duckie, Melissa and Shanali	Duckie
12	Melissa & Shanali	Shanali

The contestant was eliminated after her first time in the bottom two/three
The contestant was eliminated after her second time in the bottom two/three
The contestant was disqualified from the competition
The contestant was eliminated in the final judging and placed third
The contestant was eliminated in the final judging and placed as the runner-up

=== Average call-out order ===
Final two is not included.

Rank by average	Place	Model	Call-out total	Number of call-outs	Call-out average
1	3	Duckie	38	11	3.45
2	1	Melissa	41	11	3.73
3	2	Shanali	45	11	4.09
4	5-6	Jade	47	9	5.22
5	5-6	Dajana	52	9	5.78
6	4	Abbie	60	10	6.00
7	8	Ashley	45	7	6.43
8	10	Taylah	33	5	6.60
9	11-12	Brooke	28	4	7.00
10	9	Madeline	43	6	7.17
11	7	Shannon	59	8	7.38
12	11-12	April	32	4	8.00
13		Rhiannon	29	3	9.67
14		Taylor	24	2	12.00
15		Chanique	15	1	15.00

=== Photoshoot Guide ===
- Episode 1 Photo Shoots: Mugshot Polaroids; Jailbirds in Prison Uniforms (Casting)
- Episode 2 Photo Shoot: Lost Travelers in Thailand
- Episode 3 Photo Shoot: Sports Luxe Athletes
- Episode 4 Photo Shoot: Modern 1950's Housewives
- Episode 5 Photo Shoot: Calvin Klein Inspired Vintage Lingerie
- Episode 6 Photo Shoot: Grunge Runaways in the Outback in Pairs
- Episode 7 Photo Shoot: Glamorous Women for Colgate
- Episode 8 Photo Shoot: Surfer Women on the Beach
- Episode 9 Photo Shoot: Mirrored Reflections for Cosmopolitan
- Episode 10 Photo Shoot: 90's Androgyny in B&W
- Episode 11 Photo Shoots: Mermaids on the shores of Port Louis; Colorful Designs in a Fishing Village
- Episode 12 Photo Shoots: Harper's Bazaar Covers and Spreads

=== Makeovers ===
- Brooke - Katy Perry inspired long bob and dyed brown
- April - Elizabeth Taylor inspired pixie cut
- Taylah - Jade Thirlwall blonde and collar bone length cut
- Madeline - Long angled line bob and dyed brown
- Ashley - Jesy Nelson dark blonde and collar bone length cut
- Shannon - Hair straighten, long angled line hair and middle part
- Jade - Tyra Banks inspired neck length cut with bangs and dyed dark brown
- Dajana - Dyed light brown and cut collar bone
- Abbie - Dyed light blonde and Cut chest length
- Duckie - Dyed light blonde and shaved
- Shanali - Trimmed and thread
- Melissa - Dyed dark blonde and trimmed

== Post–Top Model careers ==
- Chanique Greyling signed with IMG Models, Jaz Daly Management, Kult Model Management and Elite Model Management in Los Angeles. She has taken a couple of test shots and walked in fashion shows of Billabong, Michael Lo Sordo SS14.15,... She has modeled for Stüssy, General Pants Co., Asics, Surf Dive 'n Ski, Beach Bunny Swimwear US, Privvy Fashion, Funboy US, Plus Fitness Warners Bay, Mountain Dew,... and appeared on magazine editorials for Complete Wedding, Oyster April 2014, Imute Romania October 2014, Bl!sss US September 2015, Flaunt US September 2015, Santa Barbara Life & Style US #10 October 2015, Live To Ride February 2020,... Beside modeling, Greyling is also one of the 12 Gladiators on Gladiators 2024, competed on beauty competition ICN Fitness NSW and work as a stuntwoman which she has appeared on several movies and televisions such as Thor: Love and Thunder, Home and Away, Last King of the Cross, Critical Incident, NCIS: Sydney, The Fall Guy, We Bury the Dead,...
- Taylor Henley did not modeling after the show.
- Rhiannon Bradshaw signed with Work Models, Jaz Daly Management, Vivien's Model Management, Pride Models, White Model Management & Wilhelmina Models in Tokyo. She has taken a couple of test shots and walked in fashion show for Martin Grant. She has appeared on magazine cover and editorials for Iqon Japan #1 May 2014, Revs UK #7 December 2014, Cake US August 2015, Russh May 2017,... and modeled for Romance Was Born, Christie Nicole, Krystle Knight Jewellery, Alpha60 The Label, Deuxieme Classe Japan SS14, Emoda Japan SS14, Moussy Japan SS14, Ungrid Japan, Lepidos Swimwear Japan, Kloke FW14, Nice Martin Winter 2017, Obus Clothing Winter 2017, Unreal Fur,... Bradshaw retired from modeling in 2020.
- April Harvey signed with Emg Models, Busy Models, Vivien's Model Management and MDI Model Management in Seoul. She has taken a couple of test shots and appeared on magazine cover and editorials for Graphy Korea, Wedding21 Korea, Like A Lion November 2013, MX February 2014, The Neighbor Korea June 2015, Marie Claire Weddings Korea August 2015, Nakid US October 2015, Heren Korea May 2016,... She has modeled for Toni & Guy, Toni Matičevski, Lowe Alpine Korea, Kappa, Discovery Expedition Korea, Tosca Blu Korea, Faye Woo Korea, Choi Jae-hoon Wedding, Rockwear AU, Atelier Love Paris Korea, Hum Clothing Korea, Treksta Korea Fall 2016, SYZ Creative Korea, Soulpot Studio Korea, Minty Meets Munt,... Harvey retired from modeling in 2017.
- Brooke Hogan signed with IMG Models, Vivien's Model Management, Storm Management in London and Promod Model Agency in Hamburg. She has taken a couple of test shots and walked in fashion shows of David Jones, Sportsgirl SS15.16, Kookaï SS19.20,... She has appeared on magazine cover and editorials for Women's Health, Women's Fitness, Stellar, Los Angeles Firm Inc. US July–August 2014, Yen November 2014, Virgin Australia Voyeur April 2015, HUF US April 2016, Jute US Spring 2016, Imute Romania November 2016, Fashion Gone Rouge April 2017, Elbazin November 2020, Just Jeans, Yves Saint Laurent, Steven Khalil, Kaiami Swimwear, Intimo Lingerie, May The Label Spring 2015, Kachel Clothing, Peppermayo, Ozmosis, Viktoria & Woods, Infamous Swim, All About Eve Clothing, It's Now Cool, Sass Clothing, Elwood Apparel Co., Triangl Swimwear, Gooseberry Intimates Indonesia, Nelly Sweden, Kopper & Zink Swimwear, Ghanda Clothing Summer 2016, Gingerlilly Sleepwear, Olga Berg, Anna Campbell, Grace Love Lace, Jaggad Activewear, L'urv Activewear, Mae's Sunday, Lorna Jane, Midnight Co. AU, Anton Jewellery, Kenny Parker Label, Le Món,...
- Taylah Roberts signed with IMG Models, True Models in Istanbul and Red 11 Model Management in Auckland. She has taken a couple of test shots and modeled for General Pants Co., The Iconic, All That Remains, Christie Nicole, Oz Beauty Expert, Cotton On, Duskii, Hopeless Lingerie, Morrison Clothing, Curaae, Özgür Masur FW15.16, H&M FW16, White Story AU, Nacgraw Clothing, Deer Ruby AU, Moochi New Zealand, Insane In The Rain, Dyspnea, Isla Label FW17, Charlie Holiday,... She has appeared on magazine cover and editorials for Cosmopolitan, Russh, Blkonblk New Zealand, Catalogue March 2015, C-Heads February 2014, Fashion Gone Rogue March 2015, Good Weekend April 2015, Sunday Style August 2015, Flaunt US September 2015, Harper’s Bazaar Turkey October 2015, Cosmopolitan Turkey October 2015, Oob France December 2016, Grazia August 2017, Vane New Zealand #8 Winter 2017,... and walked in fashion shows of Carla Zampatti, Dyspnea, Viktoria Novak Headpieces, Watson x Watson SS16, Jayson Brunsdon SS16, Jewels & Grace, Rebecca Vallance, Wild Pony Swimwear,... Roberts is no longer modeling in 2020 and currently pursue a career as a photographer.
- Madeline Cowe signed with London Management Group, Scoop Model Management, Chic Management, Vivien's Model Management and Pride Models. She has taken a couple of test shots and appeared on magazine cover and editorials for Sunday Mail, Townsville Eye, Vanilla #20 October 2016, Duo #153 May–June 2019,... She has modeled for Rebel Sport, GlamCorner, David Jones, The Upside AU, Frankies Bikinis, Pastiche Jewellery SS18, Sunescape Tan, Cinch Skin, Luv Bridal, Portmans, Le Tan AU, Jaggad Activewear, Glow By Beca, Bask Eyewear, Twosisters The Label, Karen Willis Holmes, Cotton On, Binny Wear, Bluebell Bridal, Homelove The Label, Made With Love Bridal, Une Piece Swimwear, Tussah The Label, Sunseeker Swimwear, Fresh Soul Clothing FW23, White Label Noba, Trish Peng, Vero Moda, Townsville Turf Club, Hypoxi AU,... Beside modeling, Cowe has also competed on several beauty pageants such as Miss Universe Australia 2014, Miss Tourism Australia 2014, Miss Universe Australia 2015, Miss World 2016, Miss Universe Australia 2019,...
- Ashley Pogmore signed with IMG Models, Bella Management and Leni's Model Management in London. She has walked in fashion show for Stax. Activewear Winter 2022 and appeared on magazine editorials for NFM US February 2019, Rock N Roll Bride #28 September–October 2019, Go Beauty Denmark July 2020,... She has taken a couple of test shots and modeled for Lee, Adidas, The Iconic, Guess, Napoleon Perdis, OPSM, Arthur Apparel, Nevada Clothing, Revolve Clothing, Ally Fashion, Sandyheads Collection, Abrand Jeans, LaBante London, Meshca Jewellery, Christie Nicole, Nude By Nature, Dermalist Skincare, Alkam Store, Mezi Jewellery, Karen Willis Holmes, MCo. Beauty, Femme Society, Indigo & Wolfe, Lenni The Label, Mandasen, Everau, Hollywood Fashion Secrets AU, Aruma Beauty Room,... Beside modeling, Pogmore has also competed on Miss World Australia 2016.
- Shannon Richardson signed with Emg Models, Chic Management and 2Morrow Models in Milan. She has walked in fashion shows of Fairy Floss Tribe, Simone Pérèle, Shehzarin Batha,... and appeared on magazine cover and editorials for Gold Coast Panache November–December 2013, Material Girl Austria July 2014,... She has taken a couple of test shots and modeled for The Sloane Society FW14, Sheike Boutique, Silk Oil Of Morocco, Lunatic Fringe AU, Sport Lé Moda, We Are Handsome Swimwear, Muchacho Clothing, Amy Louise Hair, De Lanty Australia,... Richardson retired from modeling in 2017.
- Dajana Bogojevic signed with London Management Group, Fivetwenty Model Management, MMG Models in Dubai and Muse Model Management in New York City. She has taken a couple of test shots and walked in fashion shows of Chachino Couture, Brides Francesca, Haluminous, Yohana Resort 2018, Odd Design,... She has appeared on magazine cover and editorials for Modern Wedding, Ljepota & Zdravlje Bosnia, Like A Lion January 2014, Canberra Weekly March 2014, Elléments US October 2014, Vogue Brides June 2016, Complete Wedding September 2016, Lita FW18, Pageone January 2019, Zahrat Al Khaleej UAE August 2019, Shuba US August 2020,... and modeled for Salted Carousel Boutique, St Frock, Sara Aljaism, Ashleigh Maroun Hair, Cosette AU, Edition by Alice Sutton, Mira Mandić, Lillian Khallouf, Your Closet AU, Marina Antoniou Jewellery, Danielle Lo Jewellery, ALT Swimwear, Ounass UAE, Mariam Seddiq, Jenny Yoo, Pure Market Serbia,... Bogojevic retired from modeling in 2023.
- Jade Collins signed with IMG Models, London Management Group, Début Management, Bella Management, Wizard Models in Tokyo, Model Directors Management in Seoul and Milk Model Management in London. She has taken a couple of test shots and walked in fashion shows of Louis Vuitton Japan, Whitehouse Institute of Design, Yousef Akbar Resort 2018, Karla Špetić Resort 2018, Agnona, Snidel Japan, Hare Japan SS18, Sacai x Undercover SS18, Murral Spring 2018,... She has modeled for Lee, General Pants Co., Kappa, Adidas, Fila Korea, Rodney Wayne, All That Remains, Christie Nicole, We Are Savages AU, Casea The Label, Peppermayo, Nevada Clothing, The Gypsy & The Officer, Kela Hair Jewellery, Ally Fashion, Cherie Japan SS18, Limi Feu Japan SS18, Dana Lock The Label, Gillian Garde, Sarah & Sebastian Jewellery, Vuiel Korea SS18, Snackculture Korea, Simon Mo FW18, Georgina Marie SS19,... and appeared on magazine cover and editorials for Vogue Taiwan, The Daily Telegraph May 2014, Minc #10 July 2014, Northside US March 2017, Aponia #6 May 2017, Glitter Japan November 2017, Institute UK November 2018, Pageone November 2018, Alpha Fashion US SS19, The Draft UK February 2019,... Collins retired from modeling in 2022.
- Abbie Weir signed with IMG Models, Pride Models, True Models in Istanbul and Mega Model Agency in Hamburg. She has taken a couple of test shots and modeled for By Johnny, Dimattia & Co Hair, All That Remains, Holly Ryan Jewellery SS14, Pol Clothing Summer 2014, Zimmermann Resort 2015, Camilla and Marc SS15, Finders Keepers The Label, Kirrily Johnston, Peter Alexander, Lauren Marinis Fall 2016, Saltwater Silver,... She has appeared on magazine cover and editorials for Oyster, Woman Madame Figaro Spain, C-Heads February 2014, Odalïsque Sweden May 2014, Bride to Be #168 May–July 2014, The Sydney Morning Herald August 2014, Female Singapore November 2014, Icon Singapore November 2014, Le Temps Switzerland December 2014, Shop Til You Drop May 2015, Elle Singapore July 2015, Style: Malaysia September 2015, Originel Turkey October 2015, Nylon Indonesia January 2016, Schön! UK March 2016, The Journal March 2020,... and walked in fashion shows of David Jones, Toni Matičevski, Romance Was Born, Michael Lo Sordo, Wildhorses Label, Dyspnea SS14.15, Etam France FW14.15, Atsuro Tayama FW14.15, A.P.C. FW14, Tony Ward FW14.15, Camilla With Love FW14, House Of Zhivago FW14, Tettmann.Doust FW14, Garth Cook FW14, Karla Špetić SS15, Haryono Setiadi SS15, Lan Yu FW14.15, Oscar Carvallo FW14.15, Myer SS15, Kookaï SS14.15, Carla Zampatti SS15.16, By Johnny SS15.16, Akira SS15.16, Steven Khalil SS15.16, Jennifer Kate SS15.16, Manning Cartell SS15.16, Galanni SS15.16, CS Edit x Kirrily Johnston SS15.16, Johanna Johnson SS15.16, Dzojchen Cruise 2016, Lena Hoschek SS16, Vektor Womenswear SS16, Steinrohner SS16, Impuls_03 Graduate SS16, Irene Luft SS16, Marina Hoermanseder SS16,... Weir retired from modeling in 2018.
- Duckie Thot signed with IMG Models, Pride Models, Chadwick Models, Kult Model Management, Fashion Model Management in Milan, Modelwerk in Hamburg, Premium Models in Paris, Creative Artists Agency in Los Angeles, Elite Model Management in New York City & London, New York Model Management & Creative Talent Management in New York City, Storm Management & Tess Management in London. She has modeled for Target, Sephora, Fenty Beauty, L'Oreal, Urban Decay, Bonds, Selfridges, Ugg, Dollhouse Salon, Gorman Activewear, Oceanus Swimwear, Frank Body, One Day Bridal, Hopeless Lingerie, Morgan & Taylor SS15, Bronx & Banco US Resort 2015, Camilla With Love Resort 2016, Rubi Shoes, Alessandra Cashmere, Dinosaur Designs Jewellery, Collina Strada SS17, Law Beauty Essentials US, FME Apparel, Norma Kamali FW17, Olympia Le-Tan FW17, Puma FW17, Moschino FW17, Drome Italia FW17.18, MISBHV SS18, Helmut Lang SS18, Oscar de la Renta SS18, Barneys New York US Pre-Fall 2018, Balmain FW18, Topshop FW18, Prabal Gurung Spring 2019, Farfetch Fall 2019, Vivienne Westwood FW19.20, Telescopic Mascara, Dumebi Iyamah SS23, Country Road Group Spring 2024,... and walked in fashion shows of Toni Matičevski, Myer, Bianca Spender, Romance Was Born, Victoria's Secret, Jeremy Scott, Prabal Gurung, Yeezy US,David Jones FW16, Alannah The Label, J'Aton Couture, Dion Lee, Bec + Bridge, Camilla With Love Resort 2016, House Of Cannon, Discount Universe Resort 2017, Naeem Khan SS17, Fashion East FW17, Dsquared2 SS18, Valentin Yudashkin SS18, Hussein Chalayan SS18, Mansur Gavriel SS18, Helmut Lang SS18, Maison Margiela FW18, Balmain SS19, Moschino SS19, GCDS SS19, Philipp Plein SS19, Elisabetta Franchi SS19, Oscar de la Renta SS19, Valentino SS19, Savage X Fenty SS19, Christian Cowan SS19, Monse SS19, Lionne Clothing FW21, LaQuan Smith SS22, Tommy Hilfiger FW22, Puma SS23, Di Petsa FW24,... She has taken a couple of test shots and appeared on magazine cover and editorials for Harper's Bazaar, Oyster, Paper US, V US, W US, Vogue Italia, King Kong France, British Vogue, Marie Claire México, Blkonblk New Zealand, Teeth US August 2014, Sicky US November 2014, i-D August 2015, Unfold Rundle Mall SS16, Laud June 2016, Fashion Journal September 2016, Jack US #1 SS17, Teen Vogue March 2017, BLVD Kazakhstan #5 Summer 2017, Harper's Bazaar Kazakhstan June 2017, Vogue August 2017, Vogue Japan September 2017, Vogue India October 2017, Allure US November 2017, ES UK February 2018, Grazia #3 March 2018, Harper's Bazaar Mexico September 2018, Wonderland UK Fall 2018, Stylist UK September 2018, Antidote France September 2018, Love UK November 2018, Emirates Woman UAE January 2020, The Glass UK Summer 2020, The Perfect UK March 2021, Stellar June 2021, Office US #15 Summer 2021, Marie Claire July 2021, Good Vibes South Sudan #3 August 2021, Numéro Russia #66 May 2022, Sports Illustrated US May 2022, Sunday Life December 2022, 10 Magazine #21 SS23, Flaunt US #191 Spring 2024, Harper's Bazaar Arabia March 2024, Russh #1 August 2024,... Beside modeling, Thot is also the global ambassador of L'Oreal.
- Shanali Martin signed with IMG Models, Giant Management, Chadwick Models, Anima Creative Management in Mumbai, Milk Model Management in London, Premium Models in Paris, D Model Agency in Athens and Urban Models in Milan. She has modeled for The Iconic, Sportsgirl, Rodd & Gunn, Just Jeans, Alex Perry, Holly Ryan, Oglia-Loro Couture, Péro India FW15, Chemistry India FW15, Gorman Clothing, Aaizél, Cotton On, Winter Muse AU, Delphine The Label SS19, Mimco, Arca Jewelry, Sophie Deloudi, Kevin Murphy, Helen Thurley O’Connor, Stan Ray, Vanessa Mooney, Reserved Summer 2022, Didit Hediprasetyo FW22, Ami Paris, Musier Paris Spring 2023, Emanuel Ungaro FW23, The District Docklands, Beacon Lighting Winter 2023,... and appeared on magazine editorials for Harper's Bazaar November 2013, Fashion Journal #138 August 2014, Elle India July 2015, Harpers Bazaar India August 2015, Vogue India September 2015, Vogue August 2018, Instyle Hair May–June 2019, Factice France May 2022,... She has taken a couple of test shots and walked in fashion shows of Manish Arora, Myer, Trelise Cooper, Alice McCall, Kookaï, David Jones, Chadstone Shopping Centre, Carla Zampatti, Camilla and Marc, Martin Grant, La Maison Talulah, Neo Dia Label, Haryono Setiadi SS15, Sol Sana, Swarovski SS15, Pol Clothing Summer 2015, Gorman Clothing Fall 2015, Bec + Bridge Resort 2015, Issey Miyake SS16, Léa Peckre SS16, Mariam Seddiq, Manning Cartell SS16, Gary Bigeni SS16, Aalto International SS16, Steven Khalil SS16, Johanna Johnson SS16, Strateas Carlucci FW16, Aje. Clothing, Double Rainbouu, Diida The Label, Celia Kritharioti FW19, On|Off Presents... FW20, Shrimps FW20, Armani Privé FW22, Georges Chakra FW22.23, Patou SS23,...
- Melissa Juratowitch has collected her prizes and signed with IMG Models. She is also signed with Pride Models, Ave Management in Singapore, Bravo Models in Tokyo, Go-See Mother Agency & Premier Model Management in London. She has taken a couple of test shots and modeled for Kawsa Hair Studio, Maison Tsumiki, Pinnacle Runway The Label SS15, Daisy LTD, Varsity Club, Asilio World, Aaizél, Dilara Fındıkoğlu SS19, Evie Stocker SS19, LN-CC Outerwear FW19, Lazy Oaf UK, Gabrielle Venguer Mexico, Poster Girl UK FW20, Zandra Rhodes FW20, Emily Watson FW21, Tyija Love,... Juratowitch has appeared on magazine cover and editorials for Sicky US, Harper's Bazaar November 2013, Vox Populi US December 2013, Oyster January 2014, Kiss Me Stupid February 2014, Dew Indonesia #14 October 2014, Black New Zealand April 2015, Mod US #5 Fall 2015, Style: Singapore November 2015, Female Singapore November 2015, Nüyou Singapore November 2015, Nylon Singapore November 2015, Oob France June 2016, L'Officiel Singapore April 2019, L'Officiel Vietnam April 2019, Editorial Canada #19 June 2019, Kunst US July 2019, Dazed UK SS19, SCMP Style July 2019, Vogue Portugal August 2019, 10 Magazine UK #63 FW19, Contributor Germany August 2019, Tush Germany #45 September 2019, Tank UK #80 September 2019, The Glass UK Fall 2019, S Canada October 2019, Vogue Italia #829 October 2019, 20 Minuten Friday Switzerland October 2019, T Magazine Spain #27 October 2019, Marfa Journal UK #5 November 2019, Metal Sapin #42 December 2019, The September Issues #4 May 2020, Version #1 June 2020, Dada #1 August 2020, Elle México August 2021,... She retired from modeling in 2024.

== Controversy ==
Prior to the airing of the cycle, it was reported that a contestant had been disqualified from the competition for bullying. Host Jennifer Hawkins said of the incident, "I don’t know why but I went into (the show) thinking ‘oh, there won’t be drama, everything will be fine’, but of course there is always drama. A lot of things have happened in the house and we were dealing with something that hasn't happened before. It was really intense." Hawkins later specified that the cause for disqualification was not bullying, but violence among two of the contestants on the show. She also revealed that Foxtel and the show's production company Shine Australia requested for the girl to be ejected. The disqualified contestant was revealed to be Taylah Roberts from Perth, who physically attacked Ashley Pogmore. The day before the airing of the episode in which Roberts was disqualified, footage of Roberts choking Pogmore was shown on A Current Affair.
