= Melissa Juratowitch =

Australian fashion model

- Born: Melissa Lee Juratowitch; January 29, 1997 (age 29); Melbourne, Victoria
- Years active: 2013–2024
- Modeling information
- Height: 1.75 m (5 ft 9 in)
- Hair color: Brown
- Eye color: Brown
- Agency: Premier Models

Melissa Juratowitch, known professionally as Liss Juratowitch, (born January 29, 1997) is an Australian former model, best known for being the winner of Australia's Next Top Model season 8.

== Career ==
As winner of Australia's Next Top Model season 8, Juratowitch appeared on the cover of Harper's Bazaar Australia in November 2013. The winner's prizes also included a one-year modelling contract with IMG Sydney and worldwide representation by IMG London, New York, Milan and Paris, as well as a A$20,000 cash prize thanks to TRESemmé, a Nissan Dualis and an overseas trip to Paris to meet with IMG Paris.

In 2015, Juratowitch appeared in editorials for magazines including Oyster, Nylon Singapore, Nüyou and Her World and graced the cover of Style:. In April 2019, Juratowitch appeared in an editorial for L'Officiel Vietnam.

Preceded by Montana Cox	Australia's Next Top Model winner Season 8 (2013)	Succeeded by Brittany Beattie
