= Ian Poh Jin Tze =

Singaporean writer and photographer

Ian Poh Jin Tze is a Singaporean writer, photographer, and author known for his work in travel, food, and wildlife photography. His work has appeared in publications including SilverKris and Eater. He is the author of Behind The Scenes: Lives of These Unsung Heroes (2023) and The Silent Song of the African Savannah (2025), which was a finalist for the 2025 Foreword INDIES Book of the Year Awards.

== Early life and career ==
Poh began his career as a freelance writer and photographer contributing to travel, food, and lifestyle publications in Southeast Asia. His work has appeared in SilverKris, Eater, The Smart Local, Asian Food Network, and Le Cordon Bleu.

In 2023, Poh published his first coffee table book, Behind The Scenes: Lives of These Unsung Heroes, documents the lives of workers in the agricultural and hospitality sectors across Southeast Asia. It is structured around five immersive journeys: to durian harvesters in Raub, Malaysia, melon growers hand-pollinating vines at dawn, coffee farmers in Bali, explorers searching for ancient springs in Perak, and workers at a luxury retreat in Malaysia. Wandering Educators described the book as "a pure delight". It was featured in The Straits Times, Expat Living Singapore, and the Milan Journal. BlueInk Review described the book as a collection of travel-based stories focused on the lives and experiences of often-overlooked individuals.

Ian was selected for BBA One Shot Award in 2024, an international single-image photography competition held at BBA Gallery, Berlin.

Ian's second coffee table book, The Silent Song of the African Savannah (2024), is a photographic journey across the game parks of Africa, presented predominantly in colour across five chapters, with one chapter dedicated to monochrome photography. The work is structured as a visual story in five parts moving through the African savanna depicting predation, interspecies relationships, maternal behaviour, and landscape. The book received a five-star Clarion rating from Foreword Reviews, describing it as "a stunning coffee-table book that captures a variety of life in a singular place." The book was shortlisted for the 2025 Foreword INDIES Book of the Year Award in the photography category. It was also featured in Psychology Today , where it was described as "a heartfelt invitation to connect emotionally with wildness."

Both books are distributed through branches of the National Library Board of Singapore and are displayed at the Singapore Photography Museum.

In 2026, his work was exhibited as part of the Cizucu photo poster project at Selegie Arts Centre and his photographic work is represented on Saatchi Art.

== Selected publications ==
- Behind The Scenes: Lives of These Unsung Heroes (2023), ISBN 978-981-18-8829-8
- The Silent Song of the African Savannah (2024), ISBN 978-981-941819-0
