= List of magazines in Singapore =

This is a list of magazines from Singapore.

== English ==
- 8 Days
- The Asian Banker Journal
- Asian Scientist
- August Man
- AdventureFaktory
- Couture Troopers
- Destination
- Dwell
- Element
- Elle Singapore
- Elle Men Singapore
- Esquire Singapore
- Go! Singapore Magazine
- Expat Living Singapore
- Harper's Bazaar Singapore
- Her World
- Home & Decor
- HRM Asia Magazine
- Human Capital Magazine
- L'Officiel Singapore
- L'Officiel Hommes Singapore
- Men's Folio
- Nylon
- Run Singapore
- SG Magazine
- Shape
- STYLE:
- Torque
- The Peak
- Vanilla Luxury
- Vogue Singapore
- OG

== Malay ==
- Manja
- Sensasi
- Sutra

== Chinese ==
- ICON
- L'OFFICIEL时装新加坡

== Bilingual ==
- Nüyou (English, Chinese)
