= Duckie Thot =

South Sudanese–Australian model (born 1995)

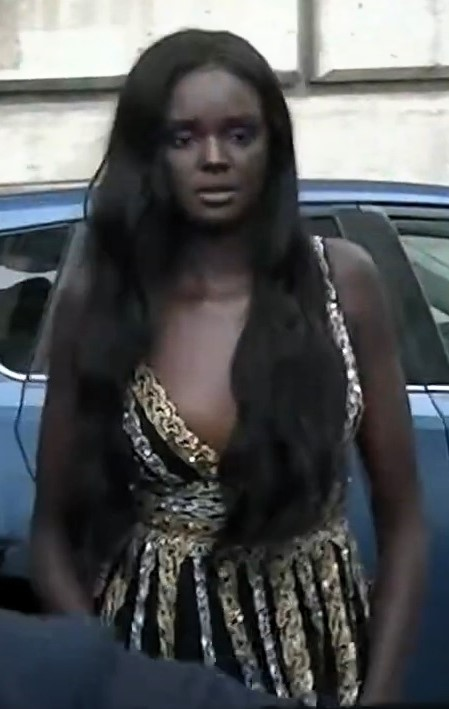
- Thot after a 2019 fashion show
- Born: Nyadak Thot; 23 October 1995 (age 31); Melbourne, Victoria, Australia
- Years active: 2013–present
- Modeling information
- Height: 5 ft 10 1/2 in (1.79 m)
- Hair color: Black
- Eye color: Brown
- Agency: CAA (New York, Los Angeles); Tess Management (London); Chadwick Models (Sydney)

Nyadak "Duckie" Thot (born 23 October 1995) is an Australian model. Thot rose to prominence after being the last contestant eliminated on the Australia's Next Top Model season 8 and made her runway debut at the Yeezy S/S 17 show. She is best known for being a face of Fenty Beauty as well as playing the lead role in the Alice in Wonderland–inspired 2018 Pirelli Calendar.

== Early life ==
Thot was raised in Melbourne with her family as South Sudanese refugees. Her mother was pregnant with her when they left the country due to war. She is one of seven siblings, and the first to be born in Australia. In Melbourne, her classmates and teachers at school weren't able to pronounce her birth name, Nyadak; this led to Thot going by the nickname "Duckie", which she prefers to go by as a model. She attended Maranatha Christian School and graduated in 2013.

== Career ==
Thot was introduced to the modelling industry by her model and YouTube star sister, Nikki Perkins, who chaperoned her on photo shoots. From there, Thot became inspired to audition for season eight of Australia's Next Top Model in 2013, where she became the last contestant eliminated.

Beginning her modelling career in Australia where she walked the runway for David Jones in 2016, Thot overall found making bookings difficult due to what she believed was the lack of opportunity for models of colour in Australia. She made the decision to move to Brooklyn, New York in hopes that she could become a more successful model in America. After scheduling meetings with multiple modeling agencies, Thot flew to New York. In New York, she got multiple offers to sign with agencies and ultimately chose to sign with New York Model Management.

Kanye West helped to turbo charge Thot's career. After Thot left a casting in New York one day, West's assistant chased her down the street to invite her to meet West immediately. Thot ended up shooting a magazine cover that same day. Thot went on walk in the Yeezy Spring/Spummer 2017 show which was her first international catwalk show.

Since 2018, Thot has been a global ambassador for L'Oreal Paris. Thot participated in campaigns for Fenty x Puma, Fenty Beauty, Moschino, Balmain, and Oscar de la Renta. She debuted in the 2018 Victoria's Secret Fashion Show. Thot appeared on the cover art for CHIC's album It's About Time, which was released in September 2018.

Pirelli's 2018 annual calendar spectacular, shot by Tim Walker and styled by Edward Enniful, was a powerful all-black retelling of Alice in Wonderland in which Thot was cast as Alice and is credited to helping her rise to fame. Before her work with Pirelli, Thot stated that she often provided her own makeup at shoots as there often wasn't a consideration for her skin colour. She has since been vocal about diversity, race inclusion and Black Lives Matter in the fashion industry, after stating that she is often the only person of colour on set. Speaking to The Glass Magazine in 2020, Thot said "I think that the fashion industry has come far, but to really push it forward it needs to go further than just hiring models of colour. The industry needs to be more receptive when it comes to hiring diverse talent to work in the creative and decision-making fields." Thot stated that when she was growing up she did not see people that looked like her in the beauty industry. She hopes that her work will allow others to see themselves reflected and know that nothing is off limits to them.

In January 2022, Sports Illustrated Swimsuit announced Thot as a 2022 rookie.

== Personal life ==
Thot currently resides in the Brooklyn borough of New York City.

Thot stated that her family never let her forget her roots and stated, "Coming to Australia from South Sudan created a sense of diaspora for my parents so they were always very diligent about incorporating our culture into our everyday lives as much as possible. Whether that be speaking to each other in our mother language, eating traditional foods, attending a South Sudanese church, and consuming entertainment directly related to our culture." Praying is something that helps Thot stay grounded, and her favourite Bible verse is Philippians 4:13.

Rihanna has become a friend and mentor to Thot after their work together for Fenty.

Thot dated actor Kofi Siriboe in 2018.

In 2016, make up artist Pat McGrath was inspired to create a new cosmetics colour to suit Thot's skin tone.

Thot has been given the nickname of "Black Barbie", which she says is "lovely" but comes with "pretty high expectations".
