= Romance Was Born =

Australian fashion house

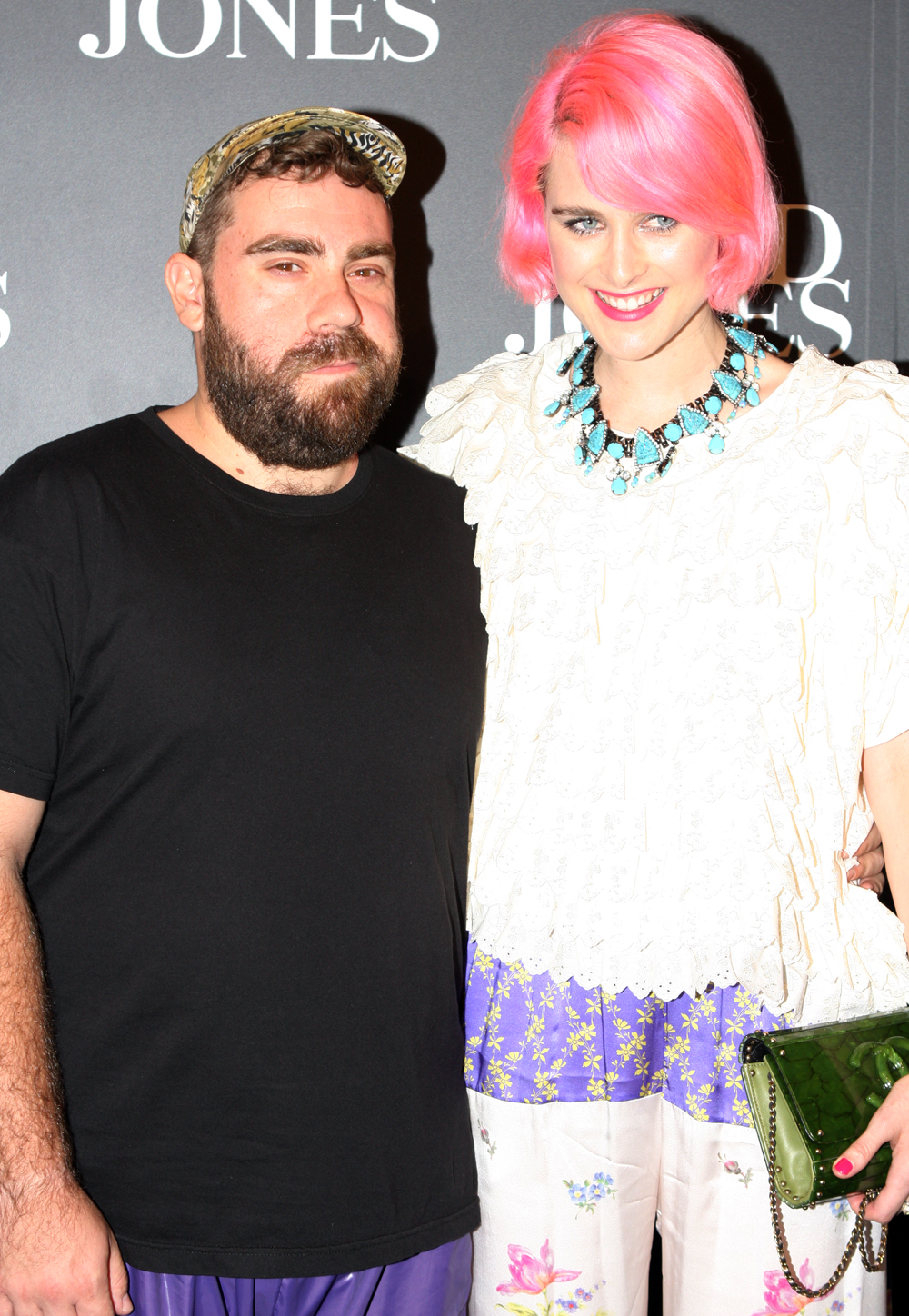
- Luke Sales and Anna Plunkett, David Jones AW13 Fashion Launch, Sydney, Australia, 2013
- Industry: Apparels, accessories
- Founded: 2005; 21 years ago
- Founder: Anna Plunkett, Luke Sales
- Headquarters: Sydney, Australia
- Products: Garments, Wallpaper, Furniture, Art Installations, Fashion Shoots, Toys, Theatre
- Website: www.romancewasborn.com

Romance Was Born is an Australian fashion house, founded by Anna Plunkett and Luke Sales in 2005. Producing haute couture and women's ready-to-wear garments and accessories, the brand produces designs that "freely toy with the relationship between fashion and art", often evoking an influence of Australiana.

== History ==
Anna Plunkett and Luke Sales first met in the early 2000s whilst studying fashion design at East Sydney Technical College (now known as TAFE NSW Sydney Institute). The duo founded Romance Was Born after turning down an internship with Galliano at Dior to 'do their own thing'. The name for the business reportedly came from a pin purchased in Sydney's Chinatown by Sales' cousin.

"As a fashion house, they are well known for their [...] garments, but have also designed for a number of diverse mediums, including wallpaper, furniture, art installations, fashion shoots, toys, theatre and pop performance costumes." In 2008, the brand produced a capsule collection for retailer Sportsgirl. In January 2020, they re-released a popular collection of garments and accessories based on characters from May Gibbs' popular Snugglepot and Cuddlepie books.

According to their website, Romance Was Born's main ethos is to "create immersive cultural experiences that provoke an emotional response."

== Collaborations ==
Romance Was Born has a strong emphasis on collaboration, particularly other Australian artists and designers, in the hope that they can "explore a creative common ground and build an awe-inspiring relationship between fashion and art." Their first collaboration was with Archibald Prize winner Del Kathryn Barton.

The duo have also collaborated with musical acts including The Presets and Architecture in Helsinki.

In 2017, they launched a collection of five rugs with Designer Rugs, with designs adapted from their print archives. They've followed this with collaborations with other designers, the hotel chain QT Hotels, as well as major corporations such as Lego, Disney and Marvel.

Design collaborations have included:

- Jenny Kee and Linda Jackson
- Ken Done
- May Gibbs
- Paul Yore.

== Recognition ==
Several Romance Was Born pieces are held in Australian museums and galleries, including 13 works at the National Gallery of Victoria, and three works at the Powerhouse Museum (Iced Vo Vo dress, crocheted dress & platform shoes).

In 2014, Romance Was Born was featured in a group exhibition at the NGV International, called Express Yourself: Romance Was Born for Kids, which ran from 17 October 2014 through to 12 April 2015. According to the National Gallery Victoria, the "vision was to create a fantastical, larger-than-life environment for participation, play and creativity that blended fashion, art, music and design. The resulting exhibition featured works from RWB collections past and present, the NGV collection and collaborating artists. It highlighted Sales and Plunkett's trademark collaborative style and creative themes that continue to underpin their practice".

Notable celebrities such as Cate Blanchett, Tavi Gevinson, Karen O, MIA, Natasha Khan, Cyndi Lauper, Lily Allen, Grimes and Miley Cyrus have worn Romance Was Born on the red carpet.

In 2018, Romance Was Born published a book entitled Romance Was Born: A Love Story with Fashion, detailing their rise to prominence in the Australian fashion scene.

In 2019, designs by Romance Was Born were featured in the New York Metropolitan Museum of Art's summer exhibition Camp: Notes on Fashion.

A portrait of Plunkett by Meagan Pelham titled Romance is LOVE was a finalist in the 2022 Archibald Prize.

Romance Was Born and Anne Cordingley won the 2022 Sydney Theatre Award for best costume design of a mainstage production for their work on Amadeus.
