= Steven Khalil =

Australian fashion designer

Steven Khalil is an Australian bridal and red carpet fashion designer, known for his bridal and red carpet gowns. Khalil launched his own fashion brand in 2003, 'Steven Khalil', and has since gained popularity. His designs have been worn by many Australian and International celebrities such as Samantha Jade, Giuliana Rancic, Dannii Minogue, Ariel Winter, Jessica Mauboy, Paula Abdul, Kylie Jenner, Khloe Kardashian, Kris Jenner, Jennifer Lopez, Kelly Preston, Emily Ratajkowski, Carrie Underwood, Princess Olympia of Greece, Georgia Fowler and Jesinta Campbell.

== Early life ==
Steven Khalil was raised in Campbelltown Western Sydney by his single mother who immigrated to Australia at the age of 21 from Lebanon with her then husband (and Steven's father). Khalil is the youngest of four children. From a young age, Khalil was intrigued by fashion designers such as Yves Saint Laurent, Christian Dior and Coco Chanel. However, Khalil's love for fashion, specifically bridal wear began at 7 years old, where he was highly anticipating the Royal Wedding of Prince Charles and Princess Diana. Khalil was drawn to Princess Diana's dress, especially its fabric, drape, movement and length and thus ultimately triggered his journey to becoming a bridal and red carpet fashion designer. At age 11, he received his first sewing machine and began sewing small items such as scrunchies and clothing items for dolls.

=== Education ===
Khalil has expressed that he was always drawn to the creative subjects in high school, such as art, textiles and design technology. After graduating high school, despite being rejected from his desired fashion school, East Sydney, Khalil continued to pursue his dreams and studied Fashion Design, Bridal Couture and Clothing Production for three and a half years.

== Career ==
=== Early career ===
Khalil's first fashion related job was working with a bridal boutique, making flower girl dresses and doing basic errands. Shortly after, Khalil began working in Double Bay's well known bridal boutique, Mark Holt Bridal, where he was able to expand and refine his skills. Khalil continued working at Mark Holt's Bridal for seven years with love and passion, becoming Head Designer at 22 years old. His talents were indeed exposed and celebrated, with his bridal designs landing on the front page of magazine covers across the nation. Likewise, many of his designs were sent to editorial shoots. Eventually, his talent was recognised in various bridal houses across Sydney, Khalil opened his own fashion boutique in Paddington, known as, 'Steven Khalil'.

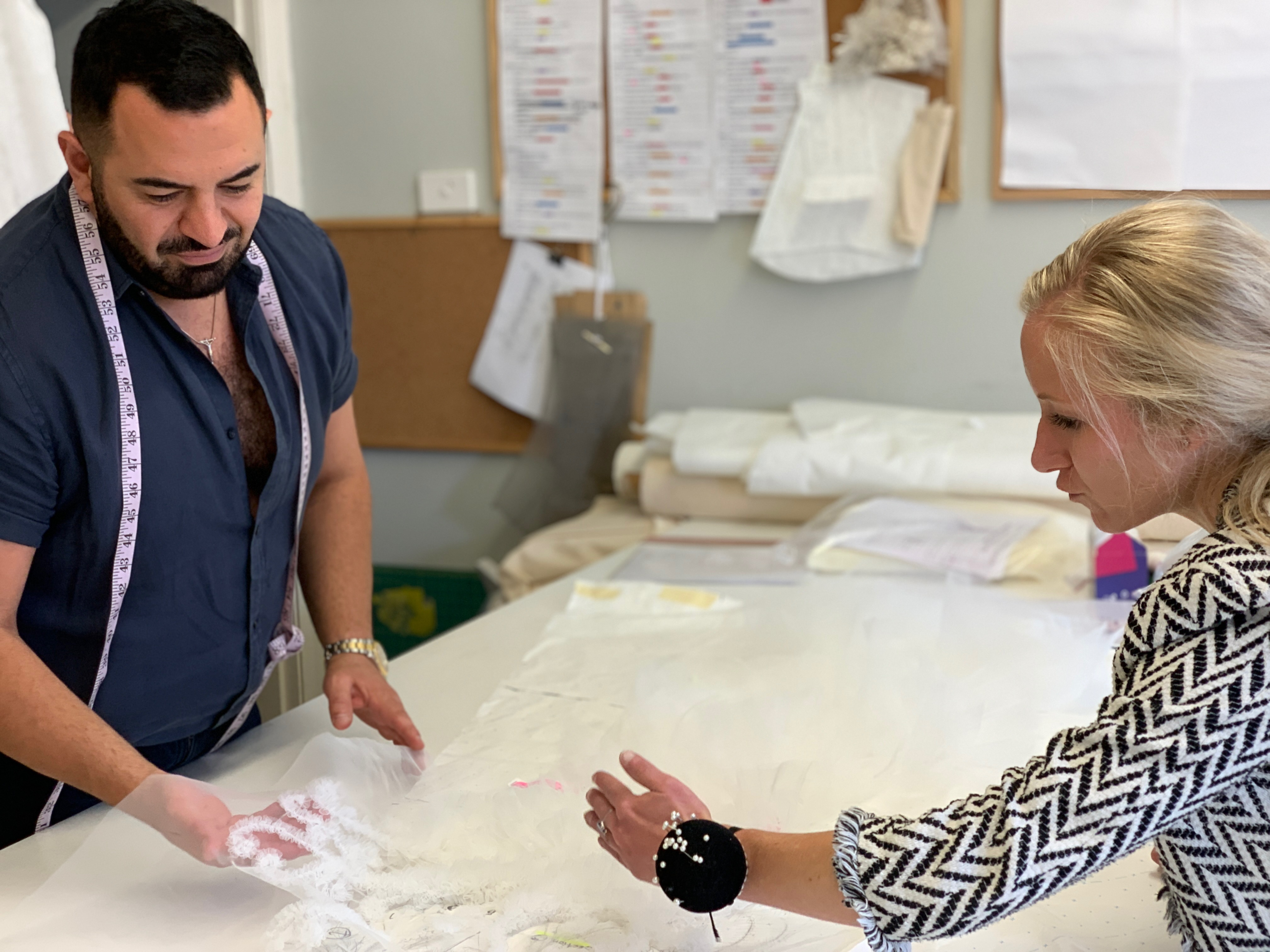
Steven Khalil, in his Atelier in Paddington, Sydney

=== Current career ===
Opening his first bridal boutique at just 27 years old, Khalil's designs soon became renowned both locally and internationally. While Khalil has expressed that he certainly struggled and made mistakes in the early years of his boutique, he continued to strive and learn from them. Thereafter, the future bridal market became highly intrigued with Khalil's modern and romantic gowns. As a result, Khalil was able to establish his clientele, which included celebrities and high profile social identities. Khalil's attention to intricate detail presented him with an opportunity to design Red Carpet gowns, which are now well known to be worn among celebrities such as Jennifer Lopez, Emily Ratajowski, and the Kardashian/Jenner family. While increasing his expertise, skills and understanding the bridal market over the course of his career, Khalil has gradually released bridal and red carpet collections since the beginning of his own business, including showing at 2019 Paris Haute Couture Fashion Week. Khalil's designs have expanded to an international scale, launching international stockists such as The Wedding Club, a luxury bridal wear store based in London, and is hoping to expand to Europe and Dubai. Due to his popularity in the US, Khalil opened a showroom in LA for celebrity stylists to access his gowns. A large part of Khalil's career centralises around fashion shows, domestically and internationally, which gives the ability for designers to showcase their work, increase clientele and generate a well branded name.

Although Khalil is well regarded for his bridal and red carpet designs, in late 2017, he launched his own perfume for women, 'Steven Khalil Eau De Parfum'. Khalil created the perfume around the idea that the woman would have a special connection to the scent in conjunction to a special event, in particular, their wedding day.

== Bridal, couture and red carpet launches ==
=== 2014 Collection ===
Khalil created several bridal and red carpet pieces for the Fashion Palette Show 2014. This launch consisted of a range of couture gowns in neutral tones such as nude, white and gold, with statements of navy and aubergine. Khalil's inspiration for this collection was derived from the idea of all things 'Luxe' and metallic statements. Moreover, this collection utilised imported fabrics, such as Italian wool, silk and French lace. Khalil's favourite piece from this collection was known as the 'Warrior Gown', to which he described as a piece for an 'ultimate goddess gown for a strong women.'

=== 2015 Mercedes Benz Fashion Week ===
Steven Khalil's works have been appreciated and celebrated over the many years at Mercedes Benz Fashion Week, an international fashion week that recognises notable designers. Khalil's 2015 collection consisted of feminine silhouettes, fitted suits and elegant embellishments, emanating a fairytale charm. The show opened with navy and metallic tones presented in fitted suits and luxurious sleek gowns. This was followed by bold yellows and corals, which complimented each other. Thereafter, Khalil's models closed the show with his signature white gowns, each consisting of intricate detail and design. His attention to colour palette, fabric, length and trail was indeed prominent in 2015's MBFW.

=== 2015/16 Ready to Wear Spring/Summer ===
The 2015/16 Ready to Wear Collection maintained simplicity, consisting of black pant suits, plunging neck lines, feathering, sequences and neutral tones, that similar to the 2014 collection. Hints of neon were also visible among the detailing of skirts.

=== 2017 Mercedes Benz Fashion Week ===
2017 was a memorable year for Khalil, as he closed his fashion show with a $100,000 bridal couture piece. With eight months of planning and over 300 hours of handwork, the dress featured a mesh bodice and floor length veil, covering the entire width of the catwalks surface. Indeed, it received much attention from the press and buyers, specifically from Middle Eastern countries, however, Khalil stated that he would like to save it in his archiv

=== 2018/2019 Bridal Collection ===
Khalil's most recent collection exudes a romantic aura, hence its title, 'Romance Ultime'. The collection consists of French lace, custom beading, tulle and intricate embroidery. Khalil wanted to return the 'classic feminine bride' in this collection.

2019 Couture Collection

Khalil showcased at the prestigious Haute Couture Paris Fashion Week in 2019.

== Celebrities and royalty ==
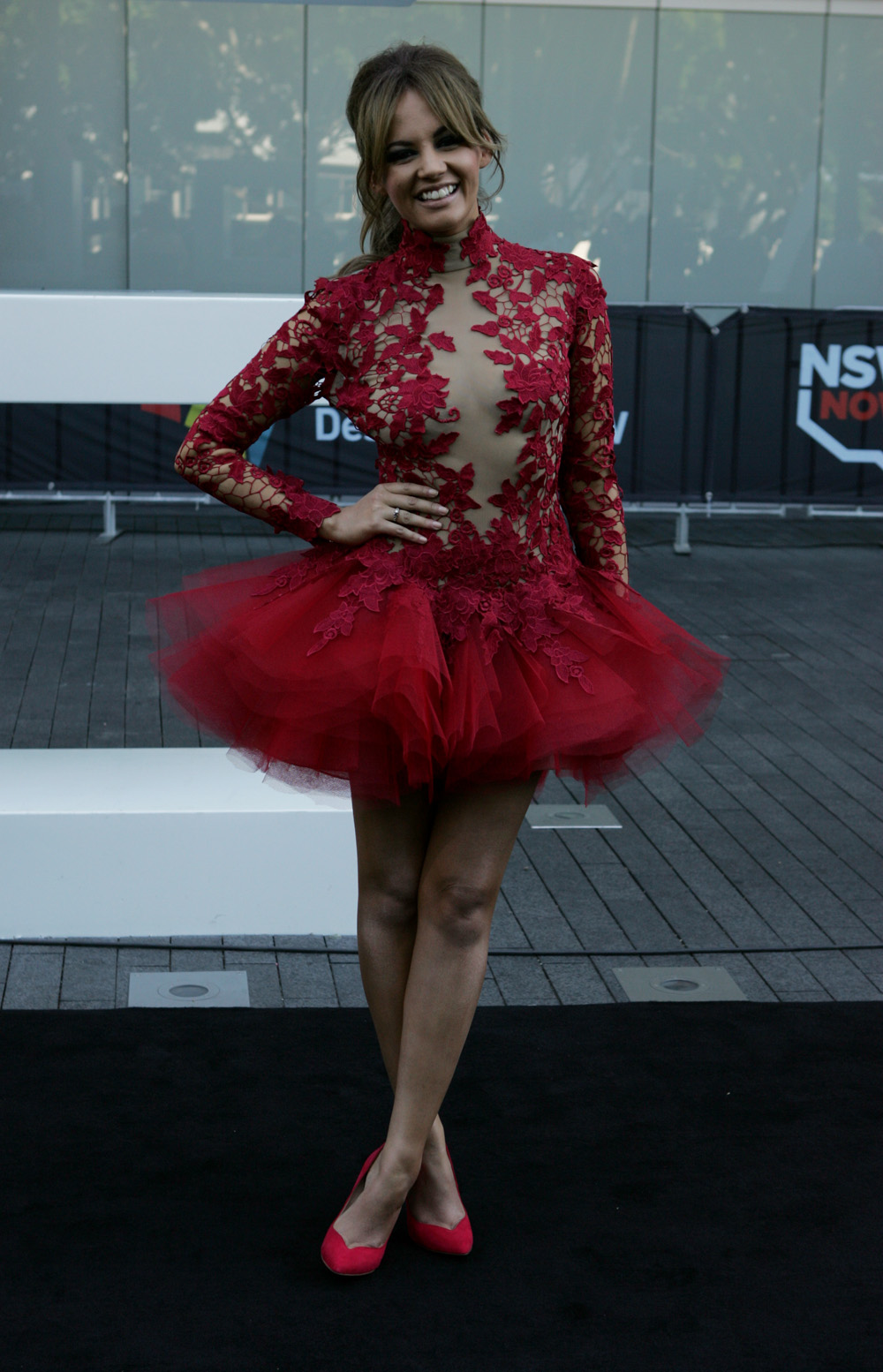
Samantha Jade wearing Steven Khalil's dress.

Steven Khalil's bridal and red carpet designs have been worn by many high profile identities since the beginning of his business. His increase in clientele can be due to his international showrooms in the United States that have showcased his works, which have been caught by the eye of celebrities such as Kylie Jenner. Guliana Rancic, E News host, has also worn Khalil's gowns regularly at Red Carpet events such as the Oscars and the Grammys. Likewise, Australian celebrities such as Samantha Jade and Sonia Kruger have been seen frequently wearing Khalil's designs to red carpet events. Khalil's designs are also worn by several Australian celebrity brides. The list of brides includes Nicole Trunfio, Bianca Chetah, Zoe Stenmark, Nikki Phillips, Zoe Marshall, Rachael Finch, Erin McNaught, Storm Keating, Anna Heinrich and Tessa James. Anna Heinrich particularly received attention from media outlets due to great public interest about her wedding dress. She wore Khalil's new 'Romance Ultime' Collection, which featured intricate beading, detailing and floral designs.

Khalil's designs have also gained the attention from royalty. Following the Mercedes Benz Fashion Week show in 2017, Khalil received an email from the Princess Olympia of Greece, who requested to wear a piece from THE MBFW show to her 21st birthday.

== Bridal Wear Trends ==
Fashion shows, whether they're domestic or international, play a large role in exhibiting and categorising trends of the year. While bridal trends do not fluctuate too much, shows such as the Mercedes Benz Fashion Week Australia is an integral part to the bridal wear industry, providing an avenue for Australian fashion designers to progress and demonstrate their range.

=== 2018 ===
Bridal wear trends and styles are continually evolving and adapting with time. 2018 consisted of a range of trends, especially after The Royal Wedding of Meghan Markle and Prince Harry. Named the 'Meghan Markle Effect', many bridal designers, including Steven Khalil were influenced by Markle's dress, which was simple, clean and minimalist. During some time before the Royal Wedding, a few Australian news articles and blogs, including the Sydney Morning Herald and 'Who' questioned and speculated if Khalil was going to be designing Markle's wedding dress. Additional bridal wear trends that have taken over the fashion landscape this year include 'Femme Florals'. This trend centralises around beading, lace detailing and soft colours, all of which Khalil has executed in his 2018/2019 Bridal Collection, 'Romance Ultime'.

=== 2017 ===
The trends and styles exhibited during Spring of 2017 certainly contrast from 2018 trends. 2017 consisted of plunging necklines, capes and off the shoulder designs. Certainly the most prominent trend was the 'Non-Wedding, Wedding Look', which is designed with the means to be compatible with any wedding style event, including the reception and the after party. Khalil is synonymous with this trend, especially in his Red Carpet designs which are seen to be worn by many celebrities during red carpet, wedding and like events.

=== 2016 ===
2016's bridal fashion consisted of a range of styles, however, maintained a traditional aura. Designs such as feminine tuxedos, feathering, floral and deep necklines were most popular. Likewise, Khalil exhibited these trends in his 2015/2016 Ready to Wear Spring/Summer Collection. However, Khalil did step outside the trends slightly by including sequence and details of bright neon.

== Other contributions ==
Alongside creating Bridal and Red Carpet pieces, in 2017, Khalil collaborated with PROJECT FUTURES, a project that aims to help women and young children who are in danger to human trafficking, slavery and sex exploitation in Australia and Cambodia. The partnership raised awareness of the heinous crimes against women and children by designing a t-shirt, and providing all of its profits to the Australian charity Project Futures. Such profits contribute access to shelter, food education, and to services such as medical and psychological treatment for those women and children who are exploited to such circumstances.
