= Fashion house (disambiguation) =

Fashion house can refer to:

- A commercial company associated exclusively with fashion, either ready-to-wear, bespoke, or haute couture
- Fashion House, a 2006 telenovela
