= Kookai =

French women's fashion label

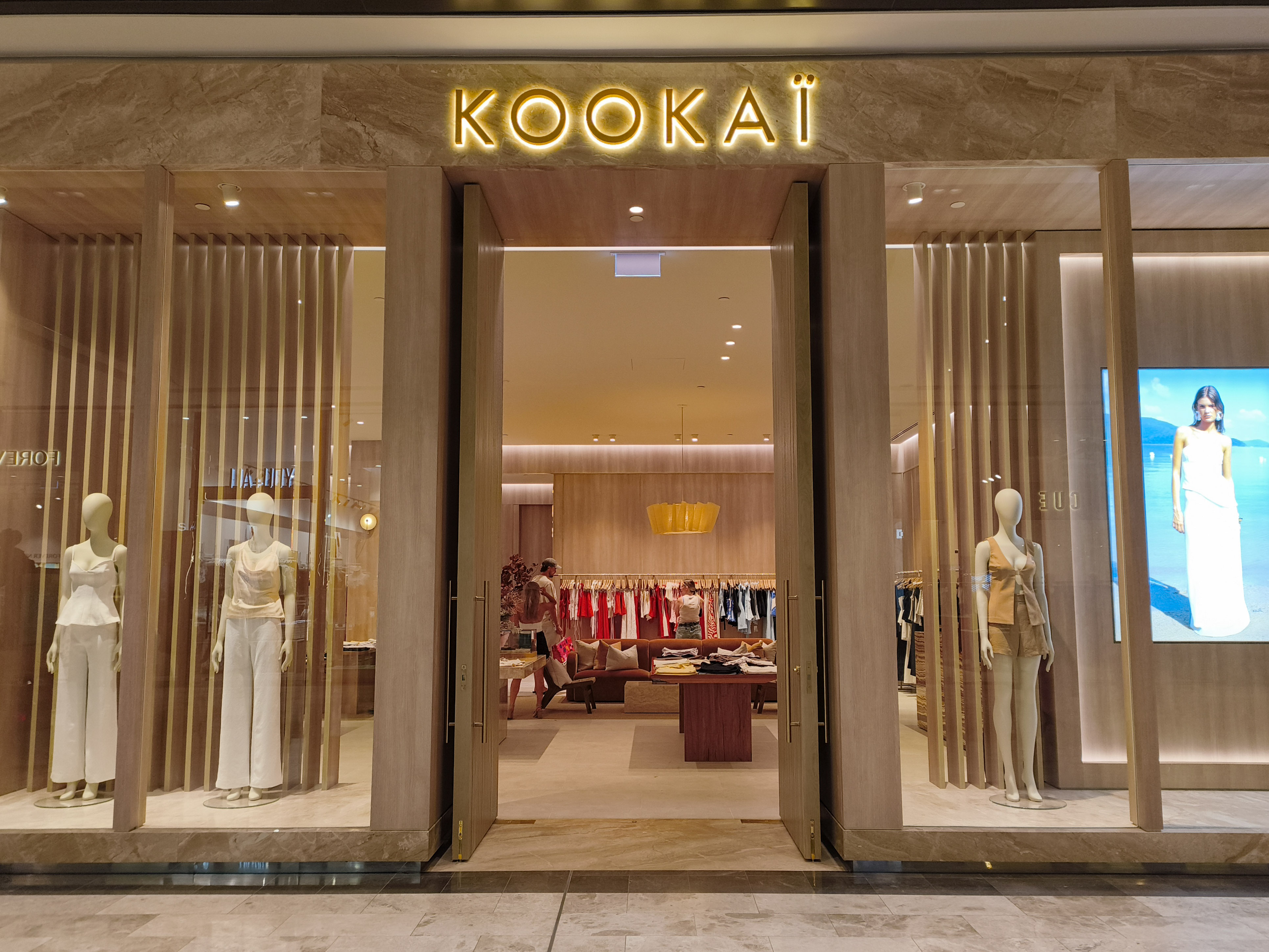
Kookai store in Westfield Carousel, Australia

Kookai is a women's fashion label founded in Paris, France in 1983 by Jean-Lou Tepper, Jacques Nataf and Philippe de Hesdin. It has a simple philosophy: "to supply women with fashion forward apparel for their wardrobes at accessible prices". Kookai was launched in Australia in 1992 by its Australian licensees, Robert Cromb and Danielle Vagner. In 2017, Robert Cromb and Danielle Vagner acquired the European Kookai business from the Vivarte Group to create one global, unified brand.

Today, Kookai has over 200 stores throughout Europe, Asia, Australia and New Zealand. Its clothing line is generally characterised as Parisian-infused chic.

Kookai owns its own manufacturing facilities in Fiji and Sri Lanka where a majority of the collection for the Southern Hemisphere is produced.

== Ethical behaviour ==
In 1996, Kookaï joined the Vivarte Group and subsequently signed an Ethical Charter to ensure that the products sold in Kookaï stores are manufactured in ethical conditions. The label has maintained an ethical image through other affiliations. Affiliations include the UNICEF "Frimousses" operation that raises money to give children in need the opportunity to receive vaccinations. The label has raised money for HIV/AIDS and Breast Cancer awareness.

In 2012, Kookai Australia launched its own charity, Katalyst Foundation. Katalyst Foundation's approach to providing long-term, sustainable solutions to poverty in underdeveloped countries focuses on developing self-sufficient economies within communities by:

- Providing communities with new skills and trades;
- Teaching communities to maximise the use of their natural resources;
- Encouraging locally led, community involvement;
- Providing a guaranteed marketplace for the sale of goods produced; and
- Providing the necessary infrastructure for healthy eating, drinking and living.

== Support ==
Kookaï also supports students studying fashion and arts. Its most notable collaboration is with the Fondation Elle. With the Fondation Elle, Kookaï launched a contest that gave three designers the opportunity to create a small collection for the stores. The contest was called "Prix ELLE Solidarité mode". They also hosted an eco-friendly competition for students at the Decorative Arts School. The students were asked to create window displays with recycled garments from the Parisian stores.

== Kookaï in France ==
Kookaï has been featured in a number of French fashion magazines including: Be, Marie Claire, Cosmopolitan, Glamour and Elle. They have an e-boutique to enable customers to do their shopping online. The shop includes size charts and shipping information. Frequent shoppers in the French stores, both online and offline, can obtain a loyalty card on which they accumulate points when they purchase regular priced items. When customers achieve a certain number of points, they receive credit for their purchases.

On 1 February 2023, Kookai was placed in receivership, stating it was "an opportunity to bounce back and clean up its financial situation." On 30 November 2023, Kookai was sold to Antonelle Un Jour Ailleurs.
