= Michael Lo Sordo =

Australian fashion designer

Michael Lo Sordo is an Australian fashion designer.

== Early life ==
Lo Sordo was born in 1984, in Sydney, Australia, and is of Italian heritage. He has a twin sister, as well as an older sister. He originally set out to be a chef, but changed his mind and registered for the fashion course at East Sydney TAFE NSW, from which he graduated in 2006, having had drawing talents and having been inspired by stylish students on campus.

== Career ==
Lo Sordo began his career in 2006. He worked as a visual merchandiser for Italian fashion designer Giorgio Armani.

== In popular culture ==
His "Alexandra" gown (which has since been called the Bond 007 Paloma Maxi Dress), a navy silk-satin maxi dress with a plunging neckline and slit, served as the costume of Paloma (Ana de Armas) in the James Bond film No Time to Die (2021). Costume designer Suttirat Larlarb requested 10 of them for the film, although he was not told it would be a James Bond film ahead of time. The dress had also been worn by Margot Robbie at the premiere of I, Tonya (2017), and by Australian model Charlee Fraser at the No Time to Die premiere accompanied by the designer himself. The dress became so popular, it sold out multiple times on luxury retailer Net-a-Porter. A bridal version of the dress was worn in the Emmy Award-winning series finale of the Canadian sitcom Schitt's Creek.
