= GlamCorner =

- Company type: Privately held company
- Website type: Online Fashion
- Founded: 2012; 14 years ago
- Headquarters: Sydney, {{{location_country}}}
- Area served: Australia
- Key people: Dean Jones (Co-Founder & CEO); Audrey Khaing-Jones (Co-Founder & COO)
- Industry: E-commerce, Clothing, Fashion, Accessories
- Website: www.glamcorner.com.au

GlamCorner is an online service that provides designer fashion rentals for women in Australia. The company was founded in 2012 and based in Sydney.

The company rents out dresses, gowns, playsuits, jumpsuits, jackets, and accessories.

In April 2015, GlamCorner received investment from AirTree Ventures, a Sydney-based VC-fund specialising in businesses that are disrupting traditional markets.

In July 2017, GlamCorner raised series A from AirTree Ventures, Sass & Bide co-founder Sarah-Jane Clarke, Marshall Investments, Impact Investment Group's Giant Leap and Partners For Growth.

== Achievements & Milestones ==
- GlamCorner is a certified B Corporation in January 2018
- GlamCorner accepted the Banksia Foundation's Sustainability Award for medium-sized businesses at their 2018 Annual Awards Gala in Melbourne.
