= Discovery Expedition (clothing) =

Clothing brand

- Industry: Clothing
- Founded: South Korea (2012)
- Headquarters: Seoul, South Korea
- Number of locations: 120+ stores (2016)
- Website: Official website

Discovery Expedition is a South Korean clothing brand. As of 2016, the chain had over 120 retail stores in South Korea.
