= Fenty Beauty =

Cosmetics brand launched by Rihanna

Fenty Beauty LLC

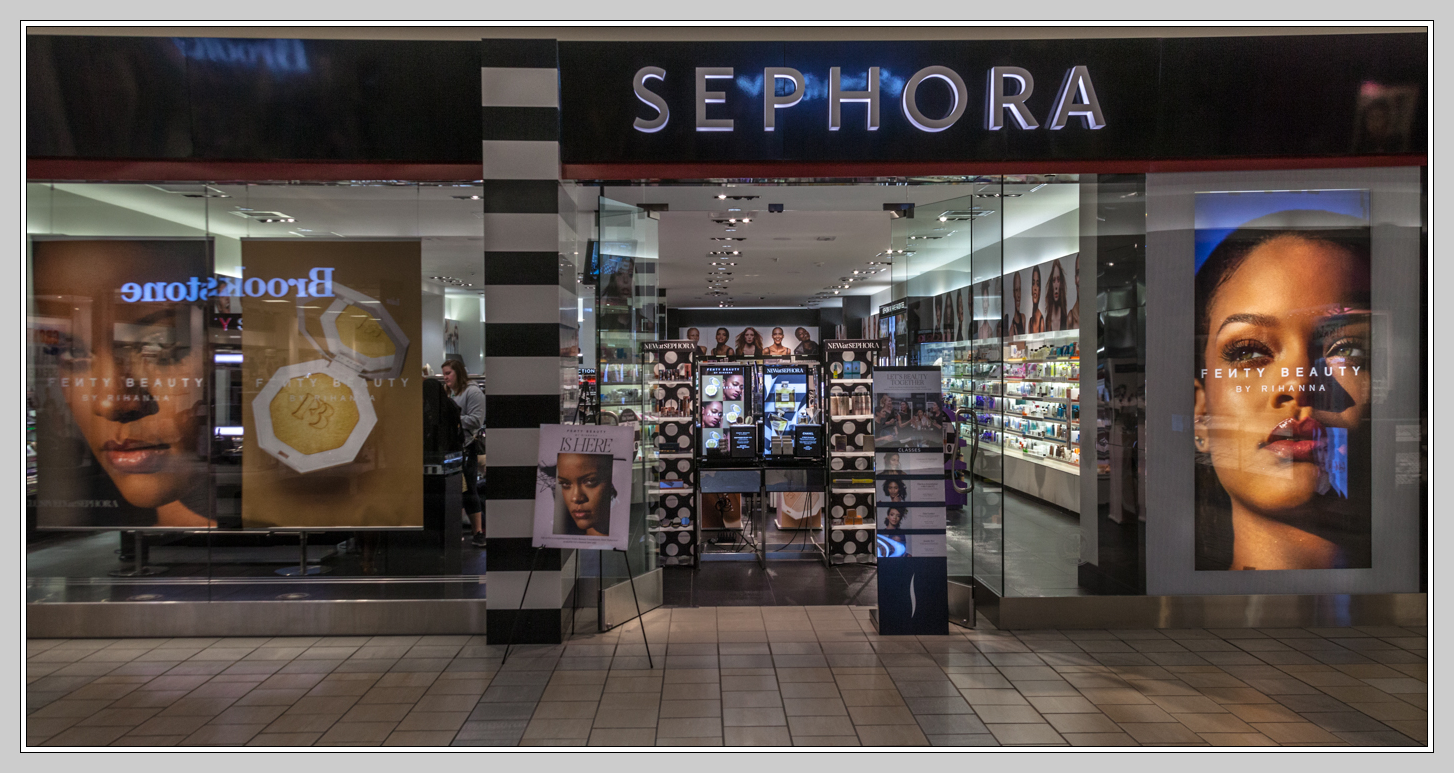
- A Fenty Beauty display at Sephora on September 23, 2017, shortly after launch
- Industry: Cosmetics
- Founded: September 8, 2017; 9 years ago
- Founder: Rihanna
- Headquarters: 425 Market Street, 19th Floor, San Francisco, California, United States
- Area served: Worldwide
- Key people: Rihanna (CEO); Jahleel Weaver & Etinosa Igiebor (creative director)
- Products: Cosmetics
- Owner: Rihanna (50%); LVMH (50%)
- Number of employees: 200
- Parent: Kendo Holdings; LVMH; Fenty Corp
- Website: fentybeauty.com

Fenty Beauty LLC (stylized as FEИTY BEAUTY) is a cosmetics brand by singer Rihanna and luxury goods conglomerate LVMH, launched on September 8, 2017. Popular for its broad inclusivity across various skin tones, its Pro Filt'R foundation became in high-demand upon its first release.

== Background ==
In June 2014, Rihanna trademarked her surname, Fenty, for use on various products, leading to speculation that she would begin working on endeavors other than her music. Fenty Beauty was among these new trademarks.

Rihanna launched Fenty Beauty in 2017, when she was 29 years old. Previously, she had collaborated with MAC Cosmetics, as well as released 10 fragrances via Parlux Ltd, but Fenty Beauty was her first solo cosmetics brand. She developed the line with luxury conglomerate Louis Vuitton Moët Hennessey (LVMH), signing a deal in 2016, to produce Fenty Beauty through LVMH's Kendo division. Kendo Holdings, Inc is an "incubator" company that manufactures cosmetics as white-label products for sale through cosmetics retailer Sephora, another LVMH subsidiary, as well as other outlets. Women's Wear Daily reported that LVMH may have paid $10 million (USD) for the agreement, which followed Kendo deals to produce Marc Jacobs Beauty and Kat Von D Beauty lines.

Rihanna created Fenty Beauty to provide an inclusive range for all skin tones, including extensive shade offerings for people with deeper skin tones, thus adding items to fill the void of products that performed across all skin tones and types.

== History ==
=== Launch ===
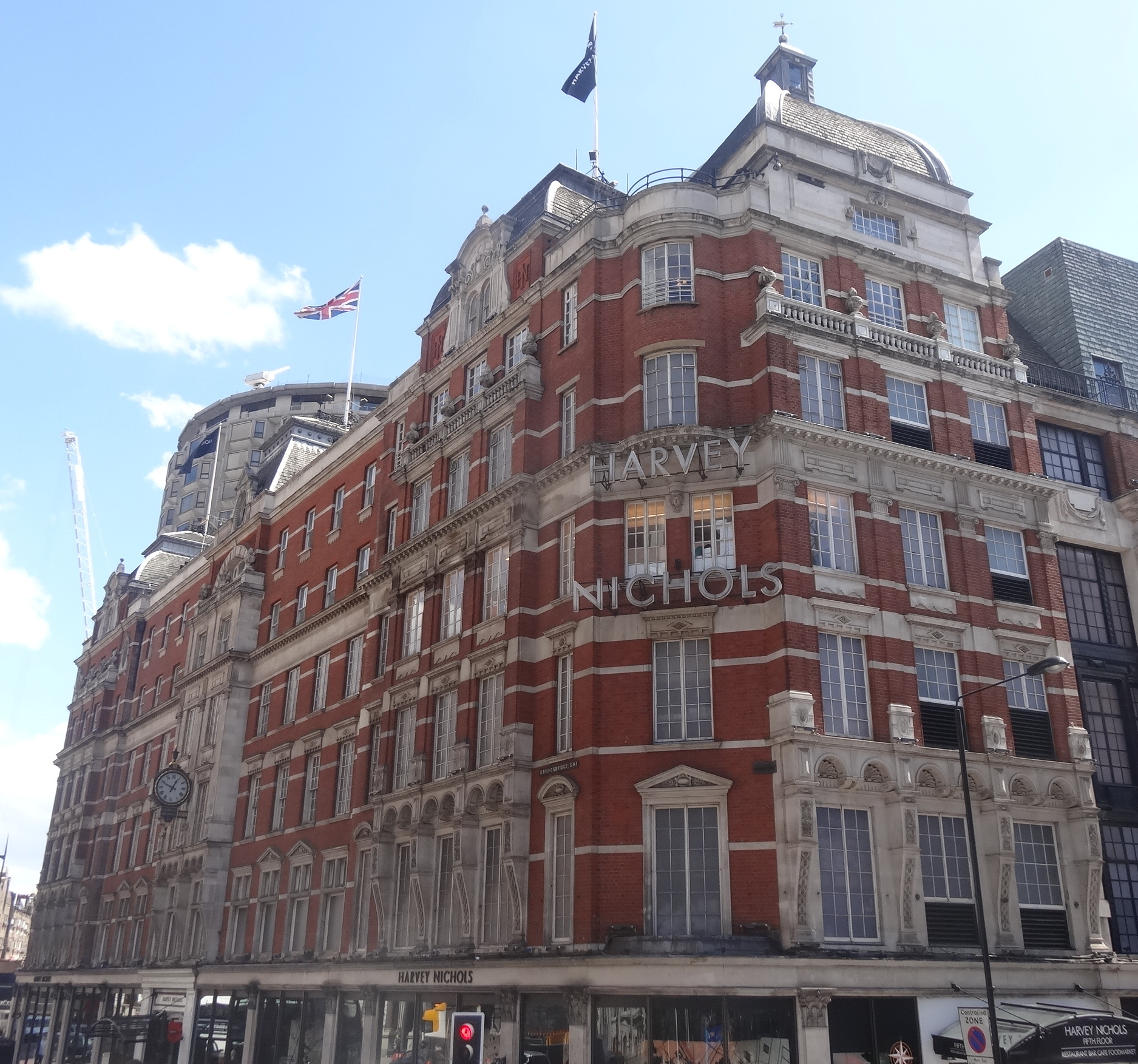
In the UK, Fenty Beauty was initially exclusive to Harvey Nichols department stores.

Fenty Beauty's first products went on sale on September 8, 2017. The launch coincided with Rihanna's collaboration with Puma during New York Fashion Week. In the United States, the line launched in Sephora stores, on the Sephora website, and on Fenty Beauty's website. In the United Kingdom, Fenty Beauty was exclusive to Harvey Nichols department stores until May 2019, where the line would also become available in the high street chemist Boots UK. Currently, Fenty Beauty is available in 17 countries.

=== 2017–2019 ===
Fenty Beauty products have drawn universal acclaim for the range of shades offered, particularly for the inclusion of darker shades for its Pro Filt'R foundation, addressing a long-criticized gap in cosmetic industry offerings for black women and other women of color. Many brands soon followed Fenty's example after their initial release and added more inclusive shades to their own collections. Subsequent launches of new products and lines have been widely criticized for their lack of inclusive shades and overall failure to meet the new standards set by Fenty Beauty, such as Kim Kardashian's line KKW Beauty, Tarte's Shape Tape Foundation, and Benefit's Hello Happy Foundation.

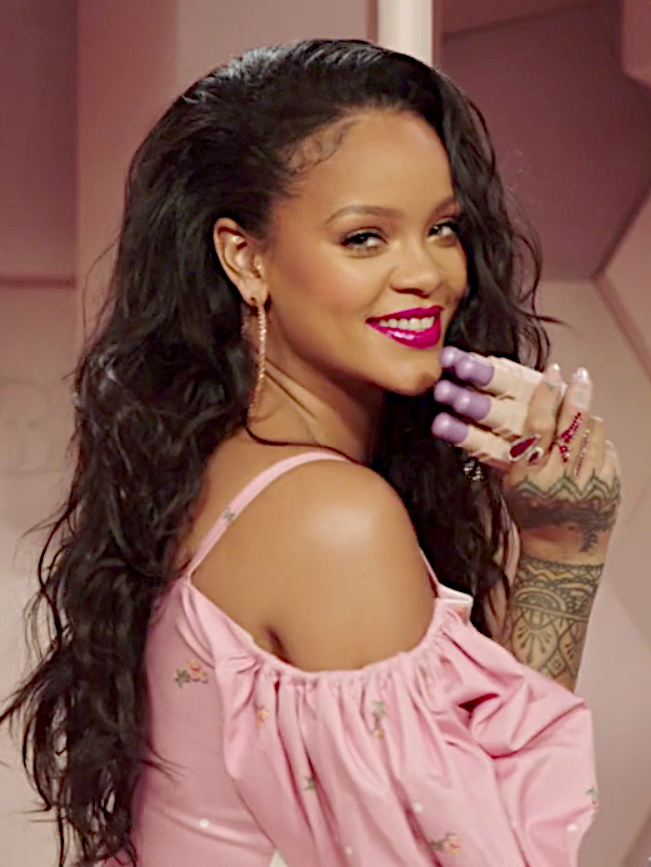
Rihanna in a promotional campaign for Fenty in 2018

On November 23, 2017, the first Stunna Lip Paint, a red long-wear liquid lipstick, was released, drawing broad enthusiasm. Reviewing the product at BuzzFeed News, Leticia Miranda noted the history of controversy around red lipstick for women of color, stating the context made the choice of color for Stunna "assertive, confrontational, unapologetic". Following the release of the original red Stunna Lip Paint, Fenty Beauty released four more lip paints in baby pink, peach nude, chocolate brown, and black.

On March 23, 2018, the brand launched a limited-edition highlighter called, "Dirty Thirty", for Rihanna's 30th birthday. Taken from the line's popular Killawatt Freestyle Highlighter "Trophy Wife" (metallic gold), "Dirty Thirty" was packaged with XXX (the Roman numerals for 30) instead of the brand's FB logo.

On April 6, 2018, Fenty Beauty released three products in its Beach, Please collection. Fenty Beauty's first body product "Body Lava", a liquid product that could be buffed into any part of the body for illumination. To apply the Body Lava, the Kabuki Brush is available for purchase separately. Meanwhile, the Fairy Bomb Glittering Pom Pom is both applicator and product: the vanilla-coconut scented pom pom was packed with rose gold glitter designed to fit all skin tones. Shortly after the luminizer products were released, Fenty Beauty launched in Saudi Arabia.

On October 4, 2018, Fenty Beauty launched their winter collection "ChillOwt", which included a variety of winter-themed and cool-toned products. This collection included the Killawatt Foil Palette (highlighter palette with seven metallic shades), "Snow Daze" and "Snow Nights" (two lipstick sets), and sets of crayons for lip and eye and "Avalanche Powders" (loose pigmented powder).

On January 11, 2019, Fenty Beauty launched Pro Filt’r Instant Retouch Concealer in 50 shades. Additionally, the Pro Filt’r Foundation added 10 new shades, with the concealer and foundation shades corresponding with the same number. The Pro Filt’r Instant Retouch Setting Powder (setting powder product) was also released in eight translucent shades, as well as a series of beauty tools, including Powder Puff Setting Brush 170, Precision Concealer Brush 180, and Lil Precision Makeup Sponge Duo 105.

=== 2020–present ===
On February 17, 2022, Rihanna announced that Ulta Beauty stores would begin carrying Fenty Beauty products beginning March 6, 2022. On May 10, 2022, Rihanna announced that Fenty Beauty would be available in 8 African countries, Ghana, Kenya, Botswana, South Africa, Namibia, Nigeria, Zambia, and Zimbabwe on May 27, 2022. In August 2022, Madison Beer was announced as the latest ambassador of Fenty Beauty joining Madison Bailey, Kane Lim, and Nikita Kering.

In 2023, Fenty Beauty provided experiences within Roblox, including user-creation of their own Fenty products. On October 1, 2023, Fenty Beauty began being sold at Ulta Beauty inside Target stores. On April 1, 2024, Rihanna announced that Fenty Beauty would be launching in mainland China.

In 2025, Fenty Beauty and Fenty Skin have announced a partnership with the WNBA team New York Liberty, marking their first official team sponsorship. The collaboration includes branding on team apparel and in-arena activations, aligning with both parties' commitments to diversity, empowerment, and community engagement.

== Pricing ==
The initial products released by Fenty Beauty were seen as reasonably priced (compared to other prestige brands) and accessible to a broad range of consumers, following Rihanna's approach to her fragrance releases.

== Marketing ==
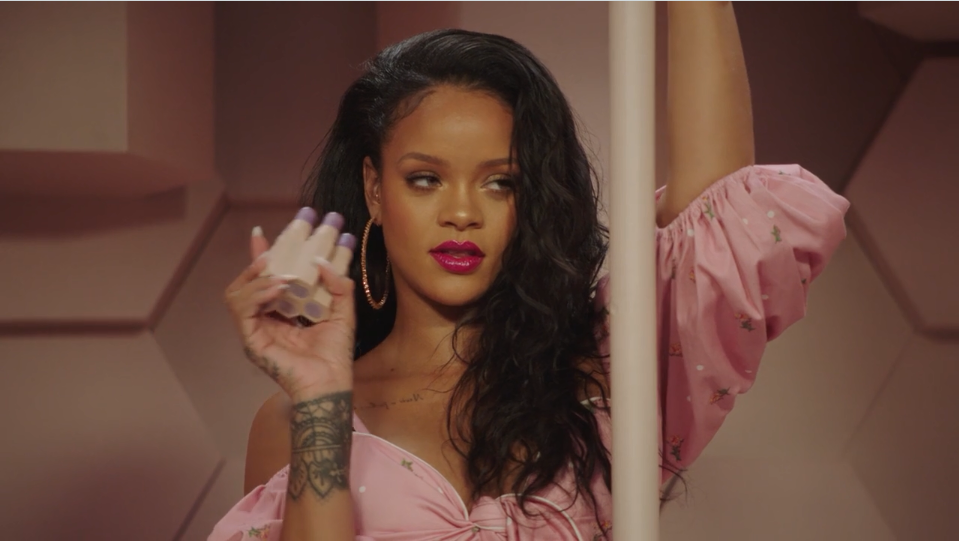
Rihanna in a promotional video for Fenty Beauty in 2018

In the brand's first month, Fenty Beauty recorded $72.0 million in earned media value, ahead of other high-profile brands including Kylie Cosmetics, Benefit, Urban Decay, KKW Beauty and, NYX. Also in the brand's first month, Fenty Beauty-related content received 132 million views on YouTube.

In February 2018, Fenty Beauty released an ad featuring rapper Saweetie that showed a group of women getting ready to attend the Super Bowl. The spot drew enthusiasm for its send-up of the award-winning 1990s Budweiser ad campaign "Whassup" (in which a group of men acknowledged one another only by repeating an intoxicatedly slurred "What's up?" over and over), but the Fenty version also attracted some criticism as the women greeted each other in "Whassup"-style drawl with the word "bitch".

Rihanna performed at the 2023 Super Bowl Halftime Show where she featured Fenty Beauty to touch up her makeup. The feature reportedly earned the brand $5.6 million within 12 hours.

=== Diversity ===
As with the product line, Fenty Beauty also drew international acclaim for diversity in its advertising campaign, which prominently featured numerous Black models and other models of color. Faces of the initial Fenty Beauty campaign included Slick Woods, Halima Aden, Leomie Anderson, Indyamarie Jean, Paloma Elsesser, Selena Forrest, Camila Costa, and Duckie Thot. Soon after Rihanna released the line, other brands such as Make Up For Ever and L'Oréal started ad campaigns aimed at women of color.

Fenty Beauty has embraced makeup use across gender lines, producing an ad in March 2018, called "My Fenty, My Mood", in which Instagram star and comedian Kway plays his comic character Titi promoting the brand. Also in March 2018, Daniel Kaluuya, nominated for the Academy Award for Best Actor for his starring role in Get Out, appeared on the Oscar red carpet wearing Fenty Beauty's Pro Filt'R Foundation (specifically, shades 480 and 490). Time magazine described him as looking "luminous"; in the UK edition of The Huffington Post, Patricia Ekall said his "dewy glow brought the "no-makeup-makeup look" to another level." Several outlets noted men's use of makeup was "not unusual", but said the news nevertheless "pleasantly surprised" fans.

Rihanna has drawn some criticism for failing to cast transgender models in Fenty Beauty campaigns. In response, she invoked a desire to avoid tokenism and respect privacy, stating:

"...worked with many gifted trans women throughout the years. However, I don't go around doing trans castings! Just like I don't do straight non-trans women castings! I respect all women, and whether they're trans or not is none of my business! It's personal and some trans women are more comfortable being open about it than others so I have to respect that as a woman myself! I don't think it's fair that a trans woman, or man, be used as a convenient marketing tool!"

Fenty Beauty made a sponsored post on Instagram with transgender model Rose Montoya. They later partnered with transgender model and social media influencer Emira D'Spain.

== Sales ==
Within one month of release, Fenty Beauty's sales were valued at $72 million, and sold-out products were widely reported, with darker shades of foundation particularly in demand (shoppers noted even testers were often gone from stores). In the UK, the line became Harvey Nichols's biggest beauty launch ever (passing previous leader MAC Cosmetics): in September the department stores sold one Fenty Beauty foundation every minute and one lipstick every three minutes. The launch also helped raise LVMH's cosmetic and perfume sales for the third quarter of 2017 by 17%.

According to LVMH executive Bernard Arnault, Fenty Beauty's sales reached almost 500 million euros ($573 million) by the end of 2018. Forbes reported that following 15 months of operation, in 2018, Fenty Beauty accumulated US$570 million in revenue. The entire operation is worth US$2.8 billion, of which 50% belongs to its CEO, Rihanna.

== Awards ==
Fenty Beauty was named to Time magazine's list of the 25 best inventions of 2017. Time cited Fenty Beauty's 40-shade range of foundations that quickly sold out.

Fenty Beauty also won the WWD Beauty Inc. award in 2017 for launch of the year in the prestige sector.

In 2018, Fenty Beauty also won WWD beauty Digital innovator of the year.

== See also ==
- Haus Labs
- Rare Beauty
- R.E.M. Beauty
