= Nissan Qashqai (first generation) =

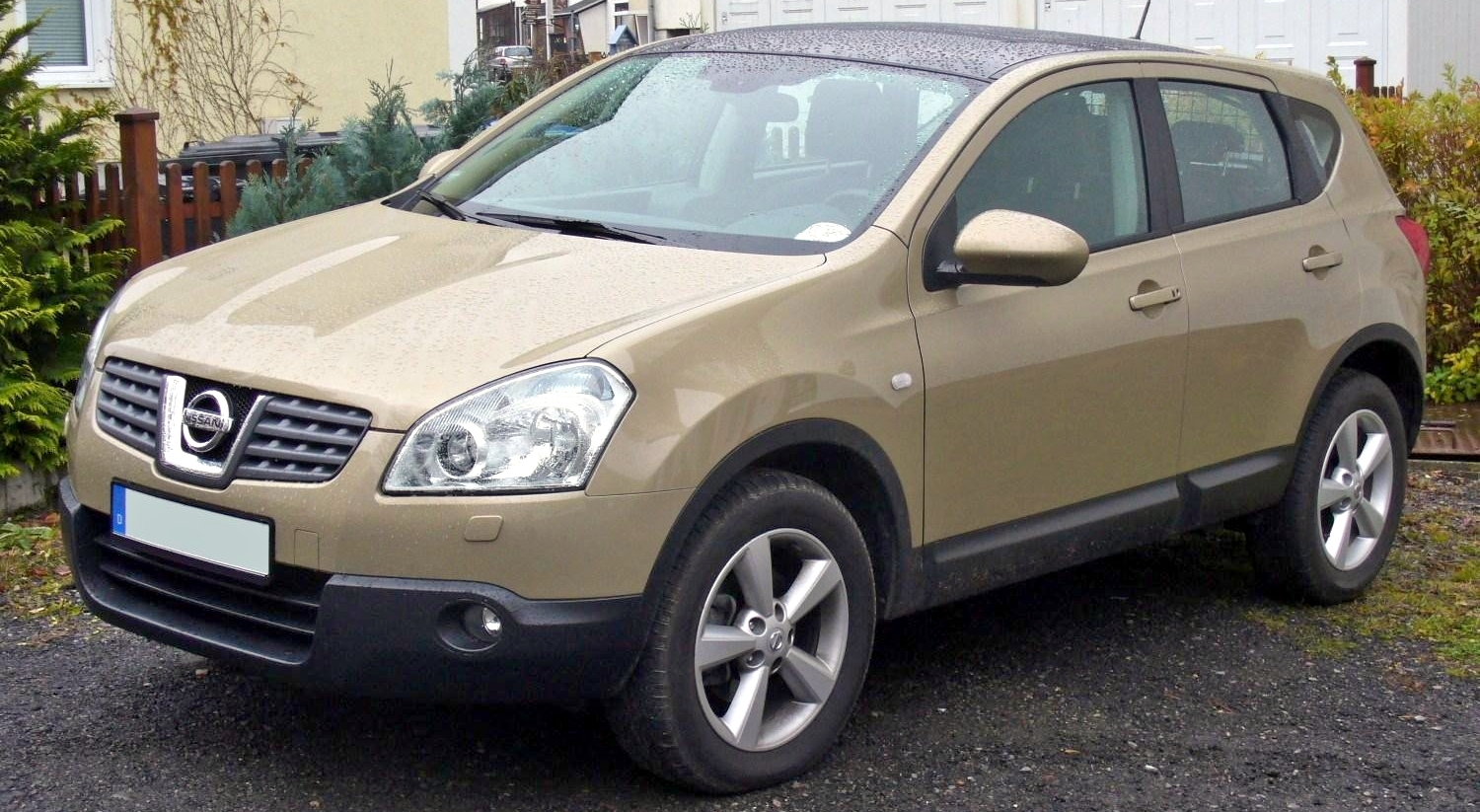
- Pre-facelift model for European markets (2007)

Overview
- Manufacturer: Nissan
- Model code: J10
- Also called: Nissan Dualis (Japan, Australia)
- Production: December 2006 – October 2015
- Assembly: United Kingdom: Sunderland (NMUK); Japan: Kanda, Fukuoka; China: Xiangfan (Dongfeng Nissan)
- Designer: Stefan Schwarz

Body and chassis
- Class: Compact SUV
- Body style: 5-door crossover SUV
- Layout: Transverse front-engine, front-wheel drive; Longitudinal front-engine, all-wheel drive
- Platform: Nissan C platform
- Related: Nissan X-Trail; Renault Megane

Powertrain
- Engine: Petrol: 1.6 L HR16DE I4; 2.0 L MR20DE I4; Diesel: 1.5 L K9K I4 turbo; 1.6 L R9M I4 turbo; 2.0 L M9R I4 turbo
- Transmission: 5-speed manual 6-speed manual 6-speed automatic CVT

Dimensions
- Wheelbase: 2,630 mm (103.5 in); 2,760 mm (108.7 in) (Qashqai+2)
- Length: 4,315 mm (169.9 in); 4,535 mm (178.5 in) (Qashqai+2)
- Width: 1,785 mm (70.3 in)
- Height: 1,605 mm (63.2 in)

Chronology
- Successor: Nissan Qashqai (second generation)

The Nissan Qashqai (first generation) (known as the Nissan Dualis in Australia and Japan and as the Nissan Xiaoke in China) is a compact SUV that was produced by Japanese carmaker Nissan from December 2006 to October 2015. Designed by a team led by Stefan Schwarz, the Qashqai is widely regarded as one of the first urban crossovers and the first Nissan developed almost entirely in Europe. Development began in 2002 to replace the poorly marketed second-generation Almera. Two years later, a concept was presented at the Geneva Motor Show. The production version was presented in September 2006 at the Paris Motor Show, and sales began in Europe and the Middle East in 2007. By 2009, the Qashqai was also sold in South Africa, China, Japan, Australia and New Zealand.

The Qashqai was initially only a five-seat model, until a longer seven-seat version named Qashqai+2 launched in Europe in September 2008. Both were facelifted in 2010, featuring a sportier exterior design. By this time, the vehicle was a global success, reaching its one millionth car sold in May 2011. Production in Sunderland, United Kingdom, ended in March 2014, when a second-generation model was introduced. Subsequently, production ended in Japan in 2014 and in China in 2015. Total cumulative sales reached 2 million by 2014, making the Qashqai a great success for Nissan, which helped it earn the nickname "cash cow".

== Development ==
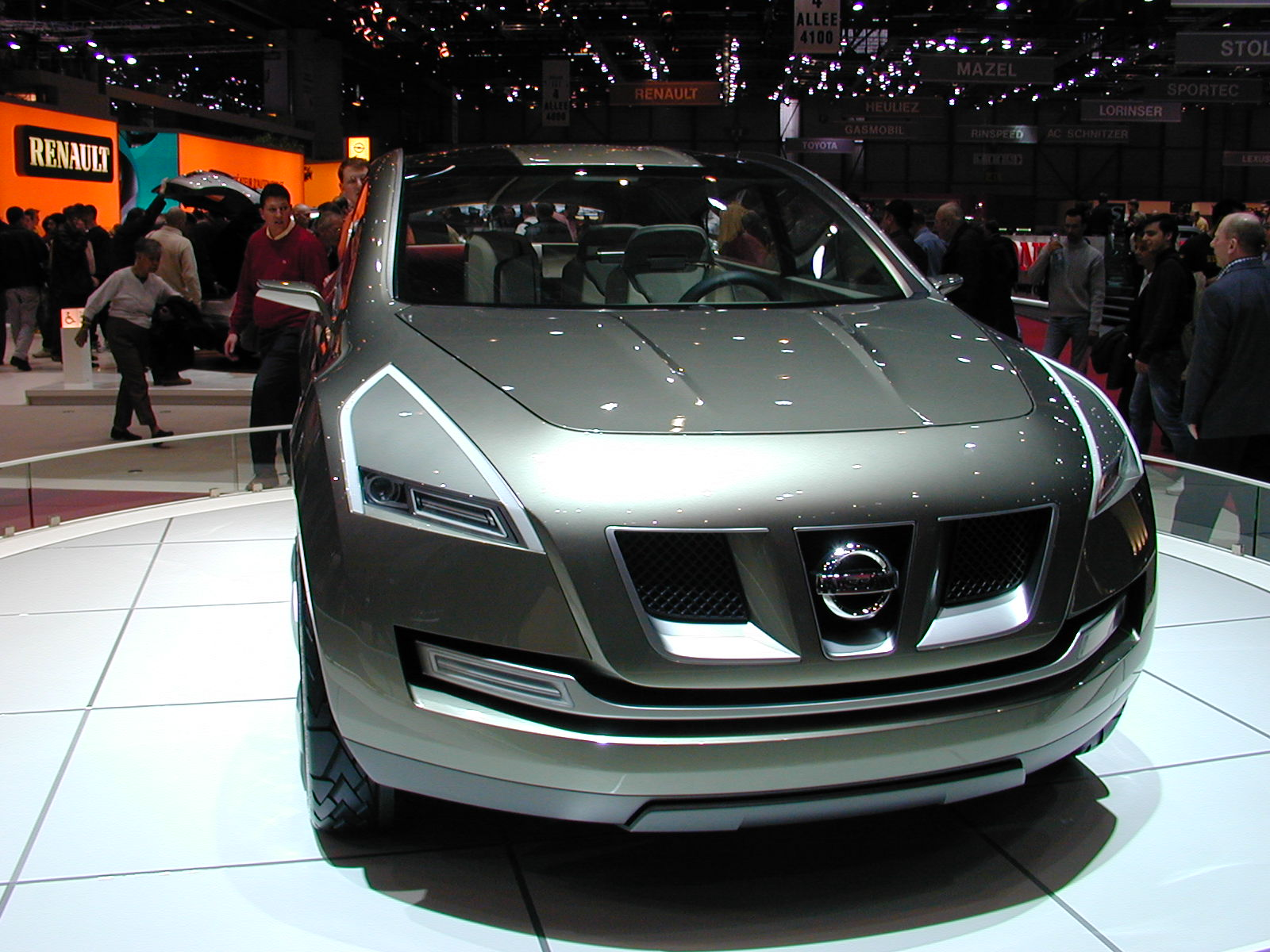
Qashqai concept car (2004)

In March 2002, a 25-member engineer team of Nissan Technical Centre in Japan assembled to discuss a project of the successor model to its vehicle Almera, which proved to be a failure on European markets. On December 13, 2002, the team met again to show the results of an 8 month-long development process. The result was a compact MPV car that was meant to compete with Volkswagen Golf Plus and SEAT Altea. However, it was calculated that this car would also be a failure for Nissan. As a result, the development of Almera's successor ceased in 2003.

It was decided to come up with a completely different concept: a car with the swiftness, practicality and versatility of an SUV, but with the size, dynamics and expense of a compact family hatchback. At the time, the newly established crossover SUV's were still very different from small hatchbacks and saloons, so this concept was a breakthrough. Designers described the future car as a "mini-Murano", referring to the larger Murano, which was recently released in the United States and Canada. The Qashqai development was part of Nissan's new marketing strategy in Europe: not to produce cars in existing segments, but to create new, more unique cars for new market niches. Prior to the Qashqai, this strategy had been demonstrated by the Note model, a mini MPV which entered the European markets in 2006.

The development of the model continued, initially in Japan. The development mule of the future car was being tested at the Nissan Technical Centre Europe. At the same time, the product planning department was busy considering feedback and opinions from potential SUV and hatchback buyers in order to add new improvements to the new model. The concept of the model was formalized in two words: "urban nomad". The Qashqai was designed by a team from Nissan Design Centre Europe, based in London since January 2003. According to Matt Weaver, then senior designer at the London studio, the concept for the future car was partly inspired by graffiti that the team found during the first visit to their future office, then an abandoned building. The head of the design team was Stefan Schwarz.

By early 2004, testing of early prototypes of the Qashqai had been completed, and the company now had a concept car of the model to show. It premiered on 2 March 2004 at the Geneva Motor Show. The concept inherited some design elements from the Micra, 350Z and Primera models. The Qashqai concept car has rear suicide doors and no centre pillars. The lack of pillars is compensated for by the presence of a large longitudinal centre beam in the cabin. There are four individual seats inside the vehicle. As they are mounted on the centre beam, the seats appear to float above the floor. The interior is designed with white inserts and a double panoramic roof, divided in half by a roof segment in the middle. The controls in the cabin are mainly located on the centre beam segment. The centre console itself contains only a small screen. The instrument panel and buttons are illuminated in orange. The press looked at the concept with scepticism, as they believed that such a car had no place in any segment that existed at the time. Nevertheless, this did not prevent the concept from winning the Design Award from the British Institute of Vehicle Engineers (IVehE) in May 2004.

After the presentation of the concept, it was determined that the production model will replace the Almera and Primera models. In April 2004, Nissan made the first hint about the Qashqai's release, saying that "Murano will go on sale. Qashqai won't... yet". It was announced in February 2005 that the Qashqai (then known by the codename P32L) would be assembled at Nissan's plant in Sunderland, United Kingdom starting from December 2006. In January 2006, the upcoming crossover was tested in Finland, and this was the first time journalists were allowed to see the pre-production model. The Qashqai received very sceptical reviews, as journalists considered the future model to be a failure and uncompetitive if compared to the typical crossovers at the time. Nissan specialists conducted a study that showed that all-wheel drive is not often used by SUV owners, and therefore cannot be a success factor. The total development cost exceeded the €300 million mark, according to Carlos Ghosn. It was decided to keep the concept name for the production model. The name "Qashqai" itself comes from the name of the Qashqai people from the Iranian province of Fars. Initially, some publications misread the car's name as "Quashqai".

During 2006, various leaks and rumours regarding the future model were spreading. In May 2006, the international automotive portal Motor1 published several spy photos of the future crossover, as well as a picture depicting the production Qashqai based on these photos. The same picture was published on RBC's Autonews portal, where it was reported that the Qashqai would compete with the BMW X3. On the same day, Malaysian news portal Paul Tan's Automotive News published another rendering of the future car made by Hans Lechmann, which showed a crossover whose design was copied from the Note and Tiida models. This image was created in March 2006 and has had already managed to appear in an Auto.Mail.Ru article dated March 31, 2006. A more significant leak occurred in August 2006, when the web portal Carscoops posted a spy photo of a production model in red with no camouflage visible from the front. Later the same month, two spy photos, including the above-mentioned one, were published by Autoblog magazine.

== Markets ==
=== Europe ===
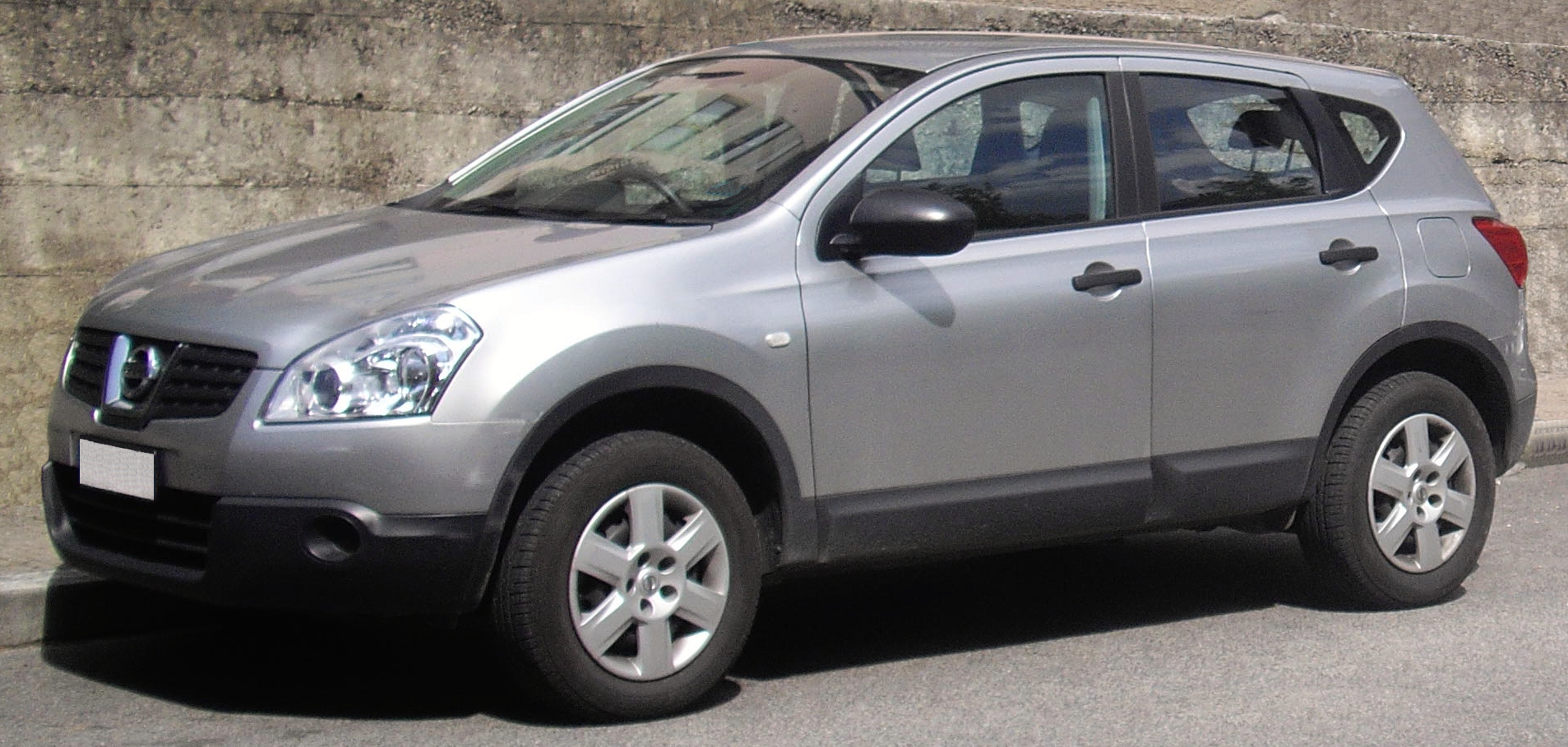
Sunderland-built Qashqai in Visia trim

The production car was first unveiled to the press by Carlos Ghosn on September 6, 2006 at a special presentation event. A larger presentation of the Qashqai for the general public took place three weeks later at the 2006 Paris Motor Show, held from September 30 to October 15, 2006. The company had high hopes for the Qashqai from the very beginning: according to Carlos Ghosn, it was planned to sell an average of about 100,000 cars annually in Europe, and 80 per cent of buyers, according to the company's calculations, were expected to become new customers for Nissan. On October 23, 2006, a themed website was launched at www.nissan-qashqai.co.uk, which allowed the user to make a Qashqai in the configurator and place it against the background of a city location. Serial production of the car in Sunderland began on 5 December 2006, on the production line previously occupied by the Nissan Primera on Line 1 and a percentage of the Almera's line 2. Around 130,000 cars were to be produced annually, of which 80 per cent were to be exported, mainly to Europe. On 16 April 2007, production of cars with a two-litre diesel engine began, by which time the model from the UK had already been exported, in addition to Europe and Russia, to Japan, Australia, South Africa, South America and the Middle East.

On the day the production began, a price list with European model configurations was published: the basic Visia model was priced from £13,499, the mid-range Acenta from £14,999 and the top-of-the-range Tekna from £16,499. The price of the most expensive model was £21,899. On January 25, 2007, the model became available for test drive and pre-orders. Sales of the Qashqai in the United Kingdom began on March 1, 2007 with prices ranging from £13,499 to £22,149. In France the model was offered from January 15, 2007 at an initial price ranging from €18,900 to €31,900. Prices for the model in Germany - from €19,790 to €24,890 - were announced on January 17, 2007, and sales began at the end of February 2007.

During the following months, demand for the model began to grow rapidly, causing the Sunderland plant to gradually increase production volumes of the crossover. Its launch coincided with the withdrawal of the Primera from the UK market due to low sales. This left Nissan with no direct successor to the Almera or Primera on the UK market, with the "supermini MPV" Note being sold as an indirect successor to the Almera, and the Qashqai as a successor to the Primera. This move was seen as controversial, but in time appears to have paid off as the Qashqai has proved a major sales success in the UK, with more than 39,000 sales in 2010 making it the tenth best selling new car in Britain – the first Nissan to make the top ten in Britain since the Sunny in 1983. In June 2007, Nissan invested a further £2.4 million in the UK facility to increase Qashqai production by 20 per cent. The number of orders for the model in Europe surpassed the 60,000 mark by this time.

By March 2008, exactly one year after the model's launch, more than 148,000 cars had already been sold worldwide. These figures were much higher than expected, so to meet the ever-increasing demand for the Qashqai in Europe, Nissan's Sunderland plant introduced an extra shift. As demand for the model continued to grow in 2008, the Sunderland plant introduced a third shift in June 2008, the plant effectively becoming a 24-hour operation.

In May 2009 Nissan released a special edition of the vehicle called Qashqai n-tec. It was located between Acenta and Tekna in the price range and differed from the others with 18-inch wheels, panoramic roof, tinted rear windows, rails and door handles with silver trim. In the interior, the main difference is the presence of the then-new Nissan Connect infotainment system. The Qashqai n-tec was priced between £17,645 and £24,295 in the UK. In continental Europe, this special edition was known as the Qashqai i-Way. At the 2008 British International Motor Show in July 2008, the Sound & Style model was presented, based on Tekna trim level, the difference being the presence of a Bose audio system and 18-inch light-alloy rims. Sales of the Qashqai Sound & Style began in November 2008. On December 1, 2008, Qashqai Sound & Style went on sale in France, where the model was produced in a limited edition of 1,000 units at a price of €26,615. The French model featured a single Cassis colour, and was otherwise similar to the British version.

In 2012, the Qashqai's sixth year on sale in the UK, sales exceeded 45,000 to make it the sixth best selling car there that year.

==== Russia ====
From March 20, 2007, the Qashqai began to be sold in Russia, but without the panoramic roof option. The stated reason for the lack of a panoramic roof in Russian models was the relatively poor road conditions, which could cause the glass to crack. Nevertheless, cars from many other brands were offered with panoramic roofs at the time with no such problems being reported. The Qashqai and Qashqai+2 (seven seat version) were available in Russia with the following petrol-powered four-cylinder engines:

For Qashqai

- 1.6 L — 85 kW (116 PS) 2WD; 5MT and CVT
- 2.0 L — 105 kW (143 PS) 2WD and 4WD; 6MT and CVT

For Qashqai+2

- 1.6 L — 85 kW (116 PS) 2WD; 5MT
- 2.0 L — 105 kW (143 PS) 2WD with 6MT only; 4WD with 6MT or CVT

=== Japan ===
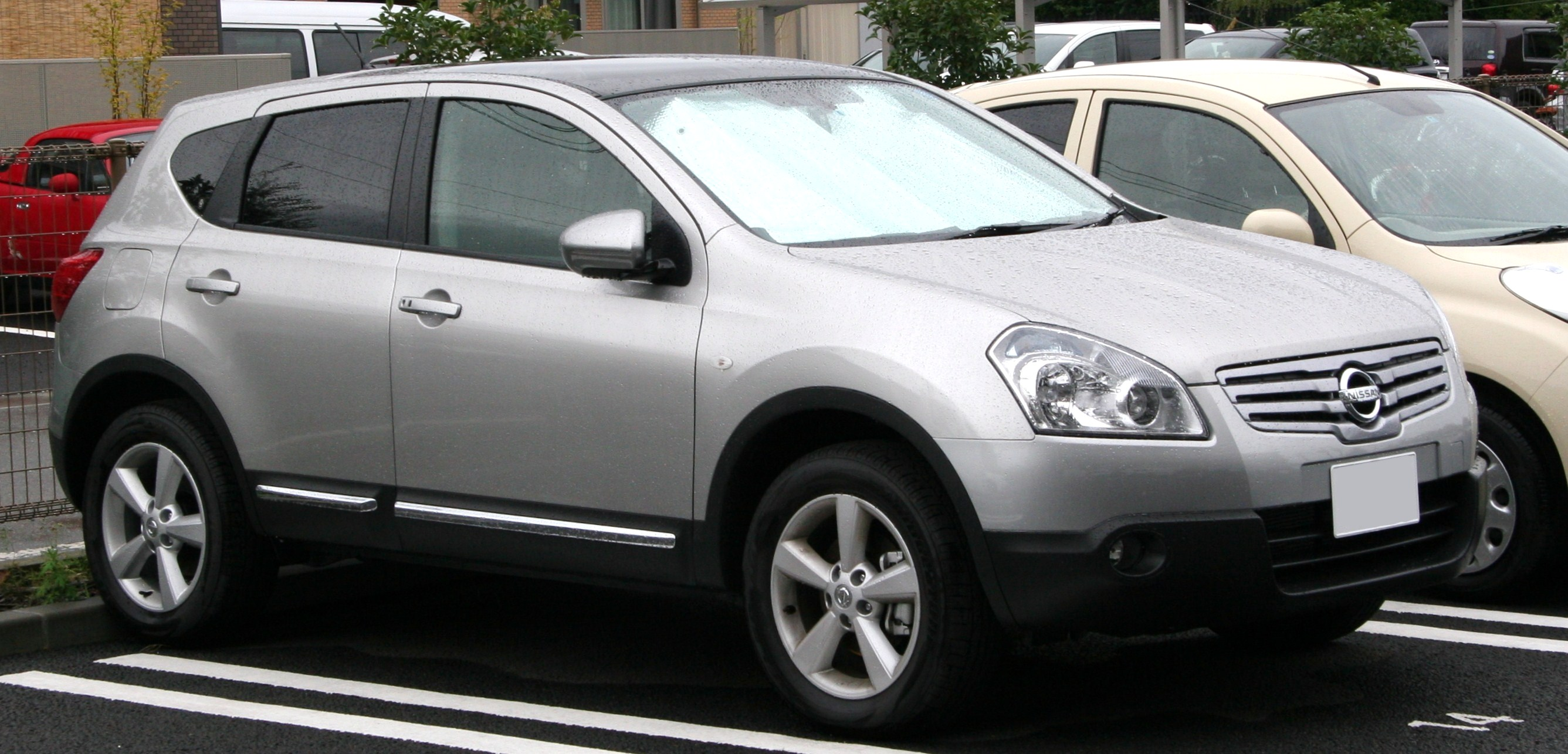
Post-facelift Dualis (2009)

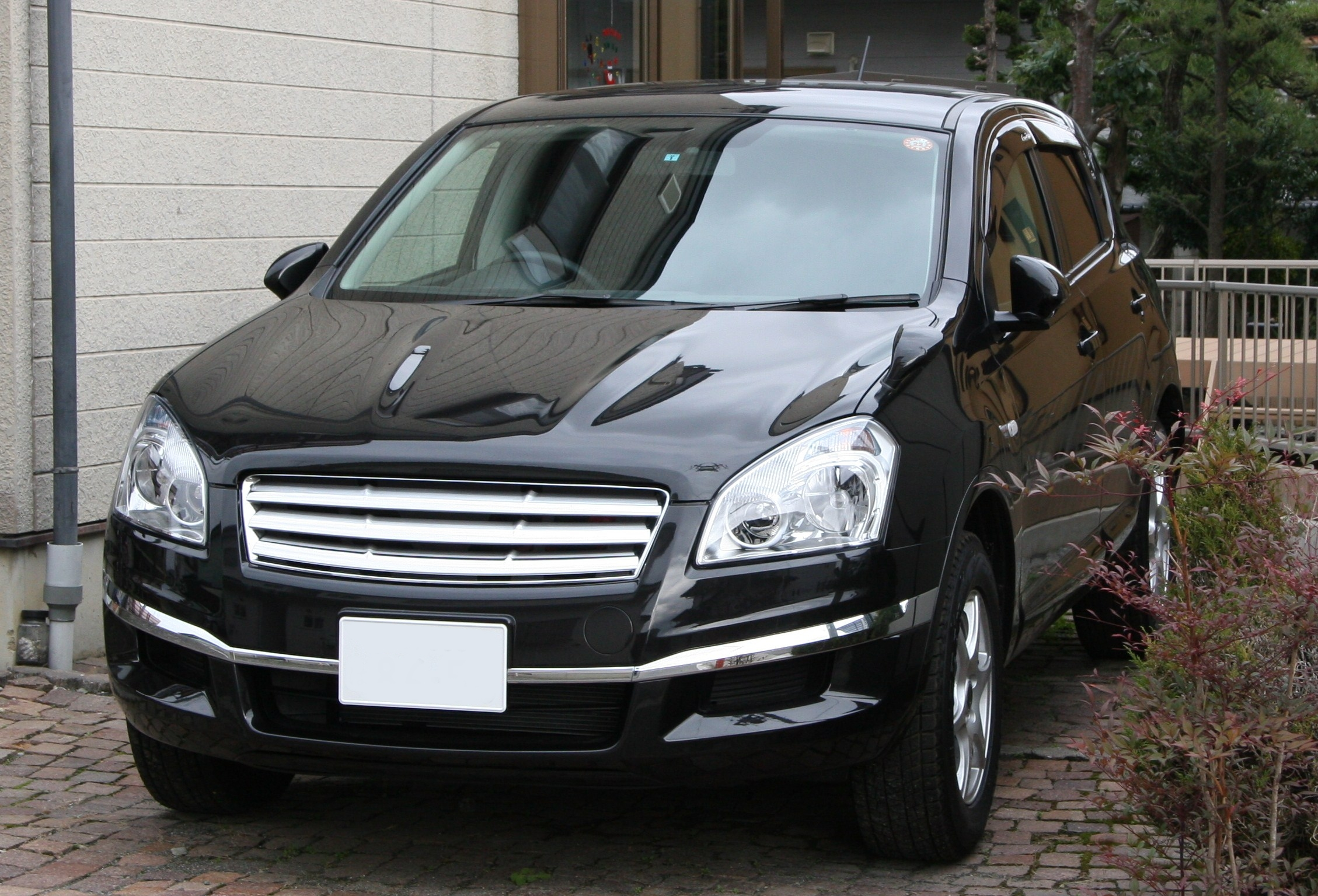
Pre-facelift Dualis CrossRider (2008)

The Sunderland-built model was also exported to Japan until December 2007. The car here was renamed to Nissan Dualis. This name refers to the duality of the driver's life: an "on" (active and busy) and "off" (quiet) life, the car fits both options at once. The main reason for the name change is the difficulty in pronouncing the word "Qashqai" in Japanese. Export of the car to Japan began on March 2, 2007, and sales there began on May 22 or 23, with prices ranging from 1,953,000 to 2,430,750 yen. All cars sold in Japan were exclusively equipped with a two-litre petrol engine coupled to a continuously variable transmission. Initially it was planned to sell about 2000 cars per month, but one week after the start of sales for the model received more than 5000 orders.

The Japanese domestic market Dualis was offered in 2.0 G, 2.0 S, 2.0 G Four, and 2.0 S Four trim levels. All models are powered by 2.0-litre MR20DE engine matched to six-speed Xtronic CVT. The Dualis was discontinued in Japan on 31 March 2014, after which the Juke was the only Nissan's mini SUV still produced and sold in Japan until 2019.

Since the plant in Sunderland could not meet with the ever-increasing demand for Qashqai in both Europe and Japan, in August 2007 it was decided to move the production of the Japanese model from the UK to Japan itself. From December 2007 or January 2008, the Dualis was assembled at a rate of 24,000 cars per year at the local Nissan Kyushu Plant, located in Kanda, Fukuoka Prefecture. The car underwent a minor restyling in September 2009. The Dualis received a new grille (similar to the Qashqai+2 grille in Europe), and side chrome door covers and fog lamps became standard equipment. In the interior, beige seats and HDD Carwings navigation system became available as options for the 20G and 20G FOUR trims. The updated model went on sale on 8 September 2009 with prices ranging from 2,084,250 to 2,504,250 yen.

Various special editions of the car were produced for the Japanese market. The first was the Dualis Urban Flare, based on the 20G and 20G FOUR models, sold from May 5, 2008 to November 2008. The driver's seat has lumbar support, while the passenger seat has an ottoman (with a footrest). The price for the 20G-based model was 2,273,250 yen, while the price for the 20G FOUR-based model was 2,483,250 yen. On December 19, 2008, another special version, named Dualis Urban Brown Leather, was released. It featured different interior colors, brown leather seats and different door armrests. New equipment includes heated front seats and lumbar support for the driver's seat. The price was 2,483,250 yen for the front-wheel drive model and 2,693,250 yen for the all-wheel drive model. On January 7, 2010, a similar special version was released based on the 20G and 20G FOUR trims, called Dualis Urban Black Leather and featuring black leather seats and the same door armrests from the European version. The front seats are heated and the passenger seat reverted to an ottoman format. Three body colours were available: Met Black Metallic, Diamond Silver Metallic and Reddish Copper Metallic. The price was 2,556,750 yen for the 20G model and 2,766,750 yen for the 20G FOUR.

In January 2008, a concept of a tuned version called the Dualis Premium Concept, was unveiled at the 2008 Tokyo Motor Show by Nissan subsidiary Autech. On 9 September 2008, a production model based on the concept, called the Dualis CrossRider, went on sale. It is based on the 20S trim and features a new front bumper and grille, as well as an exclusive Fujitsubo Giken muffler. In the interior, the seat upholstery is made of alcantara. In the chassis, the suspension has been lowered and the discs have been replaced with exclusive 17-inch discs. The model was priced at launch at 2,394,000 yen for the front-wheel-drive version and 2,604,000 yen for the all-wheel-drive version.

=== China ===
On March 12, 2008, the assembly of the model in China started at the Dongfeng plant in Huadu, Guangzhou. In this country, Qashqai received a name Nissan Xiaoke. For the Chinese market, only the model with a two-litre MR20DE petrol engine was offered in combination with a manual transmission or with a variator. The car also received some changes: the colour of the seat upholstery was changed from black to beige, the panoramic roof was slightly redesigned, and the doors received chrome trim. The Xiaoke was priced between 167,800 and 219,800 yuan at launch. The first-generation Qashqai was never sold in the United States and Canada. Instead, a larger model called the Nissan Rogue was available there starting from 2007. Although both models are built on the same platform, they are mostly unrelated, although they are sometimes mistaken for being the same car.

=== Australia ===
Following the crossover's unveiling in September 2006, Lenora Fletcher, Nissan Australia spokeswoman, stated that Qashqai deliveries to Australia may begin in late 2007 or early 2008. The Australian model, named Dualis as in Japan, was first unveiled in March 2007 at the Melbourne Motor Show alongside the Micra and 350Z models, and then in October 2007 at the Sydney International Motor Show. Following the second presentation, prices for the model were released, ranging from $28,990 to $35,990. Sales of the Dualis in Australia began in December 2007. For the first two years, the Dualis was available on the Australian market only with all-wheel drive, and the front-wheel drive model was not available until August 5, 2009. It was available, like its all-wheel drive counterpart, in two trim levels - ST and Ti. The price ranged from $24,990 to $27,490. The reason for the model's name change in the Australian market was slightly different than in Japan - when the model was shown at the Paris Motor Show in 2006, Australian journalists gave it the nickname "cash cow".

=== New Zealand ===
In May 2009, the Qashqai went on sale in New Zealand in the ST and Ti models. Unlike in Australia, the New Zealand version of the model retained the Qashqai name, partly to distinguish the model from Dualis grey imports, which had been brought over from Japan before the official release. Peter Merry, head of marketing for Nissan's New Zealand division, called the Dualis name meaningless. The New Zealand model was initially assembled in Japan; they were sourced from the UK plant from August 2009. New Zealand-imported Qashqais were front-wheel drive and equipped with a two-litre petrol engine coupled to a CVT. As of 2016 the range consisted of three specification levels: ST, ST-L and Ti, all with 2WD 2.0L MR20DE CVT. A TS model (1.6 diesel) was also available. The Qashqai+2 was added to the range in July 2010 but discontinued with the new model launch in 2014. The updated X-Trail (Rogue in United States), released at about the same time, became the only seven-seater option.

=== South Africa ===
In October 2006, the Qashqai was shown at the Auto Africa show held in South Africa. At the same time, Nissan's South African division announced the start of Qashqai sales in South Africa from the third quarter of 2007. Sales of the model began in December 2007.

=== Middle East ===
In some Middle Eastern markets, the first-generation Qashqai was offered in S, SE and LE, Standard on all trims is the 2.0-litre 106 kW (142 bhp) MR20DE engine with CVT.

== Safety ==
On 13 September 2012, Nissan recalled 51,000 cars worldwide to investigate a reported steering wheel problem. It affected the Qashqai, Qashqai+2 and NV200 models.

Euro NCAP test results* Nissan Qashqai 1.6 'Visia' 2WD (LHD) (2007)
Test	Score	Rating
Adult occupant:	37	5 /5 stars
Child occupant:	40	4 /5 stars
Pedestrian:	18	2 /4 stars

ANCAP test results* Nissan Dualis variants with dual frontal airbags (2007)
Test	Score
Overall	4 /5 stars
Frontal offset	15.83/16
Side impact	16/16
Pole	Not Assessed
Seat belt reminders	0/3
Whiplash protection	Not Assessed
Pedestrian protection	Marginal
Electronic stability control	Optional

ANCAP test results* Nissan Dualis variants with side & curtain airbags (2007)
Test	Score
Overall	5 /5 stars
Frontal offset	15.83/16
Side impact	16/16
Pole	2/2
Seat belt reminders	0/3
Whiplash protection	Not Assessed
Pedestrian protection	Marginal
Electronic stability control	Optional
