= Oyster (magazine) =

Australian magazine

- Categories: Fashion, culture, music, lifestyle
- Frequency: Quarterly
- Founded: 1994
- Country: Australia
- Based in: Sydney
- Language: English
- Website: www.oystermag.com
- ISSN: 1322-6495

Oyster was an international fashion, beauty, music and pop-culture title published in Australia from 1994 to 2019 by Monica Nakata and Jonathan Morris.

The magazine features exclusive international fashion editorial, interviews, and extensive music and art editorial. Oyster showcases the work of leading photographers and young up-and-coming talent from around the world, and is renowned for its avant-garde approach to style.

From 1994 to 2012 Oyster was published bi-monthly. It was announced in 2015 that the frequency would change from bi-annual to quarterly print publication.

The last print edition was published in 2019, it continued digital only until 2021.

== Oystermag.com ==
Oystermag.com was established in 2006 and offers extended content from the magazine, online fashion and beauty shoots, interviews and daily pop-culture news.
