= Nüyou =

Bilingual fashion and beauty magazine in Singapore

- Cover of Malaysia edition dated February 2020 featuring Hannah Quinlivan
- Categories: Fashion magazine
- Frequency: Monthly
- Publisher: SPH Magazines
- Founded: 1976
- Country: Singapore
- Language: English; Chinese
- Website: nuyou.com.sg
- ISSN: 0219-8150

Nüyou (Chinese: 女友; lit. 'Female Friend') is a bilingual (English and Chinese) monthly fashion and beauty magazine targeting women. The magazine is based in Singapore.

== History and profile ==
Nüyou was started in 1976. The magazine is part of SPH Magazines and is published on a monthly basis. It covers articles about fashion, beauty tips and celebrities and targets women between the ages of 25 and 30 years-old. The magazine is published in English and Chinese languages.

In April 2013 Terence Lee became the editor-in-chief of Nüyou. He replaced Grace Lee in the aforementioned post.

In 2009 Nüyou was redesigned. The magazine had a Malaysian edition which was belong to Blu Inc Media Sdn Bhd. The company ceased operations since the Malaysian movement control order due to the COVID-19 pandemic which interfered with distribution of the magazine.
