= Style: (magazine) =

Singaporean magazine

- Model Polina Anisenko on the cover of Style:, March 2014, in Chanel
- Editor: Giselle Go
- Categories: Fashion
- Frequency: Monthly
- First issue: 2002
- Final issue: 2017
- Company: Mediacorp
- Country: Singapore
- Language: English
- Website: Style

Style: was a Singaporean fashion and lifestyle magazine published in Singapore by MediaCorp. Each month, Style: published a magazine addressing topics of fashion, beauty and lifestyle magazine which was in circulation between 2002 and 2017.

== History and profile ==
Style: was started in 2002. The magazine began publishing Malaysia in March 2007 and the magazine was sold for RM8.00 per copy. Pansing Marketing Sdn Bhd is Malaysia's distributor of the magazine and was published through Astro. The Malaysian edition of Style: was the only international edition of the magazine in 2014. In March 2017, MediaCorp announced that Style: would cease to publish its monthly print edition in favour of an expanded online presence. The magazine would continue to publish seasonal supplements.
