= BBRC (investment company) =

Australian investment company

BB Retail Capital Pty Ltd
- Formerly: Brazin Limited
- Type: Private
- Industry: Private equity
- Founded: 1980; 46 years ago
- Founder: Brett Blundy
- Headquarters: Sydney, Australia
- AUM: US$1.2 billion
- Website: https://bbrcworld.com/

BBRC is a private investment company founded by Australian businessman Brett Blundy.

== History ==
=== 1980s ===
In 1980, 20-year-old Brett Blundy and a business partner he met from school bought two rundown record stores called Disco Stick. They immediately closed one, combined the stock into the Pakenham store (situated in a small shopping arcade) and reopened as Jetts, selling vinyl records and cassettes. The lease for this store was for a three-year period, but it was losing money from day one. Blundy and his partner found another unloved record store a year later, this time within a bigger shopping district at Parkmore Shopping Centre, Keysborough, supported by a larger surrounding population. Before they purchased it, the Parkmore store was turning over $2,000 a week, but six months later as a Jetts outlet, it had increased to $15,000, and was subsidising the failing Pakenham store which was closed once the lease had expired. The Parkmore outlet lasted until 2010 under the Jetts, Delta, and Sanity branding.

In 1986, Blundy and his business partner went their separate ways with Blundy selling his 60% stake in the eight-store Jetts chain to his former partner for $600,000.

Brazin Limited officially commenced operation after Blundy expanded Bras 'N' Things into South Australia and then Queensland.

=== 1990s ===
In 1990, Brazin Limited bought back the failed Jetts chain from the liquidators at a discount and began to progressively rebrand them as Delta music stores.

The Sanity concept and brand was established and introduced by Brazin in 1992 with its first store at Doncaster Shoppingtown. This occurred by chance thanks to Blundy's working knowledge of Doncaster Shoppingtown, as – while running his five-store company in the late 1980s – he worked as a casual shop assistant in its Just Jeans store to learn more about its culture and internal processes. When he found out the centre's only record shop closed without notice he brazenly talked his way into that lease with the centre manager, even though it was earmarked for another music retailer (that store ceased trading in 2010). Also in that year, Blundy's company started the designer, marketer and distributor (no shopfronts) of women's surfwear brand, Aztec Rose.

In 1997, the company acquired 14 CC Records outlets in Victoria, folding them into the Sanity/Delta network. Brazin Limited also listed publicly with the Australian Securities Exchange in December of that year with an initial public offering at $1.50 a share. Blundy retained a 62% stake in the company.

In June 1998, it acquired 27 outlets from the Brashs music chain on its demise via its administrators, KPMG, and the two remaining stores from Blockbuster Music in Pitt Street, Sydney, and Chapel Street, Melbourne – relaunching all of them as Sanity music stores on an ongoing basis (with staff, leases, etc. continuing at each store). After these acquisitions, Sanity and Delta had 148 outlets combined with Brazin publicly stating their aim was for 250 nationwide. The share price was now up to $2.29.

In September 1998, Brazin introduced IN2 Music stores by converting three Delta outlets in North Queensland and outer Melbourne. Like Delta, IN2 Music targeted a wider demographic than Sanity's focus on the youth 16-26 age group, giving Brazin more scope after the collapse of adult-orientated chain, Brashs. IN2 Music expanded the next year after the company purchased a further 23 CC Records stores in South Australia and Queensland, and re-branded more Delta outlets.

In May 1999, the company created Viva Lingerie, targeting a different demographic to Bras 'N' Things – the former, focused on young, price-conscious women. Also in that year, Brazin acquired another nine lingerie retail stores from Triumph International.

=== 2000s ===
In March 2000, Sanity's first foray into a digital music download service caused consternation within the industry when they signed a five-year deal with Festival Mushroom Records for a three-year online exclusivity window on all tracks downloaded from the label at Sanity's website. Rival retailers or other online services were meant to be blocked from Festival Mushroom's catalogue for that period unless Sanity chose to strike separate deals with their rivals to let them in. Chaos.com and Leading Edge Music both made public threats to boycott Festival Mushroom's content, but HMV Australia (whose website did not offer downloading) followed through, removing all their CDs from their domestic stores, adding they were would do the same overseas. But the next week, Festival Mushroom backed down, stating Sanity would simply be the wholesaler of their digital downloads for the next three years, requiring them to make all products available to other retailers at the time of release. In June of that year, Brazin opened the Gosh Coffee chain with an aim of 50 outlets within the year and ultimately reaching 200 to 300 nationwide. The store count at the end of June 2000 saw Sanity contain 233 outlets.

In January 2001, Ian Duffell was appointed CEO with Brett Blundy moving down to run Brazin's strategic development, however eight months later he relinquished the position swapping roles with Blundy again. Duffell remained a director until April 2003.

In October 2001, Sanity expanded into the United Kingdom via two related transactions with Richard Branson's Virgin Group, acquiring 77 troubled Our Price music stores for a symbolic £2, and in turn gaining exclusive license rights in Australia for Virgin Entertainment (which last traded in Australia nine years before under the co-ownership of the Virgin Group and Blockbuster Inc.). Brazin paid £7.7 million (A$21.8 million) to the Virgin Group while getting that exact amount back from Virgin for tax reasons. Brazin's managing director, Ian Duffel said that the UK music market was one of the strongest in the world that year and he expected a, "50 per cent increase in music revenues from day one." Further to the deal, Virgin would get 1 per cent of all turnover in the stores in conjunction to offering Brazin a £2 million loan facility. Brazin also made a commitment to restrict the size and proximity of its Sanity UK stores in order to ensure they do not pose a large competitive threat to Virgin's other music shops. In Australia, Brazin re-established the first Virgin Megastore, in Chapel Street's The Jam Factory shopping centre, in April 2002. Brazin also intended to use the Virgin brand to open 45 new stores in addition to converting 55 of its existing IN2 Music stores that had not already been rebranded as Sanity. However, the program stalled as Brazin battled internal disruptions and struggled to separate the target markets for Virgin and its chain of more than 200 Sanity stores (at the time). As a result, the company's entertainment division posted a $27 million loss in financial year, 2002–03, and by mid-2004, Brazin had only managed to open 12 Virgin Megastores. By the end of this year, Brazin sold out of its loss-making Gosh Coffee 16-store chain (of which, six were sold to Freshfood Hospitality Pty Ltd with three still in operation today), and City Live nightclub at Fox Studios in Sydney.

In November 2002, an additional 41 British VShop music and mobile phone stores were acquired from the Virgin Group for £2 million. Earlier that year, Brazin experienced many delays in rebranding the Our Price stores due to landlords, heritage listings, and negotiations with Railtrack. The company also shifted Sanity UK's headquarters from Our Price's central London offices to Alperton. The new British outlets were already starting to return on investments and overall company operating profit rose to 32 per cent in the year to 30 June 2002 to $22.1 million with Sanity-branded outlets then numbering 291 in Australia.

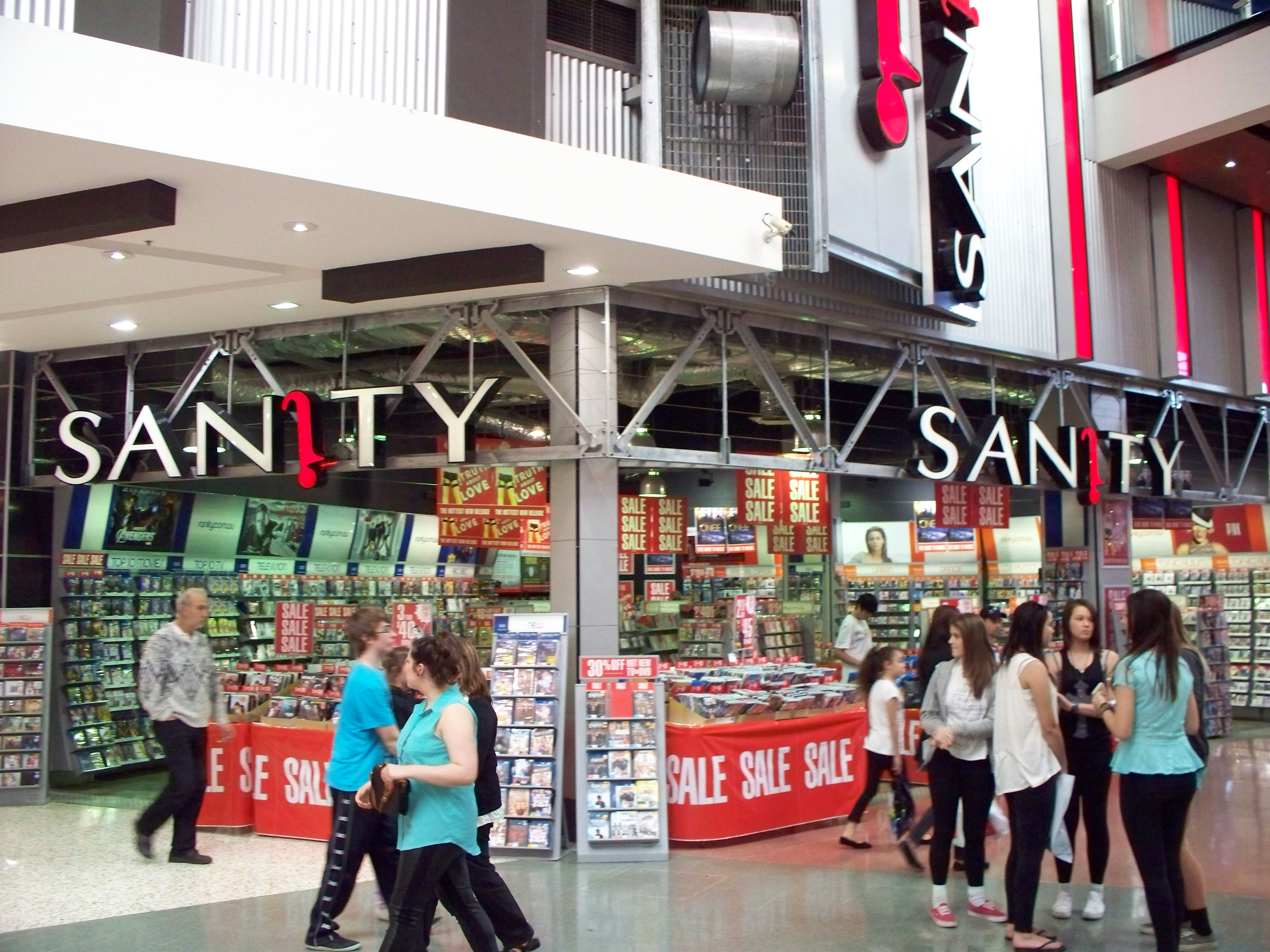
A Sanity outlet within Westfield Fountain Gate

In June 2003, with Brazin's shareprice languishing at $0.55, some business analysts criticised the company's strategy of aggressive expansion in the Sanity brand – which they said may be cannibalising sales from sister stores – instead of concentrating on lifting the performance of existing outlets. Under this cloud, Blundy's retail investment company, Yoda Holdings, made a bid to take full control and privatise the company at $0.78. But after this announcement, shares rallied over Blundy's offer and the Australian Shareholders Association attacked the move, saying it was an abuse of the Corporations Act to use recycled money from Brazin to buy out their own minority shareholders. A month later, Blundy withdrew the bid, offering little explanation, to the public bemusement of some Brazin executives.

In August 2003, Brazin acquired a 50 per cent shareholding in EzyDVD which had 15 stores at the time, while the company also bought the 19-store footwear company, Ghetto, from Blundy's Yoda Holdings. During this period of expansion, CEO Brett Blundy admitted that the Sanity chain needed to be restructured. He blamed heavy discounting in the DVD market, where large chains such as Kmart, Target and Big W accounted for more than one-third of the industry's sales. (Within Sanity itself, DVD sales accounted for 30% in 2003, compared to just 6% in 2001.) More short-term, its six Sanity and Virgin music stores at Sydney Airport, Melbourne Airport, and London Heathrow Airport, were hit hard by fewer passengers, spooked by the Iraq War and SARS, cancelling many flights. Yet, Brazin continued with their strategy of not discounting its regular line of CDs and DVDs to meet heavy discounters and rapidly expanding rivals, such as JB Hi-Fi which was (and still is) eating away at Sanity's market share. Blundy cited the very thin profit margins gained from such discounts as the main reason for keeping prices near the recommended retail price. (In August 1996, Sanity's general manager, Daniel Agostinelli, told Billboard that each CD sold in the 60-store chain then made 27.5% gross profit before subtracting 24% in costs.) Also in this month, Greg Milne was appointed CEO, leaving Blundy to again move down to head strategic development.

In September 2003, even after increasing profitability across their store network, Brazin Limited sold all 118 Sanity UK stores (those, being the rebranded Our Price and VShop stores) to an investment firm called Primemist Limited, for an estimated £5 million (A$16.67 million), citing higher expectations not met. The Sanity name lived on in the UK for a very short while as rebranding was yet to occur, until Primemist immediately struggled to operate the chain due to difficulties with credit and stock purchasing, thus, entered administration in December 2003, progressively shutting 99 outlets as buyers for the entire business or individual parts of it could not be found. By April 2004, administrators BDO Stoy Hayward then closed the last 19 Sanity/Our Price stores.

In July 2004, Brazin entered into an agreement with Coles Myer to open 62 Virgin concept stores within the Myer department store chain. Brazin agreed to buy all of Myer's remaining CD and DVD stock, recruit, train and pay their own staff, and work within Myer's systems and promotions. These concept stores were marketed separately to stand-alone Virgin Megastores (due to their more limited stock availability) and were branded Virgin at Myer. This solved Brazin's problem since 2002 by separating the Virgin and Sanity target markets by making Virgin more "family orientated" while leaving Sanity's "street edge" to continue. Exactly a year later, Brazin stated that after a rocky start (with staff recruitment issues and aligning products with the typical Myer customer), Virgin at Myer was up 45 per cent on comparative sales and was performing well.

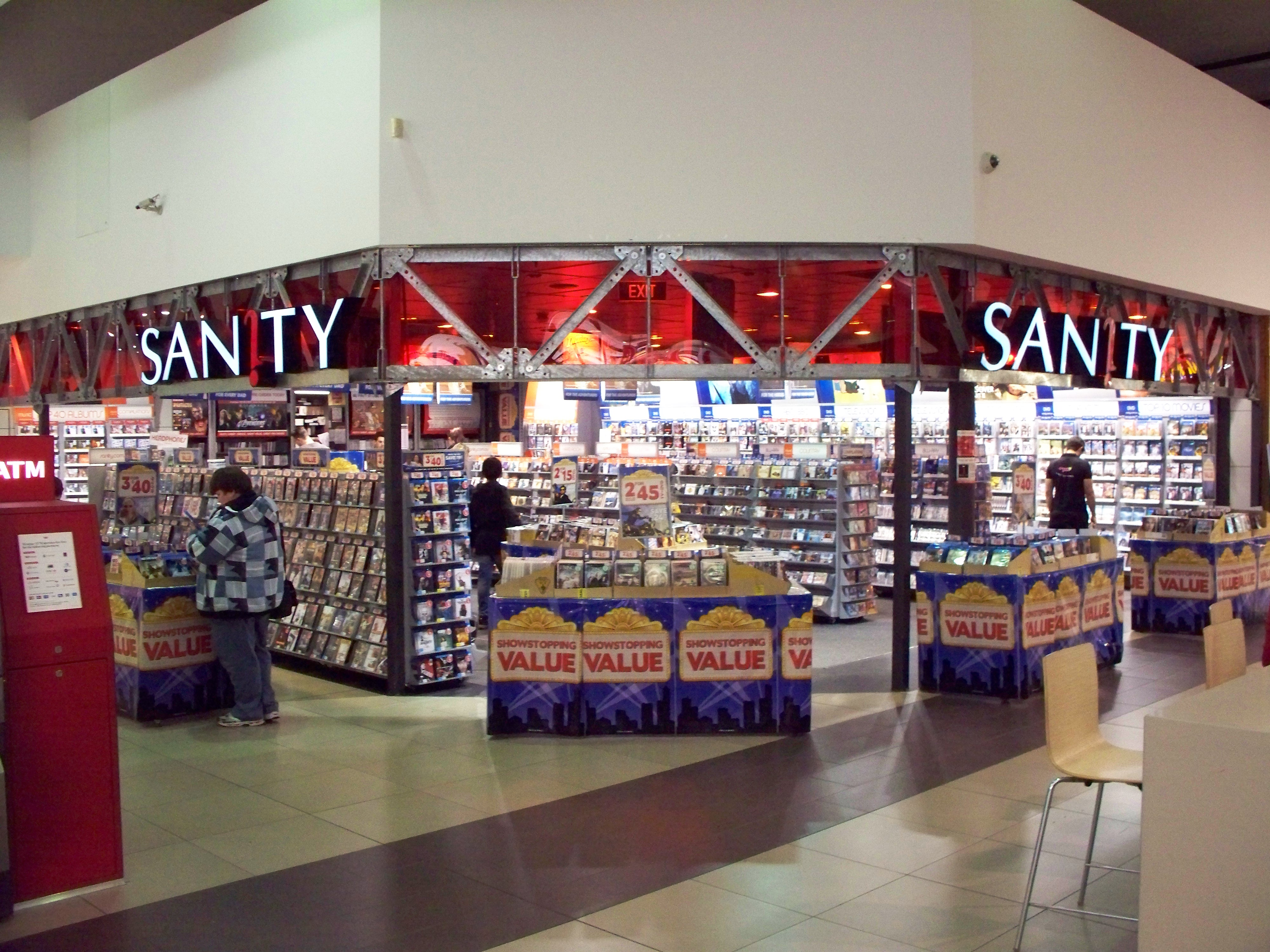
A Sanity outlet within the Northgate Shopping Centre

In October 2005, Brazin acquired the Australian operations of HMV. The HMV Group's agreement with Brazin was to phase out the HMV brand in Australia by 2010. Immediately after this acquisition of HMV's 32 outlets, this put Brazin at its peak with its 74 Virgin stores in addition to Sanity's 215 and EzyDVD's 63 outlets around the country (not counting non-entertainment retail chains within Brazin such as, Bras 'N' Things) and was by far Australia's largest entertainment retailer with close to 43% of the music retail market. However, most HMV stores in Australia had very high overhead costs due to their large footprints and expensive locations, thus most were gradually closed upon the end of rental leases. The remaining stores were re-branded to Sanity over the next five years. The one notable exception to closing HMV stores in 2005 saw Brazin instead close its large Sanity store 60 meters away on the corner of Bourke Street Mall and Causeway Lane which had operated since 1996 (that space is now occupied by a Forever New clothing store). Also in that month, Brazin officially launched its Pulse loyalty card after a year of testing in the market. It worked by giving the customer one point for every dollar spent across the Sanity/Virgin/HMV/IN2 Music/EzyDVD/Bras 'N' Things/Dusk/Diva/Ghetto/Insane store network, receiving a $5 discount voucher or other offers once 100 points were reached. Earlier in 2005, Brazin dropped the underperforming Ghetto and Insane chains while picking up women's fashion accessories retailer, Diva – the former raising questions about Blundy's role at Brazin.

In February 2006, Brazin rolled out in-store kiosks where customers could select their own songs to either burn on a CD or download directly into an MP3 player. Fast Tracks Kiosks were initially installed in Sydney's Sanity/Virgin/HMV stores, with plans to go country-wide if successful. Yet, Brazin chose not to proceed.

In May 2006, the company's entire 344-store Sanity/Virgin/HMV network withdrew sales data from the ARIA Charts, with Brazin CEO, Greg Milne citing the need for more updated day-to-day charts over ARIA's reliance on weekly information. However, it was reported that allegedly Brazin attempted to make ARIA pay an annual fee between $200,000 and $300,000 for their data through Sydney-based research firm, GFK. This was denied by Brazin, but six months later the company resumed data collection for ARIA. At that stage, Brazin's Entertainment Division included 254 Sanity, 22 HMV, 6 Virgin Megastores, and 62 Virgin at Myer stores. Some record label executives estimated their combined music retail market share at between 28% and 35%.

In November 2006, after more than a year of a falling share price while average S&P/ASX 200 prices had gone up 21 per cent in the same period, Brazin's founder and majority shareholder, Brett Blundy, used his fully owned private retail investment company, BB Retail Capital, to buy the remaining 37.6 per cent of the company he did not already own and make it private. He said that with "stagnant profits, market uncertainty around Brazin's entertainment business and challenging retail market conditions", the company would be better off in private hands without the pressures of the share market. Brazin's board and remaining shareholders agreed to Blundy's offer, leaving Brazin to be folded into BB Retail Capital and ceasing to exist in its own right.

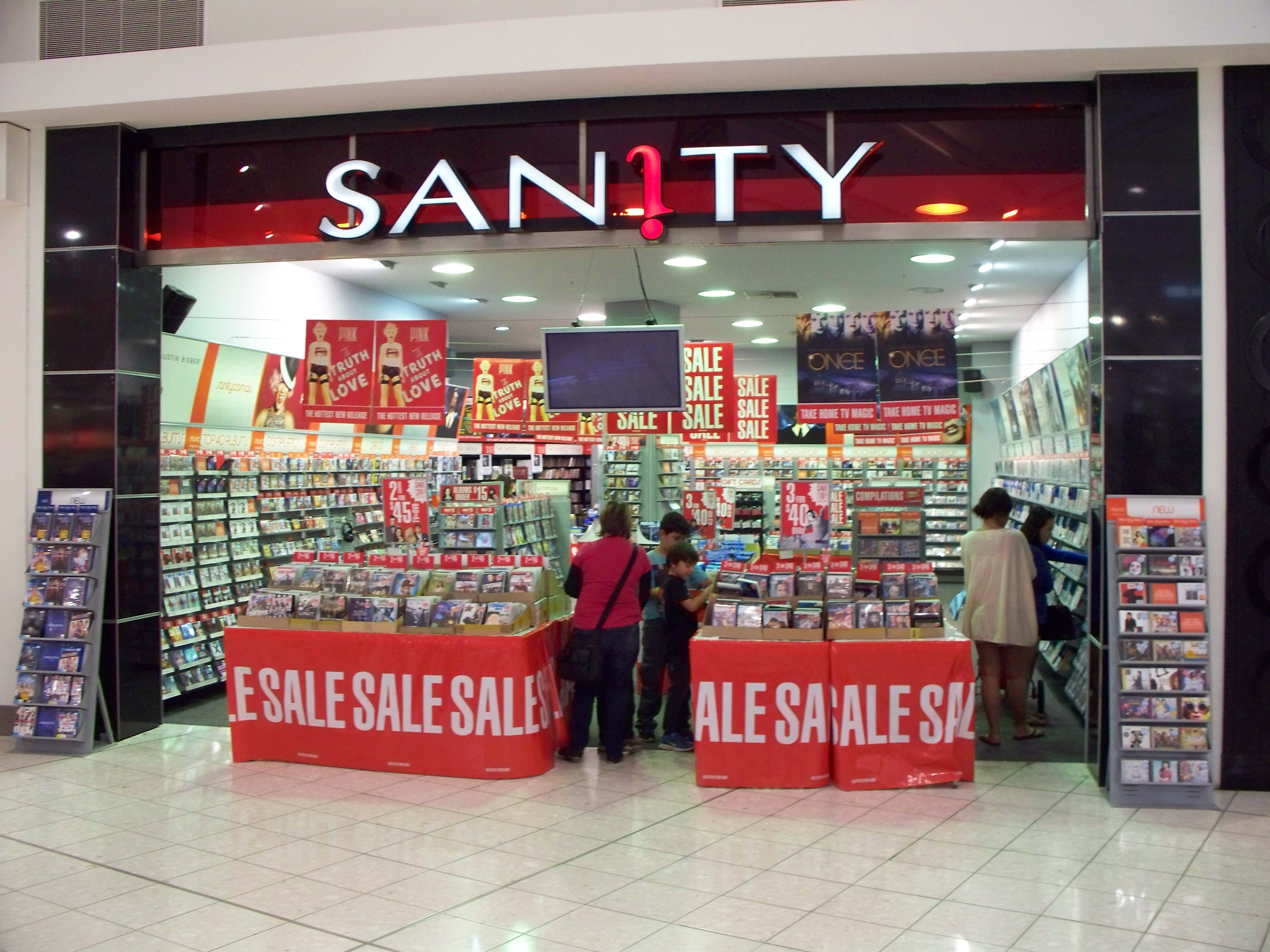
A Sanity outlet within the Watergardens Town Centre, this store closed in July 2013

In March 2008, after months of delay and development, Sanity responded to the expanding Internet media environment by launching an online music subscription service in partnership with Microsoft called, LoadIt. However the service was scrapped only four months after its launch as its popularity was hindered by uncompetitive pricing, restricted usability and heavy competition from BigPond and iTunes services. According to IBISWorld, the tough times experienced by Sanity after being folded into BBRC resulted in its revenue declining 16 per cent in financial year 2008-09 and a further 21 per cent in 2009–10.

In September 2009, CEO Brett Blundy sold the Entertainment Division of BB Retail Capital – which included the remaining 238 Sanity/Virgin/HMV store network – to BBRC's Head of Entertainment, Ray Itaoui, in a management buy-out. Still retaining its Milperra headquarters (which Brazin used to operate in), Sanity Entertainment became a private company in its own right. As a result of the split, Pulse cards could only be used in BBRC's remaining store portfolio of Dusk, Diva, and Adairs.

== Operations ==
=== Current operations ===
==== Bared Footwear ====
In 2020, BBRC acquired a 35 per cent stake in footwear company Bared Footwear.

==== BBRC Beef ====
BBRC diversified into beef in 2010 by acquiring a stake in Barkly Pastoral Company. BBRC focuses on beef exports into Asia. It owns the Beetaloo, Mungabroom, and OT Downs stations. It previously owned the Amungee Mungee and Walhallow stations.

==== Best & Less Group ====
BBRC acquired the Best & Less Group in 2023. The group comprises Best & Less, an Australian retailer of clothing and household goods, and Postie, a New Zealand clothing chain.

==== City Chic Collective ====
BBRC owns a stake in Australian fashion company City Chic Collective.

==== Dissh ====
In March 2024, BBRC acquired a 40 per cent stake in fashion label Dissh.

==== Dusk ====
In December 2004, Brazin acquired Perth-based candle and gift-ware retailer Dusk, which operated 41 outlets at the time.

==== Hot 8 Yoga ====
BBRC is an investor in California-based yoga studio chain, Hot 8 Yoga.

==== Léays ====
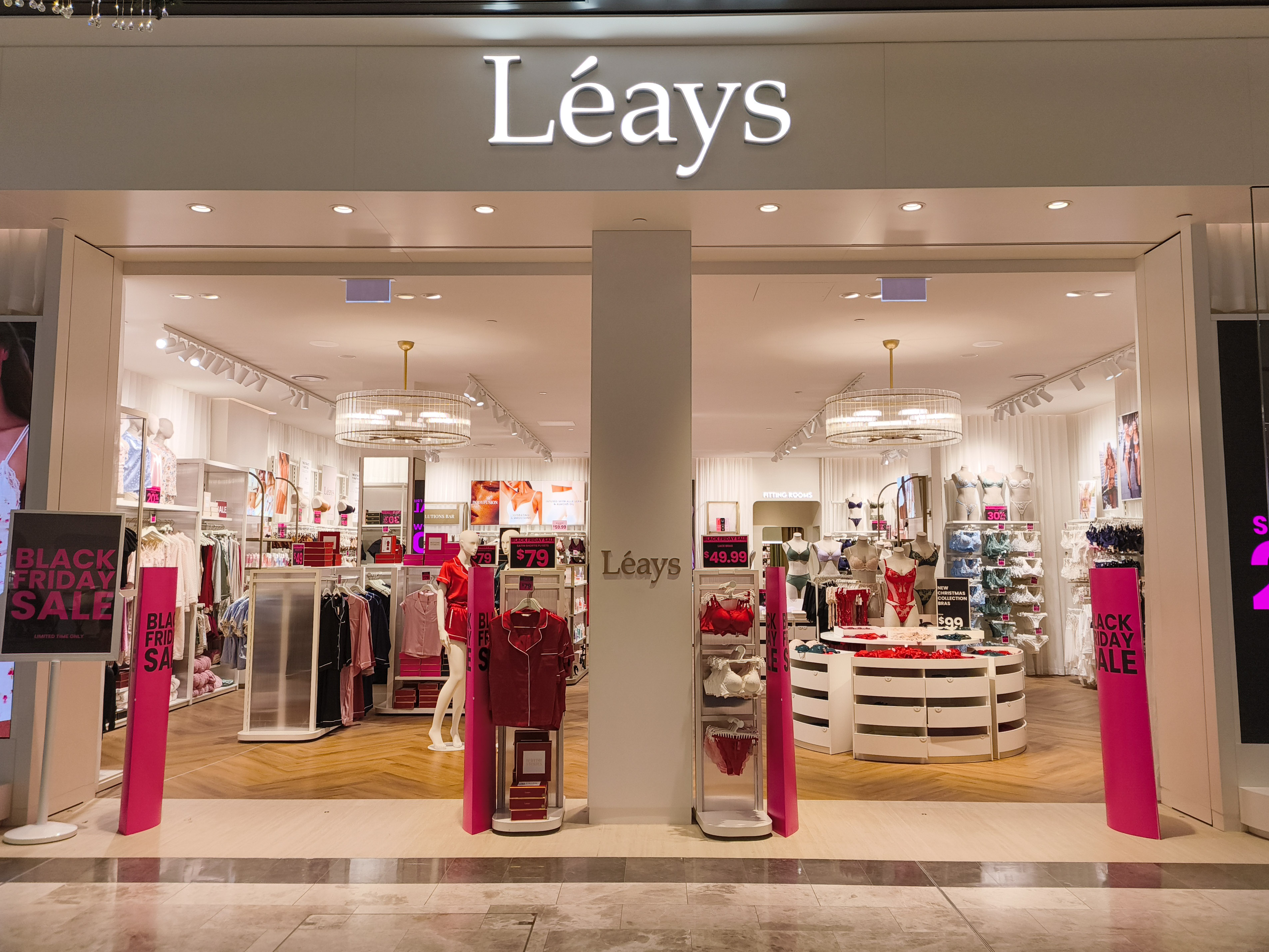
Léays store in Westfield Carousel

In May 2025, BBRC launched Léays, a lingerie, apparel and beauty retailer.

==== Plant Therapy ====
BBRC has been an investor of Plant Therapy, a US-based supplier of essential oils and accessories, since 2019.

==== Victoria's Secret ====
BBRC began acquiring shares in the American lingerie brand Victoria's Secret in 2022. As of May 2025, BBRC had a 12.9 per cent stake in Victoria's Secret. In 2025, BBRC launched an activist campaign seeking board changes, including the removal of chair Donna James and the appointment of Blundy as a director. At the company's 2026 annual meeting, Victoria's Secret shareholders reelected all board nominees, including James, despite BBRC's proxy challenge.

=== Former operations ===
==== Accent Group ====
In December 2017, BBRC acquired a 17.99 per cent stake in footwear retailer and distributor Accent Group. BBRC sold off its stake in August 2024.

==== Adairs ====
In November 2007, BB Retail Capital bought an 80 per cent stake in specialty manchester and soft furnishing retailer, Adairs, from its long-term owners, the MacLean family. Adairs operated 90 stores at that stage.

==== Bras N Things ====
Bretty Blundy took out his first franchise in The Bra Shop chain at Chirnside Park Shopping Centre, mainly selling brand name product, but gradually sourcing different lines independently of the franchise. Bryan Luca, the franchisor of The Bra Shop, entered into an agreement with Blundy to buy his three Victorian stores in exchange for Luca's four underperforming Bras N Things outlets in New South Wales.

By the end of 2008, BBRC sold its controlling interest in Bras 'N' Things to ANZ and IMF Investors.

In November 2013, Sanity owner, Ray Itaoui, together with Blundy, each bought 50 per cent stakes in Bras 'N' Things, from private equity consortiums, ANZ and IMF Investors.

In February 2018, Bras 'N' Things was sold to Hanes Australasia for an estimated AU$500 million.

==== Honey Birdette ====
BBRC previously owned a 62 per cent stake in Australian-based lingerie chain Honey Birdette. In June 2021, PLBY Group acquired Honey Birdette for A$443 million in cash and stock.

==== Universal Store ====
BBRC was part of a consortium of three investors which acquired the fashion retail chain Universal Store for $110 million in June 2018. The company went public on the Australian Securities Exchange on 17 November 2020.
