= Duffell =

Duffell is a surname. Notable people with this surname include:

- Charlie Duffell (born 1986), English cricketer
- Ian Duffell (born 20th century), English businessman
- Joseph Duffell (c.1862–1936), English-born Australian politician
- Peter Duffell (1922–2017), British film and TV director and screenwriter
- Peter Duffell (British Army officer), (born 1939), Commander of British forces in Hong Kong

== See also ==
- Albert Duffel (1813–1862), American justice
