= Greenlit Brands =

Australian retail company

- Formerly: Steinhoff Asia Pacific Group
- Type: Subsidiary
- Industry: Retail
- Parent: Ibex Topco B.V.
- Website: greenlitbrands.com.au

Greenlit Brands, formerly Steinhoff Asia Pacific Group, was the Australian subsidiary of Ibex Topco B.V.

== History ==
Steinhoff International acquired South African company Pepkor in November 2014.

In October 2016, Steinhoff Asia Pacific announced it would acquire Fantastic Holdings for A$361 million. Fantastic Holdings included the chains Fantastic Furniture, Plush, Le Cornu and Original Mattress Factory.

In September 2018, Steinhoff Asia Pacific rebranded as Greenlit Brands to distance itself from the controversy surrounding its parent company.

In November 2019, Greenlit announced it would sell its entire general merchandising division to private equity firm Allegro Funds. The deal included Best & Less, Harris Scarfe and Postie. Harris Scarfe immediately collapsed into receivership and was sold to Spotlight Group.

In 2003, Freedom Furniture was bought out by management and taken private in a deal backed by Steinhoff International, the company's supplier and largest shareholder.

In October 2021, Greenlit sold its Plush sofa business to Nick Scali Furniture for $110 million. In June 2022, Greenlit sold its Original Mattress Factory retail business.

In April 2023, LK Group's Queens Lane Capital investment arm purchased Snooze from Greenlit Brands, along with its FutureSleep bedding manufacture and G&G furniture import and wholesale subsidiaries.

In June 2025, Amart Furniture announced it would acquire the Freedom business from Greenlit Brands. The deal closed in August 2025.

In May 2026, Fantastic Furniture was sold to Allegro Funds.

== Former brands ==
- Best & Less – Discount retailer. Sold in November 2019 to Allegro Funds.
- Postie – New Zealand clothing chain. Sold in November 2019 to Allegro Funds.
- Harris Scarfe – Homewares and manchester chain. Sold in November 2019 to Allegro Funds.
- Plush – Think Sofas – Acquired in October 2016 and sold in October 2021 to Nick Scali Furniture.
- Original Mattress Factory – Acquired in October 2016 and sold in June 2022.
- Snooze – Founded in 1974 as Capt'n Snooze. Sold to Queens Lane Capital in April 2023.
- Freedom Furniture – Furniture retailer sold to Amart in June 2025.
- Fantastic Furniture – Furniture retailer acquired in 2016 and sold to Allegro Funds in May 2026.
