= Honey Birdette =

Lingerie retail chain

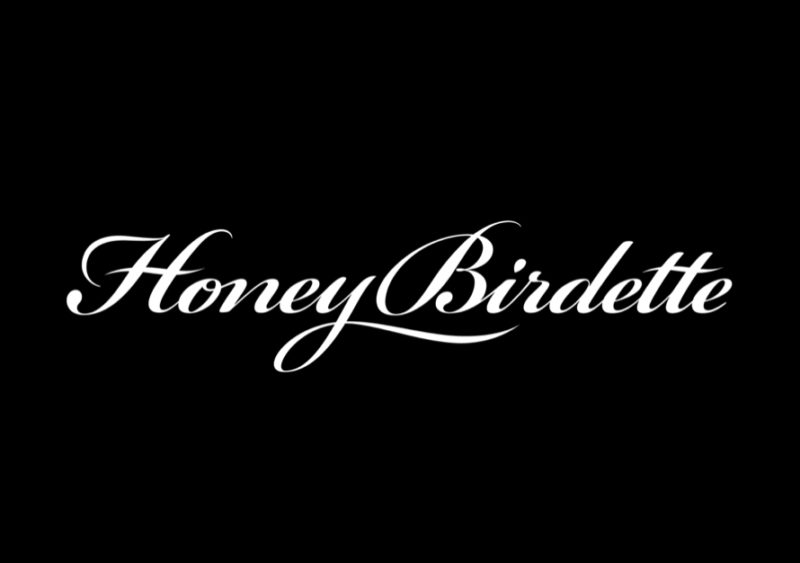

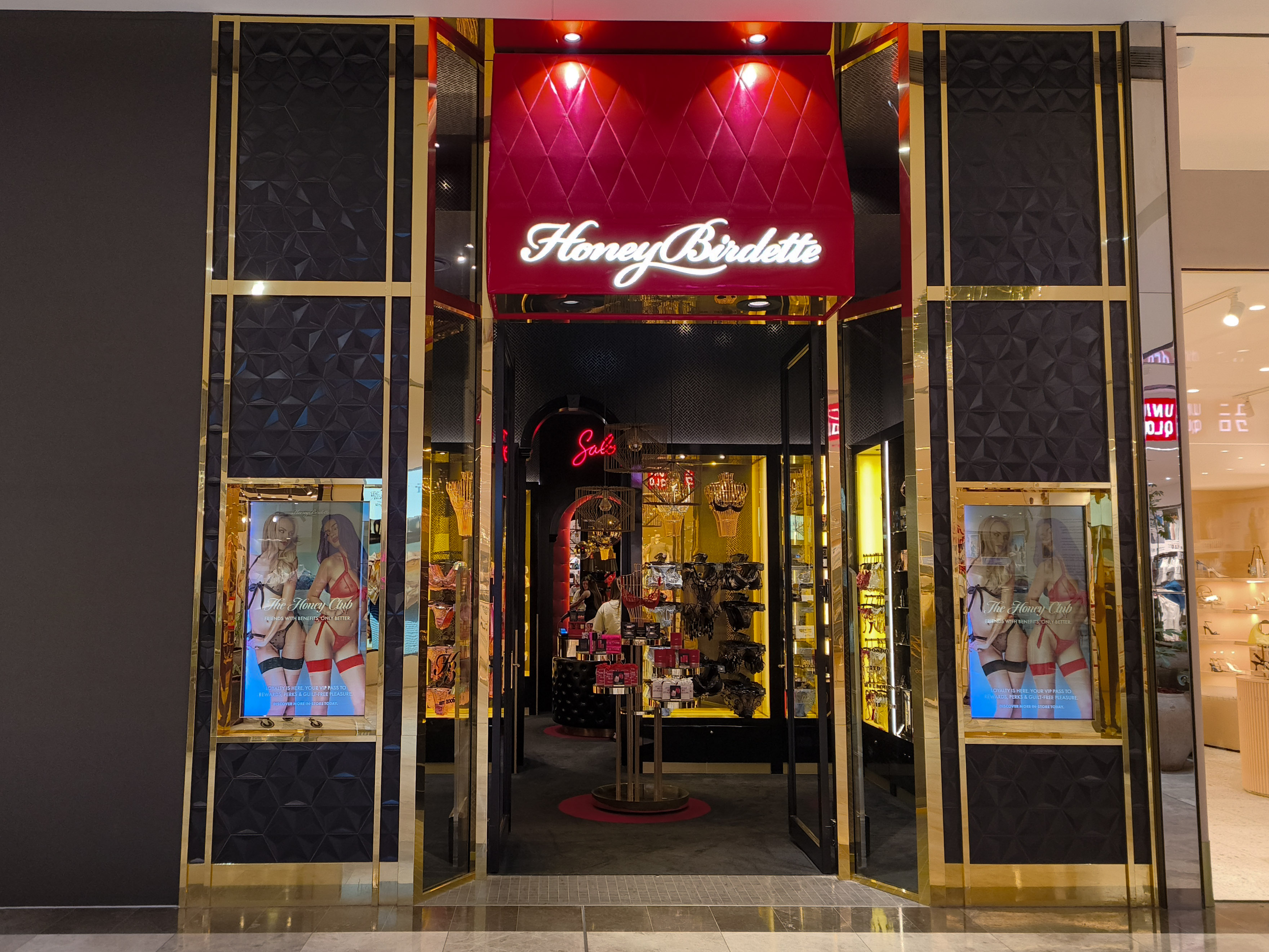
- Honey Birdette store in Westfield Carousel
- Type: Subsidiary
- Industry: Retail
- Founded: 2006
- Founders: Eloise Monaghan; Janelle Barboza
- Headquarters: Sydney, New South Wales, Australia
- Number of locations: 54 (as of 2024)
- Area served: Australia; United States; Europe; United Kingdom
- Key people: Eloise Monaghan (Managing Director); Kim Kidd (CEO)
- Parent: PLBY Group (2021–present)
- Website: https://www.honeybirdette.com

Honey Birdette is an Australian lingerie and intimate apparel retailer that operates boutiques and an e-commerce business in Australia, the United States, Europe and the United Kingdom.

The company is a wholly owned subsidiary of PLBY Group, a publicly traded consumer lifestyle company. Honey Birdette has been covered in Australian and international business and fashion media in connection with its retail expansion, product category development, and its marketing practices.

== History ==
Honey Birdette was founded in 2006 in Brisbane, Australia, by Eloise Monaghan and Janelle Barboza. The company operated a boutique retail format before expanding into major shopping centres across Australia.

In October 2011, BB Retail Capital (BBRC), a private investment company chaired by Brett Blundy, acquired a majority stake in Honey Birdette, supporting further expansion of its retail network.

Honey Birdette began international expansion in the mid-2010s, opening its first UK boutique in London in 2017. It later expanded into the United States, including stores in cities such as Las Vegas and New York.

In 2021, Honey Birdette was acquired by PLBY Group, the parent company of Playboy Enterprises, in a transaction disclosed in filings with the U.S. Securities and Exchange Commission. Following the acquisition, Honey Birdette became part of PLBY Group’s direct-to-consumer retail segment.

== Products ==
Honey Birdette’s product range includes lingerie and intimate apparel, including bras, briefs, bodysuits, corsetry, and hosiery. The brand also offers accessories and lifestyle products associated with its core apparel ranges. These products are sold through company-operated boutiques and online platforms in Australia, the United States, Europe and the United Kingdom.

== Geographic presence ==
Honey Birdette operates company-owned boutiques and e-commerce platforms in Australia, the United States, Europe and the United Kingdom. Its international operations form part of the global retail portfolio of its parent company, PLBY Group.

== Controversies ==
Honey Birdette has faced regulatory and public scrutiny in relation to aspects of its advertising and marketing campaigns. Media coverage has documented complaints submitted to Ad Standards concerning window displays and advertising materials. The company has publicly responded to such complaints, disputing that its campaigns breached applicable standards.

The brand also attracted criticism in connection with a Breast Cancer Awareness Month campaign linked to charitable donations. Reporting noted debate regarding the tone and presentation of the campaign, while confirming that funds were raised for the McGrath Foundation.
