= BBRC =

BBRC could refer to:

- BBRC (investment company), an Australian private investment company
- Biochemical and Biophysical Research Communications, a biological journal
- British Birds Rarities Committee
