= Lovisa (company) =

Australian jewellery chain

Lovisa Holdings Limited

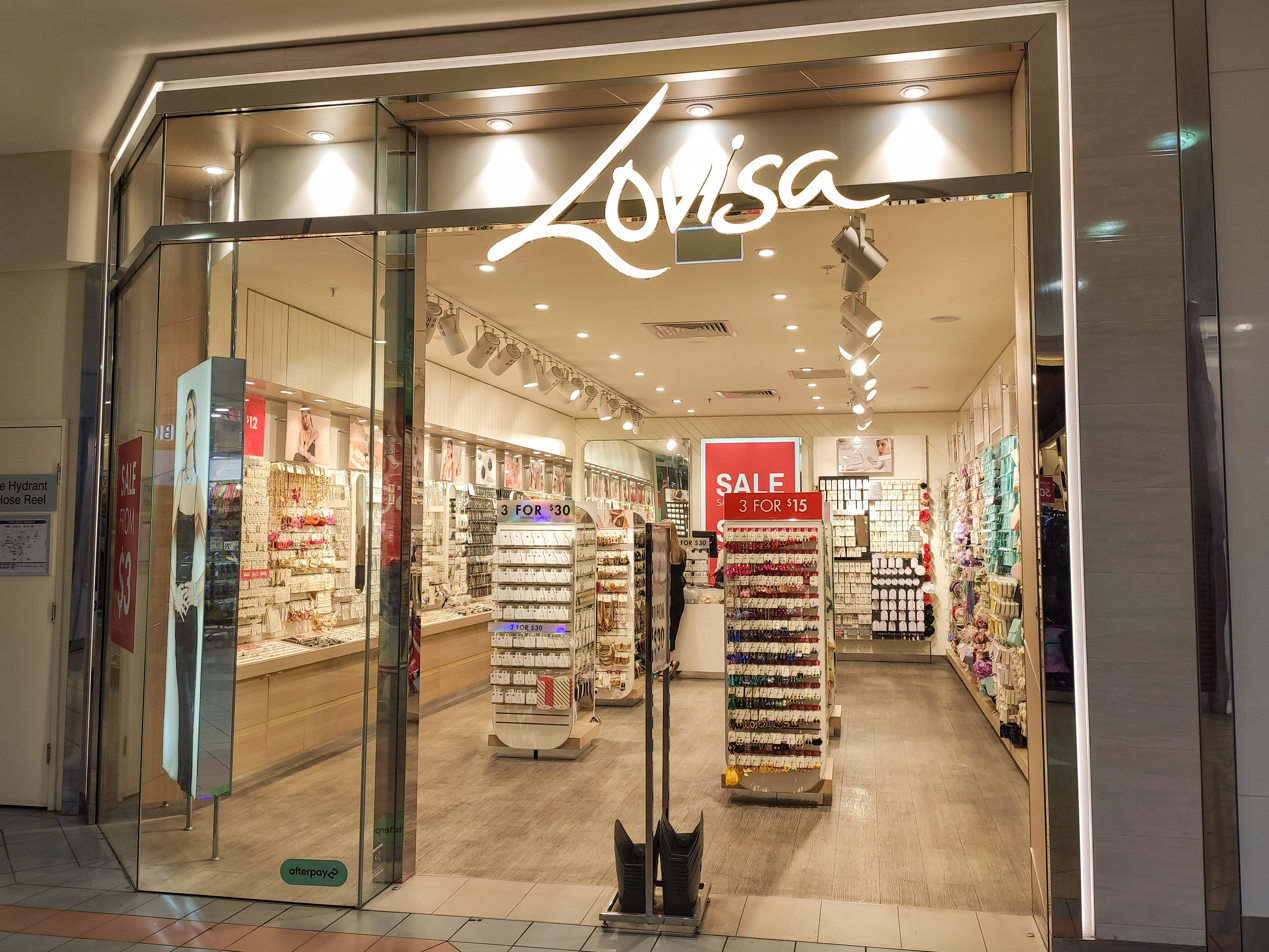
- Lovisa store in Armadale Shopping City, Western Australia
- Type: Public
- Traded as: ASX: LOV
- Industry: Retail
- Founded: 2010; 16 years ago
- Headquarters: Sydney, New South Wales, Australia
- Number of locations: 1024 Lovisa stores and 7 Jewells stores (July 2025)
- Key people: Brett Blundy (Chairman); John Cheston (CEO)
- Products: Jewellery
- Website: lovisa.com.au

Lovisa Holdings Limited is an Australian jewellery chain founded in Sydney in April 2010. This fast fashion jewellery brand was launched by Australian billionaire Brett Blundy, the former chairman of BB Retail Capital (BBRC). As of July 2025, Lovisa has 1024 stores across more than 50 countries including Australia, New Zealand, Malaysia, Singapore, South Africa, Spain, France, Canada, Peru and the United States. Lovisa also has franchised stores in the Middle East and Vietnam. The company also operates Jewells, an upmarket jewellery chain with 7 stores in the UK.

== History ==
Shane Fallscheer, the managing director and executive director of Lovisa partnered with Brett Blundy's private investment company BBRC in 2010 to establish this fast-fashion specialty jewellery chain. The brand concept for Lovisa was envisioned to be an extension of BBRC's existing jewellery brand, Diva.

In December 2014, Lovisa had its initial public offering on the Australian Securities Exchange. That same year, all remaining Diva locations had been closed or converted into Lovisa stores.

Due to "poor support from landlords" during the COVID-19 pandemic in Spain, Lovisa exited the country in the 2020 fiscal year.

=== Expansion ===
In November 2020, Lovisa announced its acquisition of part of the European retail store network of German jewellery wholesaler Beeline GmbH. The deal concerns 74 stores operating under the Six and I Am names in Germany, Switzerland, the Netherlands, Belgium, Austria and Luxembourg. The stores were rebranded as Lovisa. In December 2020, Lovisa acquired Beeline's 30 stores in France.

In 2023, Lovisa opened a 5,000 m^{2} (54,000 sq ft) warehouse in Poland to replace its third-party logistics service providers in the European region.

In 2025, Lovisa launched a new upmarket brand in the UK called Jewells. As of July 2025, there were 7 Jewells stores in the UK.

== Controversies ==
Following an investigation by the Labour Inspectorate in New Zealand in 2021, Lovisa had to pay NZ$153,190 in wage arrears to employees.

In January and July 2022, Lovisa employees in Belgium went on strike due to poor working conditions and pay. Employees in the Netherlands also took action in July 2022, handing out leaflets and informing customers about poor pay conditions.

In January 2025, a class action lawsuit which involved more than 300 former Australian Lovisa employees was filed, accusing the company of underpayment and a hostile work environment.
