= Bras N Things =

Women's lingerie chain store

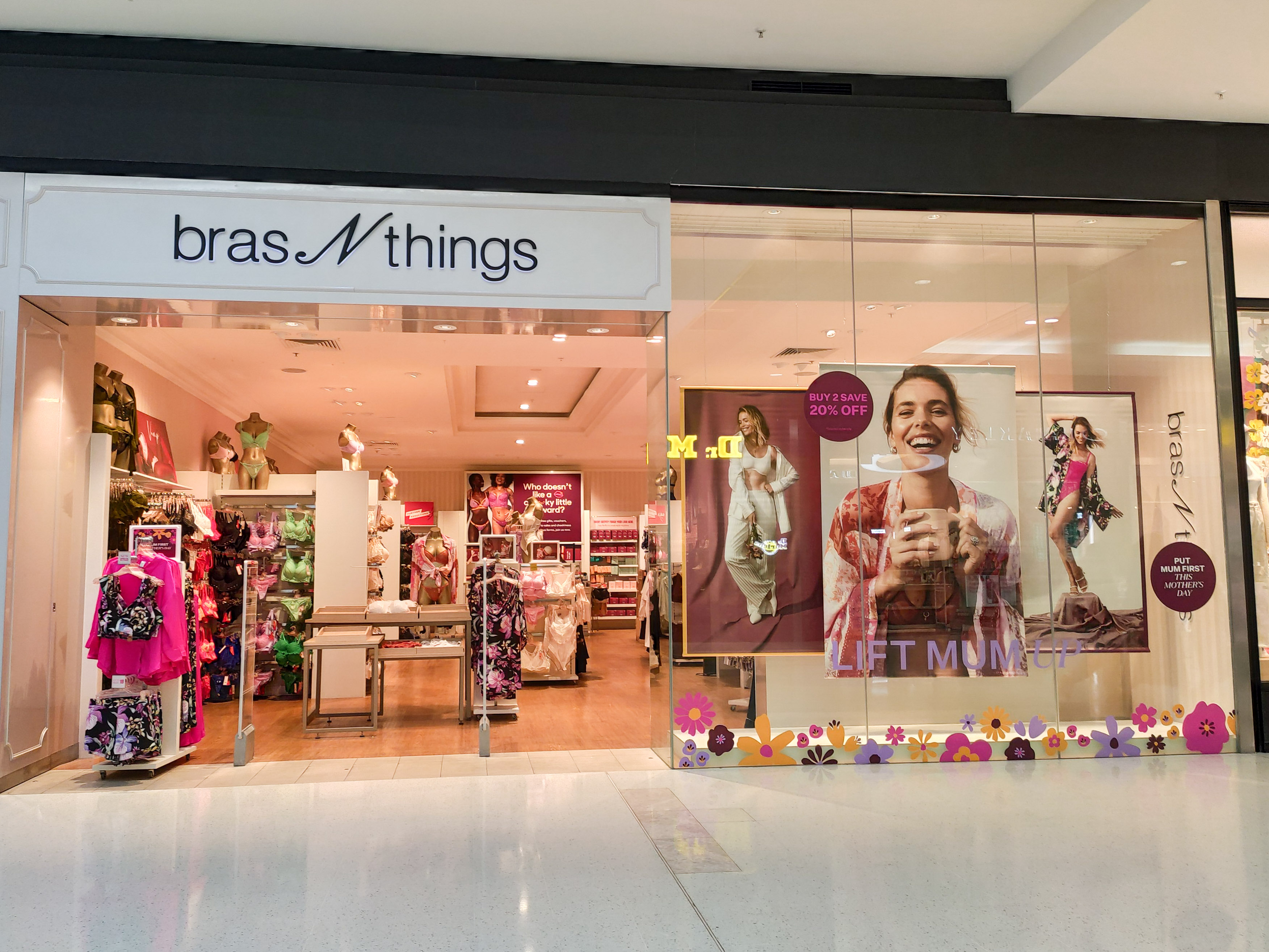
- Bras N Things store in Westfield Carousel
- Type: Subsidiary
- Industry: Retail
- Predecessor: The Bra Shop
- Headquarters: Sydney, Australia
- Parent: Hanes Australasia
- Website: brasnthings.com

Bras N Things is a lingerie retailer. It is owned by Hanes Australasia and operates in Australia, New Zealand, South Africa and the United States.

== History ==
In 1986, Brett Blundy sold his 60% stake in the Jetts music store chain to his former partner for $600,000. This left Blundy to pursue an idea he had three months before the Jetts sell-off, after he noticed one of his fashionable female store managers kept wearing a broken bra, held together with a safety pin. Knowing that most lingerie at that time were beige in colour with unflattering cuts, he wanted to sell underwear in various cuts and colours, alongside G-strings that were unheard of for casual wear. Three months later, he took out his first franchise in The Bra Shop chain at Chirnside Park Shopping Centre, mainly selling brand name product, but gradually sourcing different lines independently of the franchise (his first run of 15 G-strings sold out in one day). Bryan Luca, the franchisor of The Bra Shop, entered into an agreement with Blundy to buy his three Victorian stores in exchange for Luca's four underperforming Bras N Things outlets in New South Wales and a guarantee to not trade in Victoria. Brazin Limited officially commenced operation after Blundy expanded Bras 'N' Things into South Australia and then Queensland.

In 1990, with Bras 'N' Things expanded to 60 stores around the country, Luca started to progressively sell his remaining Victorian Bra Shop outlets to Blundy in groups of six at a time with all eventually being sold and renamed to Bras 'N' Things.

In May 1999, Brazin created Viva Lingerie, targeting a different demographic to Bras 'N' Things – the former, focused on young, price-conscious women. Also in that year, Brazin acquired another nine lingerie retail stores from Triumph International.

By the end of 2008, BBRC sold its controlling interest in Bras 'N' Things to ANZ and IMF Investors.

In November 2013, Blundy and Sanity owner Ray Itaoui each bought 50 per cent stakes in Bras N Things from ANZ and IMF Investors. Announcing the deal, Blundy said to the media, "Today, more than ever, I believe in Bras 'N' Things and our business model. I believe in our customer and I believe in our people." Asked about Itaoui, he added, "Ray has done a remarkable job with Sanity. We have always worked well together and I'm excited about our next venture taking Bras 'N' Things to the next level."

In March 2016, Bras N Things expanded to South Africa, opening a store in Johannesburg.

In February 2018, Bras N Things was sold to Hanes Australasia for an estimated A$500 million.

In July 2026, Blundy's BB FIT Investments agreed to purchase Hanesbrands Australia from Gildan for A$700 million.
