= Garry Johnson =

British Army general (1937–2026)

General Sir Garry Johnson KCB OBE MC
- Born: 20 September 1937; Twickenham, Surrey, England
- Died: 9 November 2026 (aged 89)
- Military career
- Allegiance: United Kingdom
- Branch: British Army
- Rank: General
- Commands: Allied Forces Northern Europe; British Forces in Hong Kong; 11th Armoured Brigade
- Conflicts: Malaysian Emergency
- Awards: Knight Commander of the Order of the Bath; Officer of the Order of the British Empire; Military Cross

General Sir Garry Dene Johnson, KCB, OBE, MC (20 September 1937 – 9 November 2026) was a British Army officer who served as Commander-in-Chief of Allied Forces Northern Europe from 1992 to 1994.

== Military career ==
Johnson was commissioned into the 10th Princess Mary's Own Gurkha Rifles in 1956. He served in Malaysia during the Malaysian Emergency. In 1981 he was made commander of the 11th Armoured Brigade.

In 1985 Johnson was selected to be Assistant Chief of Defence Staff. He moved on to be Commander of British Forces in Hong Kong in 1987, before being appointed Commander for Training and Arms Directors in 1989. In 1992 he became Commander-in-Chief Allied Forces Northern Europe, and retired in 1994.

He was Regimental Colonel of the 10th Princess Mary's Own Gurkha Rifles from 1985 to 1994.

Johnson was awarded the Pingat Jasa Malaysia Medal by the King and Government of Malaysia, the Order of the Cross of Terra Mariana of Estonia and, in 1999, the Order of the Three Stars 3rd Class of Latvia.

== Death ==
Johnson died from pneumonia on 9 November 2026, aged 89.

Military offices
Preceded by Anthony Boam	Commander of British Forces in Hong Kong; 1987–1989	Succeeded by Sir Peter Duffell
Preceded by Sir Patrick Palmer	Commander-in-Chief Allied Forces Northern Europe; 1992–1994	Post disbanded
