= Nick Scali Furniture =

Australian furniture retail chain

- Type: Public
- Traded as: ASX: NCK
- Industry: Retail
- Headquarters: North Ryde, New South Wales, Australia
- Number of locations: 132 stores (2026)
- Area served: Australia; New Zealand; United Kingdom
- Key people: John Ingram (Non-Executive chairman); Anthony Scali (managing director); William (Bill) Koeck (Non- Executive Director); Carole Molyneux (Non- Executive Director); Kathy Parsons (Non- Executive Director); Stephen Goddard (Furniture Design Director); Kylie Archer (chief financial officer)
- Products: Furniture
- Net income: AUD$101.1 million (2023); AUD$75 million (2022)
- Number of employees: 730 approx. (June 2024)
- Website: nickscali.com.au

Nick Scali Limited is a publicly listed Australian company that imports and retails furniture such as lounge suites, dining tables, coffee tables, chairs, and entertainment units. It was founded in 1962 by Nick D. Scali.

The company specialises in leather and fabric lounges. They sell dining room and bedroom furniture as well. Nick Scali operate multiple showrooms and distribution centres across all states and territories in Australia. In 2017 Nick Scali opened its first showroom in Auckland, New Zealand.

In November 2021, Nick Scali acquired Plush-Think Sofas Pty Ltd business from Greenlit Brands for $110 million.

Nick Scali resigned 27 October 2016.

Nick Scali entered the UK market in May 2024 through its acquisition of Anglia Home Furnishings, which trades as Fabb Furniture. The company plans to rebrand the 21 Fabb Furniture stores as Nick Scali, establish a new distribution centre and open new stores. As of March 2025, five Fabb Furniture stores have been fully rebranded to Nick Scali.

== Stores and distribution centres ==
As of March 2025, there are 64 Nick Scali stores and 43 Plush locations across Australia and New Zealand, and a further 5 Nick Scali stores in the United Kingdom.

As of 30 June 2016 there were six distribution centres under Nick Scali Ltd, and the company continues to expand Australia-wide and into New Zealand.

== Company information ==
The company reported a sales revenue increase of 15% for the Financial Year 2023, reaching $507 million. The company's gross margin increased by 250 basis points to 63.5% for the Financial Year 2023. Plush gross margin increased by 7.9% from the prior year.
