= Oz Hair and Beauty =

Oz Hair & Beauty
- Type: Private
- Industry: Retail
- Founded: 2012
- Founder: Anthony Nappa
- Headquarters: Sydney, Australia
- Number of locations: 34 stores (2026)
- Area served: Australia
- Key people: Anthony Nappa (CEO); Guy Nappa (COO)
- Products: Hair care and beauty products
- Revenue: A$100 million+ (2026)
- Number of employees: ~500 (2026)
- Website: ozhairandbeauty.com ozhairandbeauty.nz

Oz Hair and Beauty is an Australian hair and beauty retailer headquartered in Sydney, selling online and in physical stores.

== History ==
Elio and Venessa Nappa opened a hair salon trading as OZ Hair in Sydney's Queen Victoria Building in 1986. Their son Anthony Nappa founded the Oz Hair & Beauty e-commerce business in 2012 as an eBay store at age 19. Anthony Nappa's brother Guy Nappa joined the company in 2017 and became its chief operating officer.

In October 2021, businessman Brett Blundy, Accent Group chief executive Daniel Agostinelli, and the Edison Growth Fund acquired stakes for an undisclosed sum.

In April 2023, the company opened stores at Erina Fair and Castle Towers in New South Wales. By March 2024, it operated six physical stores in New South Wales.

By March 2026, annual revenue exceeded A$100 million and the workforce was about 500 staff. In May and June 2026, it opened stores in Mandurah, Rockingham, Townsville and Hobart, its first in Western Australia and Tasmania.

As of July 2026, the company store foot print reached 34 stores.

== Operations ==
Anthony Nappa is chief executive, Guy Nappa is chief operating officer, and the company operates a warehouse in Caringbah in southern Sydney.

== Awards ==
Oz Hair and Beauty won the Best Multichannel Retailer award at the 2024 Australia Post Online Retail Industry Awards.
