= BridgeClimb Sydney =

Australian tourist attraction

Coordinates: 33°51′08″S 151°12′39″E

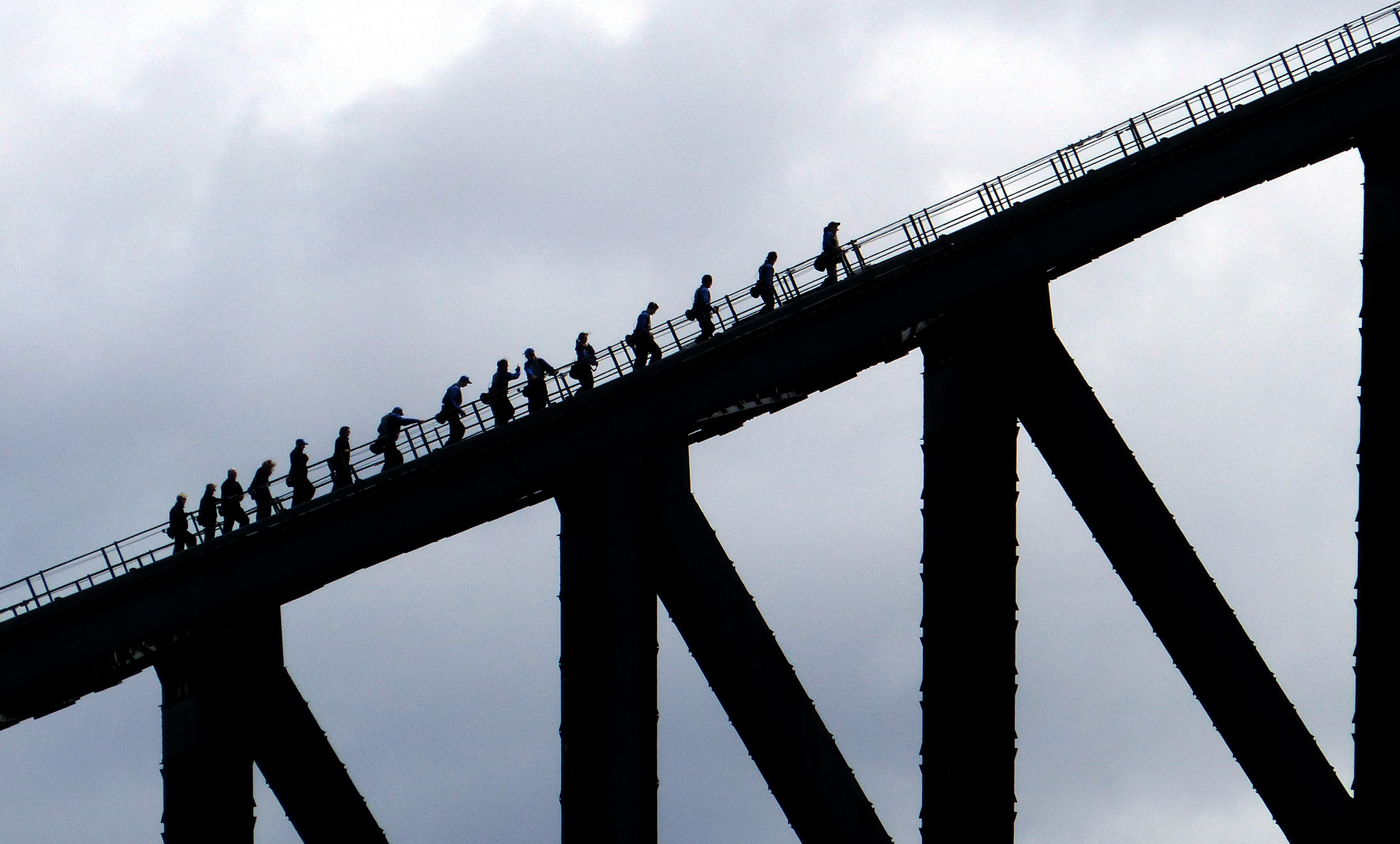
- Climbers on the Sydney Harbour Bridge
- Industry: Tourism
- Founded: 1 October 1998
- Founder: Paul Cave
- Headquarters: Sydney, Australia
- Website: www.bridgeclimb.com

BridgeClimb Sydney is an Australian tourist attraction located in Sydney, New South Wales. It was launched in October 1998 and consists of a climb of the Sydney Harbour Bridge.

== Climbs offered ==
=== The BridgeClimb ===
The BridgeClimb, established in 1998, is the original climb. It goes to the top of the bridge along the upper arch of the bridge and takes approximately three hours, including preparation time.

=== BridgeClimb Insider ===
The BridgeClimb Insider guides guests to the interior of the steel bridge and then to the top in roughly 2.5 hours.

=== Ultimate Climb ===
The Ultimate Climb sees climbers traverse the entire bridge from South to North, and back again.

=== Burrawa ===
In 2021 BridgeClimb launched Burrawa, which focuses on commentary covering the indigenous history of Sydney Harbour with an indigenous storyteller as their guide.

The different climbs are available at dawn, daytime, twilight and night plus special climbs for some of Sydney's events, like the Vivid Climb and the Anzac Day Dawn Climb.

There have been over 4,000 proposals at the summit of the bridge and couples also have the option to get married on the bridge, 134 m (440 ft) above Sydney Harbour. The experience has also attracted many famous actors, musicians and members of royalty including Matt Damon, Kylie Minogue, Zac Efron, Robert De Niro, Prince Harry, Oprah Winfrey and Ben Stiller.

Anyone over the age of eight years and in good health can climb. There is no maximum age, with the oldest climber being 100 years old. To book a climb, visitors can visit the website, and the price is from 198 Australian dollars.

== History ==
The concept of BridgeClimb originated in 1989 when BridgeClimb's Founder and Chairman, Paul Cave, assisted in organising a Young Presidents Organisation World Congress in Sydney, which included a climb over the Sydney Harbour Bridge. Following this event, Cave decided to establish climbing the Sydney Harbour Bridge as a permanent attraction. This initiative involved numerous years of collaboration with state and local government bodies, community groups, and various experts on safety, logistics, media, heritage, and conservation matters. After nearly a decade of research and development, BridgeClimb Sydney was officially launched on 1 October 1998. At that time, BridgeClimb became the world's first tourism operator to offer bridge climbing as an experience.

In June 2018 the franchise was awarded to Hammon's Holdings the proprietors of Scenic World for 20 years following a formal tender process.

== Pylon Lookout and Museum ==
The Bridge's Pylon Museum and lookout showcase the history and stories of the Sydney Harbour Bridge through exhibits and interactive displays. This encompasses the narratives of the engineers, designers, skilled tradesmen, and labourers involved in its construction, as well as the 16 men who lost their lives during the process. The exhibition also chronicles the events and individuals involved in the Sydney Harbour Bridge's opening ceremony in 1932. Additionally, the Pylon Lookout is managed by BridgeClimb Sydney. Sydney.

== Awards ==
The company has received several accolades, including a world record for number of flags flown on a bridge recognised by Guinness World Records.

In 2007, BridgeClimb was awarded best "Major Tourist Attraction" at the Qantas Australian Tourism Awards. Lonely Planet has recognised BridgeClimb Sydney as one of the world's top 10 'Biggest Adrenaline Rush' experiences as well as one of the '10 Best Things to Climb'. In 2011 and 2012, BridgeClimb was awarded 'Best Guided Tour in Australia' at the Australian Traveller Readers' Choice Awards. In 2016, BridgeClimb was awarded 'Best Guided Tour in Australia' by the Australian Traveller Reader's Choice Awards and best 'Major tourism Attraction' at the New South Wales Tourism Awards.
