= Brashs =

Australian music company

- Formerly: Braschs
- Traded as: ASX: BSH
- Industry: Retail
- Founded: 1862
- Founder: Marcus Brasch
- Defunct: 1998
- Headquarters: Australia
- Revenue: $300 million (1997)
- Number of employees: 2,000 (1998)

Brashs, formerly Braschs, was an Australian music and electronics retailer. It was founded in 1862 by German Australian Marcus Brasch. The C in the name was dropped during World War I due to anti-Germanic feeling. In addition, the pronunciation of the 'a' was anglicised. The first store in Elizabeth Street, Melbourne specialised in pianos and reed organs and remained the company's flag-ship store until the group's demise. For the latter half of the 19th century and all through the 20th, Brashs remained a leading music house although Victorian-wide expansion did not begin until the mid-1950s and interstate 30 years later, through a combination of acquisitions and new store openings. This resulted in over 100 stores in all states and territories.

== History ==
Brashs first opened in 1862 at 108 Elizabeth Street, Melbourne by Marcus Brasch. Originally it retailed pianos and other musical instruments, with the slogan, "a home is not a home without a piano". Later it would expand its product line to include sheet music.

The business was later taken over by Marcus's son, Alfred Brash. Alfred traded the business through the Great Depression, with an astute idea allowing his customers to repay the debts owed on the pianos over a longer period (20 years rather than five), as it realised that the pianos would be kept in a better condition in the customers' homes than repossessed in his warehouse. Post-World War II, Brash boomed, as it sold refrigerators and took trade-ins on old ice chests. The traded-in ice chests were then on-sold in sales in South Melbourne, then a poor community.

Geoff Brash later took over from his father. By the 1970s, Brashs expanded further, adding vinyl records, pre-recorded and blank cassettes to their line. in the mid-1980s, it stopped selling whitegoods. In an effort to streamline operations, Brashs was split into Brashs, a company that sold audio systems, microwaves and compact discs, and Allans, which focused on musical instruments. Geoff Brash stepped down as executive chairman in 1988 but stayed on as a director. Part of the expansion also included taking over major book chain Angus & Robertson for $20 million. By the 1990s, its product base expanded to selling hi-fi stereos, video cassette recorders, microwaves and televisions. It also resumed selling white goods, and operated stores for a brief time in New Zealand between 1991 and 1992, taking over HMV's stores after they exited the music market.

== Operations ==
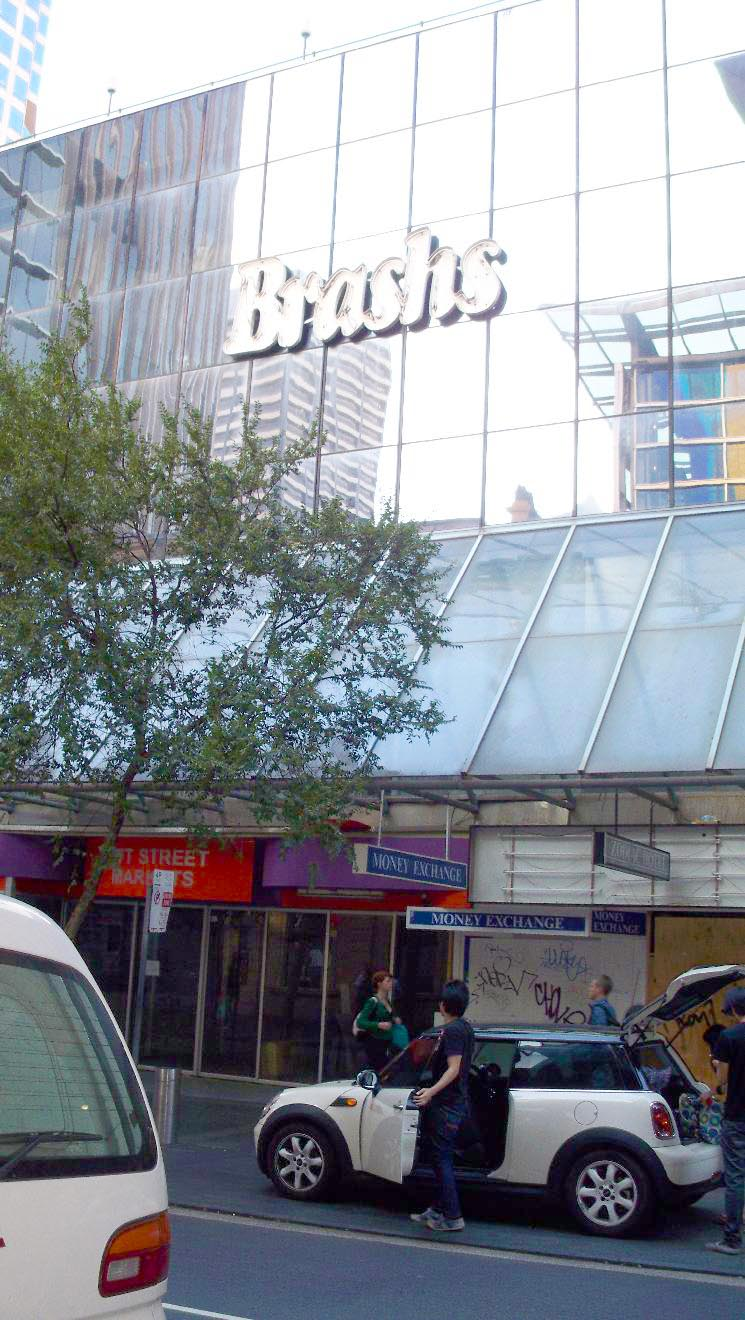
Brashs main flagship store at 244 Pitt Street, Sydney. It was opened in December 1986, then closed in April 1998 when Brashs went into administration. From 1999 to 2009 the building was leased out to several bargain stores. This photo taken in March 2010 shows the building empty, ready for demolition.

On 6 December 1986, Brashs opened Australia's first major megastore at 244 Pitt Street, Sydney. This address now forms part of the plaza of the ANZ Bank Centre.

Brashs struggled from the early 1990s onwards. Its re-entry into the whitegoods market was unsuccessful, and sustained heavy losses. According to Geoff Brash, the last family executive, the problems that caused the collapse were authoritarian leadership, cheapening of values, advertising that did not deliver, over-expansion, faulty management information systems, increased competition and internal conflict.

Brashs was a company listed on the Australian Securities Exchange. In 1994 the Brashs retail chain was placed into voluntary administration. It was delisted and shareholders did not receive any return. Subsequently, it was purchased by the Singapore-based businessman Ong Beng Seng at a cost of $40 million. In February 1998, Brashs was placed in receivership with debts owing of $80 million, with KPMG appointed administrator. At that time the Brashs chain had 105 outlets, employing over 2,000 staff members. Some stores were sold to Brazin Group and The Good Guys.

== Marketing ==
Brashs mainly used television advertising and print for promoting their sales and products. During the late 1980s and early 1990s, Australian television personality Tony Barber appeared in most of the stores' television promotions, when announcing sales on audio and video equipment.

Brashs promoted its products with two print marketing strategies; product catalogues and the Music magazine.

The first was the regular release of sale catalogues that were available in-store. These catalogues mainly covered the hi-fi, audio, video, whitegoods and blank audio and video product lines.
