= Charlie Duffell =

English cricketer (born 1986)

Personal information
- Full name: Charlie Duffell
- Born: 20 October 1986 (age 40); Hanover, Germany
- Height: 6 ft 0 in (1.83 m)
- Batting: Right-handed
- Role: Wicket-keeper

Domestic team information
- Years: Team
- 2007–2009: Oxford UCCE/MCCU

Career statistics
Competition	First-class
Matches	6
Runs scored	90
Batting average	18.00
100s/50s	–/–
Top score	38
Catches/stumpings	6/1
- Source: Cricinfo, 16 August 2011

Charles Basil Royson Duffell (born 20 October 1986) is an English cricketer: a right-handed batsman and wicket-keeper who has played first-class cricket.

== Early life and education ==
Duffell was born in Hanover, Germany to Lieutenant-General Sir Peter Duffell and his wife Ann Murray, daughter of Colonel Basil Bethune Neville Woodd, of a landed gentry family of Shynewood, Shropshire. He was educated at Radley College in Oxfordshire, then at Oxford Brookes University.

== Cricket career ==
He was part of the Middlesex County Cricket Club academy, representing the club at 2nd XI level and played for both Oxford University Centre of Cricketing Excellence and MCC Universities. While studying for a degree in Real Estate and Business management at Oxford Brookes University, Duffell made his first-class debut when Middlesex played against Oxford MCCU in 2007.
