= Chaos.com =

Former Australian online retailer

Chaos.com was an Australian online retailer based in Melbourne, that sold CDs, DVDs, games, books and music downloads over the Internet. Similar to Amazon.com, Chaos.com shipped to all countries around the world. The website was founded in Sydney, Australia by its CEO Rob Appel in 1995, it was the first Australian retailer to sell music over the Internet.

== History ==
Established in 1995 by Rob Appel under the name Chaos Music Market it was one of the pioneers of Australian e-commerce and was able to grow quickly in its early years through an association with Australia's largest ISP at the time, OzEmail. Initially the service was located at the URL www.cmm.com.au, then moved to www.chaosmusic.com in 1998 and finally to www.chaos.com in 2003. The Chaos.com domain was previously registered to Professor Tony Rutkowski and used as a chaos theory discussion area before it was sold to Chaos Group Limited in 2003.

During the dot-com boom Chaos attracted the attention of Sydney entrepreneurs Malcolm Turnbull and David Coe who provided seed capital before the company was listed on the Australian Stock Exchange in December 1999 raising A$15M as set out in the Chaos Music Limited Prospectus. The Chaos board at the time included David Coe (chairman), Rob Appel (CEO), David Spence (OzEmail), Lucy Turnbull (FTR) and Victoria Doidge (marketing executive). Shortly after the listing the dot com crash hit the market the Chaos share price declined substantially over the next 3 years. Chaos continued to grow strongly through this period and was ranked as the fastest-growing company in Australia by Deloitte in the Fast 50 Awards for 2002 due to revenue growth of 5,143% over 3 years. The Chaos website won the Onya Award for Most Popular Australian Online E-Tailer for three years running between 1999 and 2001.

In 2003 the Chaos business was privatized in a management buyout headed by Rob Appel who continued as CEO of the new holding company known as Chaos Entertainment Pty Ltd. The public entity went on to transform itself into an energy retailer known as Australian Power and Gas (ASX: APK).

In 2006, Chaos partnered with Stomp Entertainment for site management, distribution and fulfillment.

Chaos.com continued to offer retail services through its website and by 2010 had a member base of over 350,000. It offered CDs, music downloads, DVDs, books, games and merchandise. Chaos shipped globally and provided payment facilities for most major currencies. It operated the Chaos Artist Network (CAN) which was first launched in 2000 and provided digital and physical distribution services to independent artists. The CAN was often referred to as 'Australia's CDBaby'.

In 2010, Chaos.com partnered with Elan Media Partners for site management, distribution and fulfillment.

In 2012, Élan Media Partners became the majority owner of Chaos.com and relaunched Chaos with a new modern look, cheaper prices and a wider range of products.

In 2016, the Chaos.com website was replaced with a message saying it is undergoing "important maintenance".

In 2017 the Chaos.com website was taken down; returning a, "server DNS address could not be found" with no further activity since.
