= Postie =

Clothing retail chain in New Zealand

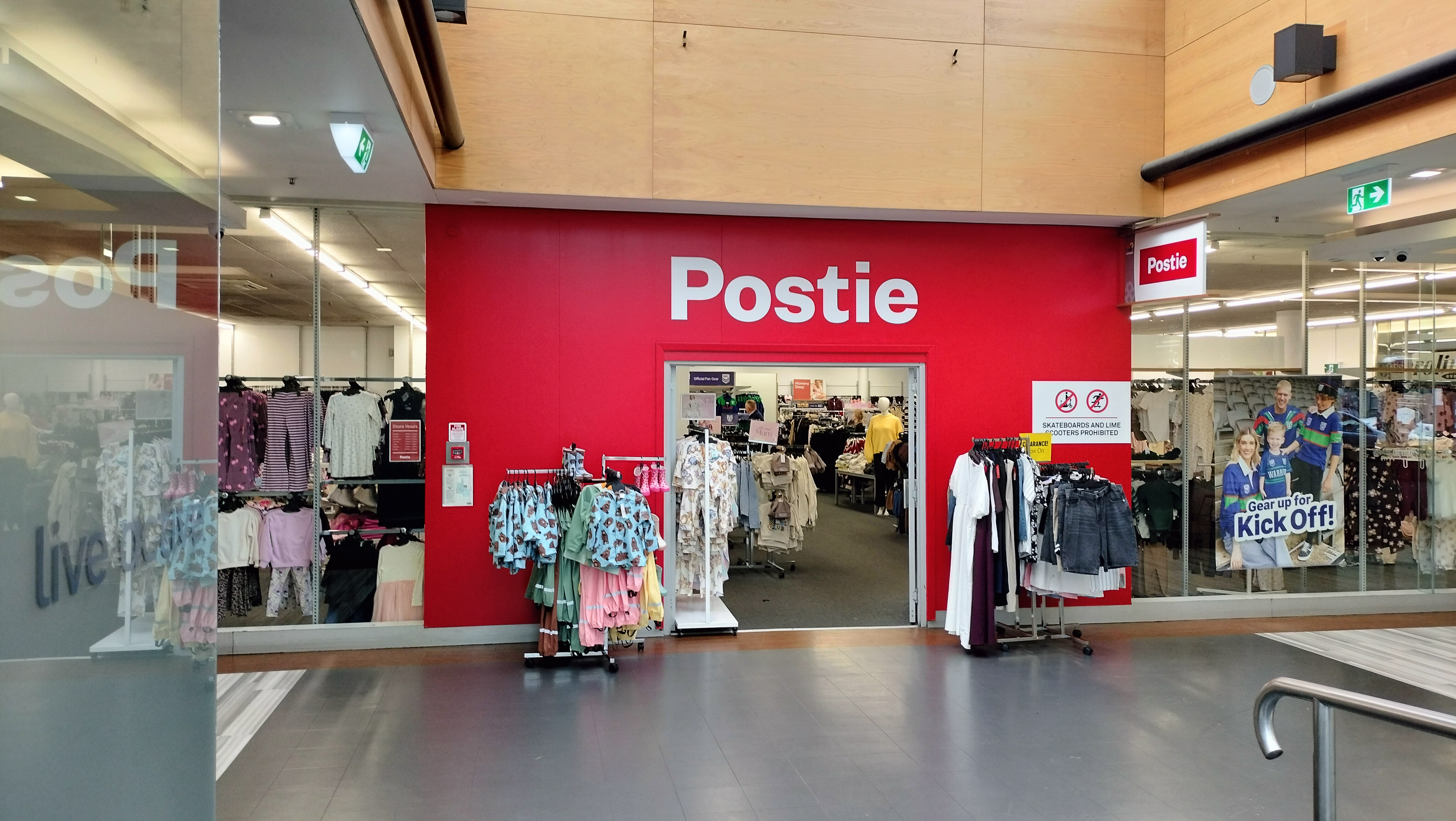
- Postie clothing retailer at Centre City Mall, Dunedin
- Formerly: Postie Plus
- Industry: Retail
- Founded: 1909 in Reefton
- Founder: Thomas Dellaca
- Number of locations: 61 stores (2022)
- Products: Clothing
- Owner: Best & Less Group
- Website: postie.co.nz

Postie, formerly Postie Plus, is a New Zealand clothing store chain. It was founded in 1909 by Thomas Dellaca. As of October 2022, Postie has 61 stores as well as an online platform. Together with Australian retailer Best & Less, it forms the Best & Less Group.

== History ==
The business was founded by Thomas Dellaca as a drapery and boots shop at the Globe Hill goldmine near Reefton in 1909. It moved into Reefton when the mine closed in 1919. A second shop was opened at Westport in 1946 and expanded into dress fabrics, furnishing, knitting supplies, hosiery and womenswear. A shop focusing on fashion was opened in Greymouth in 1979. A mail-order catalogue called Postie Fashions was produced from 1983. A new brand, Clothes for Less, opened a store in Westport in 1988 and expanded across the West Coast region, changing its name to Postie Plus in 1996.

The Postie Plus Group purchased the Arbuckles manchester chain in 2003 for NZ$9.5 million. In September 2003, Postie Plus was floated on the New Zealand stock exchange.

In January 2009, Jan Cameron purchased Arbuckles from Postie. In April 2012, Postie Plus sold its Babycity chain of stores. In January 2014, the company sold its SchoolTex uniform brand to The Warehouse Group for NZ$9 million.

In June 2014, the company was placed in voluntary administration. In July 2014, South African investment company Pepkor acquired Postie. Steinhoff Asia Pacific (later renamed Greenlit Brands) obtained Postie when it acquired Pepkor in November 2014.

In November 2019, private equity firm Allegro Funds acquired Postie from Greenlit Brands.
