= Management buyout =

Purchase of company by existing managers

A management buyout (MBO) is a form of acquisition in which a company's existing managers acquire a large part, or all, of the company, whether from a parent company or individual. Management and leveraged buyouts became noted phenomena of 1980s business economics and most frequently refer to leveraged transactions where managers take a company private. These transactions, while originating in the United States, later spread to the United Kingdom and throughout the rest of Europe. The venture capital industry has played a crucial role in the development of buyouts in Europe, especially in smaller deals in the UK, the Netherlands, and France.

== Overview ==
Management buyouts are similar in all major legal aspects to any other acquisition of a company. The particular nature of the MBO lies in the position of the buyers as managers of the company and the practical consequences that follow from that. In particular, the due diligence process is likely to be limited as the buyers already have full knowledge of the company available to them. The seller is also unlikely to give any but the most basic warranties to the management, on the basis that the management know more about the company than the sellers do and therefore the sellers should not have to warrant the state of the company.

Some concerns about management buyouts are that the asymmetric information possessed by management may offer them unfair advantage relative to current owners. The impending possibility of an MBO may lead to principal–agent problems, moral hazard, and perhaps even the subtle downward manipulation of the stock price prior to sale via adverse information disclosure, including accelerated and aggressive loss recognition, public launching of questionable projects, and adverse earning surprises. These issues make recovery by shareholders who bring suit challenging the MBO more likely than challenges to other kinds of mergers and acquisitions. Naturally, these corporate governance concerns also exist whenever current senior management is able to benefit personally from the sale of their company or its assets. This would include, for example, large parting bonuses for CEOs after a takeover or management buyout.

Since corporate valuation is often subject to considerable uncertainty and ambiguity, and since it can be heavily influenced by asymmetric or inside information, some question the validity of MBOs and consider them to potentially represent a form of insider trading.

The mere possibility of an MBO or a substantial parting bonus on sale may create perverse incentives that can reduce the efficiency of a wide range of firms—even if they remain as public companies. This represents a substantial potential negative externality. The managers of the target company may at times also set up a holding company for the purpose of purchasing the shares of the target company.

== Purpose ==
Management buyouts are conducted by management teams as they want to get the financial reward for the future development of the company more directly than they would do as employees only. A management buyout can also be attractive for the seller as they can be assured that the future stand-alone company will have a dedicated management team thus providing continuity of operations and potentially increasing the likelihood of successful performance post-sale. Additionally, in the case the management buyout is supported by a private equity fund (see below), private equity investors often participate in MBOs to support management and may be willing to pay an attractive price for the asset due to the existing team’s insider knowledge and commitment.

== Financing ==
=== Debt financing ===
The management of a company will not usually have the money available to buy the company outright themselves. They would first seek to borrow from a bank, provided the bank was willing to accept the risk. Management buyouts are frequently seen as too risky for a bank to finance the purchase through a loan. Management teams are typically asked to invest an amount of capital that is significant to them personally, depending on the funding source/banks’ determination of the personal wealth of the management team. The bank then loans the company the remaining portion of the amount paid to the owner.

=== Private equity financing ===
If a bank is unwilling to lend, the management will commonly look to private equity investors to fund the majority of buyout. A high proportion of management buyouts are financed in this way. The private equity investors will invest money in return for a proportion of the shares in the company, though they may also grant a loan to the management. The exact financial structuring will depend on the backer's desire to balance the risk with its return, with debt being less risky but less profitable than capital investment.

Although the management may not have resources to buy the company, private equity houses will require that the managers each make as large an investment as they can afford in order to ensure that the management are locked in by an overwhelming vested interest in the success of the company. It is common for the management to re-mortgage their houses in order to acquire a small percentage of the company.

Private equity backers are likely to have somewhat different goals to the management. They generally aim to maximise their return and make an exit after 3–5 years while minimising risk to themselves, whereas the management rarely look beyond their careers at the company and will take a long-term view.

While certain aims do coincide—in particular the primary aim of profitability—certain tensions can arise. The backers will invariably impose the same warranties on the management in relation to the company that the sellers will have refused to give the management. This "warranty gap" means that the management will bear all the risk of any defects in the company that affect its value.

As a condition of their investment, the backers will also impose numerous terms on the management concerning the way that the company is run. The purpose is to ensure that the management run the company in a way that will maximise the returns during the term of the backers' investment, whereas the management might have hoped to build the company for long-term gains. Though the two aims are not always incompatible, the management may feel restricted.

The European buyout market was worth €43.9bn in 2008, a 60% fall on the €108.2bn of deals in 2007. The last time the buyout market was at this level was in 2001 when it reached just €34bn.

=== Seller financing ===
In certain circumstances, it may be possible for the management and the original owner of the company to agree a deal whereby the seller finances the buyout. The price paid at the time of sale will be nominal, with the real price being paid over the following years out of the profits of the company. The timescale for the payment is typically 3–7 years.

This represents a disadvantage for the selling party, which must wait to receive its money after it has lost control of the company. It is also dependent, if an earn-out is used, on the returned profits being increased significantly following the acquisition, in order for the deal to represent a gain to the seller in comparison to the situation pre-sale.

The vendor agrees to vendor financing for tax reasons, as the consideration will be classified as capital gain rather than as income. It may also receive some other benefit such as a higher overall purchase price than would be obtained by a normal purchase.

The advantage for the management is that they do not need to become involved with private equity or a bank and will be left in control of the company once the consideration has been paid.

== Examples ==
A classic example of an MBO involved Springfield Remanufacturing Corporation, a former plant in Springfield, Missouri, owned by Navistar (at that time, International Harvester) which was in danger of being closed or sold to outside parties until its managers purchased the company.

In the UK, New Look was the subject of a management buyout in 2004 by Tom Singh, the founder of the company who had floated it in 1998. He was backed by private equity houses Apax and Permira, who sold their roughly 90% stake to Brait SE in May 2015 for £780 million. An earlier example of this in the UK was the management buyout of Virgin Interactive from Viacom which was led by Mark Dyne.

The Virgin Group has undergone several management buyouts in recent years. On September 17, 2007, Richard Branson announced that the UK arm of Virgin Megastores was to be sold off as part of a management buyout, and from November 2007, will be known by a new name, Zavvi. On September 24, 2008, another part of the Virgin group, Virgin Comics underwent a management buyout and changed its name to Liquid Comics. In the UK, Virgin Radio also underwent a similar process and became Absolute Radio.

In Australia, another group of music and entertainment stores were subject to a management buyout in September 2009, when Sanity's owner and founder, Brett Blundy, sold BB Retail Capital's Entertainment Division (including Sanity, and the Australian franchises of Virgin Entertainment and HMV) to the company's Head of Entertainment, Ray Itaoui. This was for an undisclosed sum, leaving Sanity Entertainment to become a private company in its own right.

Hitman is a stealth video game series developed by the Danish company IO Interactive, which was previously published by Eidos Interactive and Square Enix. IO Interactive remained a subsidiary of Square Enix until 2017, when Square Enix started seeking buyers for the studio, IO Interactive completed a management buyout, regaining their independent status and retaining the rights for Hitman, in June 2017.

== See also ==
- Takeover
- Management buy-in
- Leveraged buyout - includes secondary buyout
- Envy ratio
- Outline of organizational theory
