= Peter Duffell (British Army officer) =

British Army general

Lieutenant-General Sir Peter Duffell KCB CBE MC
- Born: 19 June 1939 (age 87)
- Military career
- Allegiance: United Kingdom
- Branch: British Army
- Rank: Lieutenant-General
- Commands: Commander of British Forces in Hong Kong
- Conflicts: Malayan Emergency; Indonesia–Malaysia confrontation Operation Banner
- Awards: Knight Commander of the Order of the Bath; Commander of the Order of the British Empire; Military Cross

Lieutenant-General Sir Peter Royson Duffell KCB CBE MC (born 19 June 1939) was Commander of British Forces in Hong Kong.

== Military career ==
Educated at Dulwich College, Duffell was commissioned into the 2nd Gurkha Rifles in 1960. He served with his Regiment in Malaya during the Malayan Emergency and in Borneo during the Indonesia–Malaysia confrontation as well as in Northern Ireland. He was appointed Commander of British Forces in Hong Kong in 1989 and then became Inspector-General Doctrine and Training in 1992. He retired from the Army in 1995.

== Later life ==
Following his retirement from the Army, he became Chief Executive of Dechert LLP. He was also a member of the advisory board of the School of Oriental and African Studies and a Trustee of The Foyle Foundation.

== Personal life ==
Duffell married Ann Murray Woodd, daughter of Colonel Basil Bethune Neville Woodd, of a landed gentry family of Shynewood, Shropshire; they have a son, the cricketer Charlie Duffell, and daughter, Rachel.

== Works ==
- Duffell, Peter (2019), Gurkha Odyssey: Campaigning for the Crown, Pen & Sword (with illustrations by Ken Howard)

Military offices
Preceded by Sir Garry Johnson	Commander of British Forces in Hong Kong; 1989–1992	Succeeded by Sir John Foley
