= Universal Store =

Australian fashion retail company

Universal Store Holdings Limited

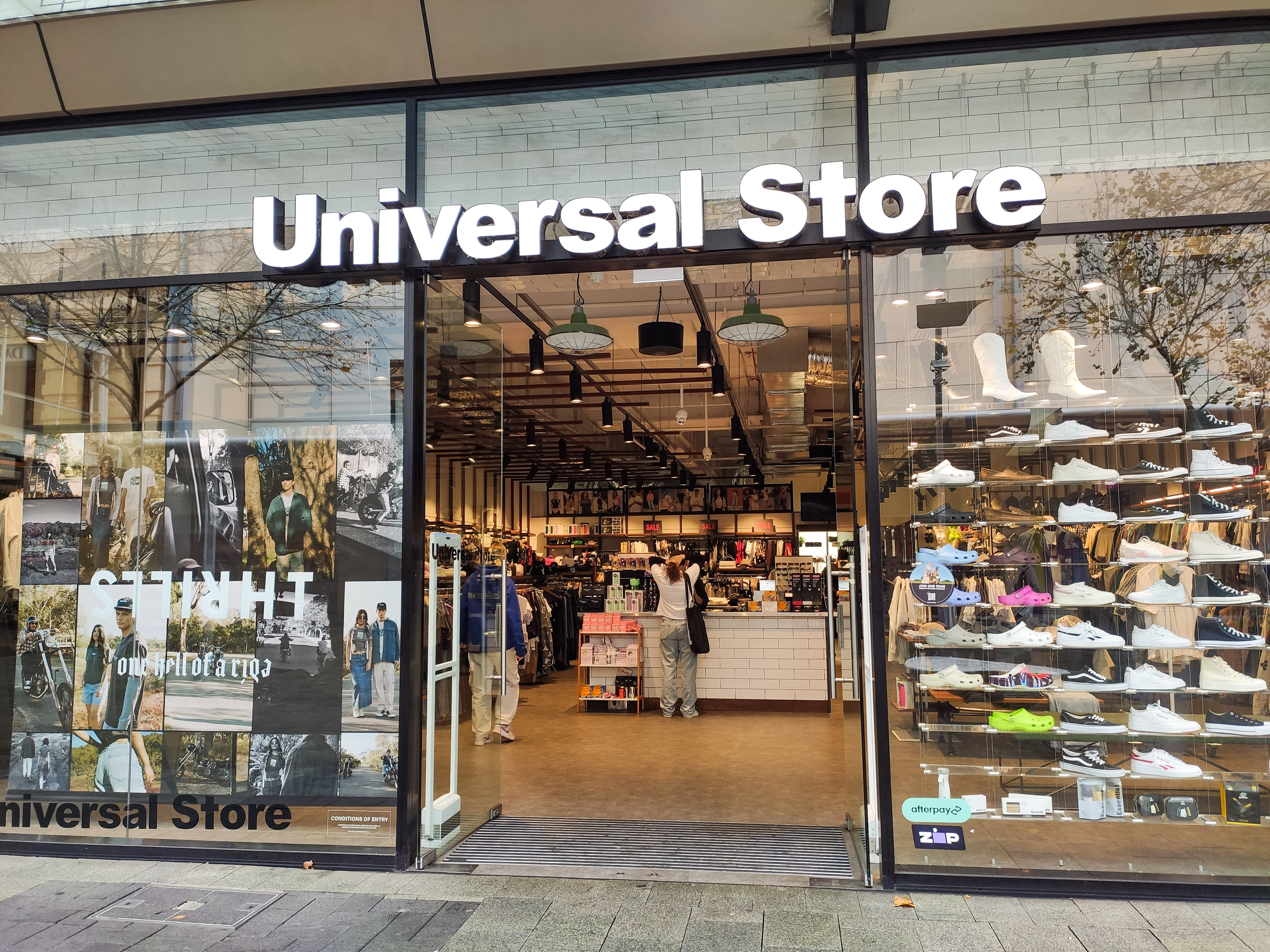
- Universal Store in the Perth CBD
- Type: Public
- Traded as: ASX: UNI
- Industry: Fashion retail
- Founded: 1999; 27 years ago
- Founders: Greg Josephson; Michael Josephson
- Headquarters: Brisbane, Australia
- Number of locations: 118 stores (2025)
- Key people: Alice Barbery (CEO); Peter Birtles (chairman)
- Website: universalstore.com

Universal Store Holdings Limited is an Australian fashion retail company. It operates stores under the Universal Store, Thrills and Perfect Stranger names. The company was founded in 1999 by brothers Greg and Michael Josephson. It was purchased by private equity investors in 2018 before going public on the ASX in 2020. As of 31 December 2025, there were 87 Universal stores, 22 Perfect Stranger stores and 9 Thrills stores around Australia.

== History ==
Universal Store was founded in 1999 by brothers Greg and Michael Josephson. They opened their first store in the Brisbane suburb of Carindale.

In 2018, the business was purchased by a consortium of three private equity investors for an estimated $100 million. The company floated on the Australian Securities Exchange (ASX) on 17 November 2020. In September 2022, Universal Store acquired Cheap Thrills Cycles – the company behind the brand Thrills – for $50 million.

== Stores ==
=== Universal Store ===
Universal Store sells clothing aimed at 15–34 year olds. It stocks products from brands such as Herschel, Wrangler, Converse, Abrand and Kiss Chacey. It also sells its own private label brands which include Perfect Stranger, Luck & Trouble, Common Need and Token. As of 31 December 2025, there were 87 Universal stores.

=== Perfect Stranger ===
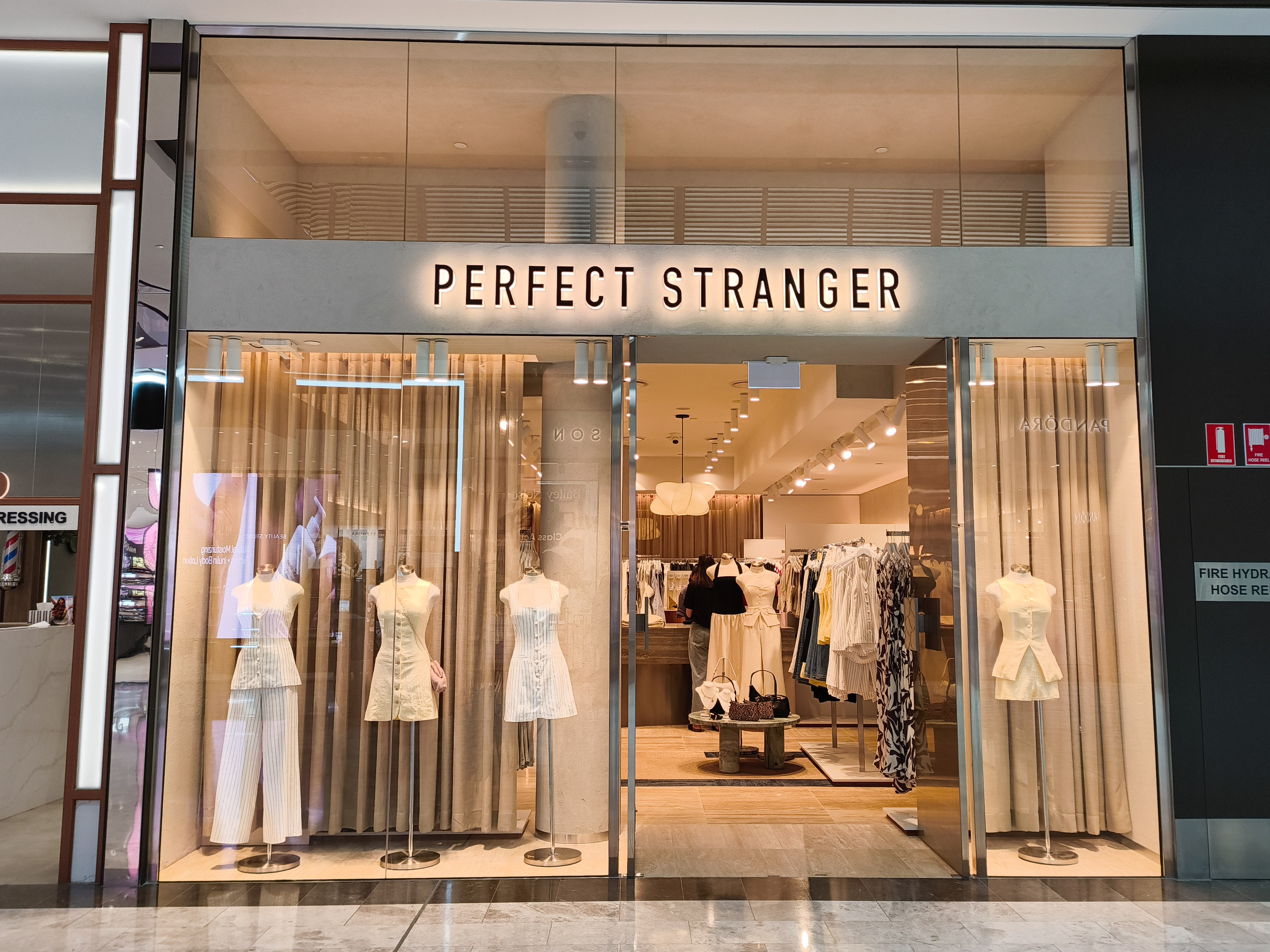
Perfect Stranger store in Westfield Carousel

Perfect Stranger is a womenswear brand founded in 2014. Its first retail store opened in 2020. As of 31 December 2025, there were 22 Perfect Stranger stores.

=== Thrills ===
Thrills was founded in 2011 by Brooke McGregor, Tabitha McGregor and Ryan Collins. The brand sells vintage-inspired apparel with a focus on sustainable fabrics and production. The company started as a vintage motorcycle import business but the popularity of their first T-shirt collection led them to shift to fashion. The company's first retail store was opened in 2014 in Byron Bay. In 2020, the company expanded to Japan with a store in Tokyo and in 2021 the brand was made available through stockists in the United States. Thrills was acquired by Universal Store in September 2022. As of 31 December 2025, there were nine Thrills stores.
