= Brett Blundy =

Australian billionaire businessman

- Born: 1959 or 1960 (age 66–67)
- Citizenship: Australia
- Occupations: Businessman; Grazier
- Known for: BB Retail Capital; Sanity Entertainment; BridgeClimb Sydney
- Spouse: Vanessa Speer
- Children: 2

Brett Blundy (born 1959/1960) is an Australian billionaire businessman. He is the founder and former chairman of BB Retail Capital, which owns companies such as Sanity Entertainment, Bras N Things, and Aventus Property Group. He is part-owner of BridgeClimb Sydney, one of Australia's biggest tourist attractions.

== Career ==
Blundy aspired to be a pilot; however, he failed to obtain the necessary results during high school. Aged 20 years, Blundy, together with a friend, bought a record store in Pakenham, called "Disco Duck". The business failed, and they had to take on day jobs to support the business venture. Blundy went on to form BB Retail Capital (BBRC), now known as Sanity Entertainment Group.

In 2005, Blundy purchased Diva, a fashion jewellery store founded by Colette and Mark Hayman. Diva had close to 200 stores in Australia and New Zealand and 400 in international markets. In 2010, he launched Lovisa, a fast fashion jewellery brand. As of July 2023, Lovisa had 801 stores across 39 countries. In 2015 Blundy expanded his business operations into cattle farming. In early 2018, Bras N Things was sold to the US company Hanesbrands. As of June 2024, Blundy owned around 11 per cent of City Chic Collective and also owned around 13 per cent of Victoria's Secret.

In October 2021, Blundy (along with Accent Group chief executive Daniel Agostinelli, and the Edison Growth Fund) acquired a stake in Oz Hair and Beauty for an undisclosed sum.

== Personal life ==
Blundy grew up on a farm in rural Victoria, where he and his four siblings would pick mushrooms to sell from a roadside stall.

Blundy is married with two children, and lives in Monaco. Blundy has previously lived in Sydney, Singapore and the Bahamas.

Blundy previously owned a 74-metre (242 ft) megayacht, Cloud 9.

=== Net worth ===
Year	Financial Review Rich List		Forbes Australia's 50 Richest	
Year	Rank	Net worth (A$)	Rank	Net worth (US$)
2017		$1.39 billion	42 ▼	$645 million ▼
2018	41 ▲	$1.71 billion ▲	33 ▲	
2019	39 ▲	$2.00 billion ▲	29 ▲	$1.44 billion ▲
2020	37 ▲	$2.20 billion ▲		
2021	39 ▼	$2.65 billion ▲		
2022	32 ▲	$3.30 billion ▲		
2023	36 ▼	$3.33 billion ▲		
2024	34 ▼	$3.60 billion ▲		
2025	38 ▼	$3.95 billion ▲	28	$2.10 billion

Legend
Icon	Description
Steady	Has not changed from the previous year
▲	Has increased from the previous year
▼	Has decreased from the previous year
