= Fantastic Furniture =

Australian furniture store chain

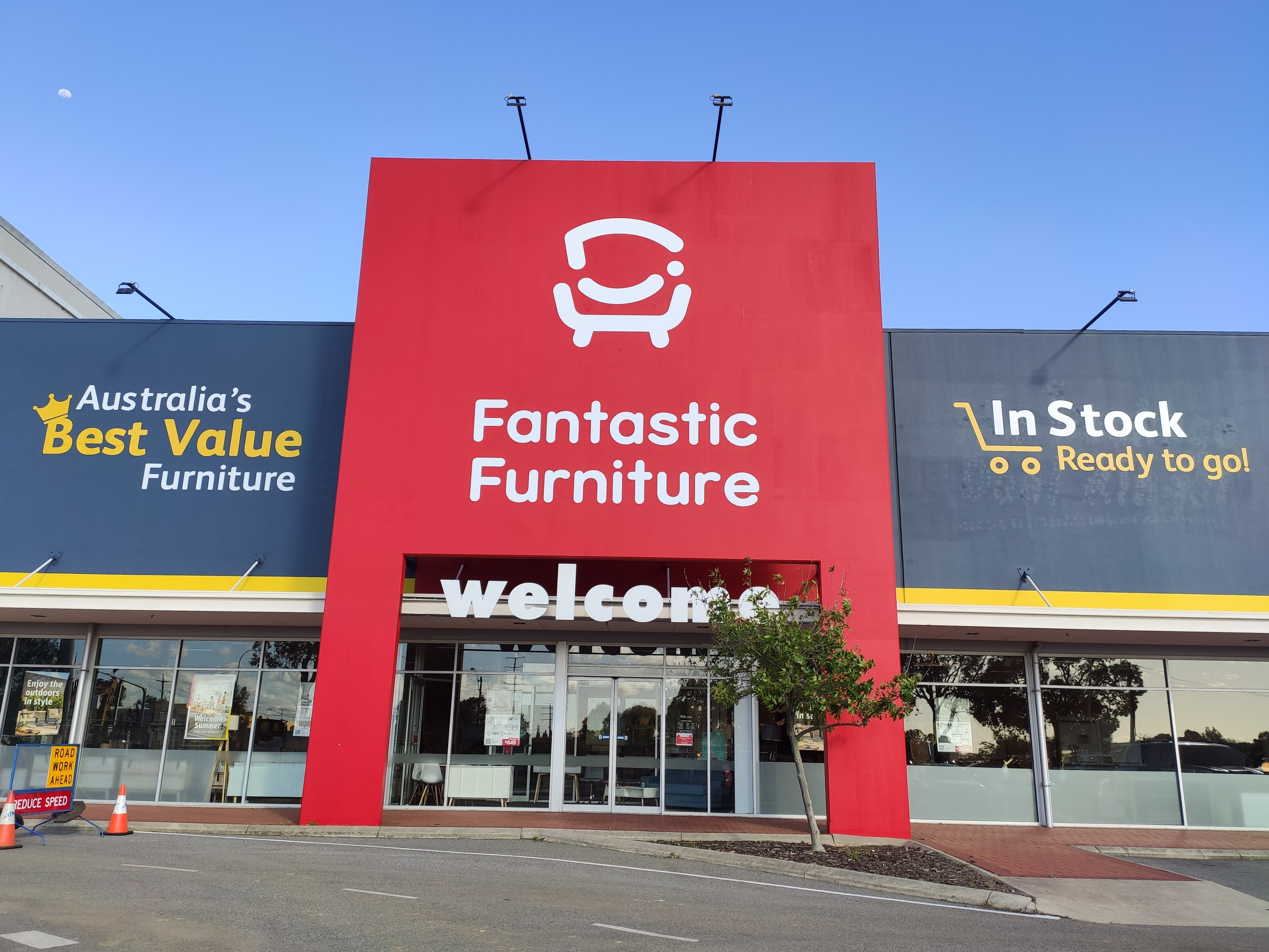
- Fantastic Furniture store in Beckenham
- Industry: Manufacturing and Retailing
- Founded: 1989; 37 years ago
- Headquarters: Chullora, New South Wales, Australia
- Number of locations: 89 stores (2026)
- Area served: Australia
- Key people: Kieron Ritchard (CEO)
- Products: Household furniture
- Number of employees: 1,000+ (2019)
- Parent: Allegro Funds
- Website: fantasticfurniture.com.au

Fantastic Furniture is an Australian furniture retail chain. Founded in 1989, it has more than 80 stores around the country. It is owned by Allegro Funds.

== History ==
Fantastic Furniture started as a market stall at Sydney's Parklea Markets in 1989, by friends Paul Harding and Jonathan De Jong, selling outdoor furniture. Two years later, the first Fantastic Furniture public store opened at Birkenhead Point.

In 1992, the Fantastic Lounge Factory opened and started production of Australian made sofas and lounges for Fantastic Furniture. At one point the factory was the largest manufacturer of sofas in the Southern Hemisphere producing over 130,000 sofas and lounges each year. The factory closed in October 2026, with all production shifted to China and Vietnam.

In the following years, the business could not keep up with the demand and in 1996 it went into administration. The business was subsequently acquired by Peter Brennan, Peter Draper and Julian Tertini and underwent a restructure. Over the next few years a number of Fantastic Furniture stores opened across NSW.

In 2006, Fantastic Furniture acquired Royal Comfort Bedding (RCB), a NSW mattress manufacturer, to produce its mattress range in Australia.

In August 2017, Fantastic Furniture partnered with CB2 x Fred Segal. In 2016, it was included in the takeover of Furniture Holdings by Steinhoff International and delisted from the Australian Securities Exchange.

Fantastic Furniture was acquired by private equity firm Allegro Funds in May 2026.

== Controversies ==
In September 2015 it was reported that a dining chair sold by Fantastic Furniture had cut off an individual's toe after being caught in the inner side of one of the chair legs. In January 2016 Fantastic Furniture was forced by the Australian Competition & Consumer Commission (ACCC) to recall the chair.
