= Best & Less =

Australian clothing store chain

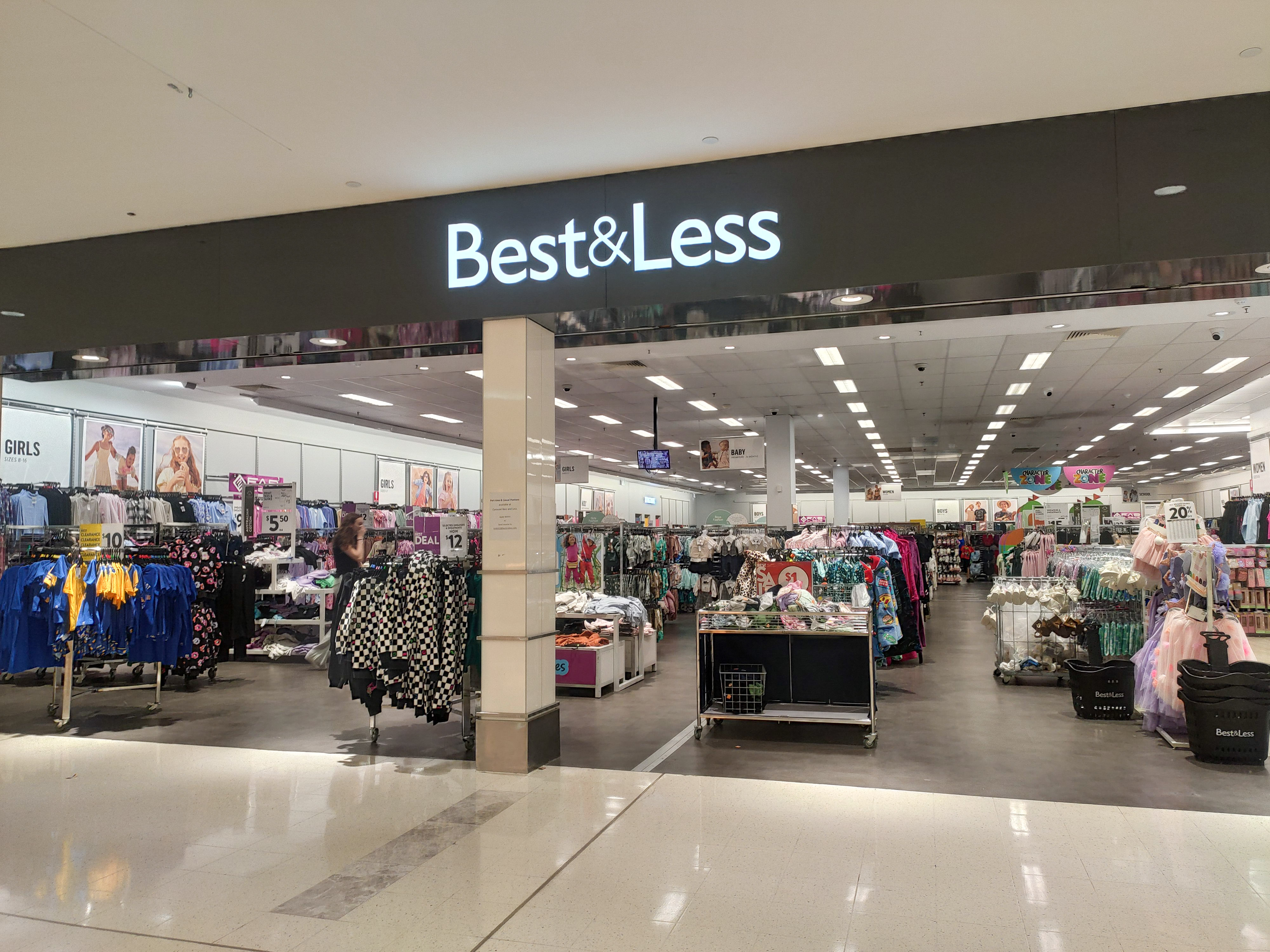
- Best & Less store in Westfield Carousel
- Type: Private
- Industry: Retail
- Founded: 1965; 61 years ago
- Headquarters: Leichhardt, New South Wales, Australia
- Number of locations: 182 stores (2022)
- Owner: BB Retail Capital
- Number of employees: Over 3,000
- Website: bestandless.com.au

Best & Less is an Australian retailer of clothing and household linens. As of October 2022, Best & Less has 182 stores as well as an online platform.

== History ==
Best & Less was founded by Berel Ginges in January 1965, by occupying part of the ground floor of the department store "Snows" which was in the process of closing down. Prior to trading as Best & Less, the store was known as "Shenows". Best & Less officially opened their first store in Parramatta on 27 May 1965.

Best & Less was known for its frugal in-store appearance, with minimal fixtures, and its advertising tagline was "You don't pay for any fancy overheads". The ads often featured Joy Muir, then president of the Australian Housewives' Association, delivering the line to cameras.

In 1998, Best & Less was acquired by the South African investment company Pepkor. Steinhoff Asia Pacific (later renamed Greenlit Brands) obtained Best & Less when it acquired Pepkor in 2014.

In December 2019, Allegro Funds acquired Best & Less from Greenlit Brands.

== Best & Less Group ==
Best & Less Group is the holding company which comprises Best & Less and the New Zealand clothing chain Postie. It was floated on the Australian Securities Exchange in July 2021 under the code BST.

In February 2023, CEO Rodney Orrock left the company to focus on his health.

BB Retail Capital acquired Best & Less in July 2023.
