= Ian Duffell =

British businessman

Ian Duffell, is an English businessman with international experience in the entertainment and leisure industries. Initially, he worked in the UK as a Marketing Executive for Sony Corporation with responsibility for launching products such as the Walkman and Compact Disc. Moving into the music industry, Ian was appointed as Managing Director of HMV, opening the world's largest music store in 1986. His international career began in 1987 as CEO of Virgin Entertainment Group heading up the company's expansion into the Asia-Pacific region. In 1992 he relocated to the United States of America opening more than 20 Virgin Megastores in a six-year period, including the landmark Times Square, New York store. with combined annualised revenue exceeding $200 million.

In 2001 he relocated back to Australia and joined ASX-listed Brazin Ltd as Managing Director, with a mandate to restructure the retail portfolio and internationally expand Sanity, the music retail business. Following this success, he was a partner in the development of a large five star beachfront resort in Canggu, Bali until its sale in 2014. Since then, he has been involved with various technology ventures and is currently developing an asset-backed blockchain initiative.
