= Australian Shareholders' Association =

Australian not-for-profit organisation

- Founded: 1960; 66 years ago
- Type: Non-profit organisation
- Location: Sydney, Australia
- Key people: Michael Jackson (Chair), Rachel Waterhouse (CEO)
- Website: australianshareholders.com.au

Australian Shareholders' Association (ASA) is an Australian not-for-profit organisation which advocates for the rights of retail shareholders. Founded in 1960 in Sydney, ASA provides educational resources and professional learning opportunities for its members, who are largely independent small-scale investors.

ASA's most prominent public role, however, is in the research and publication of recommendations that members can use to inform their votes on such matters as executive pay and director re-elections. This role brought ASA under the scrutiny of an inquiry into the role of proxy advisors launched by Australian Treasurer Josh Frydenberg in May 2021. ASA does not believe itself to be a proxy advisor, given its not-for-profit status, as well as the fact that its research is published as 'intentions' rather than recommendations.

Most recently, ASA has been one of the primary advocates against a Federal Government proposal to loosen disclosure requirements for directors of public companies, on the basis of their belief that the proposal "threatens the rights of investors".

ASA's funding comes from membership fees, as well as donations and sponsorships. Sponsors for its 2020 conference included controversial mining company BHP and investment fund provider Fidelity International.

== Industry groups and committees ==
The ASA represents shareholder and member interests on the following industry groups and committees:

- AASB Disclosure Initiative Project Advisory Panel
- ASIC Consumer Advisory Panel (CAP)
- ASIC Regional Liaison Committee
- ASX Corporate Governance Council
- ASX CHESS Replacement project
- ATO Individual Stewardship Group
- Business Reporting Leaders Forum (BRLF)
- Corporate Reporting Users Forum
- Security Registrars Association of Australia

== Achievements ==
ASA claims the following achievements, among others:

- advocating for regulatory reform, including the introduction of the 'two strikes rule', which requires non-managing directors of public companies to be immediately re-elected if two consecutive AGMs vote down their remuneration package
- being the dominant voice at AGMs as the voice of retail shareholders
- encouraging directors of public companies to reduce their board workload to reasonable levels, allowing them to focus on the boards on which they remain

== Membership ==
As of the end of 2020, ASA had 5,001 members, up slightly from the end of 2019.

== Leadership ==
ASA is led by CEO Rachel Waterhouse, and is overseen by a board of directors.

=== Board of directors ===
The board of directors is composed of:

- Steven Mabb (2020- present; was appointed Chair 2022)
- Michael Jackson
- Richard Goldman
- Julieanne Mills
- Karl Schlobohm
- Anthea Cudworth
- Geoff McClelland
- Eve Tusa
