= Leading Edge Group =

- Type: Private
- Industry: Books; Computers; Electronics; Appliances; Jewellery; Entertainment; Music
- Founded: 1986
- Headquarters: Chatswood, New South Wales; Australia
- Key people: Charlie Davey (CEO)
- Website: www.leadingedgegroup.com.au

Leading Edge Group is an Australian-owned consumer electronics buying group with retail shopfronts. It was founded in 1986 as Electronic Enterprises.

The group works with suppliers and retailers of computers, appliances, electronics, entertainment, books and jewellery, providing them with a single point of contact and invoicing to a range of regional and remote small businesses without the need for physical visits and hiring representatives.

== History ==
In 1997, a range of buying groups consolidated under the brand name of the Leading Edge Group, making it one of the largest retail entities in Australia. Leading Edge Group is a global organisation operating in buying group management and sales channel management across Australia, New Zealand and the United Kingdom.

In December 2023, Leading Edge Retail promoted Charlie Davey to CEO of its Australian operation following the resignation of Lee Scott.

== Leading Edge Business Solutions ==
Leading Edge Business Solutions is a B2B proposition which aims to connect businesses without in-house procurement teams to suppliers of audiovisual and IT products.

== Leading Edge Group New Zealand ==
Leading Edge Group New Zealand was a sales and marketing channel management company. They had previously partnered with large corporations such as Genesis, The Yellow Group and Spark, offering sales and marketing services to SMEs across an array of productised services. Leading Edge Group entered the New Zealand market by acquiring 15 retail and business outlets and became the largest independent channel partner for Spark New Zealand. As part of the Global Leading Edge Group, they provided mobility, landline, broadband and ICT-related products and services. Leading Edge Group also worked on the sales and support channel role for n3.

== Leading Edge Group Electronics ==
Leading Edge Group Electronics is a buying group of around 48 former Dick Smith Electronics (DSE) stores. These privately owned resellers changed suppliers in a major move against Australian electronics giant DSE in October 2004 after the resellers were informed that their contracts would not be renewed and in many instances that a DSE company owned store would be opening in the town in competition with them.

== Leading Edge Group UK ==
In the UK, Leading Edge Group operates as an outsourced sales team for BT, providing sales management and execution in the B2B marketplace across 9% of the UK.
