= List of companies named after people =

This is a list of companies named after people. For other lists of eponyms (names derived from people) see Lists of etymologies. All of these are named after founders, co-founders and partners of companies, unless otherwise stated.

== A ==
- A&G Price - Alfred and George Price
- A&M Records – Herb Alpert and Jerry Moss
- A&W Restaurants – Roy Allen and Frank Wright
- Abarth - Carlo Abarth
- Abbott Laboratories – Wallace Calvin Abbott (1888)
- Abercrombie & Fitch – David T. Abercrombie and Ezra Fitch
- Abrams Air Craft – Talbert Abrams
- Abt Sportsline – Johann Abt
- Adani Group - Gautam Adani
- Adidas – Adolf "Adi" Dassler
- Aditya Birla Group – Ghanshyam Das Birla
- AE Goodwin - Arthur Elliott Goodwin
- AG Edwards – Albert Gallatin Edwards
- AG Healing - Alf Healing
- Agusta – Giovanni Agusta
- AGV – Gino Amisano (Amisano Gino Valenza)
- Åhléns - Johan Petter Åhlén
- Air Jordan – Michael Jordan
- Aitken Spence – Patrick Gordon Spence, Edward Aitken and S.R. Aitken
- Ajo Motorsport – Aki Ajo
- ALAN – Alberto and Annamaria, children of founder Falconi Lodovico
- Albert Heijn and Ahold (Albert Heijn Holdings) – Albert Heijn
- Albertsons – Joe Albertson
- Aldi – Theo and Karl Albrecht
- Alessi – Giovanni Alessi
- Alex von Falkenhausen Motorenbau – Alex von Falkenhausen
- Alexander McQueen - Alexander McQueen
- Alfa Romeo - Nicola Romeo
- Allan Moffat Racing - Allan Moffat
- Allard Motor Company - Sydney Allard
- Allen & Unwin - George Allen and Stanley Unwin
- Alltech — Aoife Louise Lyons, daughter of company founder Pearse Lyons
- Alza – Alex Zaffaroni
- AM Best - Alfred Magilton Best
- Amdahl Corporation – Gene Amdahl
- AMG – Hans Werner Aufrecht and Erhard Melcher
- Amstrad – Alan Sugar (Alan Michael Sugar Trading)
- Anatra – Artur Antonovich Anatra
- Andrea Moda Formula – Andrea Sassetti
- Andrew Barclay Sons & Company - Andrew Barclay
- Andy Rouse Engineering - Andy Rouse
- Angi – Angie Hicks
- Anheuser-Busch – Lilly and Eberhard Anheuser, and Adolphus Busch
- Ann Summers – Annice Summers, secretary of founder Michael Caborn-Waterfield
- Ansaldo – Giovanni Ansaldo
- Anschutz Corporation – Philip Anschutz
- Ansett Australia, Ansett Pioneer, Ansett Transport Industries – Reg Ansett
- Antonov – Oleg Antonov
- Arai Helmet – Hirotake Arai
- Archer Daniels Midland – George Archer and John Daniels
- Armani – Giorgio Armani
- Armstrong Whitworth - William Armstrong
- Arnold Clark Automobiles - Arnold Clark
- Arrows – Franco Ambrosio, Alan Rees, Jackie Oliver, Dave Wass and Tony Southgate
- Arup Group - Ove Arup
- Arzani-Volpini – Egidio Arzani and Gianpaolo Volpini
- AS Watson – Alexander Skirving Watson
- Ascari Cars - Alberto Ascari
- Ashurst - William Ashurst
- Astley Baker Davies - Neville Astley, Mark Baker and Phil Davies
- Aston Butterworth – Bill Aston and Archie Butterworth
- Aston Martin – Lionel Martin
- Audemars Piguet - Jules Louis Audemars and Edward Auguste Piguet
- Audi – August Horch
- Austin Motor Company – Herbert Austin
- Aveling & Porter - Thomas Aveling and Richard Porter
- Avery Dennison – R Stanton Avery
- AviaBellanca Aircraft – Giuseppe Bellanca
- Avis Car Rental - Warren Avis
- AW Edwards - Austin William Edwards

== B ==
- B&H Photo Video – Blimie and Herman Schreiber
- B&Q – Richard Block and David Quayle
- Babolat – Pierre Babolat (1842–1892)
- Bacardi – Facundo Bacardi
- Baedeker – Karl Baedeker
- Bain & Company and Bain Capital - Bill Bain
- Bajaj Auto – Jamnalal Bajaj
- Baker Curb Racing – Gary Baker and Mike Curb
- Baker Hughes – Reuben Baker
- Baker McKenzie - Russell Baker and John McKenzie
- BakerBus - James Baker
- Bakers Dolphin - Charles Baker
- Baldwin Locomotive Works – Matthias Baldwin
- Balenciaga – Cristóbal Balenciaga
- Ball Corporation – the Ball Brothers
- Ballet Rambert – Marie Rambert
- Balmain - Pierre Balmain
- Bandini Automobili – Ilario Bandini
- Bang & Olufsen – Peter Bang and Svend Olufsen
- Bankable Productions – Tyra Banks
- Bannatyne – Duncan Bannatyne
- Banta Corporation – George Banta
- Barbour – John Barbour
- Barclays – James Barclay
- Barilla Group – Pietro Barilla
- Barings Bank – Francis Baring and John Baring
- Barnardo's – Thomas John Barnardo
- Barnes & Noble – William Barnes and Clifford Noble
- Barneys New York – Barney Pressman
- Bashas' – Eddie Basha
- Baskin Robbins – Burt Baskin and Irvine Robbins
- Bass Brewery – William Bass
- Bauknecht – Gottlob Bauknecht
- Bausch & Lomb – John Bausch and Henry Lomb
- Baxter's Coaches - Roy Baxter
- Bayat Power - Ehsan Bayat
- Bayer – Friedrich Bayer
- BBDO - George Batten, Bruce Barton, Roy Durstine and Alex Osborn
- BEA Systems – Bill Coleman, Ed Scott and Alfred Chuang
- Bechtel – Warren Bechtel
- Beckman Coulter – Arnold Beckman
- Beck's – Heinrich Beck
- Beecham Group – Thomas Beecham
- Behra – Jean Behra
- Beiersdorf – Paul Beiersdorf
- Belk – William Belk
- Bell Aircraft – Lawrence Bell
- Bell Telephone Company, Bell System – Alexander Graham Bell
- Bellasi – Guglielmo Bellasi
- Ben & Jerry's – Ben Cohen and Jerry Greenfield
- Benbros – Jack and Nathan Beneson
- Benelli – Teresa Benelli
- Benetton Group – Luciano Benetton
- Benson & Hedges - Richard Benson and William Hedges
- Bentalls – Frank Bentall
- Bentley – Walter Owen Bentley
- Beretta – Bartolomeo Beretta
- Beriev – Georgy Beriev
- Berrys Coaches - Clifford Berry
- Bertelsmann – Carl Bertelsmann
- Berluti – Alessandro Berluti
- Bertone – Giovanni Bertone
- Beyer, Peacock & Company - Charles Beyer and Richard Peacock
- Bialetti – Alfonso Bialetti
- Bianchi – Edoardo Bianchi
- Bic – Marcel Bich
- Bickerton – Harry Bickerton
- Bimota – Valerio Bianchi, Giuseppe Morri, and Massimo Tamburini
- Bing Lee – Bing Lee
- Bird's Custard – Alfred Bird
- Birds Eye – Clarence Birdseye
- Bitter Automotive - Erich Bitter
- Bizzarrini - Giotto Bizzarrini
- Black+Decker – S. Duncan Black and Alonzo Decker
- Blanchard Racing Team - Tim Blanchard
- Blohm+Voss – Hermann Blohm and Ernst Voss
- Bloomberg LP – Michael Bloomberg
- Bloomingdale's – Joseph and Lyman Bloomingdale
- Blumhouse Productions – Jason Blum
- Boardman Bikes – Chris Boardman
- Bob Bondurant School of High Performance Driving – Bob Bondurant
- Bob Forbes Racing - Bob Forbes
- Bocar – Bob Carnes
- Boddingtons – Henry Boddington
- Bodley Head – Thomas Bodley
- Boehringer Ingelheim – Albert Boehringer
- Boeing – William Boeing
- Bölkow – Ludwig Bölkow
- Boltons - Isaac Bolton
- Bombardier – Joseph Bombardier
- Bomgar – Joel Bomgaars
- Bond Corporation - Alan Bond
- Bonhams – Walter Bonham
- Bonnier Group – Gerhard Bonnier
- Borgward - Carl F. W. Borgward
- Booth's Gin – John Booth
- Boots – John Boot
- Borders – Tom and Louis Borders
- Boro – Bob and Rody Hoogenboom
- Bosch – Robert Bosch
- Bose Corporation – Amar Bose
- Bovis - Charles Bovis
- Bowden's Bus Service - Joe Bowden
- Bowers Coaches - Eric Bower
- Bowman's Bus Services - Davis Bowman
- Brabham – Jack Brabham
- Brabham Automotive - David Brabham
- Brabus – Klaus Brackmann and Bodo Buschmann
- Brad Jones Racing – Brad Jones
- Brains Brewery – Samuel Brain
- Brambles - Walter Bramble
- Brashs - Michael Brasch
- Braun – Max Braun
- Brawn GP – Ross Brawn
- Brentano's – August Brentano
- Brewco Motorsports – Clarence and Tammy Brewer
- Bricklin - Malcolm Bricklin
- Briggs & Stratton – Stephen Foster Briggs and Harold Meade Stratton
- Britek Motorsport – Jason Bright
- Brooke Bond – Arthur Brooke
- Brooks Brothers - Henry Sands Brooks
- Brooks Locomotive Works – Horatio Brooks
- Brun Motorsport – Walter Brun
- Brunello Cucinelli - Brunello Cucinelli
- Bryant & May – William Bryant and Francis May
- Bugatti – Ettore Bugatti
- Buick – David Buick
- Buitoni – Giovanni Buitoni
- Bullocks Coaches - Ralph Bullock
- Bulova – Joseph Bulova
- Bunnings - Arthur and Robert Bunning
- Burberry – Thomas Burberry
- Burns Philp - James Burns and Robert Philp
- Butler Air Transport - Cecil Arthur Butler
- Butler International - Paul Butler
- BVD – Messrs Bradley, Voorhees and Day

== C ==
- C&A – Clemens and August Brenninkmeijer
- Cabela's – Dick Cabela
- Cadbury – John Cadbury
- Cadillac – Antoine Laumet de La Mothe, sieur de Cadillac
- Callaway Cars – Reeves Callaway
- Callaway Golf Company – Ely Callaway
- Calvin Klein – Calvin Klein
- Cammell Laird – Charles Cammell and William Laird
- Campagnolo – Tullio Campagnolo
- Campari – Davide Campari
- Campbell's – Joseph A. Campbell
- Captain Cook Cruises - James Cook
- Cargill – William Wallace Cargill
- Carhartt - Hamilton Carhartt
- Carluccio's - Antonio Carluccio
- Carlyle Group – Thomas Carlyle
- Cartier - Louis-François Cartier
- Casio – Tadao Kashio
- Cassell – John Cassell
- Celine – Celine Vipiana
- Cerruti 1881 – Nino Cerruti
- CH Robinson – Charles Henry Robinson
- Chanel – Coco Chanel
- Charles Schwab Corporation – Charles Robert Schwab
- Chase Bank - Salmon Chase
- Chestertons - Charles Chesterton
- Chevrolet – Louis Chevrolet
- Chip Ganassi Racing – Chip Ganassi
- Chris Amon Racing – Chris Amon
- Christian Salvesen – Christian Salvesen
- Christie's – James Christie
- Chrysler – Walter Chrysler
- Citroën – André Citroën
- Cizeta – Claudio Zampolli
- CKE Restaurants – founded as Carl Karcher Enterprises
- Clarks – Cyrus and James Clark
- Clarks Logan City Bus Service - Reg Clark
- Claud Butler – Claud Butler
- Clif Bar – Clifford Erickson
- Clough Group - John Clough
- Cluttons - William Clutton
- Cobb & Co - Freeman Cobb
- Coffey International - David Coffey
- Cokin – Jean Coquin
- Coles – George Coles
- Colgate-Palmolive – William Colgate
- Colin Bond Racing – Colin Bond
- Collins Radio Company – Arthur A. Collins
- Colnago – Ernesto Colnago
- Coloni – Enzo Coloni
- Colt's Manufacturing Company, Colt Defense, Colt Canada – Samuel Colt
- Condé Nast – Condé Montrose Nast
- Connolly Leather – John Connolly
- Converse - Marquis Mills Converse
- Cooper Car Company – Charles and John Cooper
- Coopers Brewery - Thomas Cooper
- Coors Brewing Company, Adolph Coors Company – Adolph Coors
- Cord Automobile – Errett Lobban Cord
- Corel – Michael Cowpland (Cowpland Research Laboratory)
- Costa Coffee – Bruno Costa and Sergio Costa
- Cosworth – Mike Costin and Keith Duckworth
- Courage Compétition – Yves Courage
- Cox Architecture - Philip Cox
- Cox Enterprises – James Middleton Cox
- Cox Models – Roy Cox
- Craigslist - Craig Newmark
- Crane Currency – Stephen Crane or the Crane family
- Cray – Seymour Cray
- Crosville Motor Services - George Crosland Taylor and Georges de Ville
- Crumpler – Stuart Crumpler
- Cummins – Clessie Cummins
- Cunard - Samuel Cunard
- Currys - Henry Curry
- Curtiss Aeroplane & Motor Company – Glenn Curtiss
- Cushman & Wakefield – J Clydesdale Cushman and Bernard Wakefield

== D ==
- DAF - Hub van Doorne
- D&G Bus - David Reeves and Gerald Henderson
- Daimler Company - Gottlieb Daimler
- Daimler-Benz – Gottlieb Daimler and Carl Benz
- Dallara – Giampaolo Dallara
- Damiani – Enrico Grassi Damiani
- Danelectro – Nathan Daniel
- Dangote Group – Aliko Dangote
- Danjaq – Dana Broccoli and Jacqueline Saltzman, wives of company founders Albert Broccoli and Harry Saltzman
- Danone – nickname of Daniel, son of Isaac Carasso
- Dargaud – Georges Dargaud
- Dassault Group – Marcel Dassault
- Datsun – Kenjiro Den, Rokuro Aoyama and Meitaro Takeuchi
- Dauer Sportwagen – Jochen Dauer
- David Jones (department store) – David Jones
- David Lloyd Leisure – David Lloyd
- David Price Racing – David Price
- Davidoff - Zino Davidoff
- Davis Polk - John W. Davis, a defender of racial segregation and state control of education.
- DBZ Guitars – Dean B. Zelinsky
- De Agostini – Giovanni De Agostini
- De Tomaso – Alejandro de Tomaso
- Dean & DeLuca – Joel Dean and Giorgio DeLuca
- Dean Guitars – Dean Zelinsky
- Deanes Coaches - Ron Deane
- Debenhams – William Debenham
- De Bortoli Wines, Darren De Bortoli
- Dell – Michael Dell
- Deloitte – William Welch Deloitte
- DeLorean Motor Company – John DeLorean
- Denning - Alan B Denning
- DHL – Adrian Dalsey, Larry Hillblom, and Robert Lynn
- Dick Clark Productions – Dick Clark
- Dick Johnson Racing – Dick Johnson
- Dick Smith – Dick Smith
- Dick's Sporting Goods – Dick Stack
- Dillard's – William T. Dillard
- Dineen Group - Bill Dineen
- Dion's Bus Service - Thomas Dion
- Dior – Christian Dior
- Disney – Walt Disney
- Driscoll's – Dick Driscoll
- Dodge – John and Horace Dodge
- Dolby Laboratories – Ray Dolby
- Dolce & Gabbana – Domenico Dolce and Stefano Gabbana
- Dollond & Aitchison – John and Peter Dollond and James Aitchison
- Don Bluth Entertainment – Don Bluth
- Donric Group - Don McKenzie and Richard Baird
- Double R Racing, formerly Räikkönen Robertson Racing – Kimi Räikkönen and Steve Robertson
- Douglas Aircraft Company – Donald Wills Douglas
- Dow Chemical Company – Herbert Dow
- Dow Jones & Company – Charles Dow and Edward Jones
- Downer Group - Arnold Downer
- D'Oyly Carte Opera Company – Richard D'Oyly Carte
- Dr. Bronner's Magic Soaps – Emanuel Bronner
- Dr. Martens - Klaus Märtens
- Dr. Oetker – August Oetker
- Driver Group - Eric and Reg Driver
- Dübs & Company - Henry Dübs
- Ducati – Antonio Cavalieri Ducati (1853–1927)
- Duesenberg – Fred and August Duesenberg
- Duke Energy – James Buchanan Duke
- DuMont Television Network & DuMont Laboratories – Allen B. DuMont
- Dunhill (luxury goods) and Dunhill (cigars) - Alfred Dunhill
- Dunnhumby - Edwina Dunn and Clive Humby
- Dunlop – John Boyd Dunlop
- Dunlop Manufacturing – Jim Dunlop
- Dun & Bradstreet - Robert Dun and John Bradstreet
- DuPont – Eleuthère Irénée du Pont
- Dürr Group – Paul Dürr
- Dyson – James Dyson
- Dysons - Laurie Dyson

== E ==
- Eastman Kodak – George Eastman
- Easton – Doug Easton
- Eaton's – Timothy Eaton
- Eddie Bauer – Eddie Bauer
- Edelbrock – Vic Edelbrock
- Edison Records – Thomas Edison
- Edsel - Edsel Ford
- Eggenberger Motorsport, Rudi Eggenberger
- Eileen Fisher - Eileen Fisher
- Elders - Alexander Lang Elder
- Eli Lilly & Company – Eli Lilly
- Ellis Briggs – Leonard Ellis and Thomas Briggs
- Ericsson – Lars Magnus Ericsson
- Ermenegildo Zegna – Ermenegildo Zegna
- Ernest Hillier Chocolates - Ernest Hillier
- Estée Lauder Companies – Estée Lauder
- EuroBrun – Walter Brun
- Evans Deakin & Company - Daniel Evans and Arthur Deakin
- EY - Alwin Ernst and Arthur Young

== F ==
- Fabbri Group – Romolo Fabbri
- Faber & Faber – Geoffrey Faber
- Faber-Castell – Kaspar Faber
- Falabella – Salvatore Falabella
- Fazer – Karl Fazer
- FB Mondial – Fratelli Boselli
- Felt Bicycles – Jim Felt
- Fender – Leo Fender
- Fendi – Edoardo Fendi
- Fenty Beauty - Rihanna
- Ferguson Research – Harry Ferguson
- Ferragamo – Salvatore Ferragamo
- Ferranti – Sebastian Ziani de Ferranti
- Ferrari – Enzo Ferrari
- Ferrero – Pietro Ferrero
- Ferretti Group – Alessandro and Norberto Ferretti
- Fielmann – Günther Fielmann
- Filippi Boats – Filippi Lido
- Fioravanti – Leonardo Fioravanti
- Firestone – Harvey S. Firestone
- Fisher-Price – Herman Fisher and Irving Price
- Fisker Automotive and Fisker Inc. - Henrik Fisker
- Fitch Ratings – John Knowles Fitch
- Fittipaldi Automotive – Emerson and Wilson Fittipaldi
- FitzGerald's - George Fitzgerald
- Flemings - Jim Fleming
- Fluor Corporation - John Fluor
- Focke-Wulf – Henrich Focke and Georg Wulf
- Fokker – Anthony Fokker
- Foley's Bus Service - John Foley
- Forbes – Bertie Forbes
- Ford Motor Company – Henry Ford
- Forti – Guido Forti
- Fortinos – John Fortino
- Fortnum & Mason – William Fortnum and Hugh Mason
- Foster + Partners - Norman Foster
- Foster's Group - William and Ralph Foster
- Fox Broadcasting Company - William Fox
- Fox Racing – Geoff Fox
- Fox Racing Shox – Bob Fox
- Franck Muller – Franck Muller
- Frank Williams Racing Cars – Frank Williams
- Franklin Mint – believed to be named in honor of Benjamin Franklin
- FranklinCovey – Benjamin Franklin and Stephen Covey
- Franklins - Frank Lindstrom
- Frazer Nash – Archibald Frazer-Nash
- Fred Flare – Fred Astaire
- Fred Perry - Fred Perry
- Freisinger Motorsport – Manfred Freisinger
- Fresenius – Eduard Fresenius
- Frost French – Sadie Frost and Jemima French
- Frost & Sullivan – Lore Frost and Dan Sullivan
- Fuller, Smith & Turner – John Fuller, Henry Smith and John Turner
- Fulton Hogan - Julius Fulton and Robert Hogan

== G ==
- Galen Institute – health care think tank named after Galen, a prominent Greek physician
- Galles Racing – Rick Galles
- Galmer – Rick Galles and Alan Mertens
- Gannett Company – Frank Gannett
- Garmin – Gary Burrell and Min Kao
- Gartner – Gideon Gartner
- Garry Rogers Motorsport – Garry Rogers
- Georgiou Group - Peter Georgiou
- Gemballa – Uwe Gemballa
- George Dickel – George A. Dickel
- Gerber Products Company – Daniel Frank Gerber
- Getty Images – Mark Getty
- Getty Oil – John Paul Getty
- Ghirardelli Chocolate Company – Domingo Ghirardelli
- Giannini – Tranquillo Giannini
- Gibson Guitar Corporation – Orville Gibson
- Gibson Motorsport – Fred Gibson
- Gibson's of Moffat - James Gibson
- Gilbarco Veeder-Root – Charles Gilbert and John Barker
- Gilbern - Giles Smith and Bernard Friese
- Gilera – Giuseppe Gilera
- Gillet – Tony Gillet
- Gillette – King Gillette
- Girard-Perregaux – Constant Girard and Marie Perregaux
- Gitzo – Arsène Gitzhoven
- Givenchy – Hubert de Givenchy
- GKN - John Guest, Arthur Keen and Joseph Nettlefold
- Glenn L. Martin Company – Glenn Luther Martin
- Glenn Seton Racing – Glenn Seton
- Glock Ges.m.b.H. – Gaston Glock
- GN – H.R. Godfrey and Archibald Frazer Nash
- Godin – Robert Godin
- Godrej Group – Ardeshir Godrej and Pirojsha Burjorji Godrej
- Godfreys - Godfrey Cohen
- Goldman Sachs – Marcus Goldman and Samuel Sachs
- Goldwyn Pictures – Samuel Goldwyn
- Goninan - Alfred and Ralph Goninan
- Goodman Group - Gregory Goodman
- Goodrich Corporation – Benjamin Goodrich
- Goodyear Tire & Rubber Company – Charles Goodyear
- Gordon Murray Automotive - Gordon Murray
- Gordon-Keeble - John Gordon and Jim Keeble
- Gordon's Gin – Alexander Gordon
- Gore & Associates - Bill and Vieve Gore
- Gorman – Lisa Gorman
- Gottlieb – David Gottlieb
- Grace – William Grace
- Grace Bros - Albert and Joseph Grace
- Graham's Bus Service - Andrew Graham
- Grenda's Bus Services - George Grenda
- Greggs – John Gregg
- Gresini Racing – Fausto Gresini
- Grès - Madame Grès
- Gretsch – Friedrich Gretsch
- Grove Racing - Stephen Grove
- Grundig – Max Grundig
- GT Bicycles – Gary Turner
- Gucci – Guccio Gucci
- Guerlain - Pierre-François Pascal Guerlain
- Guillows – Paul Guillow
- Guinness – Arthur Guinness
- Gumpert – Roland Gumpert
- Guthy Renker – Bill Guthy and Greg Renker
- Guzzi – Carlo Guzzi

== H ==
- H. Samuel - Harriet Samuel
- H-E-B – Howard Edward Butt
- H&R Block – Henry and Richard Bloch
- Haas Automation – Gene Haas
- Haas Lola – Carl Haas
- Haas Outdoors – Toxey Haas
- Hachette Filipacchi Médias – Louis Hachette and Daniel Filipacchi
- Haigh's Chocolates - Alfred Haigh
- Halliburton – Erle Halliburton
- Halls, Hallmark Cards – Joyce Hall
- Hamann Motorsport – Richard Hamann
- Hamish Hamilton – Jamie Hamilton
- Hamleys – William Hamley
- Hämmerli – Johann Hämmerli
- Hancock Prospecting - Lang Hancock
- Hanna-Barbera – William Hanna and Joseph Barbera
- Haribo – Hans Riegel
- Harland & Wolff - Edward Harland and Gustav Wolff
- Harley-Davidson – William S. Harley and Arthur Davidson
- Harman Kardon – Sidney Harman and Bernard Kardon
- Haro Bikes – Bob Haro
- HarperCollins – James Harper and William Collins
- Harpo Productions - Oprah Winfrey
- Harrah's Entertainment – William Harrah
- Harris Bus - Frank Harris
- Harris Scarfe - George Peter Harris and George Scarfe
- Harrods – Charles Henry Harrod
- Hart Racing Engines – Brian Hart
- Harvey Nichols – Benjamin Harvey and James Nichols
- Harvey Norman – Gerry Harvey and Ian Norman
- Hasbro – Henry, Hillel and Herman Hasselfeld (the Hassenfeld Brothers)
- Hasegawa Corporation – Suguro Hasegawa
- Hasselblad – Victor Hasselblad
- Hatchards – John Hatchard
- Hays Travel - John Hays
- Heal's – John Harris Heal
- Hearst Corporation – William Randolph Hearst
- Heckler & Koch – Edmund Heckler and Theodor Koch
- Heineken International – Gerard Adriaan Heineken
- Heinemann – William Heinemann
- Heinz – Henry Heinz
- Hendrick Motorsports – Rick Hendrick
- Henkel – Friedrich Karl Henkel
- Hennessey Performance – John Hennessey
- Hennessy – Richard Hennessy
- Herb Chambers Companies - Herb Chambers
- Hermès - Thierry Hermès
- Herpa – Wilhelm Hergenröther (Hergenröther und Patente)
- Hershey Company – Milton Hershey
- Hesburger – Heikki Salmela
- Hesketh Racing, Hesketh Motorcycles – Alexander Hesketh
- Hewitt Associates – Ted Hewitt
- Hewlett-Packard – William Hewlett and David Packard
- Hillman – William Hillman
- Hilton Hotels & Resorts – Conrad Hilton
- HK Porter – Henry Kirke Porter
- HKS – Hiroyuki Hasegawa and Goichi Kitagawa (plus Sigma Automotive)
- Hodder & Stoughton – Matthew Hodder and Thomas Stoughton
- Hohner – Matthias Hohner
- Holden - James Alexander Holden
- Holland & Barrett – William Holland and Alfred Slapps Barrett
- Holman Moody – John Holman and Ralph Moody
- Honda – Soichiro Honda
- Honeywell – Mark Honeywell
- Hoover Company - William Henry Hoover
- Hopkinsons - Graham Hopkinson
- Horch - August Horch
- Horlicks – James Horlick and William Horlick
- Hormel – George Hormel
- Hornby Railways – Frank Hornby
- Hornibrook - Manuel Hornibrook
- Hoshino Impul – Kazuyoshi Hoshino
- House of Fabergé – Gustav Fabergé
- House of Fraser - Hugh Fraser
- Hovnanian Enterprises – Kevork Hovnanian
- Howard Smith - William Howard Smith
- Hoyt Archery – Earl Hoyt
- HR Owen - Harold Owen
- Hughes Aircraft, Hughes Tool Company, Hughes Airwest – Howard Hughes
- Hugo Boss – Hugo Boss
- Hulleys of Baslow - Henry Hulley
- Humber – Thomas Humber
- Hungry Jack's - Jack Cowin
- Huntley & Palmers – Joseph Huntley and George Palmer
- Hutchison Whampoa – John Hutchison
- Hy-Vee – Charles Hyde and David Vredenburg

== I ==
- Icahn Enterprises – Carl Icahn
- IKEA - Ingvar Kamprad
- illy – Andrea Illy
- Ilmor – Mario Illien and Paul Morgan
- Ilyushin – Sergey Ilyushin
- Ind Coope – Edward Ind and Octavius Coope
- Ingersoll Rand - Simon Ingersoll, Addison and Jasper Rand
- Ingle & Rhode – Tim Ingle and David Rhode
- Innocenti – Ferdinando Innocenti
- Irmscher – Günther Irmscher
- Islabikes – Isla Rowntree
- Italdesign Giugiaro – Giorgetto Giugiaro

== J ==
- J Walter Thompson - James Walter Thompson
- Jack Barclay Bentley - Jack Bentley
- Jack Daniel's – Jack Daniel
- Jack Link's Beef Jerky – Jack Link
- Jack's - Jack Cohen
- Jackson Guitars – Grover Jackson
- Jacksons of Piccadilly – Robert Jackson
- Jacob's – William and Robert Jacob
- Jacuzzi – the Jacuzzi brothers
- Jafco – Sidney Jaffe
- James Hardie - James Hardie
- James Martin & Company - James Martin
- James Purdey & Sons – James Purdey
- JB Young's - James Young
- JBL – James Bullough Lansing
- JCB – Joseph Cyril Bamford
- JCDecaux - Jean-Claude Decaux
- JCPenney – James Cash Penney
- JD Sports - John Wardle and David Makin
- Jean Coutu Group – Jean Coutu
- Jensen Motors - Richard and Alan Jensen
- Jil Sander – Jil Sander
- Jim Henson Company – Jim Henson
- Jim Stones Coaches - Jim Stones
- Jimmy Choo - Jimmy Choo
- Jimmy John's – Jimmy John Liautaud
- J. J. Newberry – John Josiah Newberry
- JML – John Mills
- Jo-Han – John Hanley
- Joe Gibbs Racing – Joe Gibbs
- Joest Racing – Reinhold Joest
- John Briggs Motorsport - John Briggs
- John Cooper Works – John Cooper
- John Deere – John Deere
- John Fairfax & Sons - John Fairfax
- John Faulkner Racing - John Faulkner
- John Fishwick & Sons - John Fishwick
- John Holland Group - John Holland
- John Lewis - John Spedan Lewis
- John Martin's - John Martin
- John Murray – John Murray
- John Player & Sons – John Player
- John Smith's Brewery – John Smith
- Johnnie Walker – John Walker
- Johnson & Johnson – Robert, James and Edward Johnson
- Johnson Publishing Company – John H. Johnson
- Johnsons Coach & Bus Travel - Jack and Blanch Johnson
- Jones Lang Wootton – last names of its three principal members
- Jordan Grand Prix – Eddie Jordan
- Joseph Schmidt Confections - Joseph Schmidt
- Jowett Cars - William and Benjamin Jowett
- JP Morgan & Co – John Pierpont Morgan
- JPT Bus Company - Janet and Peter Walsh
- JTG Daugherty Racing – Jodi and Tad Geschickter, and Brad Daugherty
- Judd – John Judd
- Junkers – Hugo Junkers
- JW Bolton - John Bolton

== K ==
- Kadokawa Shoten – Haruki Kadokawa
- Kaiser Aluminum, Kaiser Motors, Kaiser Permanente, Kaiser Shipyards, Kaiser Steel – Henry J. Kaiser
- Kaiser-Frazer – Henry and Joseph Frazer
- Kaman Corporation – Charles Kaman
- Kärcher – Alfred Kärcher
- Karstadt – Rudolph Karstadt
- Kaspersky Lab – Eugene Kaspersky
- Kate Spade New York – Kate Spade
- Kawasaki Heavy Industries – Kawasaki Shōzō
- Keen - Martin Keen
- Kell & Rigby - William Kell and Alexander Rigby
- Kellogg Company, WK Kellogg Co – Will Keith Kellogg
- Kelly Racing – John and Margaret Kelly
- The Kennedy/Marshall Company – Kathleen Kennedy and Frank Marshall
- Kenwood – Ken Wood
- Kennards Hire - Walter Kennard
- Kenzo - Kenzō Takada
- Kevin Harvick Incorporated – Kevin Harvick
- Kimberly-Clark – John Kimberly and Charles Clark
- Kinchbus - Gilbert Kinch
- King Kullen – Michael J. Cullen; he replaced the "C" with a "K" for marketing purposes
- Kitson & Company - James Kitson
- KKR – Jerome Kohlberg Jr., Henry Kravis and George R. Roberts
- Knight Ridder – John S. Knight and Herman Ridder
- Knorr – Carl Heinrich Theodor Knorr
- Koch, Inc. – Fred C. Koch
- Koch Media – Franz Koch
- Koei – Kō Shibusawa and Eiji Fukuzawa (non-existent people)
- Koenigsegg – Christian von Koenigsegg
- Kogan.com – Ruslan Kogan
- Kohl's – Max Kohl
- Kojima Engineering – Matsuhisa Kojima
- Kojima Productions – Hideo Kojima
- Konami – Kagemasa Kouzuki, Yoshinobu Nakama, Tatuso Miyasako (another theory was Hiro Matsuda, and Shokichi Ishihara)
- Konrad Motorsport – Franz Konrad
- KordaMentha - Mark Korda and Mark Mentha
- Kraft Foods – James Lewis Kraft
- Kremer Racing – Erwin and Manfred Kremer
- Kroger – Bernard Kroger
- Kruse International – Russell Kruse
- Kurtis Kraft – Frank Kurtis
- Kuzma – Eddie Kuzma
- Kwanon – Kannon (Japanese for the Buddhist bodhisattva Guan Yin)

== L ==
- L.L.Bean – Leon Leonwood Bean
- Lacoste – René Lacoste
- Lafarge – Joseph-Auguste Pavin de Lafarge
- Lagardère Group – Jean-Luc Lagardère
- Laidlaw – Robert Laidlaw
- Lalique - René Lalique
- Lamborghini – Ferruccio Lamborghini
- Lancia – Vicenzo Lancia
- Lane Bryant – Lena Bryant (first name misspelled by a bank officer when she opened her company's first bank account)
- Larkham Motorsport - Mark Larkham
- Larousse – Pierre Larousse
- Larrousse – Gérard Larrousse
- Lauda Air – Niki Lauda
- Lavazza – Luigi Lavazza
- Laverda – Pietro Laverda
- Lay's – Herman Lay
- Lazard – Alexandre, Simon and Elie Lazard
- LDS – Louis Douglas Serrurier
- Leatherman – Timothy Leatherman
- Lee Enterprises – A. W. Lee
- Lee – Harry David Lee
- Leeann Chin – Leeann Chin
- Lehman Brothers – Henry, Emanuel and Meyer Lehman
- J. Lehrenkrauss Corporation
- Leighton Holdings - Stanley Leighton
- Leica Camera, Leica Geosystems and Leica Microsystems – Ernst Leitz
- Leitz – Louis Leitz
- LeMond Racing Cycles – Greg LeMond
- Leslie – Donald Leslie
- Lesney Products – Leslie Smith and Rodney Smith
- Levi Strauss & Co – Levi Strauss
- Li-Ning – Li Ning
- Liberty – Arthur Lasenby Liberty
- Lidl – named for Ludwig Lidl
- Life – Ernesto Vita (surname is Italian for life)
- Ligier – Guy Ligier
- Lincoln Motor Company – Abraham Lincoln
- Lincoln National Corporation – to convey the integrity of U.S. president Abraham Lincoln
- Linde Group – Carl von Linde
- Lindt – Rodolphe Lindt
- Linfox - Lindsay Fox
- Lipton – Thomas Lipton
- Lisa Frank Incorporated – Lisa Frank
- Livingston International – Gerry Livingston
- Liz Claiborne – Liz Claiborne
- LJ Hooker - Leslie Joseph Hooker
- Lloyds Bank – Sampson Lloyd
- Lloyds Coaches - Win Lloyd
- Lloyd's of London – Edward Lloyd
- Loblaws – Theodore Loblaw
- Lockheed Martin – Allan Lockheed and Malcolm Loughead
- Loews Cineplex Entertainment and Loews Corporation – Marcus Loew
- Loganair - Willie Logan
- Longhurst Racing - Tony Longhurst
- Longman – Thomas Longman
- Lonsdale – Hugh Cecil Lowther, 5th Earl of Lonsdale
- Lorillard Tobacco Company – Pierre Abraham Lorillard
- Loro Piana - Pietro Loro Piana
- Lotte – The Sorrows of Young Werther character Charlotte
- Loud Brothers – Thomas, Philologus, John and Joseph Loud
- Louis B. Mayer Pictures – Louis B. Mayer
- Louis Vuitton – Louis Vuitton
- Lowe's – Lucius Lowe
- Lowe Alpine – Greg, Jeff and Mike Lowe
- Lucasfilm – George Lucas
- Lucivelle - Lucivelle

== M ==
- Macmahon Holdings - Brian Macmahon
- Macmillan – Daniel and Alexander Macmillan
- MacRobertson Miller Airlines - Macpherson Robertson and Horrie Miller
- Macy's – Rowland Hussey Macy
- Maggi – Julius Maggi
- Mahindra Group – Kailash Chandra Mahindra and Jagdish Chandra Mahindra
- Maki – Mimur A Kenji
- Makita – Mosaburo Makita
- Malaguti – Antonio Malaguti
- Mamiya – Seichi Mamiya
- Manfrotto Group – Lino Manfrotto
- Manion's – Ron Manion
- Mansory – Kourosh Mansory
- March Engineering – initials of Max Mosley, Alan Rees, Graham Coaker and Robin Herd
- Marchese – Carl Marchese
- Marcos Engineering - Jem Marsh and Frank Costin
- Mark Foy's - Francis and Mark Foy
- Marconi Company – Guglielmo Marconi
- Marcus Marshall Motorsport – Marcus Marshall
- Mark Levinson – Mark Levinson
- Marks & Spencer – Michael Marks and Thomas Spencer
- Marriott Corporation – John Willard Marriott
- Mars – Frank Mars
- Marsh McLennan – Henry Wheelwright Marsh and Donald McLennan
- Marshall Amplification – Jim Marshall
- Martha Stewart Living Omnimedia – Martha Stewart
- Martin-Baker – James Martin and Valentine Baker
- Martini – Tico Martini
- Martini & Rossi – Alessandro Martini and Luigi Rossi
- Martyrs Bus Service - Harry Martyr
- Mary Kay, Inc. – Mary Kay Ash
- Marzotto – Luigi Marzotto
- Maserati - Alfieri Maserati
- Matsushita Electric Industrial – Konosuke Matsushita
- Matrox – Branko Matić and Lorne Trottier
- Mattel – Harold Matt Matson and Elliot Handler
- Mauser – Wilhelm and Paul Mauser
- Max Factor – Max Factor, Sr
- Maybach – Wilhelm and Karl Maybach
- Mayne Coaches - Arthur Mayne
- Maytag – Frederick Louis Maytag I
- Mayne Nickless - John Mayne and Enoch Nickless
- Mazda – Jujiro Matsuda, also possibly inspired by the Zoroastrian god Ahura Mazda
- MB – Milton Bradley
- McAfee – John McAfee
- McCafferty's - Jack McCafferty
- McCaw Cellular Communications – Craig McCaw
- McDonald's – Richard and Maurice McDonald
- McDonnell Aircraft Corporation – James Smith McDonnell
- McFarlane Toys – Todd McFarlane
- McGraw-Hill – John A. Hill and James H. McGraw
- McHarry's Buslines - John McHarry
- McIlwraith, McEacharn & Company - Andrew McIlwraith and Malcolm McEacharn
- McKenzie's Tourist Services - Lorry McKenzie
- McKesson Corporation – John McKesson
- McKindless - Vincent McKindless
- McKinsey & Company - James O. McKinsey
- McLaren – Bruce McLaren
- McMahon Services - Glen McMahon
- McVicar's Bus Services - Archibald McVicar
- McVitie's – Robert McVitie
- MD Moody & Sons – Maxey Dell Moody
- MDB Communications - Michael David Brown
- Meijer – Hendrik Meijer
- Mee's Bus Lines - Russell Mee
- Melitta – Melitta Bentz
- Mellon Financial Corporation – Thomas Mellon
- Menards – John Menard Jr.
- Menzies Aviation - John Menzies
- Mercedes – named by Emil Jellinek for his daughter Mercédès Jellinek
- Mercedes-Benz – Mercédès Jellinek and Karl Benz
- Merck – Friedrich Jacob Merck
- Meredith Corporation – Edwin T. Meredith
- Merriam-Webster – George and Charles Merriam, and Noah Webster
- Merrill – Charles E. Merrill
- Merrivale - Merrivale Hemmes
- Merzario – Arturo Merzario
- Messerschmitt – Willy Messerschmitt
- Methuen – Algernon Methuen
- Metro-Goldwyn-Mayer– Samuel Goldwyn and Louis Burt Mayer
- Michael Kors Holdings – Michael Kors
- Michael Waltrip Racing – Michael Waltrip
- Michelin – André Michelin and Édouard Michelin
- Miele – Carl Miele
- Mikoyan – Artem Mikoyan
- Millarworld – Mark Millar
- MillenWorks – Rod Millen
- Minardi – Giancarlo Minardi
- Miramax Films – Miriam and Max Weinstein
- Mitel – Michael Cowpland and Terry Matthews
- Mitsuoka – Akio Mitsuoka
- Moët et Chandon – Claude Moët and Pierre-Gabriel Chandon de Briailles
- Molson – John Molson
- Mojo - Alan Morris and Allan Johnston
- Momo – Giampiero Moretti (Moretti Monza)
- Mondadori – Arnoldo Mondadori
- Montague Bikes – David Montague
- Monteverdi – Peter Monteverdi
- Moody's Ratings - John Moody
- Moog Music – Robert Moog
- Morbidelli – Giancarlo Morbidelli
- Morgan Motor Company – H.F.S. Morgan
- Morgan Stanley – Henry S. Morgan and Harold Stanley
- Morris Motors – William Morris
- Morrison Knudsen - Harry Morrison and Morris Knudsen
- Morrisons - William Morrison
- Morton Salt – Joy Morton
- Mosler Automotive – Warren Mosler
- Moto Guzzi – Carlo Guzzi
- Moto Morini – Alfonso Morini
- Mr. Gatti's Pizza – Pat Eure, née Gatti, wife of company founder Jim Eure
- MTM Enterprises – Mary Tyler Moore
- Munro's of Jedburgh - Jim Munro
- Murphy's Brewery – James J. Murphy
- Murrays - Ron Murray
- MV Agusta – Vincenzo and Domenico Agusta
- Myer – Sidney Myer

== N ==
- Nakajima Racing – Satoru Nakajima
- Nakamichi – Etsuro Nakamichi
- Namco – Masaya Nakamura (Nakamura Manufacturing Company)
- Nando's - Fernando Duarte
- Nardi – Enrico Nardi
- Nash Motors – Charles W. Nash
- Neckermann – Josef Neckermann
- Neiman Marcus – Carrie Marcus and AL Neiman, Herbert Marcus
- Nero – Nero
- Nestlé – Henri Nestlé
- Newman/Haas Racing – Paul Newman and Carl Haas
- Newman's Own – Paul Newman
- Nick Bollettieri Tennis Academy – Nick Bollettieri
- Nick Scali Furniture - Nick Scali
- Nielsen – Arthur Nielsen
- Niki – Niki Lauda
- Nina Ricci – Nina Ricci
- NIOA – Bill Nioa
- Nobel Enterprises – Alfred Nobel
- Noble Automotive - Lee Noble
- Norbert Dentressangle – Norbert Dentressangle
- Nordstrom – John W. Nordstrom
- Northrop – Jack Northrop

== O ==
- Offenhauser – Fred Offenhauser
- Office Kitano – Takeshi Kitano
- Öhlins – Kenth Öhlins
- Oldsmobile – Ransom E. Olds
- Olin Corporation – Franklin W. Olin
- Olivetti – Camillo Olivetti
- Opel – Adam Opel
- Oprah Winfrey Network (OWN) - Oprah Winfrey
- Orton Ceramic Foundation – Edward Orton Jr.
- Oscar Mayer – Oscar F. Mayer
- Osella – Enzo Osella
- Otis Elevator Company – Elisha Otis
- Otto GmbH – Michael Otto
- Overmyer Network - Daniel H. Overmyer

== P ==
- Pagani – Horacio Pagani
- Pamida – Patrick, Michael, and David Witherspoon, sons of company co-founder Jim Witherspoon
- Panhard – René Panhard
- Panoz – Don Panoz
- Papa John's Pizza – "Papa" John Schnatter
- Patek Philippe & Co. – Antoni Patek and Adrien Philippe
- Pathé – Charles and Émile Pathé
- Paul Cruickshank Racing – Paul Cruickshank
- Paul Frank Industries – Paul Frank
- Guillows – Paul Guillow
- Paul Morris Motorsport – Paul Morris
- PAX & Paxson Communications Corporation - Bud Paxson
- Peavey Electronics – Hartley Peavey
- Peek & Cloppenburg - Johann Theodor Peek and Heinrich Anton Adolph Cloppenburg
- Peek Freans – James Peek and George Hender Frean
- Penske Corporation – Roger Penske
- Penske Media Corporation – Jay Penske, the son of Roger Penske
- PerkinElmer – Richard Scott Perkin and Charles Elmer
- Perkins Engineering - Larry Perkins
- Perkins Engines - Frank Perkins
- Perot Systems – Ross Perot
- Perrier – Louis Perrier
- Perry Ellis International – Perry Ellis
- Perry Engineering - Samuel Perry
- Petty Enterprises – Lee Petty
- Peugeot – Armand Peugeot
- Pfizer – Charles Pfizer
- PGL Travel - Peter Gordon Lawrence
- Phil Ward Racing - Phil Ward
- Philip Morris International and Philip Morris USA – Philip Morris
- Philips – Gerard Philips
- Piaggio – Rinaldo Piaggio
- Pierre Cardin - Pierre Cardin
- Pinarello – Giovanni Pinarello
- Pininfarina – Sergio Pininfarina
- Pirelli – Giovanni Battista Pirelli
- Pontiac – Chief Pontiac
- Poole & Steel - Arthur Poole and James Steel
- Porsche – Ferdinand Porsche
- Porsche Design – Ferdinand Alexander Porsche
- Powell Peralta – George Powell and Stacy Peralta
- Prada – Mario Prada
- Pramac d'Antin – Luis d'Antin
- Pratt & Whitney – Francis A. Pratt, Amos Whitney
- Pressman Toy Corporation – Jack Pressman
- Price Club - Sol Price
- Primanti Brothers – Joe, Dick and Stanley Primanti
- Prior's Bus Service - George Prior
- Procter & Gamble – William Procter and James Gamble
- Promotions Varoussac, original name of the wrestling promotion later known as Lutte Internationale – Frank Valois, André Roussimoff (aka André the Giant), Louis Accocella (aka Gino Brito)
- Prost Grand Prix – Alain Prost
- PRS Guitars – Paul Reed Smith
- PwC – Samuel Lowell Price, Edwin Waterhouse, William Cooper
- Pye – William George Pye

== Q ==
- Quaife – Rod Quaife
- Qvale – Bruce Qvale

== R ==
- R&W Hawthorn - Robert and William Hawthorn
- Rabanne - Paco Rabanne
- Railton – Reid Railton
- Rainer-Wurz.com – Markus Rainer and Alexander Wurz
- Ralph Lauren Corporation - Ralph Lauren
- Ralt – Ron and Austin Lewis Tauranac
- RAM Racing – Mike Ralph and John Macdonald
- Ramsay Health Care - Paul Ramsay
- Rawlings – George and Alfred Rawlings
- RCR Tomlinson - Ernest and Edward Tomlinson
- RE Amemiya – Asami Amemiya
- Rebaque – Héctor Rebaque
- Reckitt Benckiser - Isaac Reckitt and Johann Benckiser
- Reece Group - Harold Reece
- Reed - Alec Reed
- Reg Grundy Organisation - Reg Grundy
- Reiter Engineering – Hans Reiter
- Renault – Louis Renault
- Rensi-Hamilton Racing – Ed and Sam Rensi, and Bobby Hamilton Jr.
- Reo Motor Car Company – Ransom E. Olds
- Reuters – Paul Reuter
- Reynard Motorsport – Adrian Reynard
- RFW - Robert Frederick Whitehead
- Richard Childress Racing – Richard Childress
- Richard Petty Motorsports – Richard Petty
- Rickenbacker – Adolph Rickenbacher
- Riddell Sports Group – John Tate Riddell
- Rieger Tuning – Toni Rieger
- Riese und Müller – Markus Riese and Heiko Müller
- Riley & Scott – Bob Riley and Mark Scott
- Riley Motor – William Riley
- Riley Technologies – Bob and Bill Riley
- Rimac Automobili – Mate Rimac
- Rimmel – Eugène Rimmel
- Rimowa - Richard Morszeck
- Rinspeed – Frank Rinderknecht
- Ripspeed – Keith Ripp
- Rizzoli-Corriere della Sera – Angelo Rizzoli
- RJ Reynolds Tobacco Company – Richard Joshua Reynolds
- RM Auctions – Rob Myers
- RM Williams – RM Williams
- RML Group – Ray Mallock
- Robert Dyas – Robert Dyas
- Roberts Radio – Harry Roberts
- Roche - Adèle La Roche, first wife of Fritz Hoffmann-La Roche
- Rockefeller Group – John D. Rockefeller Jr.
- Rockwell International, North American Rockwell, Rockwell Semiconductor – Willard Rockwell
- Rod Nash Racing – Rod Nash
- Rogers Communications – Edward Samuel Rogers
- Rogers Locomotive and Machine Works – Thomas Rogers
- Rogers Vacuum Tube Company – Edward S. Rogers, Sr.
- Rolls-Royce plc, Rolls-Royce Motor Cars – Charles Rolls and Henry Royce
- Romano Racing - Paul Romano
- Rondel Racing – Ron Dennis and Neil Trundle
- Rootes Group – William Rootes
- Roper Technologies - George D. Roper
- Rosman Ferries - Charles Rosman
- Rossetti Architects – Gino Rossetti and Matthew L. Rossetti
- Rothmans – Louis Rothman
- Roush Performance, Roush Fenway Racing – Jack Roush
- Rowntree's – Henry Isaac Rowntree
- Royal Doulton - Henry Doulton
- Royal Shakespeare Company - William Shakespeare
- RPG Group – Rama Prasad Goenka, India
- RSA Security – Ron Rivest, Adi Shamir and Leonard Adleman
- Rudge-Whitworth – Daniel Rudge
- Ruf Automobile – Alois Ruf
- Russell & Bromley – Albion Russell and George Frederick Bromley
- RW Miller - Robert William Miller
- Ryanair – Tony Ryan
- Ryman - Henry J. Ryman

== S ==
- Saatchi & Saatchi - Maurice and Charles Saatchi
- Sainsbury's – John James Sainsbury
- Saks Fifth Avenue – Andrew Saks
- Saleen – Steve Saleen
- Sam's Club – Sam Walton
- Samsonite – Samson
- Samuel Ledgard - Samuel Ledgard
- Samuel Smith Old Brewery – Samuel Smith
- Sanders Coaches - Norman Sanders
- Santoni – Andrea and Rosa Santoni
- Sauber – Peter Sauber
- Savills - Alfred Savill
- Savoia-Marchetti – Umberto Savoia and Alessandro Marchetti
- Sbarro – Gennaro and Carmela Sbarro
- Sbarro – Franco Sbarro
- SC Johnson – Samuel Curtis Johnson Sr.
- Schiaparelli - Elsa Schiaparelli
- Schlecker – Anton Schlecker
- Schneider Electric - Adolphe and Eugène Schneider
- Schnitzer Motorsport – Josef and Herbert Schnitzer
- Schweppes – Johann Jacob Schweppe
- Schwind eye tech solutions – Herbert Schwind
- Schwinn Bicycle Company – Ignaz Schwinn
- Scott – Ed Scott
- Scott Dunn - Scott Dunn
- Scott's Transport - Allan Scott
- Sears – Richard Warren Sears
- Sears, Roebuck – Richard Warren Sears and Alvah Roebuck
- Seeburg Corporation – Justus Sjöberg (Anglicized name)
- Seecamp – Ludwig Wilhelm Seecamp
- Seedorf Racing – Clarence Seedorf
- Selfridges – Harry Gordon Selfridge
- Sennheiser electronic – Fritz Sennheiser
- Shakespeare Fishing Tackle – William Shakespeare
- Shanghai Tang – David Tang
- Shaw Brothers Studio, Shaw Organisation – Run Run Shaw and Runme Shaw
- Shearings - Herbert Shearing
- Sheetz – Bob Sheetz
- Sherwin-Williams Company – Henry Sherwin and Edward Williams
- Shimano – Shozaburo Shimano
- Shugart Associates – Alan Shugart
- Shure Incorporated – Sidney Shure
- Sid Fogg's - Amos Fogg
- Siemens – Werner von Siemens
- Sikorsky Aircraft – Igor Sikorsky
- Simogo - Simon Flesser and Magnus "Gordon" Gardebäck
- Simonds Coach & Travel - Roland Simonds
- Simpson Performance Products – Bill Simpson
- Simpsons of Piccadilly - Alexander Simpson
- Sinclair Broadcast Group – Julian Sinclair Smith
- Sinclair Radionics, Sinclair Research, Sinclair Vehicles – Clive Sinclair
- Singer Corporation – Isaac Merritt Singer
- Singer Motors – George Singer
- Skennars - Clarrie Skennar
- Skills Coaches - Arthur Skill
- Skip Barber Racing School – Skip Barber
- Škoda – Emil Škoda
- Slater & Gordon - Bill Slater and Hugh Gordon
- Smirnoff – Piotr Arsenieyevich Smirnov
- Smith & Nephew – Thomas James Smith and nephew Horatio Nelson Smith
- Smith & Wesson – Horace Smith and Daniel B. Wesson
- Smiths Crisps - Frank Smith
- Smorgon Steel - Victor Smorgon
- Soennecken – Friedrich Soennecken
- Sopwith Aviation Company – Thomas Sopwith
- Sotheby's – John Sotheby
- Soul Patts - Lewy Pattinson
- Spice Engineering – Gordon Spice
- Spyker - Jacobus and Hendrik-Jan Spijker
- Staedtler – Friedrich Staedtler
- Stanley Black & Decker – Frederick Trent Stanley, S. Duncan Black and Alonzo Decker
  - formerly Stanley Works, named after the aforementioned Stanley
- Steinway & Sons – Henry Steinway
- Stephensons of Essex - John Stephenson
- Stern – Sam Stern
- Stevensons of Uttoxeter - John Stevenson
- Stewart Grand Prix – Jackie and Paul Stewart
- Stewart Haas Racing – Tony Stewart and Gene Haas (via Haas Automation)
- Stewart-Warner – John K. Stewart and Arthur Warner
- Stewart & Sons - Matthew Stewart
- Stihl – Andreas Stihl
- Stillen – Steve Millen
- Stobart Group – Eddie Stobart
- Stockmann – Georg Franz Stockmann
- Stone Brothers Racing – Ross and Jim Stone
- Strömberg – Gottfrid Strömberg
- Sturm, Ruger & Company – Alexander McCormick Sturm and Bill Ruger
- Stutz Motor Company – Harry Stutz
- Suchard – Philippe Suchard
- Sukhoi – Pavel Sukhoi
- Sullivan Bluth Studios – Don Bluth and Morris Sullivan
- Sullivan Buses - Dean Sullivan
- Sumitomo Group – Sumitomo Masatomo
- Super Aguri F1 – Aguri Suzuki
- Surtees – John Surtees
- Suzuki – Michio Suzuki
- Swarovski – Daniel Swarovski
- Swire - John Swire
- Syco Entertainment - Simon Cowell

== T ==
- T Cowie - Tom Cowie
- Taco Bell – Glen Bell
- Taft Broadcasting – Charles Phelps Taft
- TAG Heuer – Eduardo Heuer
- Tamiya – Yoshio Tamiya
- Tandy Corporation – Dave Tandy
- Tanfoglio – Tanfoglio Giuseppe
- Taser International – Thomas A. Swift's Electric Rifle
- Tata Group – Jamsetji Tata
- Tate & Lyle – Henry Tate and Abram Lyle
- Taylor Wimpey – Frank Taylor and George Wimpey
- Taylor Woodrow – Frank Taylor and Jack Woodrow
- Teacher's Highland Cream – William Teacher
- Team Goh – Kazimuchi Goh
- Team LCR – Lucio Cecchinello
- Ten Kate Racing – Gerrit ten Kate, named after his nephew Ronald's motorcycle dealership Ten Kate Motorcycles
- Terrytoons – Paul Terry
- Tesco – T.E. Stockwell and Jack Cohen
- Tesla – Nikola Tesla
- Testor Corporation – Nils Testor
- Tetley's Brewery (Joshua Tetley & Sons) – Joshua Tetley
- Theakston Brewery – Robert Theakston
- Thiess - Leslie Thiess
- Thomas B. Jeffery Company – Thomas B. Jeffery
- Thomas Cook Group, Thomas Cook Airlines, Thomas Cook & Son – Thomas Cook
- Thomas Green & Son - Thomas Green
- Thomas Nationwide Transport - Ken Thomas
- Thomson Corporation – Roy Thomson, 1st Baron Thomson of Fleet
- Various named after Elihu Thomson:
  - Alstom
  - Thomson-CSF
  - Thomson-Houston Electric Company
  - Thomson SA
- Thompsons Bus Service - Geoff Thompson
- Thonet - Michael Thonet
- Thorn Electrical Industries – Jules Thorn
- Thorntons (British chocolatier) – Joseph William Thornton
- Thorntons (U.S. convenience store chain) – James H. Thornton
- Thrupp & Maberly (former coachbuilders) – George Thrupp and George Maberly
- THX – Tomlinson Holman
- ThyssenKrupp – Thyssen family and the Krupp family
- Tiffany & Co – Charles Lewis Tiffany
- Tiffen – Sol Tiffen
- Tilling Group - Thomas Tilling
- Tim Hortons – Tim Horton
- Timken Company – Henry Timken
- Tinsley & Hull – Fleming Davies Tinsley and Daniel B. Hull
- Toblerone – Theodor Tobler
- Tokuma Shoten – Yasuyoshi Tokuma
- Toleman – Ted Toleman
- Toll Group - Albert Toll
- Tom Ford - Tom Ford
- Tom Walkinshaw Racing – Tom Walkinshaw
- Tommy Hilfiger – Tommy Hilfiger
- Tommy Kaira – Yoshikazu Tomita and Kikuo Kaira
- TOM'S – Nobuhide Tachi and Kiyoshi Oiwa (Tachi Oiwa Motor Sport)
- Tom's of Maine – Tom and Kate Chappell
- Toni & Guy – Toni and Guy Mascolo
- Tony Roma's – Tony Roma
- Tooheys - John Toohey
- Towers Perrin – John Towers and Charles Perrin
- Toyota Industries – Sakichi Toyoda
- Toyota – Kiichiro Toyoda
- Trane – James and Reuben Trane
- Trathens Travel Services - Fred Trathen
- Travel de Courcey - Mike de Courcey
- Triple F Racing – Dean, Paul and Todd Fiore
- Trump Organization – Fred Trump
- Trump Shuttle, Trump Entertainment Resorts, Trump Taj Mahal – Donald Trump
- Tupolev – Andrei Tupolev
- Tupperware Brands – Earl Tupper
- Turner Broadcasting System – Ted Turner
- TVR – Trevor Wilkinson
- TVS Motors, TVS Electronics – TV Sundaram Iyengar
- Twinings – Thomas Twining
- Tyrrell Racing – Ken Tyrrell

== U ==
- Ukrop's – Joseph Ukrop

== V ==
- Valentino – Valentino Garavani
- Vanwall – Tony Vandervell
- Vel’s Parnelli Jones Racing – Velco Miletich and Parnelli Jones
- Versace – Gianni Versace
- Verville Aircraft Company – Alfred Verville
- Vibram – Vitale Bramani
- Vicks – John Vick
- Victa - Mervyn Victor Richardson
- Vroom & Dreesmann – Willem Vroom and Anton Dreesmann

== W ==
- Waitrose – Wallace Waite and Arthur Rose
- Walmart – Sam Walton
- Walgreens – Charles Rudolph Walgreen
- Wall's (ice cream) and Wall's (meat) – Richard Wall
- Walt Disney Animation Studios, Walt Disney Pictures, Walt Disney Records – Walt Disney
- Walther – Carl Walther
- Walker Corporation - Lang Walker
- Walkers Crisps - Henry Walker
- Walker's Shortbread - Joseph Walker
- Walter Wolf Racing – Walter Wolf
- Waltons - John Walton
- Wang Laboratories – An Wang
- Warburtons – Ellen and Thomas Warburton
- Wardle Transport - Doug Wardle
- Warner Bros, Warner Music Group – Jack, Sam, Henry and Albert Warner
- Waterstones - Tim Waterstone
- Wayne Gardner Racing – Wayne Gardner
- WB Mason – William Betts Mason
- Wegmans – John and Walter Wegman
- Wells & Co – Charles Wells
- Wells Fargo – Henry Wells and William Fargo
- Wendy's – Dave Thomas' daughter Melinda Wendy Thomas
- Weslake – Harry Weslake
- Westinghouse Electric – George Westinghouse
- Whitbread – Samuel Whitbread
- WH Smith – William Henry Smith
- Whyte & Mackay – James Whyte and Charles Mackay
- Wiesmann – Martin and Friedhelm Wiesmann
- Wilkinson Sword – James Wilkinson
- Wilko (formerly Wilkinson) – James Kemsey Wilkinson
- Will Vinton Productions – Will Vinton
- Willi Betz – Willi Betz
- William Hill plc – William Hill
- Williams Grand Prix Engineering – Frank Williams
- Williams Sonoma – Chuck Williams
- Wilson Combat – Bill Wilson
- Winchester Repeating Arms – Oliver Winchester
- Winning Appliances – John Winning
- WK Kellogg Co – Will Keith Kellogg
- Wolfram Research - Stephen Wolfram
- Wood Brothers Racing – Glen, Leonard, Delano, Clay, and Ray Lee Wood
- Woods Bagot - Edward John Woods and Walter Bagot
- Woolworths – Franklin Winfield Woolworth
- Woottens Luxury Travel - Nick and Michael Woottens
- Wormald International - Joseph and Henry Wormald
- Worthington Brewery – William Worthington
- Wright Company, Wright Aeronautical – Orville and Wilbur Wright
- Wrigley Company – William Wrigley Jr.
- Würth – Adolf Würth
- WW Norton – William Warder Norton

== Y ==
- Yakovlev – Alexander Sergeyevich Yakovlev
- Yamaha Corporation – Torakusu Yamaha
- Yates Racing – Robert Yates
- Young's – Charles Young
- Yuengling – David Yuengling
- Yuke's – Yukinori Taniguchi
- Yves Saint Laurent – Yves Saint Laurent

== Z ==
- Zagato – Ugo Zagato
- Zakspeed – Erich Zakowski
- Zend Technologies – Zeev Suraski and Andi Gutmans
- Zeiss – Carl Zeiss
- Ziff Davis – William Bernard Ziff Sr. and Bernard George Davis
- Zildjian - Avedis Zildjian
- Zust – Roberto Züst
