= Schwind =

Schwind is a German surname. Notable people with the surname include:

- Moritz von Schwind (1804–1871), Austrian painter
- Arthur Edwin Schwind (1889–1968), American baseball player
- Wolfgang von Schwind (1879–1949), Austrian actor and opera singer
- Olga Schwind (1887–1979), German musician

== Companies ==
- Schwind eye tech solutions
