= Irene Hays =

British businesswoman and former civil servant

Dame Irene Hays DBE DL
- Born: Irene Lucas; 4 February 1954 (age 72); Gosforth, England
- Occupation: Businesswoman
- Title: Chair & owner, Hays Travel
- Term: 2009–present
- Predecessor: John Hays
- Spouse: John Hays (m. 1997; died 2020)
- Children: 2

Dame Irene Hays DBE DL (née Lucas; born 4 February 1954) is a British businesswoman and former civil servant. She is the owner and chair of Hays Travel, the largest independent travel agent in the UK, which she jointly owned with her husband John Hays until his death in 2020.

== Early life ==
Hays was born Irene Lucas in Gosforth on 4 February 1954 and grew up in Ashington, the daughter of Vincent and Isabelle Lucas.

== Career ==
Hays worked in local government, rising to the position of chief executive of South Tyneside Council and Sunderland City Council. She was later an advisor to Ministers and Secretaries of State in Whitehall and served as a Permanent Secretary. In 1980, her late husband John founded Hays Travel in the back of his mother's children's wear store in Seaham, Durham. Irene now owns the majority share.

She has been the chair of the Hays Travel Group since 2009. She was a non-executive board member at the Department for Education between November 2018 and December 2021 and was also chair of the Education and Skills Funding Agency (ESFA) management board. Irene was a board member of Sport England and The Academy for Sustainable Communities and a director general at the Department of Communities and Local Government.

Under her leadership, the company has expanded significantly, operating nearly 500 retail outlets nationwide and generating a turnover of approximately £423.5 million in the fiscal year ending April 2023, with gross sales reaching £2.2 billion.

Hays has been instrumental in driving Hays Travel's success, notably leading the acquisition of Thomas Cook's retail operations in 2019, saving over 2,000 jobs. Since then, Hays Travel has acquired five other businesses, both retail and online. Hays Travel also carries out the back-office support services for 120 independent travel agencies across the UK.

== Honours ==
Hays was appointed a Commander of the Order of the British Empire (CBE) in the 2008 New Year Honours for services to local government and Dame Commander of the Order of the British Empire (DBE) in the 2021 New Year Honours for services to training, education, and young people. and served as High Sheriff of Tyne and Wear from April 2023 to April 2024.

In December 2018, she was awarded an honorary doctorate by the University of Sunderland. Hays has also been awarded an honorary MBA. She was appointed a Deputy Lieutenant of Tyne & Wear in 2020.

== Personal life ==
In 1997, she married John Hays. They have one son and one daughter. John was the company's CEO. He died on 13 November 2020, after collapsing from cardiac arrest at the company's Sunderland head office.
