= The Herb Chambers Companies =

American automotive dealership group

- We don't sell cars. We help people buy them.
- Type: Private
- Founded: 1985 in New London, Connecticut, United States
- Founder: Herb Chambers
- Headquarters: Somerville, Massachusetts
- Area served: Greater Boston and Rhode Island
- Products: Auto Dealership
- Brands: Alfa Romeo, Audi, Bentley, BMW, Cadillac, Chevrolet, Chrysler, Dodge, Fiat, Ford, Genesis, Honda, Hyundai, Infiniti, Jaguar, Jeep, Kia, Lamborghini, Land Rover, Lexus, Lincoln, Maserati, Maybach, Mercedes-Benz, Mercedes-AMG, MINI, MV-1, Nissan, Porsche, Ram, Rolls-Royce, Smart, Sprinter, Toyota, Vespa, and Volvo
- Services: Automotive repair
- Revenue: $2.7 billion with 58,000 cars sold (2016)
- Number of employees: ~2400
- Website: herbchambers.com

The Herb Chambers Companies, usually shortened to Herb Chambers, is one of the largest automotive dealership in New England and is North America's 17th largest dealer group.

Herb Chambers is headquartered in Somerville, Massachusetts and operates 60 retail car dealership locations, representing 35 different brands. Herb Chambers has approximately 2,400 employees and was ranked one of the "Top Places to Work" in the Boston Globe for the tenth straight year in 2018.

== History ==
In 1983, after founding the largest office copier dealer in the world, A-Copy America, Herb Chambers sold the business to Ikon Office Solutions for $80 million. Ikon is now part of the copier manufacturer Ricoh. In 1984, Chambers was looking to purchase a Cadillac for personal use and while going through the process of buying the car he became so disgusted with the experience, he made an offer to purchase the dealership on the spot for $1.7 million. Chambers found the dealerships during the mid-1980s needed to improve customer service to sell more cars.

After opening the first dealership in New London, Connecticut, Chambers quickly added BMW, Honda, Hyundai, Porsche, and Mercedes-Benz franchises during the next few years.

In June 2012, Chambers began selling Lamborghini, Bentley, and Rolls-Royce brands in a showroom in Wayland, Massachusetts. In September 2013, Chambers acquired a Volvo dealership in Dedham, Massachusetts. In the fall of 2015, the organization's second Lexus dealership was opened in the town of Hingham, Massachusetts. In June 2016, Herb Chambers Volvo Cars (relocating the franchise from Dedham) and Herb Chambers Lincoln opened along the "Automile" in Norwood, Massachusetts with both dealerships offering coffee/snack bars in their customer lounges along with WiFi connectivity.

Today, more than half of the Herb Chambers locations sell higher-margin luxury brands. All of the dealerships are within 75 miles of Boston, the sixth-wealthiest metropolitan area in the country.

In July 2025, the Duluth, Georgia-based Asbury Automotive Group acquired Herb Chambers Companies, including 33 dealerships with 52 franchises and three collision centers, for $1.45 billion. The deal was announced in February 2025. Mr. Chambers retained ownership of a single dealership, Mercedes-Benz Boston, located in Somerville, Massachusetts.

=== Franchises ===
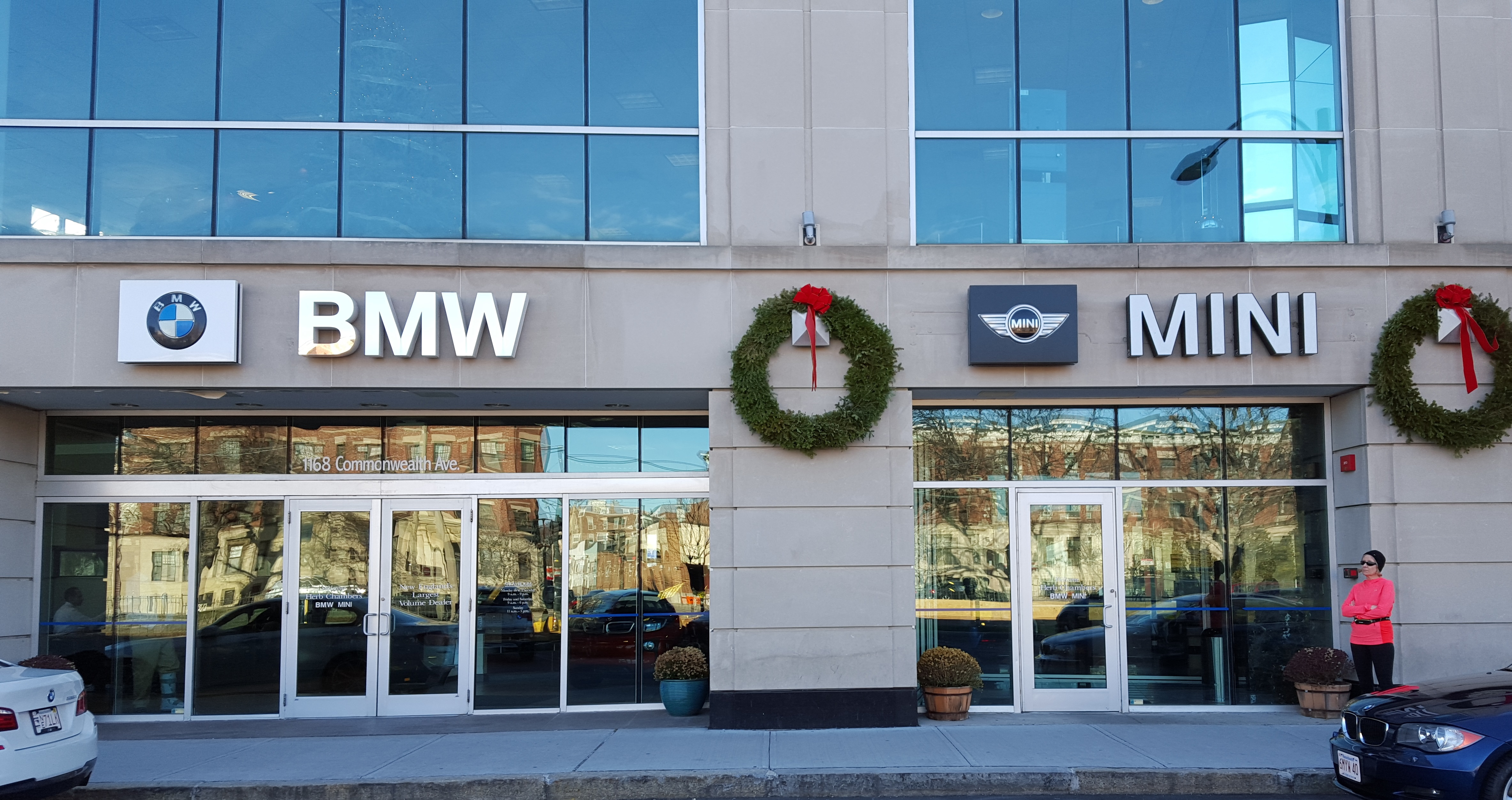
A Herb Chambers dealership in Boston, Massachusetts.

Herb Chambers currently consists of 60 automotive dealerships throughout Southern New England, primarily in the Boston-Worcester-Providence combined statistical area. The company holds franchises for nearly every automotive brand including: Alfa Romeo, Audi, Bentley, BMW, Cadillac, Chevrolet, Chrysler, Dodge, Fiat, Ford, Genesis, Honda, Hyundai, Infiniti, Jaguar, Jeep, Kia, Lamborghini, Land Rover, Lexus, Lincoln, Land Rover, Maserati, Mercedes-Benz, MINI, Nissan, Porsche, Ram, Rolls-Royce, Smart, Sprinter, Toyota, and Volvo.

The company is also the exclusive franchisee for MV-1, A2B Electric Bikes and Vespa Motor Scooters for the Greater Boston area.

=== Sales strategy ===
The view at Herb Chambers is that the days of the hard-selling tactics of new and used car sales are over. With the availability of the internet to compare prices, and the availability of independent, third party reviews, the car buyer is now more in charge of the negotiation. Herb Chambers was one of the first dealerships in the United States to use a no-haggle pricing strategy called the "Smart Pricing" program. They also have all used cars undergo a safety inspection before purchase and attempting to ensure there is no pressure from the salesperson. The dealer also has a refund program where the purchaser can bring the car back for any reason within the first five days and receive a full refund or within 30 days or 1,500 miles (2,400 km) for a full credit.

== Awards and recognition ==
The Herb Chambers Companies has received several awards, nominations and special recognition in the automotive industry. In 2003, Ward's Dealer Business, a publication of Ward's Communications, presented Herb Chambers Companies with the Ward's Dealer of the Year award "for honesty, exemplary customer service and employee care". Also in 2003, J.D. Power and Associates awarded 7 of the Herb Chambers dealerships with the Certified Retailer award.

In 2007, Ward's Dealer Business recognized the Herb Chambers Companies as the 7th most active auto group based on Internet Sales Volume. The National Automobile Dealers Association (NADA) nominated Herb Chambers Companies as the Massachusetts' nominee for the 2008 Time Magazine Dealer of the Year award.

In 2014, five Herb Chambers dealerships were awarded the DealerRater “Dealers of the Year” outstanding customer satisfaction.

In March 2015, Herb Chambers BMW of Sudbury was awarded a 2016 Center of Excellence honor by BMW of North America.

In 2017 Audi Burlington, BMW Sudbury, Herb Chambers MINI of Boston, Herb Chambers Cadillac of Warwick, Herb Chambers Lincoln, Herb Chambers Lexus and Flagship Motorcars of Lynnfield each won the 2018 DealerRater Dealer of the year in Massachusetts and Rhode Island for their respective brand.

In 2017, Herb Chambers BMW of Sudbury won 2017 Center of Excellence from BMW, Herb Chambers Audi Burlington won Magna Society Elite from Audi, Herb Chambers Audi Brookline won Magna Society from Audi, Herb Chambers Volvo Cars Norwood won the Volvo Excellence Award and Herb Chambers Toyota of Auburn won the Best New Car Dealer in Central Massachusetts award from the Telegram & Gazette.

In April 2017, Herb Chambers Honda in Boston received the 30-year award from Honda Motor Company.

In July 2018, 12 Herb Chambers dealerships in Massachusetts were awarded the J.D. Power Dealer of Excellence Award for the Customer Sales Experience for 2018. The dozen dealerships awarded were Herb Chambers BMW of Sudbury, Herb Chambers Chrysler Dodge Jeep RAM Fiat of Danvers, Herb Chambers Chrysler Dodge Jeep RAM Fiat of Millbury, Herb Chambers Ford of Braintree, Herb Chambers Honda of Burlington, Herb Chambers Honda of Seekonk, Herb Chambers Lexus of Hingham, Herb Chambers Lexus of Sharon, Herb Chambers Lincoln of Norwood, Herb Chambers Mercedes-Benz of Boston, Herb Chambers Toyota of Auburn, and Herb Chambers Volvo Cars Norwood.

In March 2022, Herb Chambers Ford of Westborough was awarded President's Award by Ford Motor Company.

== Charitable contributions ==
Each year during the running of the Boston Marathon, Herb Chambers hosts three different viewing parties close to the finish line on Boston's Boylston Street. The event raises money for the Dana–Farber Cancer Institute and The Jimmy Fund and are held at Mandarin Hotel ballroom, and Back Bay Restaurant Group's Abe & Louie's and the Atlantic Fish Co.

Herb Chambers supports pediatric care at Mass General Hospital for Children, The Boston Cup classic car show on Boston Common, Big Brothers Big Sisters of Massachusetts Bay, the Dana–Farber Cancer Institute and The Jimmy Fund UnMask Cancer benefit, and the NESN benefit to Strike Out Hunger.

== Controversy ==
In 2005, a Boston Globe report noted that four officials from the Herb Chambers Companies contributed to Massachusetts Attorney General Thomas Reilly's campaign efforts when he was attempting to run for Governor of Massachusetts. During this time, the auto dealer group had generated a large number of customer complaints to the attorney general's office.
