= Lisa Frank Incorporated =

American apparel and design company

- Type: Private
- Founder: Lisa Frank
- Headquarters: Tucson, Arizona, United States
- Key people: Lisa Frank (CEO); James Green (former CEO)
- Website: www.lisafrank.com

Lisa Frank Inc. is an American apparel and design company. It was formed in 1980 by Lisa Frank. The company produces colorful designs featured on a variety of media, such as school supplies and stickers.

== Company history ==
After graduating from Cranbrook Kingswood School in 1972 in Bloomfield Hills, Michigan, Lisa Frank attended the University of Arizona to study art. Her father, an art collector, had influenced her decision to study art. Between her sophomore and junior years, she made a line of plastic jewelry called Sticky Fingers. The line specialized in colorful fruit and novelty character pendants, utilizing popular characters in their designs such as Betty Boop. It sold in stores such as Neiman Marcus and Bloomingdales.

This jewelry line inspired Frank to create her first set of colorful stickers, the same stickers that launched her brand. She began Lisa Frank Incorporated around 1980. Soon the company received its first million-dollar order from Spencer Gifts. The company only produced stickers at first, featuring Frank's original characters and designs. All of Frank's designs through 1989 were colored with an airbrush technique, the process taking between nine and thirty-six hours to complete. According to a 1983 interview with Frank, the company's sticker process began with a concept, moved to pencil sketch, and then translated into an 18×24" painting before qualifying for approval. An individual sticker, on average, took a minimum of three months to approve.

Lisa Frank Inc.'s success rocketed in 1987 when the company began producing school supplies featuring their original designs. These designs featured colorful anthropomorphic animal characters such as "Panda Painter". The company believes the original characters continue to be their most popular, despite new additions over the years. The company's original commercial slogan, "You Gotta Have It", debuted in the late 1980s. Lisa Frank's line of products—folders, pencil cases, erasers, Trapper Keepers, and notebooks—were very popular, and the company grossed over $60 million a year in sales during its peak in the 1990s.

In 1989, the company stopped using the hand-painted airbrushing technique and switched to using computer software. The technological age not only changed the way the company designed products, but also had an effect on the products they sold. According to Frank, current designs feature more complicated and intricate patterns due to the technology and the variety of products the company creates today as compared to Lisa Frank Inc.'s starting years.

In September 2005, Lisa Frank filed for divorce from her husband since 1994, James A. Green, then president and CEO of Lisa Frank Inc. They were the company's only stockholders. That same month, she sued to remove Green from the company, and he resigned the following month. Frank won a court settlement that year, stating Green must sell all his shares in the stock to her at a discount, according to a 1995 buy-sell agreement. This resulted in Frank resuming her position as CEO of the company. During the court trial, they found Lisa Frank Inc. grossed over $1 billion in sales since 1979.

In subsequent years, the company produced little stationery due to a shift towards digital products. Lisa Frank Incorporated developed two iPhone apps: One customizes pictures with Lisa Frank clip art, while the other is a coloring app for Lisa Frank-branded coloring pages.

In 2012, Urban Outfitters began selling Lisa Frank vintage merchandise, such as 1990s stickers and Trapper Keepers, on the Urban Outfitters website.

As of 2015, the base of Lisa Frank Inc. headquarters was still Tucson, Arizona, encompassing a 320,000-square-foot (30,000 m^{2}) building. The company earned an estimated $2.3 million in annual revenue in 2012. Its branded retail stores have since shuttered and its products, which once dominated back-to-school aisles in stores across the United States, are difficult to find today. The number of employees at the 320,000 square-foot building near the Tucson International Airport dwindled from a peak of about 500 to just six.

A resurgence in popularity occurred in 2021 when Lisa Frank's 21-year-old son Forrest Green took over as Director of Business Development, starting by managing the company's Instagram account during the COVID-19 pandemic as a student at UCLA, with the marketing strategy of presenting the Lisa Frank brand as a lifestyle. Since gaining over 700,000 followers, the company has made strategic partnerships with popular brands such as Morphe, Pillsbury, and Crocs to create products for nostalgic consumers.

== Collaborations and influence ==
LFI's collaboration with Urban Outfitters in 2012 launched renewed interest in the company. Urban Outfitters sells 1990s Lisa Frank merchandise on its website. Frank said that Lisa Frank Incorporated saves ten copies of every product they have ever made, and Urban Outfitters sells many reproductions of their vintage products. Urban Outfitters did a video interview with Lisa Frank to promote their collaboration with her brand. The interview video featured a brief clip from a 1993 Lisa Frank commercial featuring a ten-year-old Mila Kunis. Lisa Frank Inc. was featured in Jeremy Scott's fall 2012 runway show in the form of a midriff corset covered in Lisa Frank stickers. In November 2020, Lisa Frank partnered with Morphe to launch Morphe x Lisa Frank, an eye shadow palette decorated with Lisa Frank characters.

Vaporwave artist Macintosh Plus named a song after Frank, "リサフランク420 / 現代のコンピュー" (translating to "Lisa Frank 420 / Modern Computing"). The song was the leading single of her 2011 album Floral Shoppe. In December 2021, Pillsbury and Lisa Frank produced the limited-edition Lisa Frank-branded unicorn-shaped sugar cookie dough.

In 2025, Lisa Frank collaborated with singer Zara Larsson on a limited edition CD album cover.

== Criticisms and controversies ==
A 2010 SF Weekly article criticized the sexualization of Lisa Frank characters. The article speculated that the brand, following trends for a "sexy" appeal in children's toys, abandoned the "classic" Lisa Frank animal characters for sexual Bratz doll imitations.

In 2024, a four-part documentary series titled Glitter and Greed: the Lisa Frank Story was released by Amazon Prime Video. The documentary series featured interviews from over twenty journalists and former Lisa Frank Incorporated employees, including former CEO—and founder Lisa Frank's ex-husband—James Green. In the series, former employees characterized Lisa Frank Incorporated as an abusive and grueling work environment. The company was described as a "Rainbow Gulag", and former employees recalled being punished and fired for leaving work early. James Green denied ruling the company as a "tyrant", instead saying that the true "tyrant" was Lisa Frank herself.
