= Ingle & Rhode =

English jewellery design company

- Industry: Jewellery
- Founded: 2007; 19 years ago
- Founders: Tim Ingle; David Rhode
- Defunct: 2024
- Headquarters: London, England, United Kingdom
- Products: Rings
- Website: ingleandrhode.co.uk

Ingle & Rhode was a company based in London, England, that specialised in the design, manufacture and sale of jewellery whose components could be traced to sources certified free of the taint of being produced in substandard working conditions or in a war zone.

== Origin ==
The firm was begun in 2007 after television documentary producer David Rhode had difficulty finding an engagement ring with a diamond that was "conflict-free" and a band whose gold component was procured with an eye to its environmental and ethical effects.

"His response was extreme, but timely," wrote reporter Josh Sims in The Independent: "He and "a university friend and former management consultant, Tim Ingle, have launched Ingle & Rhode, the United Kingdom's first "fine jewellery business" to "stress its ethical credentials—as all the materials they use can be traced back along the supply chain" to the source.

Rhode said that "there's no reason why ethical considerations shouldn't apply to jewellery," adding that "The last thing most people would want . . . to think that someone or somewhere was being horribly exploited in the making of it." He said setting up Ingle & Rhode was difficult because tracing the origin of gold is "anything but transparent." Ingle & Rhode reviews the inspiration behind their jewelry and provides insight into the stories behind their work.

== Environment ==
Florence Massey wrote for Vogue magazine in 2009 that:

The successful film Blood Diamond highlighted the corruption and exploitation that can be involved in the diamond trade—the reason it is so important for jewellers to make sure that their diamonds are fairly traded and let the public know that they are taking the necessary steps to deliver ethically sound pieces. One jeweller doing just that is Ingle and Rhode in Mayfair, London.

In 2007, Ingle and Rhode bought its gold from EcoAndina, based in Argentina, which nonprofit organisation had policies "to sustain village economies, introduce energy, irrigation and solar power systems, and to gather the gold the traditional way, by panning, the Independent said. "That cuts out the use of toxic substances."

In 2010 the Financial Times noted that the government of Zimbabwe had begun auctioning diamonds from "a notorious field where serious human rights abuses, including the use of child labour, have allegedly claimed hundreds of lives." The Ingle & Rhode firm was quoted by FT reporter Tony Hawkins in Harare as saying that "allowing Zimbabwe to continue exporting diamonds made a mockery" of the Kimberley Process Certification Scheme, established in 2003 to prevent "conflict diamonds" from entering the world market.

In November of that same year, the company signed a pledge not to buy gold from a mine proposed by Anglo American plc, which Environment News Service said: "threatens the world's most important fishing grounds for wild sockeye salmon in Bristol Bay, Alaska."

Ingle & Rhode has been audited by the Fairtrade Foundation, and a spokesperson in the office at 35 Bruton Street, Mayfair, told a reporter for EthicalWeddings.com that "the process was less of a headache than we might have expected. The Fairtrade Foundation seem to be very much on top of what they are doing, and running things very efficiently."

== Liquidation ==
In February 2024, reportedly due to rising costs, adverse impact from the pandemic and challenging economic conditions, Ingle & Rhode ceased trading.

The directors shared this statement: “It is with the heaviest of hearts that we took the decision that Ingle & Rhode should cease to trade. This decision was not made lightly, and we explored every avenue to try to keep the business going. However, in the end, the combined effects of the pandemic, inflation, and the economic slowdown have proved too much despite our best efforts. First and foremost, we are deeply saddened for our staff, customers, suppliers, and investors, all of whom have given us such fantastic support over many years.”

The Ingle & Rhode domain was acquired by Queensmith in February 2024. Sam Nobes, the Brand Director of Queensmith said “Ingle & Rhode’s focus on ethical engagement rings and fine jewellery aligns with Queensmith’s commitment to investing in sustainability and exceptional craftsmanship. Given their strength online and authority in such a similar niche to our own, the acquisition of Ingleandrhode.co.uk provides us with further momentum as we continue our digital expansion and grow our own brand of ethical, sustainable diamond jewellery.”

== See also ==
- Blood diamond
- Ethical consumerism
