= Manion's =

Defunct auction website

Manion's International Auction House
- Type: Private
- Industry: Auctions
- Headquarters: 4411 North 67th Street; Kansas City, Kansas 66104-1078
- Products: Miliataria, historical collectibles, and firearms
- Website: www.manions.com

Manion's International Auction House was an online auction website, and was one of the world's largest online auction houses specializing in historical military collectibles. Before its demise, the auction house had over 50,000 members, and over 20,000 auction items per month. Its headquarters was located in Kansas City, Kansas.

== History ==
The company started in 1970 and was incorporated in 1983. It published a black and white auction catalog every month with categories that included U.S., German, Japanese and European Military items. For instance, one of its notable items auctioned in 1993 was a 1934 command flag once flown by SS chief Heinrich Himmler. Bids were accepted by mail, phone, and later fax. There were fewer than 10 employees that photographed, described, packed and shipped items for each 30-day auction.

Manion's went online in the late 1990s, with their www.manions.com website. The site enabled members to view newly consigned items every day, create a Watch List to keep track of more interesting pieces, check their winning and losing bids, and receive the most up-to-date information via email.

In 2008, the Kansas City Star reported that Manion's had moved to a 4-day workweek for some of its staff.

In 2009, it offered at auction a vampire-slaying kit. "The kit comes in what looks like an antique jewelry box and contains a wooden stake, a single-shot pistol, 18 silver bullets, several crucifixes, holy water and three mysterious vials filled with unidentified substances," according to an article in the Kansas City Star.

== Closure ==
The company went out of business in 2014. Then CEO Jody Tucker blamed a January 2014 website crash for the closure, citing it as a catastrophic since it cannot be repaired in a timely manner at an affordable cost. The company also incurred millions of dollars of debt and that while some have been restructured and settled, other debtors opted to sue the company.
