= Hays Travel =

Independent travel agent chain

Hays Travel Limited
- Type: Private
- Industry: Hospitality, tourism
- Predecessor: Thomas Cook Retail Limited (450+ branches)
- Founded: 1980; 46 years ago
- Founder: John Hays
- Headquarters: Sunderland, England
- Number of locations: 494
- Area served: United Kingdom
- Key people: Dame Irene Hays (Chair); Jonathon Woodall (Chief Operating Officer)
- Products: Charter and scheduled passenger airlines, package holidays, cruise lines, hotels and resorts
- Brands: VISTA; Miles Morgan Travel; Millington Travel; Polka Dot Travel; Travel House; Cruise.co.uk
- Revenue: ▲£3 billion (2025); £2.55 billion (2024)
- Owner: Dame Irene Hays (100%)
- Website: haystravel.co.uk

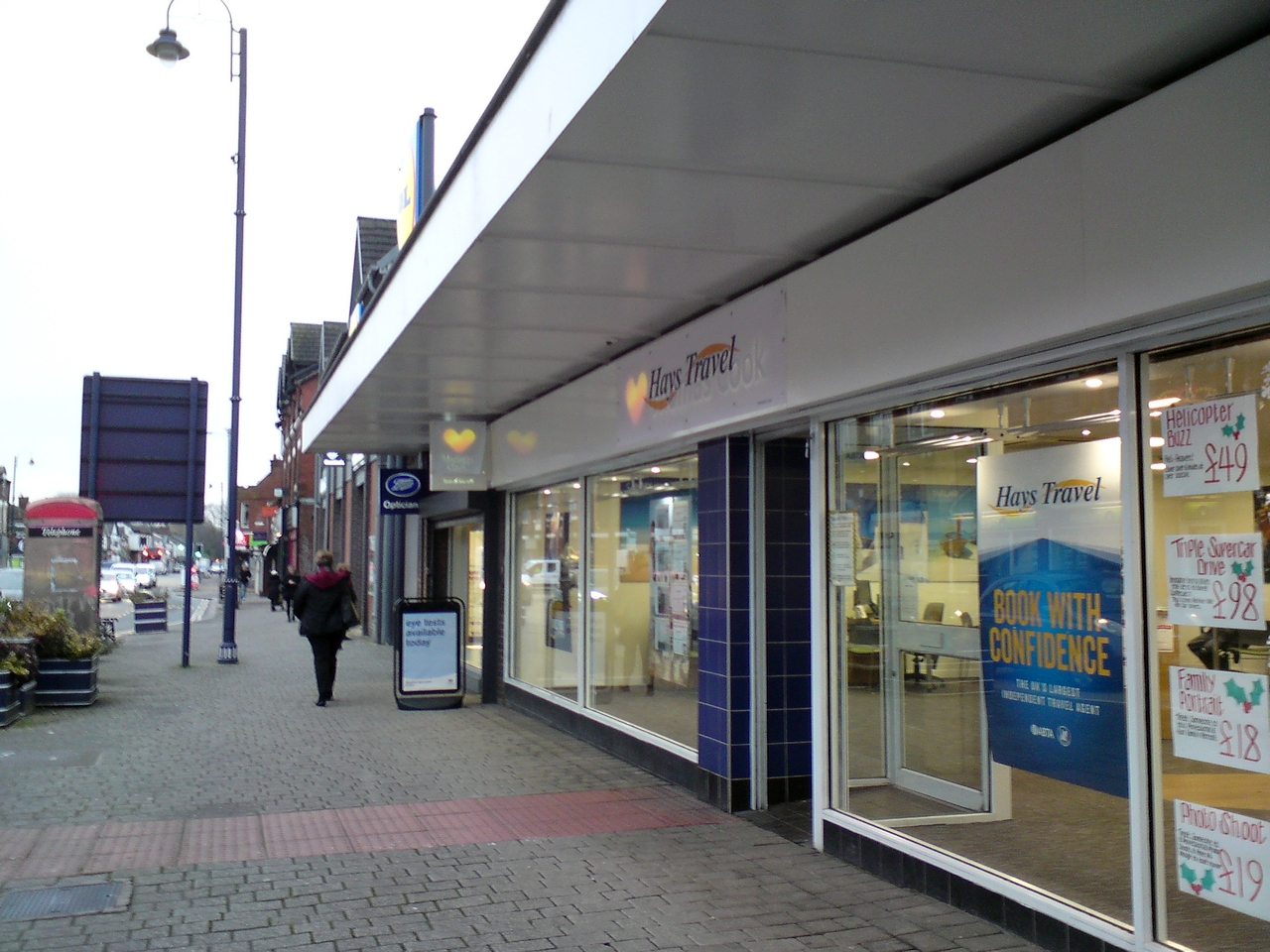
A Thomas Cook branch in Denton, Greater Manchester, taken over by Hays Travel, pictured in December 2019. The former branding is visible beneath temporary Hays Travel signage.

Hays Travel Limited is an independent travel agent chain headquartered in Sunderland, England. As of February 2024, the company has the largest number of retail travel shops in the United Kingdom, at 494. Nearly 90% of the company's bookings are made using travel consultants in its retail outlets. In 2023 Hays Travel also began selling holidays via their website.

== History ==
Hays Travel was founded in 1980 by John Hays in Seaham, Durham. Hays initially opened a small retail store behind his mother's clothing store. Since May 2018, Hays Travel reached sales of over £1 billion. The company's turnover increased by £42 million over 2017, when pre-tax profit was up slightly to £10.1 million. At the time, the company had around 1,500 employees.

=== Expansion ===
On 9 October 2019, Hays Travel announced that it had purchased all the stores of the travel agency Thomas Cook Group, another large travel group headquartered in the UK, which were expected to close due to the business entering liquidation during the previous months. The company took over 550 retail locations across the United Kingdom. News reports at the time indicated that Hays would almost treble the number of existing stores and double its workforce. The step of acquiring the stores was considered controversial within the industry at the time.

=== Later acquisitions ===
On 5 September 2020, Hays Travel acquired Tailor-Made Travel, a Welsh chain of travel agencies with approximately 100 employees. It announced the closure of 11 of the 19 shops a month later.

In May 2024 Hays Travel acquired Miles Morgan Travel, a travel agent with 19 branches. Hays continues to seek expansion through further high-street acquisitions.

== Employees ==
By the end of November 2019, Hays stated that it would hire an extra 1,500 staff, in addition to its 2,330 who previously worked for Thomas Cook. The total number of Hays Travel employees would total 5,700 people, after the planned hirings. In March 2020, following the purchase of Thomas Cook, Hays Travel was named as one of the Top 100 Employers in the United Kingdom.

On 3 August 2020, Hays Travel announced up to 878 members of its retail staff would be made redundant. This was mainly due to the effects of the COVID-19 pandemic.
