= Rieger Tuning =

German tuning and bodykit manufacturer

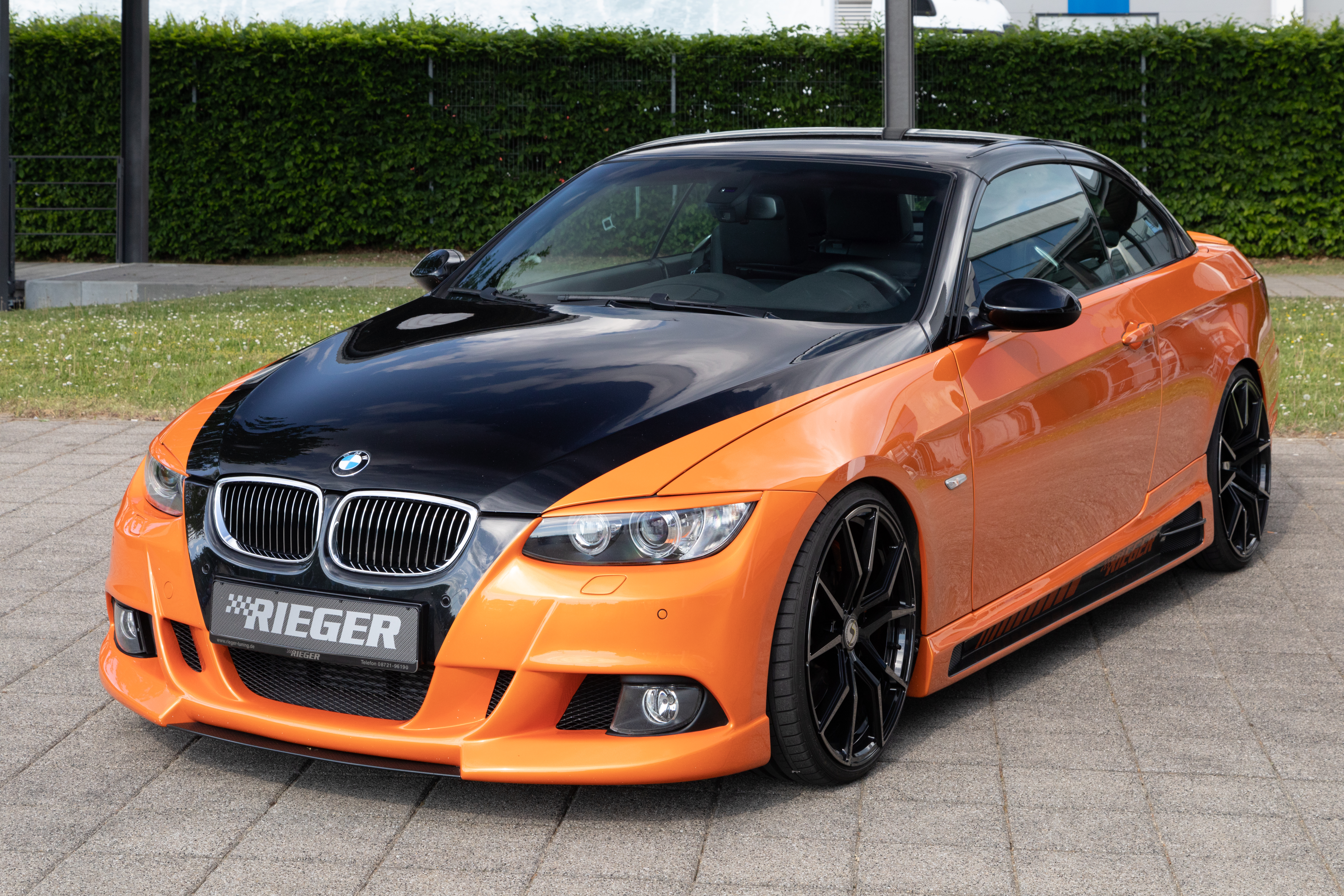
BMW 3 Series with a Rieger bodykit

Rieger, full name: Rieger Kfz-Kunststoffteile, Design und Tuning GmbH, are a German based tuning and bodykit manufacturer based in Eggenfelden.

Rieger Tuning was founded by Toni Rieger in a private garage in 1987. Rieger Tuning specializes in the development, production, and distribution of sport vehicle accessories, the focus being on body styling with the development and distribution of aerodynamic parts for the vehicles of predominantly European manufacture.

Since its inception, Rieger has grown from a one-man operation into a Tuning Corporation with a 29 full time employees and approximately 15 part time employees.

Foreign trade is over 60 percent of its sales. The corporate headquarters for Rieger Tuning in Germany is located an hours drive east of Munich.

A seven bay installation facility allows opportunity to work details of fitment so that when they send their products around the world installation instructions accompany each product.

The process of design, production and sale are completed under the same roof.

After a new item idea follows the model and tool fabrication, which is completed in-house. Production of the acrylonitrile butadiene styrene (ABS) plastic components is carried out on the automatic vacuum thermoforming machine. The pre-cut blank of the finished ABS component is processed by the computer numerical control milling machines which guarantees an exact fit to the vehicle.

The warehouse allows nearly 95% of all Rieger parts to be available for immediate delivery. A new production and warehouse with nearly 73,000 sq ft (6,800 m^{2}) was built in 2003.
