= Lisa Frank =

American artist and businesswoman (born 1955)

- Born: 21 April 1955 (age 71)
- Known for: Lisa Frank Incorporated
- Spouse: James Green (m. 1994; div. 2005)
- Children: 2

Lisa Frank (born 21 April 1955) is an American artist and businesswoman, the founder of Lisa Frank Incorporated, headquartered in Tucson, Arizona. She is known for producing whimsical, colorful commercial design for school supplies and other products that are primarily marketed to children and young adolescents. Her designs were popular in the 1980s and 1990s and experienced a resurgence in popularity in the 2010s and 2020s.

== Early life and education ==
Frank's father was an art collector and introduced her to the work of such Pop Art artists as Peter Max. Frank is a 1972 graduate of the Cranbrook Kingswood School, a preparatory school in Bloomfield Hills, Michigan. She attended the University of Arizona.

== Lisa Frank Incorporated ==
After moving from the Detroit, Michigan, area to Tucson, Arizona, in the 1970s to study art at the University of Arizona, she founded the children's jewelry company Sticky Fingers, operating at first from a guest house in Frank's back yard, which became Lisa Frank Inc. circa 1980 when she was 24. She continued to lead it as of 2019. As of 2021 Frank's son, Forrest Green, was the company's director of business development and partnerships.

== Designs ==
Frank's artwork features rainbow and neon colors and stylized depictions of animals, including dolphins, pandas, and unicorns. In the 1980s and 1990s, her designs were used on school-supply products such as lunchboxes and Trapper Keepers and for other products such as toys and stickers. Her designs were popular among elementary and middle school–aged girls. In 2011, they were used for a colorful line of clothing.

Frank's designs experienced a resurgence of popularity in the late 2010s and early 2020s during a wave of nostalgia for the '80s and '90s.

=== Collaborations ===
In the late 2010s and early 2020s, during a wave of nostalgia for the '80s and '90s, Frank's designs experienced a resurgence in popularity and several collaborations were developed featuring her artwork. Frank partnered with Reebok to release two versions of limited-release Reebok Classic Leathers shoes in 2017 featuring her designs. In 2017, Frank was partnering with producer Jon Shestack to develop a movie inspired by her work. In 2019, she designed the logo for John Mayer's Instagram television series, Current Mood. In 2023 she collaborated with Crocs on a line of platform clogs and with Evite on a line of digital invitations.

== Personal life ==
Frank is "notoriously private". In a 2012 interview video with Urban Outfitters, the company agreed to obscure her face.

In 1994, Frank married James A. Green, who from 1990 to October 2005 was president and chief executive officer of Lisa Frank Incorporated. They had sons born in 1995 and 1999. Frank filed for divorce in September 2005. That same month, she sued to remove Green from the company, and he resigned the following month. The court agreed to assign control of the company to Lisa Frank.
