= Prior's Bus Service =

Australian bus company

- Parent: Prior family
- Commenced operation: 1944
- Headquarters: Batemans Bay
- Service type: Bus services
- Depots: 1
- Fleet: 29 (December 2014)
- Website: www.priorsbus.com.au

Prior's Bus Service is an Australian bus company operating bus services in Batemans Bay on the New South Wales South Coast.

== History ==
In 1944, George Prior commenced operating services in Batemans Bay with a 1936 Ford sedan. In 1946, Prior purchased his first bus, and in 1948 successfully tendered to provide services to Moruya Central School which also included a mail and freight run on the return journey.

George Prior died in 1951 and Ron, along with his sister, inherited the business. Ron later bought his sister out. Gradually other operators were bought out. With the opening of Batemans Bay High School in April 1988, operations were refocussed. By 1992 the fleet had grown to 22 vehicles.

In October 1995, Prior's commenced operating a service via the Kangaroo Valley and Liverpool to Parramatta. This service ceased as from 23 June 2015.

== Fleet ==
As at December 2014, the fleet comprised 29 buses.
