= Herb Chambers =

American businessman (born 1941)

- Born: November 24, 1941 (age 84); Dorchester, Massachusetts, US
- Occupation: Businessman
- Title: Owner and President, The Herb Chambers Companies

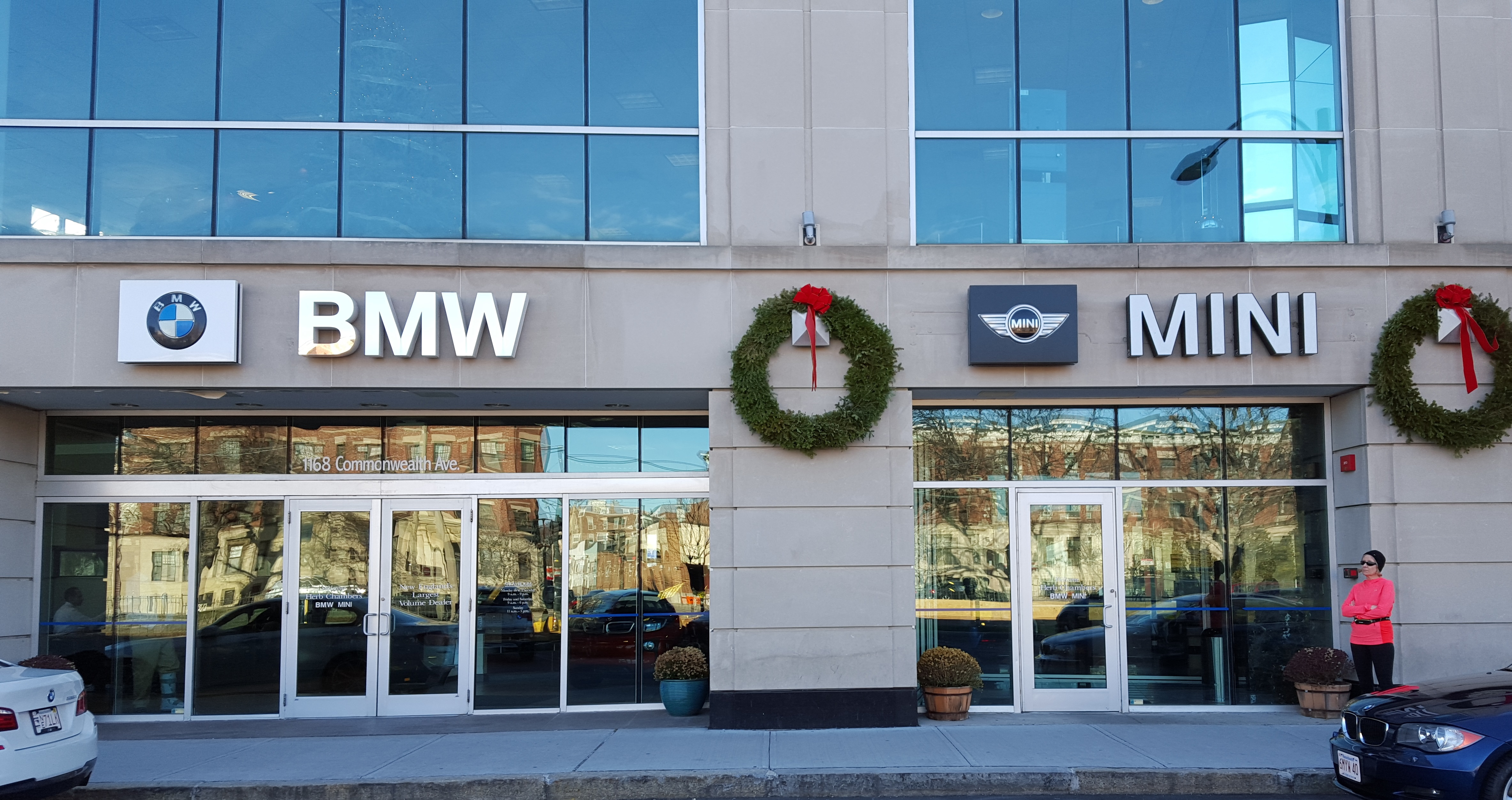
A Herb Chambers dealership in Boston.

Herbert G. Chambers (born November 24, 1941) is an American billionaire businessman, owner and president of The Herb Chambers Companies, a group of 60 car dealerships in the greater Boston, Massachusetts area. In 2015, at the age of 74, he was named as one of the 400 richest Americans, ranking number 392, with an estimated $1.8 billion, by Forbes magazine.

== Early life and career ==
Chambers was born in Dorchester, Massachusetts and was the son of a commercial artist and a homemaker. He grew up in a two-family home owned by his maternal grandmother. At the age of 13, Chambers' mother started charging him $15 per week rent and this was when he started working at the Stop & Shop supermarket in the neighborhood. He did very well at the market, earning promotions and raises, but his school work at English High School of Boston suffered. He ended up dropping out of high school in his senior year.

In 1959, Chambers was out of school and looking for a purpose in life, so he ended up joining the United States Navy as an aviation electrician. After four years in the service and acquiring the rank of Petty Officer Second Class - E-5, he returned home and started working at a South End bar that was owned by his mother. He worked for two months before being fired by his mother due to a scheduling mix-up.

After the Navy, Chambers began working as a copy machine repairman in Cambridge, Massachusetts for $75 a week, plus commission on any service contracts he could sell. By the time he was 22, he had started his own copier distribution company called A-Copy America, with money borrowed from his parents, in Hartford, Connecticut. The copier business was changing from a leasing model to a sales model due to the new low-cost copier models from companies like Minolta, Canon, and Sharp and Chambers started selling copiers along with copy supplies. His business soon became the world's largest Minolta and Canon dealers with 1,400 employees in 36 offices.

In 1983, Chambers sold the A-Copy business to Alco Standard Corporation for a reported $80 million and he continued to work with the company for another two years.

Chambers started his automotive business after purchasing an Oldsmobile-Cadillac dealership in New London, Connecticut in 1985. His decision to purchase the business was based on his own poor buying experience at the dealership. As Chambers improved the operations of this first car dealership, he started the Herb Chambers Companies.

In May 2017, Chambers was awarded the New England Motor Press Association Executive of the Year Award for his outstanding contributions to the automotive industry.

== Exotic car collector ==
In 2007, The Boston Globe carried an article and photo gallery highlighting Chambers' car collection. His collection of rare automobiles includes the McLaren F1, Mercedes-Benz SLR McLaren, Ferrari Daytona coupé and spyder, Enzo Ferrari, LaFerrari, 2006 Ford GT, 2008 Bugatti Veyron, Porsche 959 Supercar, 2006 Porsche Carrera GT, 2015 Porsche 918 Spyder, 2019 Ford GT Carbon Series, 1959 Cadillac Eldorado Biarritz Convertible, Ford Model B (1932) and a 1955 Mercedes-Benz 300SL that was raced in the 1983 Cannonball Run.

In August 2017, Chambers sold his 1995 McLaren F1 for a record $15.62 million at a Bonhams car auction held in Carmel, California.

When asked what car in his collection was his favorite, Chambers stated the 1972 Ferrari Daytona Spider that he owned in the early 1980s was his personal favorite.

== Personal life ==
Chambers lives in Old Lyme, Connecticut, and commutes to his Somerville, Massachusetts headquarters by private helicopter each Monday morning. During his flying commute, he often stops at one of his dealerships along the way for meetings. Along with a seven-passenger Bell 429 GlobalRanger helicopter, Chambers also owns a private jet and a string of yachts purchased over the years.

In May 2016, Chambers was awarded an honorary doctorate in business administration from the University of New Haven.

In 2016, Chambers helped to lead the effort to bring the Boston Police Department's mounted police unit back after it was disbanded in 2009 due to budget cuts. He donated $100,000 of the $1.5 million needed. In December 2024, Chambers donated $100 million to Massachusetts General Hospital for naming rights to its new tower housing its oncology center.
