= Gibson's of Moffat =

Scottish bus operator

Gibson's of Moffat was a bus and coach operator in Dumfries & Galloway, Scotland. It is no longer in business.

== History ==
Gibson's of Moffat was formed by James and Elizabeth Gibson in 1919. It initially operated a service between Moffat and Dumfries.

The war saw heavy loading on buses on the Dumfries services, which served army camps on route. Moffat served as a training area for many nationalities throughout the Second World War. By 1946 the firm had six vehicles, employed five conductresses and four drivers.

A new route between Whitehead and Dumfries railway station was introduced in 1986 following deregulation. This route later passed to MacEwan's.

In 1993 a humanitarian trip was undertaken to war-torn Croatia and the 2,500 mile round trip lasted 10 days. Clothing and money donated by the people of south west Scotland were taken to give to the needy there.

On 21 November 2007, Gibsons of Moffat ceased trading.

== Vehicles ==
Gibson's first vehicle was a Ford Model T which carried both passengers and goods. Fleet renewal before and after the Second World War saw four Albion PK115s and a PHl14 along with an Irvine-bodied Leyland LTSA in service by 1948. By 1949 the firm had a Leyland TD4c and a Leyland-bodied Leyland PD2 demonstrator, that was actually paid for with a suitcase full of £750 in notes. Two Scottish Aviation-bodied Albions joined the fleet in 1950, followed in 1950 by a Guy Arab 1-decker in 1954 and a Guy Arab IV in 1963.

New Ford R-Series coaches were bought in the 1970s – one was a fairly rare Willowbrook 002 model, after which a Plaxton Panorama Elite example and two with Duple Dominant body's were added. After the Fords, a Bedford with Van Hool bodywork which was destined not to operate in the fleet after type approval issues caused too much of a delay to its entry into service.

In 1978 the first new heavy weight coach was added to the fleet, OSM 588S, being the first of three 12 metre Leyland Leopards with Plaxton Supreme Bodywork.

While most of the fleet were single-deckers, Gibson's continued a long history of having double deckers in the fleet. An ex-Edinburgh PD2/20 was operated in the early 1970s while the tenth and last double decker, a Northern Counties-bodied Leyland PS1 was bought in 1975 and retired in August 1978. Changes in bus demand and car ownership made the single-deckers the best choice on local bus routes.

A Volvo B10M coach was ordered with Van Hool Alizee bodywork in 1982 and remained in the fleet right up until the end, some 25 years later. The B10M continued to feature in the fleet with various second hand examples being added, including a Berkhof Esprit, and a Duple Caribbean.

The move to rear engined coaches started with the purchase of a new Van Hool Alicron which had an MAN drive train. A second-hand example was also added to the fleet and both coaches went on to give many years of service. There was a brief return to Volvo in 1989 when an Ikarus Danube was added to the fleet,

An example of the rare Volvo C10M was bought in 1994, and was sold on in 1997. New coaches appeared again in 2000 when a new Bova Futura was added to the fleet. Another new example was bought two years later along with two second hand examples in 2003. The biggest intake of new vehicles occurred in 2006 when five new Setras were added to the fleet. These cost of £1.2million to purchase.
