= McKindless =

Former Scottish bus operator

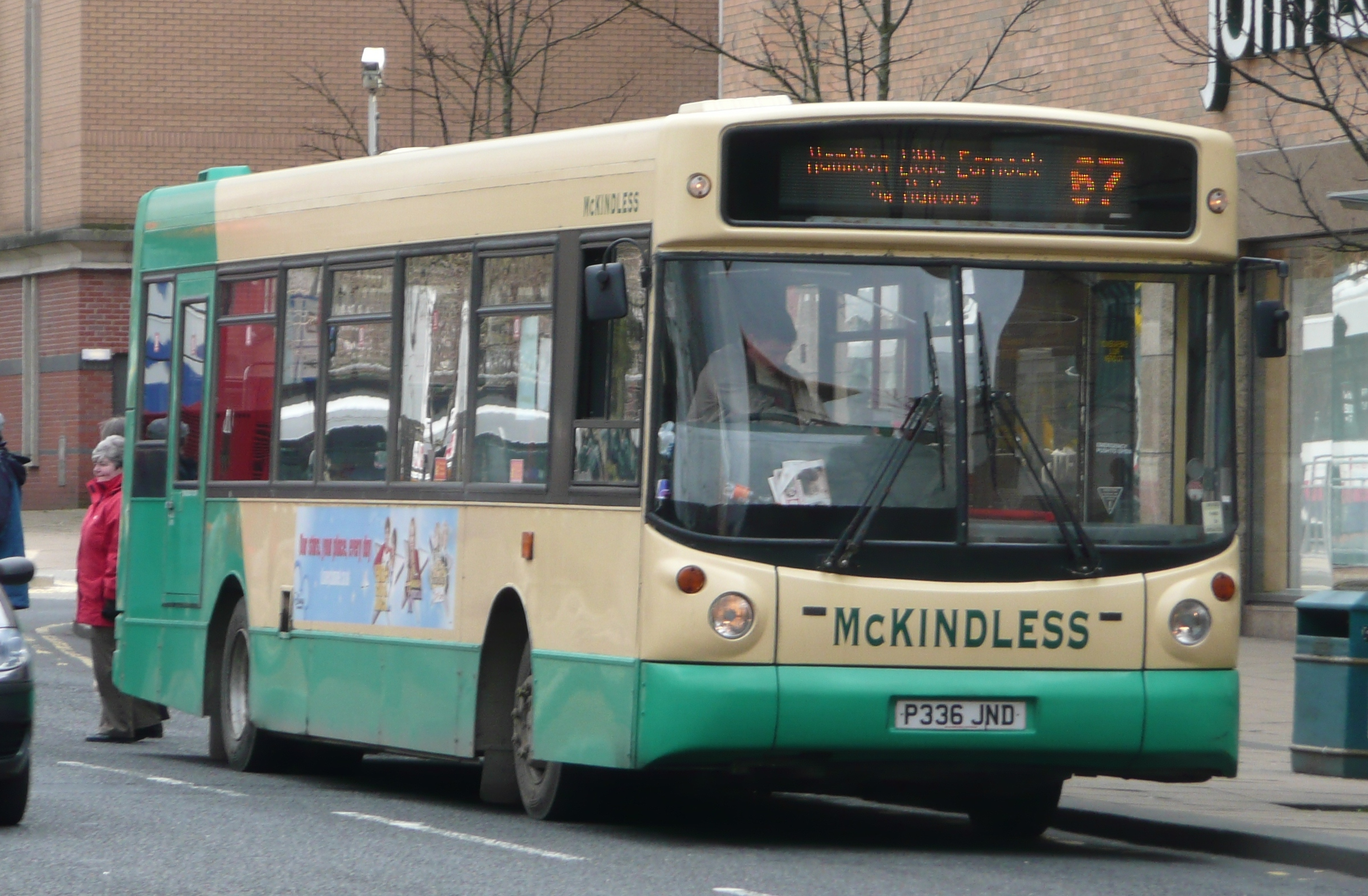
- A McKindless Volvo B6LE/Alexander ALX200 in Glasgow
- Founded: 1987
- Defunct: 2010
- Headquarters: Newmains
- Service area: Greater Glasgow; Glasgow City; North Lanarkshire; South Lanarkshire; West Dunbartonshire; East Dunbartonshire
- Service type: Buses
- Fleet: Dennis Dart; Optare Excel; MCW Metrobus; Leyland Olympian; Volvo B6LE

McKindless was a Scottish bus operator, operating a number of bus routes throughout Greater Glasgow, Scotland. The company was based in Newmains and had a depot in Parkhead.

== History ==
McKindless was founded in Newmains by Vincent and Margaret McKindless. It started as a small operation in 1987 with a few buses, a lorry and two coaches. Its aim was to provide school contracts and private hires but quickly moved into local bus operation. The first routes operated were:

- 68 West Crindledyke – Hamilton
- 61 Bonkle – Newarthill
- 66 Bonkle – Hamilton
- 56 Shotts – Hamilton

These services were operated with ex-Highland Scottish front-engined Ford R1114s and Leyland Nationals. In 1994 the routes and buses were bought by Kelvin Central Buses.

From 1996 Mckindless started a commuter shuttle between Wishaw and Glasgow, restarted the original routes and from 1997 started services to Cleland and Lanark.

In 2000, the company expanded again by opening a depot in Rutherglen and started operating a route with Glasgow city centre – Bishopbriggs – Kirkintilloch. By 2005 they had opened a new purpose-built depot in Parkhead and started route 62. The 62 route became their best route being very busy and operated by low floor vehicles.

== Collapse ==
The company ceased operation at 19:00 on Friday 19 February 2010. Many employees were not notified that the company was about to close, only discovering this when their shifts ended. The end of the company left 116 people unemployed. There were also allegations of tax fraud, with the Inland Revenue telling former employees that the company had not paid tax or national insurance contributions on their behalf since 2004. The company's depot at Bogside was taken over by new company P&C Buses, which also took on several former McKindless services in North Lanarkshire. P&C was itself dissolved in 2013. Since then, McKindless has been succeeded by JMB Travel, which operates many former McKindless services in Lanarkshire and uses similar branding to McKindless.

== Former services ==
Parkhead (formerly Rutherglen)

- 62: Glasgow – Clydebank – Faifley
- 67: Glasgow – Rutherglen – Cambuslang – Blantyre – Hamilton – Fairhill – Little Earnock (Hamilton)
- 75: Milton – Glasgow (used to operate to Kennishead before it was cut back to City Centre)
- 80 Glasgow – Springburn – Kirkintilloch – Harestanes

Newmains

- 6: Motherwell – North Motherwell (Motherwell Local)
- 9 : Hamilton or North Motherwell – Motherwell – Wishaw – Cleland
- 10: Cleland – Waterloo
- 21/X21: Lanark – East Kilbride
- 22: Coltness – Overtown
- 24: Wishaw/Coltness Circular (Main St, Dryburgh Rd, Coltness Terminus, Dryburgh Rd, Kenilworth Ave)
- 31: Hamilton – Larkhall – Lanark
- 41: Hamilton – Wishaw – Lanark
- 44: Wishaw – Bellshill via Cleland (also operated to Overtown at some point)
- 56: Hamilton – Wishaw – Shotts
- 68: Newmains – Hamilton (also operated to North Motherwell, Peacock Cross (Hamilton) and Bellshill at some point)
- 93: Cleland – Forgewood
- X1: Glasgow – West Crindledyke
- X2: Glasgow – Cleland

== Former fleet ==
When it closed McKindless owned 110 vehicles comprising a large number of makes and models. They operated six regular frequency routes with a peak vehicle requirement of 65. Recent additions included several Alexander Dennis Enviro 200 Darts with Euro 4 low emission engines. Other vehicle types used include MCW Metrobus and Leyland Olympian double deckers and various single deckers such as Dennis Darts, Volvo B6s and Optare Excels.

In late 2006 the company bought its first new vehicles: two BMC Falcons and a King Long single-decker. Their three express services were run with Volvo B10M and Dennis Javelin coaches. Three older vehicles, a Bristol Lodekka, an MCW Metrobus and an AEC Routemaster, were preserved by the company. McKindless had also bought ex-Hutchison Optare Excels to use on local routes in Wishaw, still in the livery of their previous. In July 2009, McKindless loaned an Alexander Dennis Enviro400 double-decker for demonstration purposes.

Steady investment resulted in the operator providing 100% low-floor vehicles on their local service routes in Lanarkshire since 2007, while operations in Glasgow were nearly 100% low floor by 2009.

== Depots ==
The McKindless Bus Group operated from its head office at Newmains and from a purpose-built depot at Nuneaton Street, Parkhead. The depot in Parkhead replaced a previous facility in Seath Road, Rutherglen.

== See also ==
- List of bus operators of the United Kingdom
