= Bocar =

Colorado sports car company

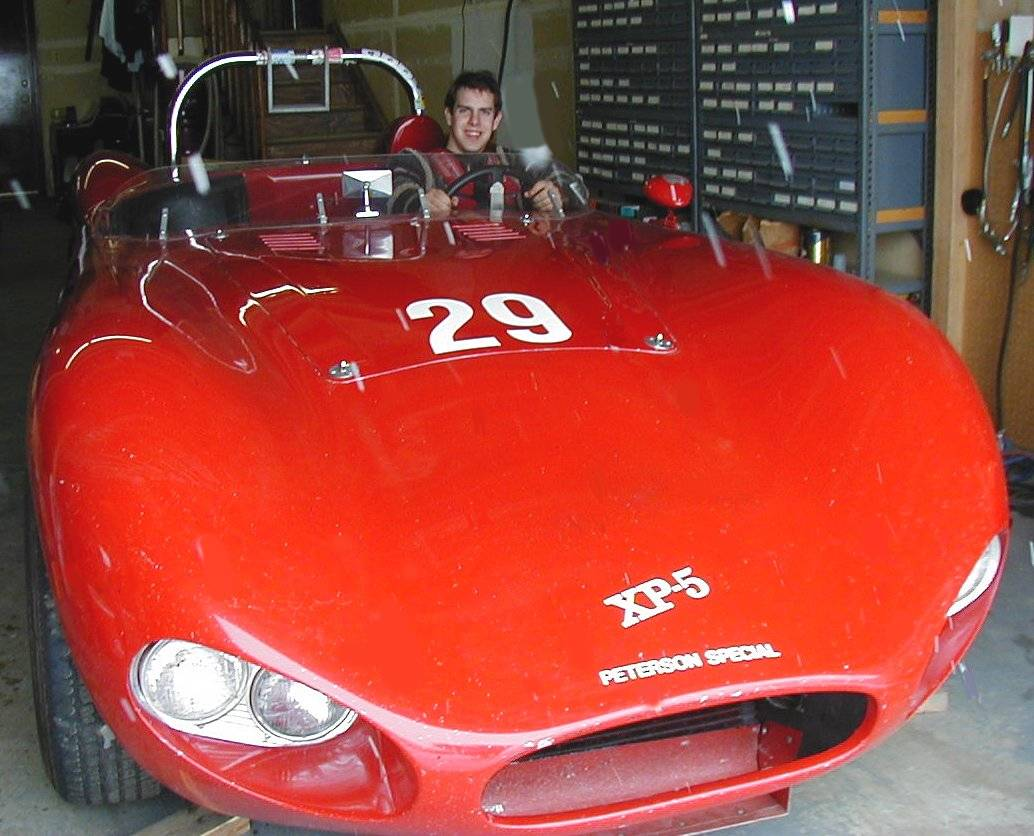
1959 Bocar XP-5 Peterson Special

The Bocar was a company based in Lakewood, Colorado that produced a limited number of custom sports cars between 1957–1961.

== Development ==
The Bocar was a series of limited-production two-seaters, developed by Bob Carnes in Lakewood, Colorado. Starting in his own garage, Carnes followed an evolutionary trail from a single, experimental X-1 in 1958. This was followed by X-2 and X-3 examples and about five XP-4s. Early models had a 90-inch (2,300 mm) wheelbase, Jaguar wire wheels, and Girling drum brakes.

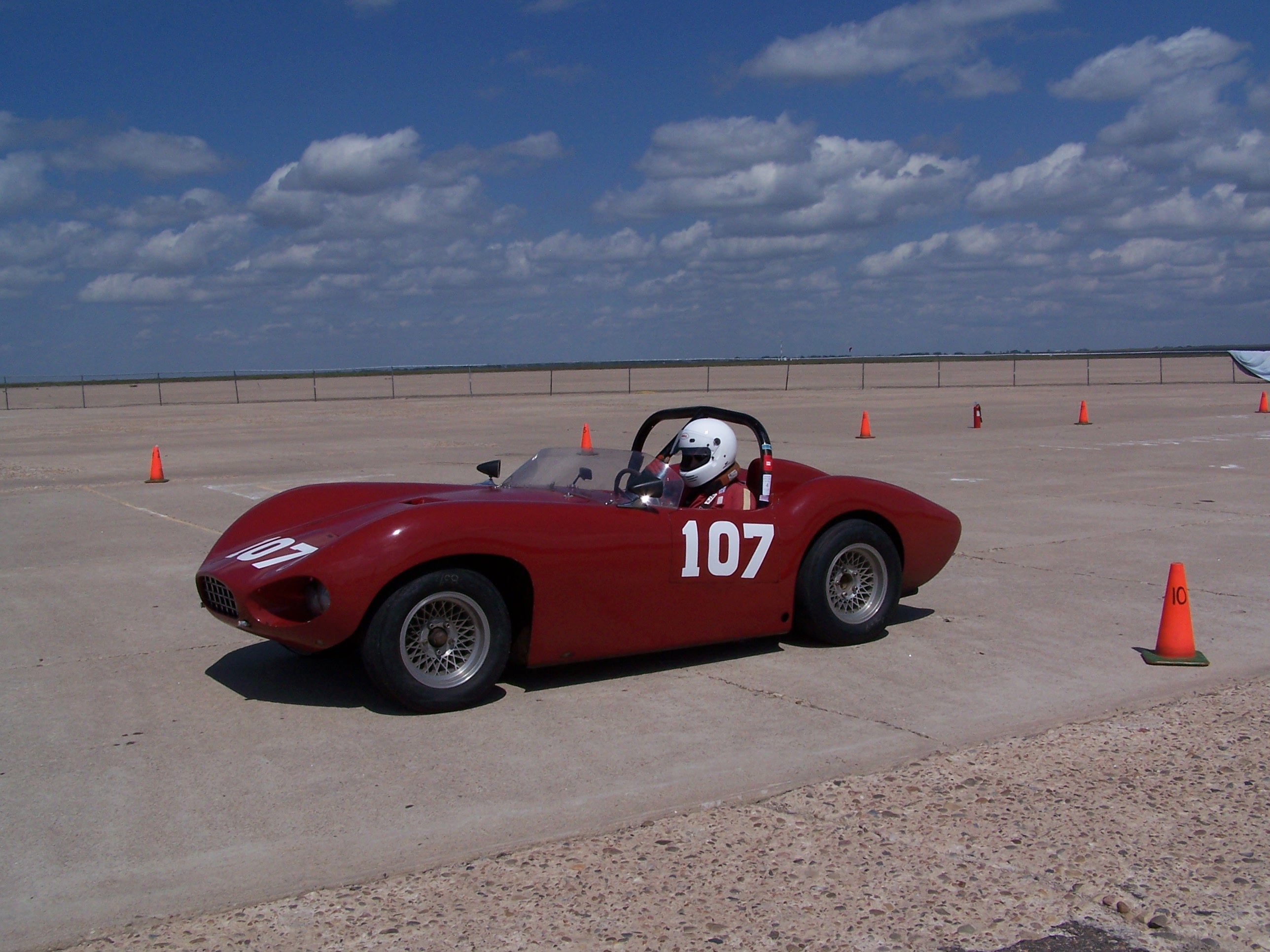
1960 Bocar XP-5 Serial No. 007.

The first real production cars, begun in mid-1959 were the XP-5s, on the same wheelbase. The Bocar XP-5 had a glass-reinforced polyester body surrounding a welded moly-tube space frame. Up front was a beefed-up Volkswagen rear suspension. Power customarily came from a 283-cid Corvette V8 engine, producing 290 hp (216 kW) at 6200 rpm. A small number of XP-5s were sold with Triumph frames, typically keeping their original suspension and brakes.

The Bocar was only 34 inches (860 mm) tall, with a four-inch (102 mm) windshield. A variety of options could be ordered: radio, heater, hardtop, seven suspension setups, and choices in wheels and tires. Carburetion or fuel injection could be specified for the Corvette or Pontiac engines. The typical cost was about $8,700. Bodies and frames were also sold separately.

The XP-5 was raced by Art Huttinger in the first televised Daytona race in January 1960. It was placed second to the D-Type Jaguar of Ed Rahal. It went on to set a speed record of 175 mph (282 km/h) on the beach of Daytona.

After approximately 15 Bocars, Carnes turned to the XP-6, on a longer 104-inch (2,600 mm) wheelbase. This was powered by a supercharged Corvette engine producing close to 400 horsepower. The XP-6 featured a crank-mounted roots-type GMC blower and Corvette fuel injection. Only one was built. The XP-7 was identical to the XP-6, but was naturally aspirated and featured a larger grill opening. The XP-7R was the supercharged version of the XP-7.

Mr. Carnes entered a red Bocar Stilletto in the 1962 Pikes Peak Hillclimb and was quoted by one major car magazine as 'throwing much dirt' as he made his way up the course. He had shifter problems when he reached the Devil's Playground area and lost two to three minutes trying to get the car in gear which effectively ended his hopes for a decent time that year.

There was a major fire in 1962 that totally destroyed Bob Carne's shop in Lakewood, and an XP-5 painted pink along with two bare chassis were destroyed. This effectively ended Mr. Carnes's construction of the Bocar.

== Stiletto ==
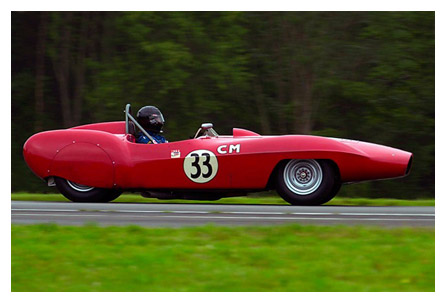
Bocar Stiletto

In the early Sixties, Carnes produced a strictly road-racing model called the Stiletto. The Bocar Stiletto was referred to as "Streamlined Lightning", and looked the part. The same supercharged powerplant of the XP-6 and XP-7R was housed in a long nosed, sleek racing body. Only three Stilettos are thought to have been built.

== Performance ==
Road tests confirmed the Bocar's performance, including acceleration times that would qualify for near-super car ranking, even today. A high power-to-weight ratio was a big part of the secret: roughly six pounds per horsepower, in a car that weighed just 1,650 pounds. Motor Trend described its XP-5 as "a 160-mph sports car" that was nevertheless "a road machine." Their test car reached 60 mph (97 km/h) in six seconds, and hit 100 mph (160 km/h) in the quarter-mile.

== Survivors ==
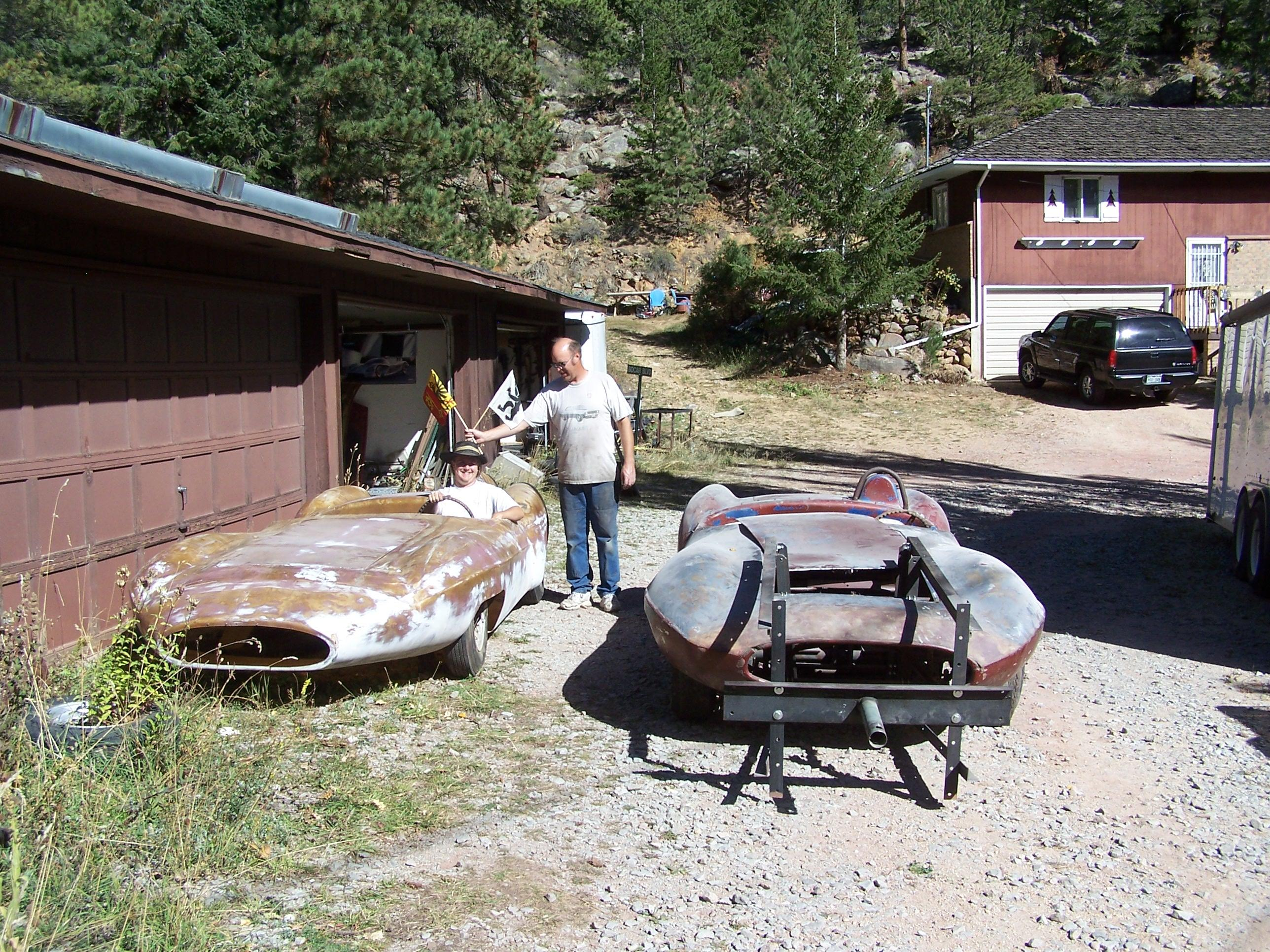
Pre-restoration Stiletto 2, and 3, in 2007

The earliest Bocar known to exist is the X-1, currently in the hands of Dr. Denton, who bought the car in Texas in 1965, and drag raced it.

The X-2 has not been located, along with the X-3 and XP-4 serial number 4.

It is unknown how many XP-5s still exist. One of 18 which have been found, bears serial number 166. The 1962 prototype, the only XP-5 to leave the factory with a 327 chevy engine, has been missing since 1968.

Bob Carnes' personal Stiletto is currently owned by Dudley Cunningham, and has made appearances at the Montery Historics.

The second Stiletto (the car on the right) was originally not supercharged, painted metallic blue, and shipped to South Carolina. A supercharger was later fitted at the factory, and the car raced at Nassau. It is being restored by its owner, Gaylon Curley, who also owns the third Stiletto, which is awaiting restoration.

== Footnotes ==
- Harold W. Pace and Mark R. Brinker (2004). Vintage American Road Racing Cars 1950-1970. MBI publishing. pp. 37–39. ISBN 0-7603-1783-6.: a good capsule history of Bocar
- Sportscar Graphic. No. June 1959. pp. 68–71.: an in-depth article on this American sports car, with pictures, as well as a full-page back inside cover ad for the car. Completed rollers were available starting at $3800.

== Sources ==
The Bocar Registry of Colorado, Road and Track 1960, owner and car list made by Gaylon Curley, surviving factory records, factory photographs, and information obtained from previous Bocar employees.
