= John Hays (businessman) =

British businessman (1949–2020)

- Born: 22 July 1949
- Died: 13 November 2020 (aged 71); Sunderland, Tyne and Wear, England
- Education: University of Oxford; Manchester Business School
- Occupation: Businessman
- Known for: Founder of Hays Travel
- Title: CEO, Hays Travel
- Term: 1980–2020
- Successor: Irene Hays
- Spouse: Irene Hays (m. 1997)
- Children: 2

John Hays (22 July 1949 – 13 November 2020) was a British businessman, and the founder/CEO of Hays Travel, now the largest independent travel agency in the UK.

== Career ==
Hays earned a degree in mathematics from the University of Oxford. He later earned an MBA from Manchester Business School. In 1980, Hays founded Hays Travel in the back of his mother's children's wear store in Seaham, Durham. Hays owned 56.42% and his wife Irene owned 43.58%.

== Personal life ==
John Hays married Irene Lucas in 1997. She has chaired the company since his death. The couple had two children.

== Death ==
John Hays died on 13 November 2020, aged 71, after collapsing at the company's Sunderland head office.

Business positions
Preceded by Founded	Owner of Hays Travel; 1980–2020	Succeeded by Irene Hays
Preceded by Founded	CEO of Hays Travel; 1980–2020	Succeeded by Irene Hays
