= Tinsley & Hull =

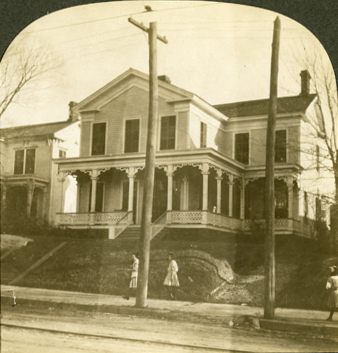
Fleming D. Tinsley house in Savannah, Georgia, on Johnston Street (now College Street), photographed in the 1870s

Tinsley & Hull was a based cotton brokerage in Savannah, Georgia, USA, which became insolvent in 1913. The company exported cotton, and phosphate rock.

Fleming Davies Tinsley, a native of Milledgeville, Georgia, an executive with the firm, was tried and found not guilty of larceny in the aftermath of the business' failure. He was accused of stealing 275 bales of cotton valued at $22,000 from the Savannah Trust Company.

Another principal figure in the corporation was Daniel B. Hull. He purchased a membership in the New York Cotton Exchange from Alan Bond, a member of the New York Stock Exchange, in May 1909.
