= Graham's Bus Service =

Scottish bus operator

Grahams of Paisley was an independent bus operator in Paisley, Scotland. Based at its Hawkhead Road depot, it provided local bus services around the town of Paisley. It also provided the Linwood Clipper express coach service from Linwood to Glasgow in the 1970s and 1980s.

== History ==
J & W Graham started trading at Linwood Toll in the 1920s with a Johnstone to Glasgow service using red single decker buses under the umbrella of the South Western Bus Owners’ Associations cooperative. Fierce competition from other buses and the Glasgow trams led to the elimination of the service and the four buses were sold to Western SMT in 1932. Single-decker buses were instead employed on the Linwood to Hawkhead service and were joined in 1940 by the first of seven ex-Glasgow Leyland Titan TD1 double-deckers to cope with increased traffic. A limited company was established in 1953, and around the same time, the livery changed to orange and cream, the colours of the former Young of Paisley fleet.

Services increased significantly in 1963 after Rootes (later Chrysler and then Talbot) opened its car plant in Linwood. The 1959 Elderslie to Penilee service and the Hawkhead route were extended, with the Hawkhead route connecting with the Glasgow Subway at Govan subway station. In 1973, Grahams of Paisley took over the Paisley Bridge of Weir service provided by Pattison of Paisley, dedicating two vehicles to this route. Garner, Bridge of Weir, participated in furnishing this service until late 1968. Grahams of Paisley extended some Linwood buses to Houston in early 1969 to replace the Garner service.

History turned a full circle in 1977, when the Greater Glasgow PTE sponsored a “Linwood Clipper” service, worked jointly by Grahams and Western SMT, which ran from Linwood to central Glasgow via the M8 motorway. For a time, Grahams also participated in the Kilmacolm to Glasgow "Link Line" services following the elimination of train services in January 1983, but later withdrew from the routes.

== Fleet ==
Double-decker Guy Arabs were the standard intake between 1944 and 1963 but finally disappeared in 1977. Their place was taken by Daimler Fleetlines, which were replaced by new or second-hand Leyland Atlanteans and the ex-London Transport Daimler Fleetlines. A Ford R1114 demonstrator, bought in 1972, was the first single-decker for many years and was followed by an assortment of single-deckers, mostly Leyland Leopards, to work on the Bridge of Weir and Linwood Clipper services. One of the more unusual vehicles operated was a former Alexander bodied M-Type Volvo which had started life with Western SMT on its Glasgow to London service.

At the close of business about 30 vehicles were operated.

== Demise ==
The company ceased trading on 29 April 1990, having been up for sale for over a month. Replacement services were provided by Western Scottish and Strathclyde Buses. The Western Scottish replacement routes largely operated under route number 28.
