= Schwind eye tech solutions =

SCHWIND eye-tech-solutions GmbH
- Trade name: SCHWIND
- Type: GmbH
- Industry: Medical technology
- Founded: 1958
- Headquarters: Kleinostheim, Germany
- Area served: Worldwide
- Key people: Domenic von Planta (CEO)
- Products: Ophthalmic devices
- Revenue: not disclosed
- Number of employees: >200
- Parent: Independent (1958–2016) ARDIAN Expansion (2016–2022) Adagia Partners (2022–present)
- Website: www.eye-tech-solutions.com

SCHWIND eye-tech-solutions GmbH is a Germnan provider of eye lasers for refractive and therapeutic corneal surgery, for the treatment of vision defects and corneal diseases. This includes the SCHWIND AMARIS excimer laser product family, SCHWIND ATOS femtosecond laser, diagnostic systems, and treatment planning tools.

The owner-operated enterprise, based in Kleinostheim near Aschaffenburg, Germany, employs more than 200 people and distributes its products in more than 120 countries worldwide.

Three months after announcing its intention to acquire the company, Adagia Partners completed the purchase of Schwind eye-tech-solutions in February 2022 for an undisclosed amount.

== History ==
Named after its founder, the enterprise was registered in 1958 as Herbert Schwind GmbH & Co. KG in the Aschaffenburg trade register. The company initially positioned itself as a full service provider and diagnostic supplier for ophthalmologists.

Founded in 1964, the subsidiary Titmus Eurocon was created, to specialize in the development of contact lenses. In 1972, with the introduction of the first soft contact lenses, Titmus Eurocon brought a world novelty to the market. Titmus Eurocon was sold in 1982 to the Swiss group Ciba Geigy (Novartis).

In the early the 1990s, Schwind expanded its focus by adding a second area of expertise to its portfolio: the development, production, and distribution of eye lasers for vision correction, including refractive and therapeutic corneal surgery. In 1992 the first treatment of myopia with a shrink laser took place in South Korea. Seven years following this event, in 1999, the company management withdrew Schwind from the business field in service provision for ophthalmologists to specialise solely in the field of eye laser correction. At the same time, they changed their name to Schwind eye-tech-solutions.

In 2007 the company introduced a new excimer laser generation, the Schwind Amaris, which is the first and only laser system worldwide to combine all available modern refractive technologies in one system. Since then, the Schwind Amaris product family has been enhanced continuously. Today, Schwind Amaris laser systems compete successfully in a market otherwise dominated by multinational, market-listed corporations. The latest Amaris evolution features, with 1050 Hertz, the second after Optosystems Microscan (1100 Hertz) the highest available pulse repetition rate on the market of excimer lasers today.

In 2016 international private investment firm, ARDIAN, purchased a 70% stake in the company.

In 2021, Global law firm, White and Case LLP advised international private investment firm ARDIAN on the sale of Schwind to private equity company Adagia Partners. The details of the transaction were not disclosed by the parties. In December 2021, Adagia Partners completed the deal, purchasing the majority of the shares while Rolf Schwind retained a minority stake and agreement to continue in the role of CEO until the end of 2022.

== Products ==
=== Lasers ===
==== Schwind Esiris excimer laser ====
Source:

==== Schwind Amaris excimer laser ====
The Schwind Amaris laser operates at 500 pulses per second and is the first laser to use two energy levels for corneal tissue removal. Approximately 80% of the tissue is removed with high energy to speed up treatment, while the remaining tissue is removed with low energy for increased precision. This method allows for the correction of a diopter in under 2.5 seconds, reducing treatment time, particularly for patients with high levels of vision defects.

The laser is equipped with an eye tracking system that monitors eye movements 1050 times per second, adjusting the laser to ensure accuracy. At the time, it was the first laser to use a five-dimensional eye tracker, compensating for both linear and rotational eye movements during the procedure. Clinical studies indicate that patients treated with this laser achieve higher visual performance than with glasses or contact lenses, with some achieving 125% visual acuity. The Bellevue Eye Clinic in Kiel was one of the first clinics in Germany to use the laser in routine care.

==== Schwind Atos femtosecond laser ====
Source:

=== Other ===
- Passive eye tracker

=== Treatments ===
- Intrasomal Lasik and Smartsight lenticle extraction treatment
- Presby Max treatment
- The development of the corneal wavefront method to detect irregularities of the cornea

==== Trans PRK/SmartsurfACE ====
Photorefractive keratectomy (PRK) was first introduced in 1988 as one of the earliest laser refractive surgical methods. SmartSurfACE PRK is a proprietary procedure launched in 2009, which built on this foundation to create a touchless procedure to correct vision at the surface of the cornea without suction of the eye, flap, or incision. The non-invasive eye surgery technique involves the removal of the thin outer corneal layer (epithelium) through surface ablation, allowing for precise vision correction without making incisions or creating a corneal flap. By avoiding incisions or cuts into the cornea, the method reduces post-operative complications and improves corneal stability. Third party and peer-reviewed publications have since reported and proven the TransPRK efficacy. Patients have reported improved vision immediately after surgery, more than experienced with the use of glasses prior to surgery.

==== SmartPulse ====
Introduced in 2015, SmartPulse technology creates a precise 3D model of the cornea using a refined spot overlap algorithm. This pulse technology, developed in conjunction with Dr. David T.C. Lin in Vancouver, Canada, facilitates an even laser pulse distribution that positions 0.2 μm laser pulses more closely than earlier technologies. This approach provides a smooth stromal surface post-ablation. Schwind use SmartPulse technology in combination with the PRK/SmartSurfACE method to accelaerate re-epitherlialisation leading to quicker visual recovery.

== Awards ==
For its innovations, Schwind was awarded various national and international prizes since 2008, for example the German "Industriepreis 2008" in the medical technology category, the "Gusi Peace Prize 2008", the "Medical Design Excellence Award 2008" in Gold as well as the German "TOP 100 most innovative companies 2008" and "Germany Land of Ideas - Selected Landmark 2009" awards.
