= Australia's Next Top Model season 7 =

Australia's Next Top Model
- Season 7
- Judges: Sarah Murdoch; Alex Perry; Charlotte Dawson
- No. of contestants: 16
- Winner: Montana Cox
- No. of episodes: 13

Release
- Original network: Fox8
- Original release: 8 August – 25 October 2011

Season chronology
- ← Previous; Season 6 Next → Season 8

The seventh cycle of Australia's Next Top Model began airing on 8 August 2011 on Fox8.

The prizes for this cycle included a modelling contract with Chic Model Management, replacing the previous association with Priscilla's Model Management, a cash prize of $20,000 sponsored by TRESemmé, a brand new Ford Fiesta, an overseas trip to New York City to meet with NEXT Model Management, and an editorial spread along with the cover of Harper's Bazaar Australia.

The winner of the competition was 17-year-old Montana Cox from Melbourne, Victoria. This marked the final series of Australia's Next Top Model hosted by Sarah Murdoch, as she departed the show several months after the cycle's finale.

== Series summary ==
Twenty contestants were ultimately chosen out of 100 contestants from across Australia, who were selected for a casting in the first week of the competition. After the second episode, the number of contestants was reduced to sixteen, who then resided in their designated house in Sydney throughout the production period from May to August 2011.

=== Requirements ===
As with previous seasons, all contestants had to be aged 16 or older to be eligible for the show. Those auditioning were required to have a minimum height of at least 172 cm (5 ft 7 1/2 in) tall. To qualify, all applicants had to be Australian citizens residing in Australia. Additional requirements stated that contestants should not have had prior experience as a model in a national campaign within the last five years. If a contestant was represented by an agent or a manager, she had to terminate that representation prior to the competition.

=== Auditions ===
Auditions were held on 24 January in Darwin, 27 January in Melbourne, 28 January in Adelaide, 30 January in Perth, 3 and 5 February in Sydney, and on 12 February 2011 in Brisbane (delayed from 22 January due to the floods that devastated the city).

== Cast ==
=== Contestants ===
(Ages stated are at start of contest)

| Contestant | Age | Height | Hometown | Finish | Place |
|---|---|---|---|---|---|
| Cassy Phillips-Sainsbury | 17 | 174 cm (5 ft 8 1/2 in) | Bonnyrigg | Episode 3 | 16 |
| Tayah Lee-Traub | 18 | 177 cm (5 ft 9 1/2 in) | Perth | Episode 4 | 15 |
| Annaliese McCann | 16 | 177 cm (5 ft 9 1/2 in) | Shepparton | Episode 5 | 14–13 |
| Alissandra Moone | 18 | 175 cm (5 ft 9 in) | Perth | Episode 5 | 14–13 |
| Neo Yakuac | 18 | 174 cm (5 ft 8 1/2 in) | Brisbane | Episode 6 | 12–11 |
| Caroline Austin | 19 | 178 cm (5 ft 10 in) | Brisbane | Episode 6 | 12–11 |
| Yolanda Hodgson | 22 | 175 cm (5 ft 9 in) | Sydney | Episode 7 | 10 |
| Jess Bush | 19 | 175 cm (5 ft 9 in) | Brisbane | Episode 8 | 9–8 |
| Amelia Coutts | 18 | 176 cm (5 ft 9 1/2 in) | Sydney | Episode 8 | 9–8 |
| Madeline Huett | 22 | 172 cm (5 ft 7 1/2 in) | Launceston | Episode 9 | 7 |
| Izzy Vesey | 21 | 182 cm (5 ft 11 1/2 in) | Gold Coast | Episode 10 | 6–5 |
| Hazel O'Connell | 16 | 177 cm (5 ft 9 1/2 in) | Bathurst | Episode 10 | 6–5 |
| Rachel Riddell | 18 | 183 cm (6 ft 0 in) | Melbourne | Episode 11 | 4 |
| Simone Holtznagel | 17 | 175 cm (5 ft 9 in) | Wollongong | Episode 13 | 3 |
| Liz Braithwaite | 17 | 182 cm (5 ft 11 1/2 in) | Brisbane | Episode 13 | 2 |
| Montana Cox | 17 | 179 cm (5 ft 10 1/2 in) | Melbourne | Episode 13 | 1 |

=== Judges ===
- Sarah Murdoch (host)
- Alex Perry
- Charlotte Dawson

=== Other cast members ===
- Josh Flinn – style director, model mentor

== Episodes ==
| No. overall | No. in season | Title | Original release date |
|---|---|---|---|
| 63 | 1 | "100 Model Bootcamp" | 8 August 2011 |
Following an exhaustive nationwide search, 100 contestants were selected for a round of bootcamp divided into a period of three days. After group interviews with the judges, a natural photo shoot, and a runway show for Alex Perry, it was revealed that the 20 contestants that remained on day three would be flying to Paris for a final series of tasks that would determine who would move into the top model house.
| 64 | 2 | "Paris" | 15 August 2011 |
The top twenty contestants were flown to Paris and converged at the top of the Eiffel Tower, where it was revealed that they would be split into groups of five for a styling challenge at Gap, H&M, Le Dressing De Brigitte and Come on Eileen Vintage. The winners of the challenge were given the opportunity to meet supermodel Natalia Vodianova. The contestants later arrived at the Château de Vaux-le-Vicomte for a baroque couture photo shoot wearing expensive designer labels from around the world. Back in Australia, the judges chose the top sixteen contestants.: Special guest: Natalia Vodianova; Featured photographer: Jez Smith
| 65 | 3 | "Splash" | 22 August 2011 |
The top sixteen contestants moved into their new beachfront home, and headed to Nielsen Park for a runway lesson on the beach. They were later taken to a luxurious house in Coogee, where they had to walk in a bubble runway show over a pool. The first official photo shoot took place at the top model house, and the contestants were photographed wearing colorful swimwear as they were splashed with buckets of water.: Special guests: Adam Williams, Magdalena Velevska; Featured photographer: Harold David
| 66 | 4 | "Coffins" | 29 August 2011 |
The top fifteen contestants took part in a yoga lesson, and later had a challenge in the storefront window of David Jones where they had to come up with five different poses and hold each pose for three minutes. The winner of the challenge received a $500 gift card to shop at David Jones. The contestants later had to pose inside of a coffin in a shoot inspired by Lady Gaga's performance at BBC Radio 1's Big Weekend festival.: Special guests: Charlotte Dodson, Samantha Harris, Kelly Hume; Featured photographer: Jason Capobianco
| 67 | 5 | "Sunday Mag" | 5 September 2011 |
The top fourteen contestants arrived at a gymnasium for a Trapeze session, and received makeovers. They later had a simplistic pastel photo shoot, and it was revealed that the contestants with the best photos would have their shots printed in an editorial for Sunday Magazine.: Special guests: Joh Bailey, Inez Garcia; Featured photographer: Holly Blake
| 68 | 6 | "Blackmores" | 12 September 2011 |
The top twelve contestants arrived at Bondi Beach for a fitness training session, and were later taken to Lux Studios to shoot mock advertisements in which they had to sell a variety of random objects. The two winning teams received the opportunity to attend a relaunch of the Cartier boutique. The photo shoot took place at the historic grounds of Strickland House, where the models had to pose in an advertising campaign for Blackmores' line of vitamin supplements. A shocking elimination at panel saw two contestants sent home from the competition.: Special guests: Luke Hines, Rob Belgiovane, Claudia Navone; Featured photographer: Gabrielle Revere
| 69 | 7 | "Kangaroo Island" | 19 September 2011 |
The top ten contestants prepared for a flight to Kangaroo Island, and found out at Sydney Airport that all the flights to Adelaide had been cancelled due to Chilean volcanic ash. Instead, they were taken to the Sydney Dance Company, and learned about creating shapes inspired by nature. The ash cloud cleared the following day, and after arriving to Kangaroo Island, the models were split into groups for a posing challenge. They later had a tribal photo shoot at the Remarkable Rocks in Flinders Chase National Park.: Special guests: Tim Bishop; Featured photographer: Nick Leary
| 70 | 8 | "Great Gatsby" | 26 September 2011 |
The top nine contestants met Charlotte Dawson at the National Institute of Dramatic Art for an acting lesson, before taking part in an audition challenge for Telstra. They later had to pose in a 1920s vintage photo shoot inspired by The Great Gatsby with actor Lincoln Lewis.: Special guests: Anna Houston, Abe Forsythe, Lincoln Lewis; Featured photographer: Jordan Graham
| 71 | 9 | "Paintbox" | 3 October 2011 |
Sarah Murdoch visited the top seven contestants with her friend Crystal Barter to talk about breast cancer, and surprised the contestants with a visit from their loved ones. After a trip to the landfill, they arrived at the Strand Arcade for a fashion show in which they had to wear garments made of sustainable garbage for an exhibition at the Australian Museum. The winner of the challenge was given $500 to donate to a charity of her choosing. The contestants were later photographed semi-nude and covered in pink paint with male models to promote breast cancer awareness.: Special guests: Crystal Barter, Adam Williams; Featured photographer: Simon Upton
| 72 | 10 | "Joy Luxe" | 10 October 2011 |
The top six contestants went to Boxing Works for a lesson on mixed martial arts, and later auditioned for a role in Short Stack's new music video "Bang Bang Sexy". For the shoot, they were photographed at the Victoria Room wearing couture lingerie. The contestants received a shock at panel, when a double elimination caught them by surprise.: Special guests: Short Stack, Alexandra Agoston, Dan Rotinger; Featured photographer: Simon Lekias
| 73 | 11 | "Epic" | 17 October 2011 |
Charlotte Dawson briefed the top four contestants on the importance and pitfalls of social media, and introduced them to Lara Bingle for a lesson on dealing with the limelight. They were then flown to Cockatoo Island for their photo shoot, in which they had to pose as movie starlets on a crane wearing couture gowns. After a night of camping out on the island, it was revealed that the models would be attending go-sees for several high profile clients in Sydney.: Special guests: Lara Bingle, Megan Gale, Camilla Freeman, Fernando Frisoni, Camilla Franks, Ursula Hufnagl; Featured photographer: Hugh Stewart
| 74 | 12 | "Dubai" | 24 October 2011 |
Sarah Murdoch surprised the top three contestants by announcing that they would be heading overseas to Dubai for a final series of tests. After a trip around the city's markets, they arrived to Al Bastakiya for a scorching photo shoot session in which they had to wear winter clothing. They later swam with dolphins at their hotel, and ended their week with an editorial photo shoot wearing fabric in the desert. Back in Australia, the judges went over the results of the final pictures and discussed each model's potential.: Featured photographer: Georges Antoni
| 75 | 13 | "Finale" | 25 October 2011 |
After a brief recap of the series, and several red carpet entrances, the show reunited the top sixteen contestantsin an opening runway show. Afterwards, footage from the final shoot for Harper's Bazaar was shown. The final covers were then revealed, and Simone was eliminated from the competition. Following a performance from Short Stack and a retrospective look back at the finalists' journey on the show, Montana was revealed to be the seventh winner of Australia's Next Top Model.: Special guests: Edwina McCann, Claudia Navone, Short Stack; Featured photographer: Pierre Toussaint

== Results ==
| Order | Episodes | | | | | | | | | | | |
| Order | 2 (Note: Episode 2 was the second episode of casting where the top 20 was reduced to the final 16.) | 3 | 4 | 5 (Note: Episode 5 was a three way double elimination.) | 6 (Note: Episode 6 was a surprise double elimination.) | 7 (Note: In episode 7, the bottom three contestants were in danger of elimination, but only Yolanda was eliminated.) | 8 (Note: Episode 8 was a three way double elimination.) | 9 | 10 (Note: Episode 10 was a surprise double elimination.) | 11 | 13 | |
|---|---|---|---|---|---|---|---|---|---|---|---|---|
| 1 | Rachel | Yolanda | Liz | Montana | Montana | Rachel | Simone | Hazel | Montana | Montana | Montana | Montana |
| 2 | Izzy | Montana | Yolanda | Madeline | Liz | Liz | Izzy | Montana | Liz | Liz | Liz | Liz |
| 3 | Jess | Neo | Jess | Rachel | Simone | Izzy | Rachel | Liz | Simone | Simone | Simone | |
| 4 | Madeline | Izzy | Rachel | Hazel | Hazel | Hazel | Hazel | Simone | Rachel | Rachel | | |
| 5 | Caroline | Liz | Amelia | Simone | Jess | Montana | Montana | Rachel | Hazel; Izzy | | | |
| 6 | Yolanda | Alissandra | Simone | Amelia | Madeline | Madeline | Madeline | Izzy | Hazel; Izzy | | | |
| 7 | Amelia | Madeline | Montana | Caroline | Rachel | Simone | Liz | Madeline | | | | |
| 8 | Neo | Jess | Neo | Jess | Amelia | Amelia | Amelia; Jess | | | | | |
| 9 | Liz | Amelia | Madeline | Yolanda | Yolanda | Jess | Amelia; Jess | | | | | |
| 10 | Montana | Tayah | Hazel | Izzy | Izzy | Yolanda | | | | | | |
| 11 | Hazel | Simone | Annaliese | Liz | Caroline; Neo | | | | | | | |
| 12 | Alissandra | Annaliese | Caroline | Neo | Caroline; Neo | | | | | | | |
| 13 | Tayah | Caroline | Izzy | Alissandra; Annaliese | | | | | | | | |
| 14 | Annaliese | Rachel | Alissandra | Alissandra; Annaliese | | | | | | | | |
| 15 | Cassy | Hazel | Tayah | | | | | | | | | |
| 16 | Simone | Cassy | | | | | | | | | | |

The contestant was eliminated
The contestant won the competition

=== Bottom two ===
| Episode | Contestants | Eliminated |
|---|---|---|
| 3 | Cassy & Hazel | Cassy |
| 4 | Alissandra & Tayah | Tayah |
| 5 | Alissandra, Annaliese & Neo | Alissandra |
| 5 | Alissandra, Annaliese & Neo | Annaliese |
| 6 | Caroline & Neo | Caroline |
| 6 | Caroline & Neo | Neo |
| 7 | Amelia, Jess & Yolanda | Yolanda |
| 8 | Amelia, Jess & Liz | Amelia |
| 8 | Amelia, Jess & Liz | Jess |
| 9 | Izzy & Madeline | Madeline |
| 10 | Hazel & Izzy | Hazel |
| 10 | Hazel & Izzy | Izzy |
| 11 | Rachel & Simone | Rachel |
| 13 | Liz, Montana and Simone | Simone |
| 13 | Liz & Montana | Liz |

The contestant was eliminated after her first time in the bottom two/three
The contestant was eliminated after her second time in the bottom two/three
The contestant was eliminated in the final judging and placed third
The contestant was eliminated in the final judging and placed as the runner-up

=== Average call-out order ===
Casting call-out order and final two are not included.

| Rank by average | Place | Model | Call-out total | Number of call-outs | Call-out average |
|---|---|---|---|---|---|
| 1 | | Montana | 26 | 10 | 2.60 |
| 2 | | Liz | 37 | 10 | 3.70 |
| 3 | | Simone | 46 | 10 | 4.60 |
| 4 | | Rachel | 45 | 9 | 5.00 |
| 5 | 5–6 | Hazel | 47 | 8 | 5.87 |
| 6 | 7 | Madeline | 43 | 7 | 6.14 |
| 7 | 10 | Yolanda | 31 | 5 | 6.20 |
| 8 | 5–6 | Izzy | 53 | 8 | 6.62 |
| 9 | 8–9 | Jess | 41 | 6 | 6.83 |
| 10 | 8–9 | Amelia | 44 | 6 | 7.33 |
| 11 | 11–12 | Neo | 34 | 4 | 8.50 |
| 12 | 11–12 | Caroline | 43 | 4 | 10.75 |
| 13 | 13–14 | Alissandra | 33 | 3 | 11.00 |
| 14 | 13–14 | Annaliese | 36 | 3 | 12.00 |
| 15 | | Tayah | 25 | 2 | 12.50 |
| 16 | | Cassy | 16 | 1 | 16.00 |

=== Photo Shoot Guide ===
- Episode 1 Photo Shoot: Natural Beauty Shots (Casting)
- Episode 2 Photo Shoot: Couture Gowns at Chateau de Vaux-le-Vicomte (Semifinals)
- Episode 3 Photo Shoot: Swimwear with Splashing Water
- Episode 4 Photo Shoot: Posing as Lady Gaga in a Coffin
- Episode 5 Photo Shoot: Simplicity in Pastel Clothing for Sunday Magazine
- Episode 6 Photo Shoot: Blackmores Campaign on a field of Grass
- Episode 7 Photo Shoot: Tribal Wear at Kangaroo Island
- Episode 8 Photo Shoot: Great Gatsby On a Train with Lincoln Lewis
- Episode 9 Photo Shoot: Covered in Pink Body Paint for Breast Cancer Awareness
- Episode 10 Photo Shoot: Vintage Lingerie
- Episode 11 Photo Shoot: Evening dresses at Cockatoo Island on a Crane
- Episode 12 Photo Shoots: Winter Clothing In The Streets of Al Bastakiya; Wearing Gowns in the Desert
- Episode 13 Photo Shoot: Harper's Bazaar Australia Cover Shots

=== Makeovers ===
- Alissandra - Amy Adams light red shoulder length
- Annaliese - Kylie Jenner inspired chest length cut
- Caroline - Mild trimmed
- Neo - Jennifer Lawrence dark blonde and buzzed
- Amelia - Miranda Kerr dark brown weave
- Jess - Linda Evangelista inspired pixie cut and dyed platinum blonde
- Madeline - Kim Kardashian inspired angled line bob
- Hazel - Amanda Seyfried strawberry blonde shoulder length
- Izzy - Isla Fisher dark red and cut medium length due to light blonde been unable to work)
- Rachel - Rihanna inspired angled line bob and dyed dark brown
- Simone - Brigitte Nielsen light blonde and tight waves
- Liz - Cut chest length
- Montana - Melania Trump blonde

== Post–Top Model careers ==
- Cassy Phillips-Sainsbury has taken a couple of test shots and modeled for Hijab House. She retired from modeling in 2013.
- Tayah Lee-Traub signed with Chadwick Models and The Agency Models AU. She has taken a couple of test shots and walked in fashion shows of UTS Fashion, Garth Cook Resort 2013,... She has modeled for Head Studio Salon, Little Gracie The Label, Only NY FW13, 1920online AU, Sadhev India, Leith Groves, The Eden Planner UK,... and appeared on magazine editorials for Mess Poland, The Alchemist US, Kismet US #27 June 2013,... Beside modeling, Lee-Traub has appeared in music video "Ctrl Alt Delete" by Ukiyo & Ūla. She retired from modeling in 2017.
- Alissandra Moone signed with Scene Model Management and The Agency Models AU. She has modeled for Mimii Jewellery Winter 2011 and walked in fashion show for Lorna Jane. She has taken a couple of test shots and appeared on magazine editorials for Magpie Darling UK #20 January 2012, Perth Bridal Options August 2012,... Moone retired from modeling in 2016.
- Annaliese McCann mainly work as a stock model. She retired from modeling in 2017 to pursue a career as a fashion designer as she has created hew own line of clothing and wedding accessories Melbourne Creative Studio.
- Caroline Austin has worked under the name "Charlie" and signed with Dallys Models, Chic Management, Giant Management, Priscilla's Model Management, Primary Management, Ford Models in New York City, Two Management in Los Angeles, 62 Models in Auckland, 2morrow Models in Milan, Metro Models in Zurich, Born Models in Copenhagen, Modelwerk & Most Wanted Models in Hamburg. She has walked in fashion shows of Aqua Blú, Toni Matičevski SS12.13, We Are Handsome SS12.13, Camilla SS12.13, George Wu Couture, Myer SS14, One Fell Swoop SS15.16, Zhivago SS15.16, Sara Aljaism SS15.16, Asanovski SS15.16, Gail Sorronda SS15.16, Jamie Ashkar SS15.16, David Jones FW17, Giorgio Armani FW19, We Are Kindred Resort 2022, Mariam Seddiq,... and appeared on magazine cover and editorials for Grazia International, Marie Claire, Women's Weekly February 2012, It Fashion Italia April 2012, Culture August–September 2012, Kismet US #25 April 2013, Émergent UK June 2013, Linea Intima Italia July 2013, C-Heads February 2016, World Bride US Spring 2016, Fotografare Italia August 2016, Family Circle US September 2016, Eastern Suburbs Life December 2016, Cosmopolitan December 2016, Fitness First April 2017, British Vogue February 2018, Vogue March 2018, Sydney Confidential November 2018, OK! December 2019, Mod US September 2020, AFR February 2021,... She has taken a couple of test shots and modeled for many brands such as Guess, Triumph International, Spanx, Franklin & Marshall Italia, Yoox Italia, Ally Fashion, Billabong, Bras N Things, EziBuy, Samsonite Italia, Harmont & Blaine Italia, Champion Italia, Roberto Cavalli, Frederick's of Hollywood US, Wrangler, M.J. Bale, Peter Alexander, Louenhide, Giovanni Fabiani, Riccovero Norway, Leonisa AU, Sunnylife AU, Heaven Swim, Astrid Montague, Moira Hughes Couture, Heineken,...
- Neo Yakuac signed with Chic Management. She has taken a couple of test shots and appeared on magazine editorials for Women's Weekly February 2012. She has modeled for Michael Hill Jeweller, Becca Cosmetics, Bow & Arrow SS12,... Yakuac retired from modeling in 2015.
- Yolanda Hodgson signed with Scoop Model Management. She has taken a couple of test shots and walked in fashion show for Dubbo SS17. She has modeled for Mary & Me, Ace Of Something AU,... and appeared on magazine cover and editorials for Women's Fitness September 2012, Weight Watchers October 2012, Institute UK October 2012, Pregnancy & Birth May–June 2013, Marie Claire May 2019,... Beside modeling, Hodgson has appeared in music video "On Top" by Johnny Ruffo. She retired from modeling in 2019.
- Amelia Coutts signed with Chic Management. She has modeled for Grandma Takes A Trip AU and appeared on magazine editorials for Madison June 2012. She has taken a couple of test shots and walked in fashion shows of Gail Sorronda SS12.13, Toni Matičevski SS12.13,... Coutts retired from modeling in 2015.
- Jess Bush signed with Dallys Models, Scoop Model Management and The Agency Models AU. She has taken a couple of test shot and walked in fashion show for Zimmermann. She has appeared on magazine editorials for Women's Weekly February 2012, Harper's Bazaar April 2013, Hello May May 2014, TV Week September 2019, Flaunt US June 2022, Vanity Fair US June 2022,... and modeled for Billabong, Angle Diamond Dot, Wonders Cease Clothing, Identity Cut & Color, Childe Eyewear, Marysia, Wah-Wah AU, KFC, Dulux, Telstra,... Beside modeling, Bush has appeared in music video "Shut Up & Kiss Me" by Reece Mastin. In 2015, she retired from modeling and begin pursuing an artist and acting career, which she has appeared on Fresh Blood, Home and Away, Playing for Keeps, Skinford: Chapter Two, The Secret Daughter, Les Norton, Halifax: Retribution, Star Trek: Strange New Worlds,...
- Madeline Huett signed with London Management Group. She has taken a couple of test shots and modeled for Soles Shoes AU SS13, Marcus Edward Concept Salons, Alter Ego Italy FW13.14, Kallure Jewellery,... She has appeared on magazine editorials for Monster Children March 2012, Yen July 2013, Fashion Journal August 2013, OK! August 2013, Modern Hair + Beauty January 2014, Label Fall 2014,... Huett retired from modeling in 2016.
- Hazel O'Connell has worked under her real name "Abbey" and signed with Chic Management and 1085 Artist Management in Cape Town. She has modeled for Tigerlily Swimwear, Dion Lee SS12.13, Thursday Sunday Fashion SS13, Gasperre Cashmere SS13, Secret South Clothing SS12.13, Longina Phillips Designs, Cleonie Swim, Cue Summer 2013,... and appeared on magazine cover and editorials for InStyle, Girlfriend, Yen, The Daily Telegraph April 2012, Russh #45 April–May 2012, Oyster May 2012, Madison July 2012,... She has taken a couple of test shots and walked in fashion shows of Asos, Life With Bird SS12.13, Gail Sorronda SS12.13, Camilla SS12.13, Lisa Ho SS12.13, Ellery SS12.13, Christopher Esber SS12.13, We Are Handsome SS13.14,... O'Connell retired from modeling in 2015.
- Izzy Vesey signed with Chic Management, Emg Models, Six Wolves Agency, Ava Model Management, Peas Model Management in Beijing and New Icon Model Management in Mexico City. She has taken a couple of test shots and walked in fashion shows of MGPIN China FW13.14, G'Vill Mark Cheung Shoes FW13.14, Trozmer Centro Universitario, Nixi Killick,... She has modeled for Kotex, Wheels & Dollbaby, Trash Monkey AU, Elysium Couture AU, Marie Hairdesigns, My Little Rockabilly, Shoes Of Prey, Sterling Hairdressing, Kitty Grace Dress, Seduce Clothing, Mad About Hue Designs Mexico, Quattro Tizi Mexico, Jorge Duque Vélez, Ignazio Muñoz FW14, Begitta Bridal, Famous Footwear AU FW15, Soulan Zee, Nixi Killick, Vodafone,... and appeared on magazine cover and editorials for mX, Elle Mexico, Nylon Mexico, Reforma Moda! Mexico, Deadbeat, Dark Beauty US, The Atlas US, Pánico Mexico, Crom Japan, OK! October 2011, Get It October 2011, Dolly November 2011, Women's Weekly February 2012, Faijee China May 2013, Freque US #3 October 2013, Gold Coast Eye March 2014, Time Out Mexico April 2014, Teeth US April 2014, Tenebrous US #5 April 2014, Fashion Observer June 2014, Revista Tú Mexico June 2014, Rookie US July 2014, Stonefoxx Mexico November 2014, Fashion Weekly #25 February 2015, Shustring US March–April 2015, Scorpio Jin US December 2015,... Beside modeling, Vesey has appeared in music video "Savage Sunday" by Being Jane Lane. She retired from modeling in 2020.
- Rachel Riddell signed with Vivien's Model Management. She walked in fashion shows for several luxury designers. She has appeared on magazine editorials for Herald Sun and Elle Australia. Riddell is also one of the models on Project Runway Australia 2012. She retired from modeling in 2013.
- Simone Holtznagel signed with Chic Management, Scoop Model Management, Munich Models in Munich, Premier Model Management in London, New Icon Model Management in Mexico City, Two Management in Los Angeles and Elite Model Management in Miami & New York City. She has taken a couple of test shots and walked in fashion shows of Guess, Marciano FW17, Mariam Seddiq,... She has modeled for Guess US, Marciano US, Peter Alexander, ShoeDazzle US, Wheels & Dollbaby, Bras N Things, Cocolatte FW11, Planet Blue Clothing US Spring 2013, Aqua Blú AU, Pavlovich Hair, NCLA Beauty US, Elegantly Scant Lingerie, A. Ché Swimwear US, Sun Kitten Swimwear US, Bare Necessities Spring 2016, Kitty Chen Couture, Monday Swimwear, Honey Birdette, Sunseeker Swim, Une Piece Swimwear, Étté Resort, De Lorenzo Haircare SS24, Wear Nala, Heidi & Hart, Leah Da Glória, Hard Rock Cafe US,... and appeared on magazine cover and editorials for Who, Stellar, Zephyr #1 February 2012, Fashion Gone Rogue April 2012, Essential Marbella #154 April 2012, Heart Beauty #2 Fall 2013, OK! August 2013, The Sunday Telegraph June 2014, Fashion Affair US May 2015, Men's Style #63 Fall 2015, Playboy US October 2015, Prestige Hong Kong October 2015, The Society Diaries US January–February 2016, Hello May June 2014, Arizona Foothills US May 2015, Cosmopolitan Bride July 2015, The Daily Telegraph February 2018, Sands Style US Fall 2019, InStyle December 2021, Pump US February 2022, Sunday Times Perth April 2022, Harper's Bazaar January 2025,... Beside modeling, Holtznagel has also competed on I'm a Celebrity...Get Me Out of Here! 2018, SAS Australia: Who Dares Wins 2022,...
- Liz Braithwaite signed with Chic Management, Dallys Models, London Management Group and Bareface Model Agency in Dubai. She has taken a couple of test shots and appeared on magazine cover and editorials for Women's Weekly February 2012, Cove #30 April–May 2012, mX June 2012, North Coast Weddings #8 SS12.13, Brisbane News #928 April 2013, Qweekend June 2013, Savoir Flair UAE July 2013, Harper's Bazaar Arabia July 2013, Astound January 2016,... She has modeled for Michael Hill Jeweller, Swarovski, Sacha Drake, Jade Dockary Australia SS13, Bleach Dubai UAE FW13, By Symphony UAE FW13, Brands Exclusive AU, Alpha-H Skincare, Your Closet AU, Dubai Mall UAE,... and walked in fashion shows of Toni Matičevski, David Jones, Westfield Group, Camilla With Love, Chiquita Searle, George Wu Couture SS13, Jordanna Regan Couture SS13, Lisa Ho SS13, MXM Couture SS13, Paul Hunt Design SS13, Susan Rep SS13, Threadbare AU SS13, Trelise Cooper SS13, Carla Zampatti SS13.14, Haryono Setiadi SS13.14, Lillian Khallouf, Natalie Rolt, Paolo Sebastian, Lala Bazaar, Myer SS14, Bondi Bathers SS15.16, Ixiah The Label SS15.16, Thomas Lazar, Wild Pony Swimwear,... Braithwaite retired from modeling in 2018.
- Montana Cox has collected her prizes and signed with Chic Management. She is also signed with IMG Models, Seeds Management in Berlin, Uno Models in Barcelona, Unique Models in Copenhagen, Stockholmsgruppen Models in Stockholm and Two Management in Los Angeles. She has taken a couple of test shots and modeled for many famous brands such as Lanvin, Zara Home, Betts For Her, David Jones, Peter Alexander, Collette Dinnigan, Camilla and Marc, Ksubi, Lover, Elyse Walker, Carla Zampatti, Club Monaco, Nasty Gal, Toni Matičevski, Free People, Francesco Scognamiglio, Cotton On Group, Kookaï, Witchery, Urban Outfitters, Sabba, Yeojin Bae, Anine Bing, Josh Goot, Globus, Etro Italia, Bendon Lingerie, Fella Swim, Saint Valentine Jewellery, Made With Love Bridal,... Cox has appeared on many magazine cover and editorials including Vogue, Grazia, Harper's Bazaar, Russh, OK!, Elle, Marie Claire, InStyle, Marie Claire Spain, Vogue Italia, Miss Vogue, Nylon, Schön! UK, Vogue Japan, Marie Claire US, Harper's Bazaar Singapore, Elle Slovenia, Hamptons US, Glamour Italia, Tatler UK, Who, The Age, Interview, The Sunday Telegraph, The Sunday Mail,... and walked in fashion show for big names like Thierry Mugler, Christian Dior, Lanvin, Chanel, Alexis Mabille, Genny, Calvin Klein, David Jones, Romance Was Born, Ksubi, Camilla and Marc, Lisa Ho, Cue, Carla Zampatti, Etro, Bottega Veneta, Emilio Pucci, Felipe Oliveira Baptista, Cacharel, Kenzo, Sacai, Vanessa Bruno, Toni Matičevski, Oscar de la Renta, Charles Frederick Worth, Elie Saab, Valentino, See By Chloé, Bernard Chandran, Antonio Berardi, Alviero Martini, Rocco Barocco, Antonio Marras, Laura Biagiotti, Dsquared2, Vionnet, Rabih Kayrouz, Tom Ford, Shiatzy Chen, Zimmermann, Kenneth Cole, Givenchy, Stella McCartney, Philipp Plein, Michael Lo Sordo, Josh Goot, P.E Nation, Mariam Seddiq, Haluminous, Alix Higgins,... Beside modeling, she is also the ambassador for Neutrogena and done an acting role of Neighbours. In October 2015, she was ranked by Cosmopolitan as one of the most successful contestants of the Top Model franchise.

== Controversy ==
There was some controversy surrounding the show following comments made by Alex Perry regarding the body of one of the contestants. 18-year-old Alissandra Moone from Perth was criticised by Perry, who compared her body to "overstuffed luggage" after seeing one of her photos in the fourth episode of the series. Fans of the show immediately took to social media after the episode aired to express their outrage, to which Perry replied that he had been referring to Moone's posing skills in a confined space, and not her body. The model was ultimately eliminated the following episode, in which she'd been unable to fit into a size 10 dress for a photo shoot and had to have her photo taken as a close-up. During the episode's deliberation, Perry stated that he wasn't looking for "Australia's next top head". Perry went on to explain, "As a model, no matter what environment you're shooting in, you need to be able to make it work, and she didn't. In regards to her elimination, models need to be able to fit into sample size dresses. She was given a standard size 10 dress to wear and could not fit into it."

When questioned over Perry's comments, Moone stated "It's a very bad message to be sending to young girls who watch the show. It's harsh. It's stupid. And it's out of touch. I understand it's a reality of the industry but this is a TV show and they should have a responsibility to censor that kind of thing. I know this has happened to other girls in the past but I was shocked when he said I was too fat. I'm only a size eight. There's going to be a lot of young girls watching this who are bigger than me, and how's this going to make them feel? I understand it's probably a reality of the industry but no one likes to be told they look fat - regardless of what job you are in, I have never thought of myself as fat. I am a health freak. I go to the gym and eat well."

There was also some backfire from animal rights group PETA over the prominent use of animal fur in one of the photo shoots of the series. Foxtel defended the shoot, with a spokeswoman explaining that it had been inspired by Native American culture. The representative stated "It is a trend and idea borrowed from a past culture. Foxtel, ANTM producers, host (Sarah Murdoch) and the judges in no way condone the ongoing practice of producing fashion items using real fur." Prior to this, the show had already met criticism over its use of fur in a shoot for the previous cycle.
