= Montana Cox =

Australian model (born 1993)

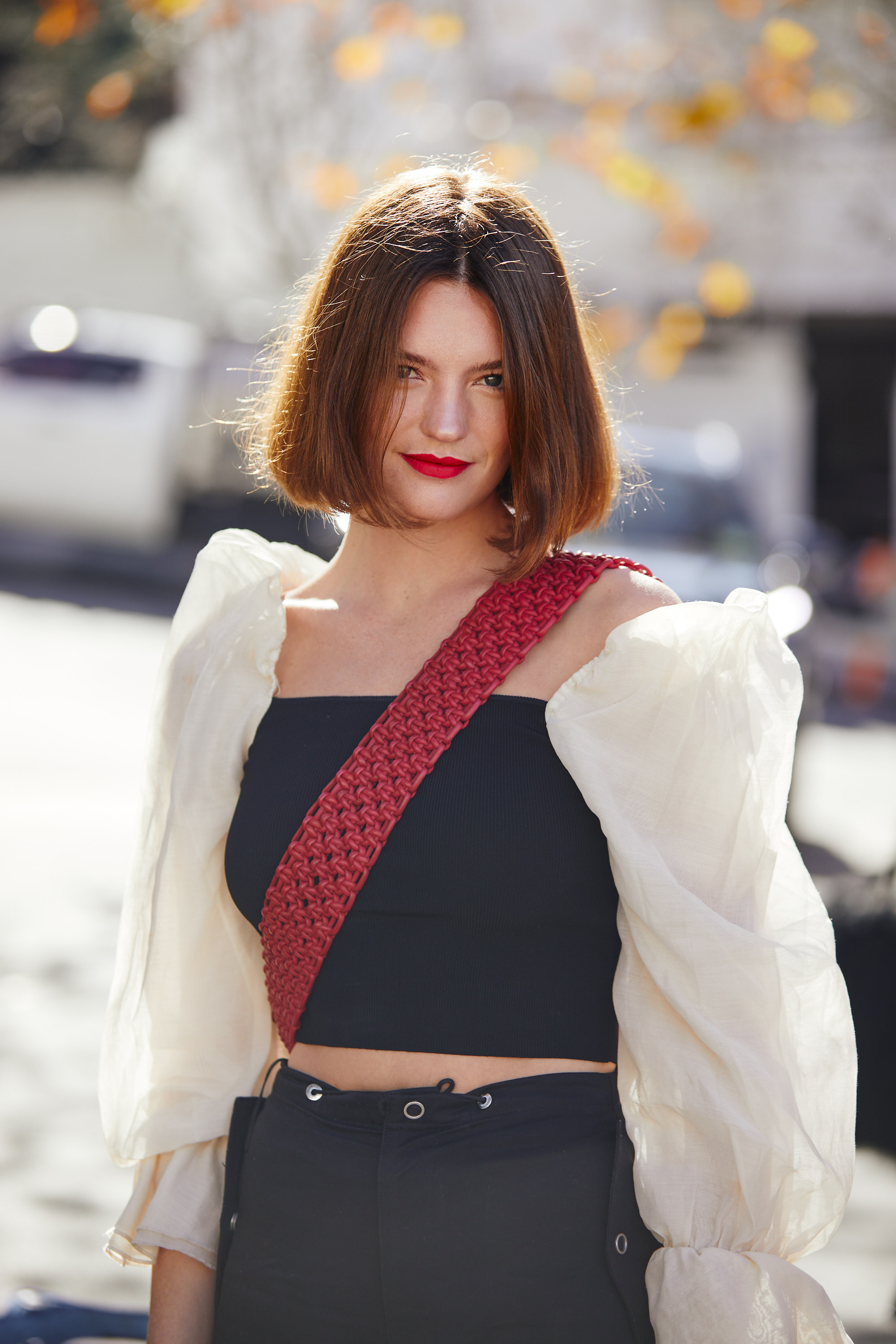
- Montana Cox at Australian Fashion Week 2021
- Born: Montana Cox; 2 September 1993 (age 33); Melbourne, Victoria, Australia
- Occupation: Model
- Years active: 2011–present
- Modeling information
- Height: 5 ft 10 1/2 in (179 cm)
- Hair color: Brown
- Eye color: Blue
- Agency: IMG Models (Worldwide); Uno Models (Barcelona); Seeds Management GmbH (Berlin); UNIQUE DENMARK (Copenhagen); Stockholmsgruppen (Stockholm)

Montana Cox (born 2 September 1993) is an Australian model, best known for being the winner of cycle 7 of Australia's Next Top Model.

== Australia's Next Top Model ==
Cox was announced the winner of Australia's Next Top Model, Cycle 7 at the Sydney Opera House on 25 October 2011, defeating Liz Braithwaite and Simone Holtznagel in the final. She is the second winner hailing from Victoria, with the previous Victorian winner being Alice Burdeu of Cycle 3.

In episode 1, Cox was singled out for her potential in the natural beauty photo shoot. She made it into the top 20 and travelled to Paris, France where photographer Jez Smith stated, "the face is just so beautiful". In episodes 5 and 6, Cox was declared a frontrunner after being the first contestant to gain two consecutive first call-outs.

In episode 9, Cox became a contender again after photographer Simon Upton stated, "I was really impressed with Montana. She is the one to beat in this competition". In episode 10, Cox gained her third first call-out for her vintage lingerie photo shoot. In episode 11, Cox won the go-see challenge after designer Fernando Frisoni stated, "I would book her with my eyes closed. I'd consider her opening my show". In the same episode, she was the first contestant through to the finale at the Sydney Opera House. In episode 12, the top three flew to Dubai, United Arab Emirates where they participated in two high-fashion photo shoots.

During the final judging, Sarah Murdoch, Charlotte Dawson and Antoni gave their verdict that Cox should be the winner, with Murdoch calling her "a supermodel in the making." In episode 13, designer Alex Perry likened her to Cindy Crawford and stated "she is the caliber of girl you would see in an international fashion magazine". After winning, Harper's Bazaar Australia editor Edwina McCann stated Cox was, "the greatest discovery for Australia's Next Top Model or any Next Top Model series." Cox is the first winner of the show with five first call-outs, is the second winner of the show to have never made a bottom two appearance and is also the first winner of the show to have never made a bottom three appearance.

== Career ==
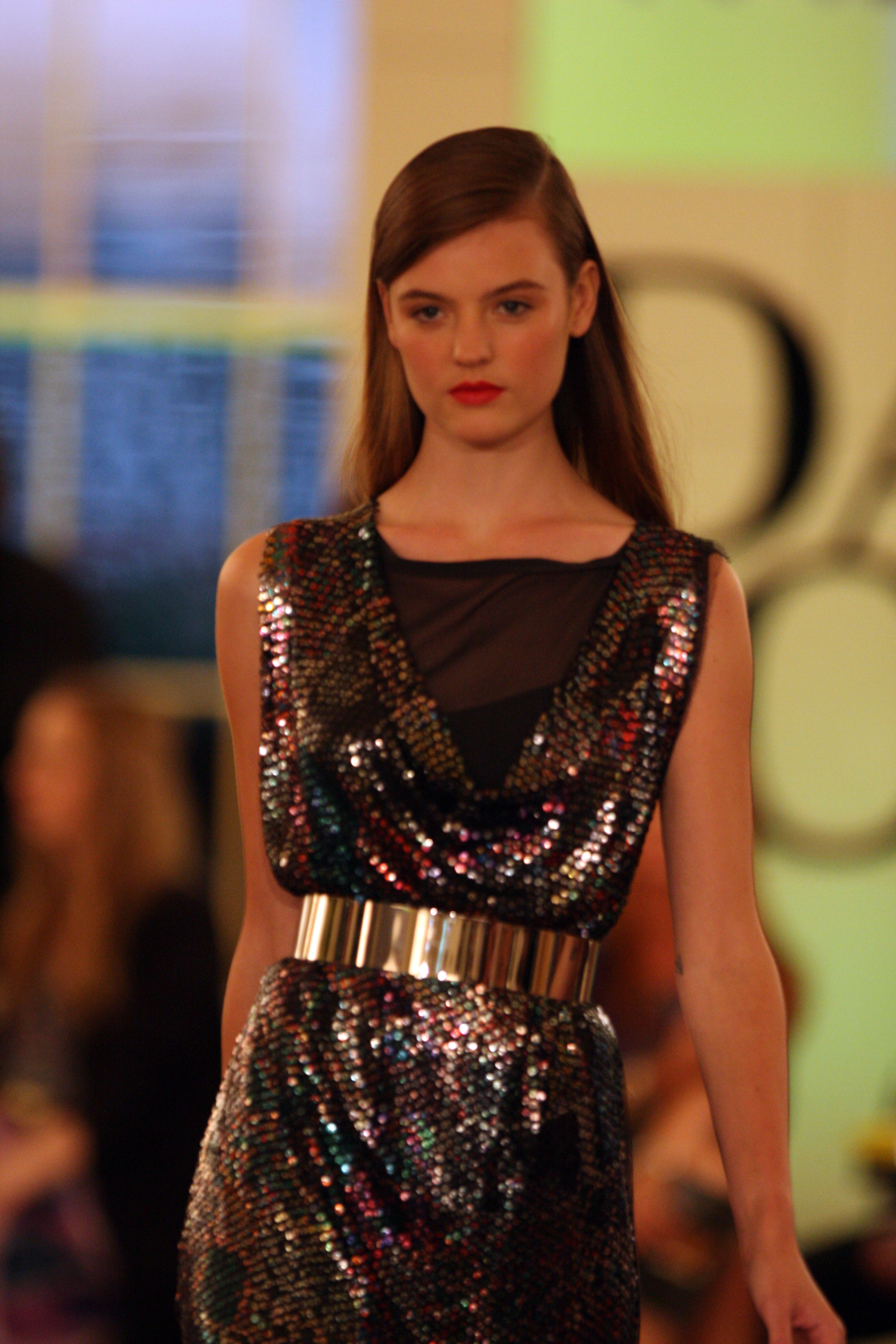
Cox at the David Jones Autumn Winter Launch in Sydney, Australia

As the winner, Cox appeared on the cover of Harper's Bazaar Australia, as well as an eight-page spread in the magazine. Her other prizes included a modelling contract with Chic Model Management, twenty thousand dollars in cash, a Ford Fiesta and an overseas trip to New York City to meet with NEXT Model Management.

Cox has since gone on to be one of the celebrity faces of FOXTEL. It was also announced that Cox would appear in the campaign for David Jones department stores for the 2012 Autumn/Winter collection alongside models Miranda Kerr and Samantha Harris. Cox has also appeared in campaigns for Betts Shoes, Lovisa, Witchery's A/W 2012 campaign and Maurie and Eve Winter 2012 campaign.

In February 2012, she signed with IMG Models in Paris, New York, Milan, and London. Subsequently, Cox made her runway debut at Milan Fashion Week Fall 2012, walking for a total of 5 shows which included Aquilano Rimondi, Bottega Veneta, Emilio Pucci, Etro and Jo No Fui.

In April 2012, she made her Australian Fashion Week debut walking for Carla Zampatti, Flannel, Manning Cartell, Ksubi, Toni Matičevski, Magdalena Veleveska, Jayson Brusdon, Camilla Franks, Lisa Ho, Ellery, WatsonxWatson, as well as opening Life with Bird and Ginger & Smart and closing Romance Was Born and Gary Bigeni. In May 2012, Cox walked for Chanel's 2013 Cruise presentation in Versailles.

In June 2012, Cox appeared in a campaign for Pink Lou Lou and editorials for Madison Magazine and Vogue Australia. During Resort 2013, Cox modelled for Chanel, Dior, Oscar De La Renta, Lanvin and Bassike In July 2012, Cox made her debut at the Fall/Winter Haute Couture Fashion Week 12/13 in Paris. Cox walked for Elie Saab, Alexis Mabille, Valentino and Worth. Cox appeared in Spring/Summer 2012 campaigns for Dion Lee and David Jones and was featured in issue 47 of Russh magazine.

In August 2012, Cox was featured in Vogue Australia, for the 3rd time as well as campaigns for Colette by Colette Dinnigan, LIFEwithBIRD's 10th anniversary show and the Spring/Summer look book for Gary Bigeni.

In September 2012, Cox was featured for the 4th time in Australian Vogue Australia as well as Vogue Italia in a campaign for Valentino Haute Couture. Cox returned to the runway for the debut of David Jones' Spring/Summer launch alongside Miranda Kerr and Samantha Harris. Due to this, Cox missed New York Fashion Week but appeared at London Fashion Week Spring RTW 2013 for Antonio Berardi, Bernard Chandran, Willow, Dion Lee, Jean-Pierre Braganza and opened for Felder Felder. At Milan Fashion Week Spring RTW 2013, Cox walked for 9 shows including DSquared2, Alviero Martini 1A Classe, Roccobarocco, Les Copains, Antonio Marras, Genny, Maurizio Pecoraro and Laura Biagiotti. At Paris Fashion Week Spring RTW 2013, Cox walked for Chanel, Tom Ford, Alexis Mabille, Mugler, Carven, Vionnet, AF Vandervorst, Shiatzy Chen and Maison Rabih Kayrouz by Rabih Kayrouz.

In February 2014, Cox walked as a Givenchy exclusive at Paris Fashion Week Fall 2014. In October 2015, Cox was ranked by Cosmopolitan as one of the most successful contestants of the Top Model franchise. Cox joined the cast of Neighbours in 2021 for a stint as Britney Barnes, until her character was killed off the following year.

== Personal life ==
Cox was house captain of the Nillumbik house at Eltham College, and finished year twelve in 2011. She attended Warrandyte Primary School and graduated 2005. Her hobbies include netball, basketball, running and going to the gym. Her father, Darryl Cox, is a former professional Australian rules footballer, and her younger brother Nikolas is a current player for Essendon.

Preceded by Amanda Ware	Australia's Next Top Model winner Cycle 7 (2011)	Succeeded by Melissa Juratowitch
