= Simone Holtznagel =

Australian model (born 1993)

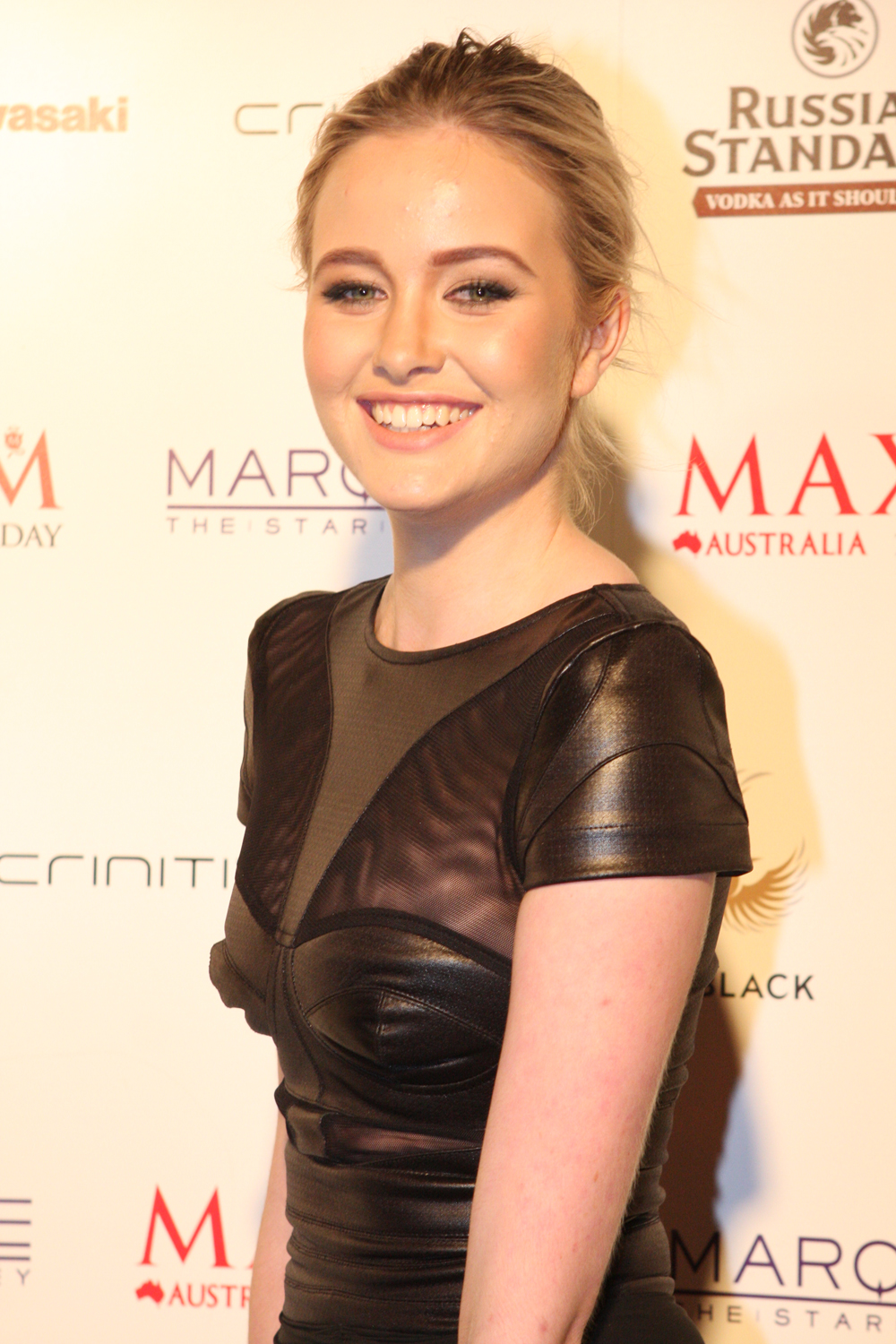
- Holtznagel in 2012
- Born: 12 July 1993 (age 33); Wollongong, New South Wales, Australia
- Occupation: Model
- Years active: 2011–present
- Children: 1
- Modeling information
- Height: 5 ft 9 1/2 in (177 cm)
- Hair color: Blonde
- Eye color: Green
- Agency: Chic Management; Two Management; Elite Miami; Elite NYC; Munich Models

Simone Holtznagel (born 12 July 1993) is an Australian fashion model, known for her appearance on the seventh season of Australia's Next Top Model, where she became the last contestant eliminated. She has since appeared in various campaigns for brands such as Guess and Bras N Things. In addition to modelling, Holtznagel has appeared on I'm a Celebrity...Get Me Out of Here! and SAS Australia: Who Dares Wins.

== Early life ==
Holtznagel is from Corrimal, Wollongong, where she lived with her mother and sisters. Growing up, she often spent time on her grandparents' farm in Nowra. Holtznagel's sister Madeline is also a model. Madeline is the partner of Justin Hemmes.

== Career ==
In 2011, Holtznagel auditioned for and was cast on the reality series Australia's Next Top Model. On 25 October 2011, Holtznagel became the last contestant eliminated to winner Montana Cox in the live finale held at the Sydney Opera House. Following her appearance on Australia's Next Top Model, Holtznagel was spotted on Instagram by Paul Marciano, the co-founder of Guess. Along with fellow models Natalie Pack and Danielle Knudson, Holtznagel shot an advertisement campaign for the brand. They also took part in the Gumball 3000 rally. Not long after she moved to the United States, Holtznagel was chosen to be the face of Australian lingerie brand Elegantly Scant's Pink Ladies Campaign in 2014. Holtznagel has also featured in campaigns for Bras N Things.

In 2015, she starred alongside male model Gil Soares for a Men's Fashion Post shoot entitled American Denim. That same year, she appeared on the cover of Playboy magazine for its October college issue. She had previously turned down an offer to become a Playboy Playmate. In 2021, Holtznagel appeared in a campaign for lingerie brand Honey Birdette.

In January 2018, Holtznagel was revealed as a celebrity contestant on the fourth season of the Australian version of I'm a Celebrity...Get Me Out of Here!. She appeared on First Dates Australia on Seven Network in 2020.

In February 2022, Holtznagel was one of seventeen contestants on SAS Australia: Who Dares Wins. Holtznagel joked that she signed up in the hope that she would get to go somewhere new after being at home for two years because of the COVID-19 lockdown, before realising that the series was filmed in her home suburb of Wollongong.

== Personal life ==
Throughout her time on Australia's Next Top Model, Holtznagel formed a close friend and mentorship with model and media personality Charlotte Dawson. They attended numerous fashion events together. Following Dawson's death in 2014, Holtznagel had to identify her body, as Dawson's family were in New Zealand.

Holtznagel has been in a relationship with personal trainer Jono Castano since 2022. On 12 October 2023, she announced that she was expecting their first child together, and their daughter was born on 31 March 2024.
