= Dion Lee =

Australian fashion designer (born 1985)

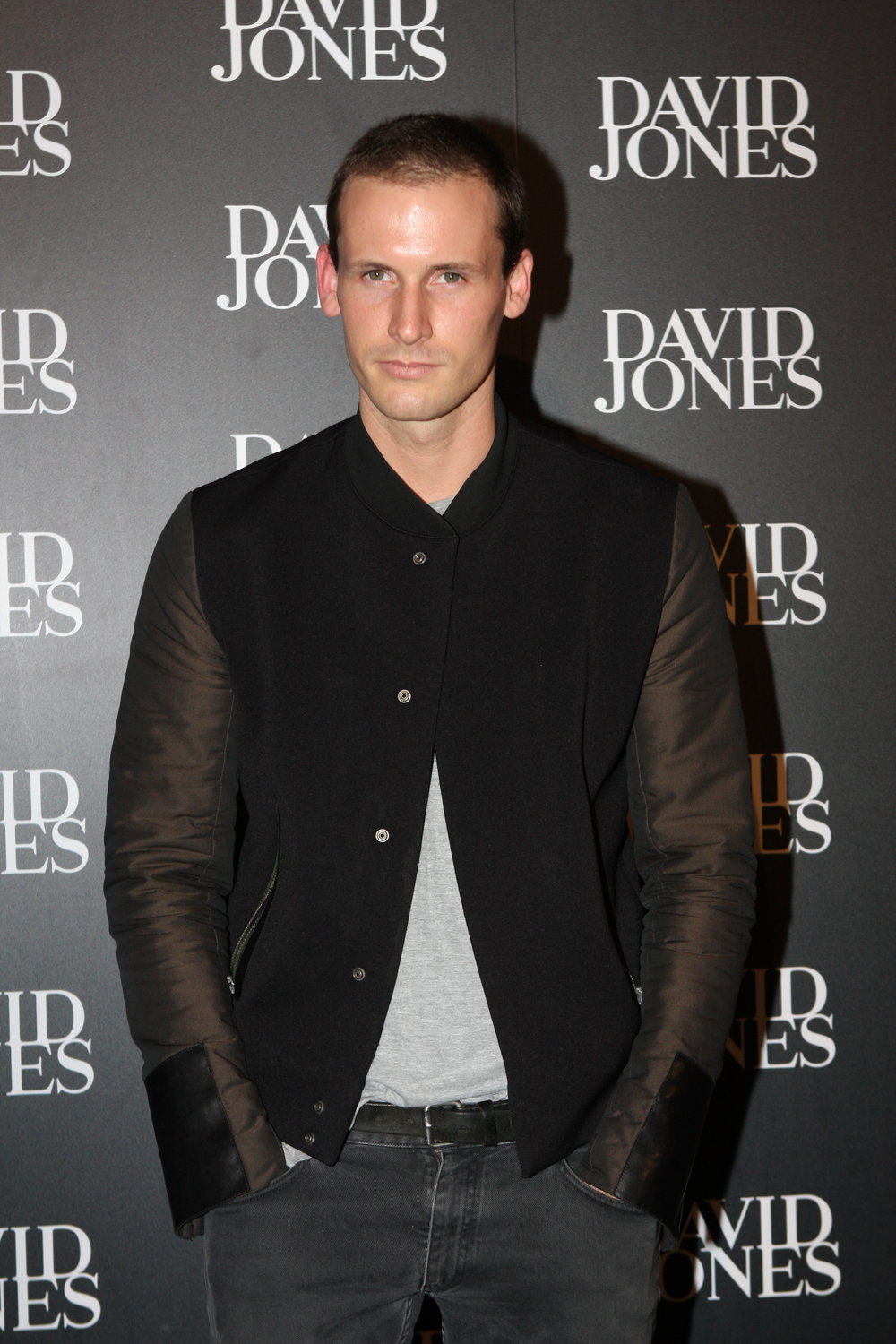
- Lee in 2012
- Born: October 2, 1985 (age 41)
- Citizenship: Australian
- Occupation: Fashion designer

Dion Lee (born 2 October 1985) is an Australian fashion designer. His eponymous brand was established in 2009.

== Early life and education ==
Lee attended the Newtown School of Performing Arts for high school. It was there that he got his first sewing machine and began making clothing for friends. He would find vintage clothing, deconstruct it, and then refashion it to his friends' liking.

Lee graduated from the TAFE NSW Fashion Design Studio in 2008. While at university, he worked at the boutique Robby Ingham in Paddington. He tailored and examined the inner workings of designers like Comme des Garçons, Jil Sander and Maison Martin Margiela.

== Work ==
Lee debuted his first collection in 2009 at Australian Fashion Week.

One year later he became the first designer to stage a runway presentation at the Sydney Opera House. The presentation included sculptural-like contouring of the female form through ‘woven structures.' These structures were tangled cords of pleated fabric in light blue tones that referenced the house’s sails. These early works are emblematic of the designer's signature subdued sexuality and sleek futurism.

In 2011, Lee collaborated with the Australian retail chain Cue and announced a partnership with the retailer two years later. As of 2016, Cue was a majority shareholder in Dion Lee.

In September 2012, Lee showed at London Fashion Week for the second time and participated as a finalist in the International Woolmark Prize the following year.

Lee has presented regularly at New York Fashion Week since 2013. His Fall 2016 show was declared by American Vogue a major success for showcasing voluminous shapes and embellished fabrics, including those with Swarovski crystals.

In October 2018, the Duchess of Sussex Meghan Markle caused the Dion Lee website to crash when she was seen in Melbourne wearing one of their custom dresses.

For his Spring/Summer 2020 presentation, the designer collaborated with Fleet Ilya, a London-based luxury leather-goods label.

In 2023, Lee presented a show that took inspiration from shredding: “snake, serpent, scale, reptile, shedding, unraveling, ouroboros, etc.” Pieces had diamond hardware with 'scale eyeleting' dressed up classic harnessing and surface treatments. Elsewhere, 'reptile skins' were etched into leather boots and oversized accessories such as opaque puffers, cut like corsets and styled with low-waisted pants that gave the appearance of deconstructed and battered club wear.

In May 2024, the Dion Lee brand entered voluntary administration. At the time, it had six stores in Australia and one in the US. In August 2024, it was reported that the company had failed to find a buyer and would be wound up. It is estimated that Australian fashion label Dion Lee's total liabilities were just over $35 million following a recent review by administrators

Lee has listed the weather radar, labyrinths, the Zero movement by Heinz Mack, Günther Uecker and Otto Piene as well as architecture by Tadao Ando as various sources of inspiration.

== Awards ==
- 2010 – Winner of the Woolmark Designer Award at Melbourne Fashion Festival
- 2010 – Winner of the Qantas Spirit of Youth Award in Fashion Design
- 2013 – Participation in the first International Woolmark Prize, representing Australia
- 2013 – Winner of the Prix de Marie Claire Award – Best Australian Fashion Designer
- 2013 – Winner of GQ Man of the Year – Best Designer
- 2017 – Confirmed as Designer of the new Sydney Opera House uniforms
- 2017 – Winner of the Australian Fashion Laureate
