= Donatella Girombelli =

Donatella Girombelli is an Italian fashion executive and entrepreneur. She was the head of the Italian ready-to-wear company Genny.
