= Zimmermann (fashion label) =

Australian fashion label

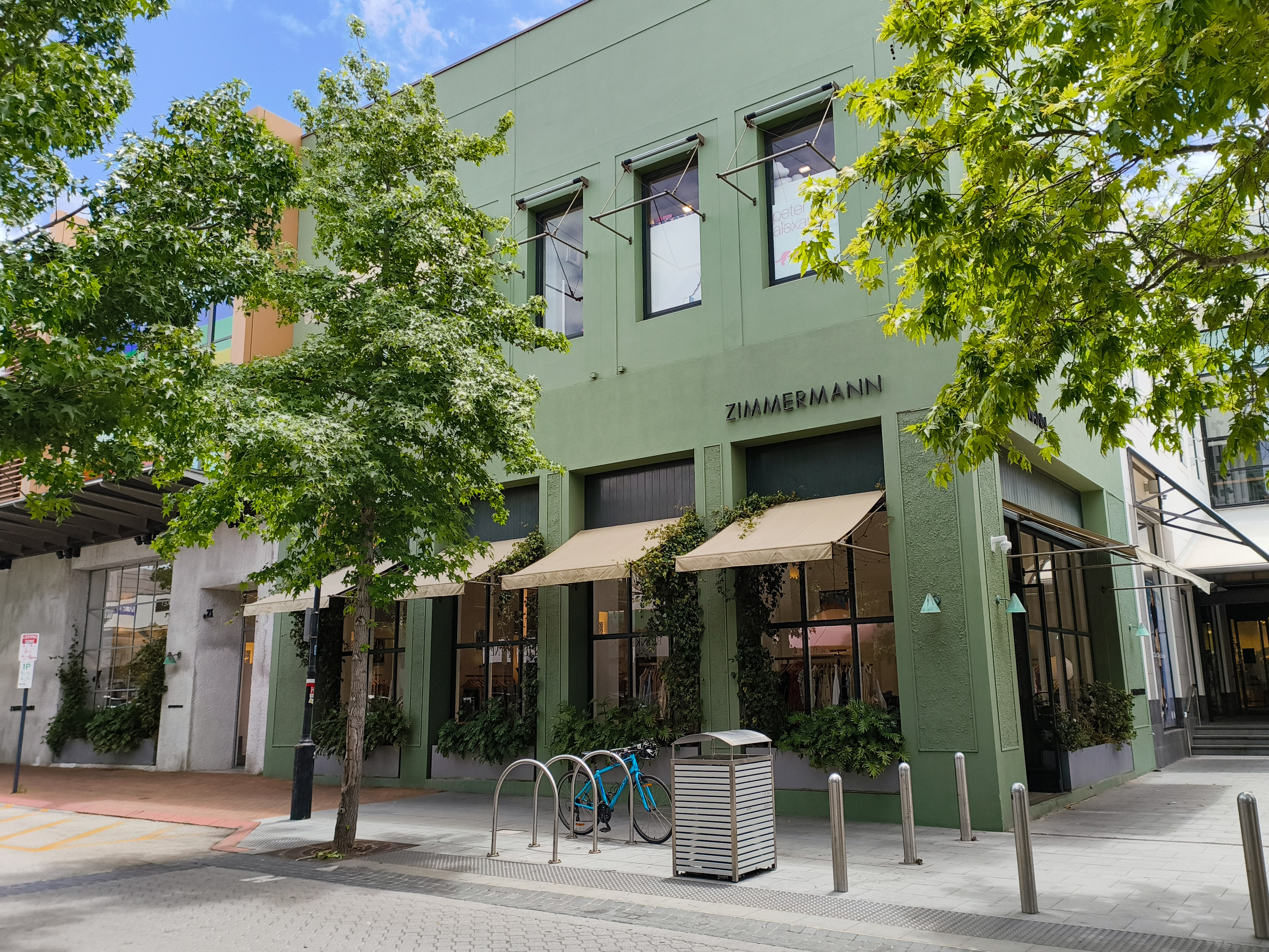
- Zimmermann store in Claremont, Western Australia
- Type: Private
- Industry: Fashion
- Founded: 1991; 35 years ago
- Founder: Nicky Zimmermann; Simone Zimmermann
- Headquarters: Sydney, New South Wales, Australia
- Area served: Worldwide
- Products: Clothing, fashion accessories, swimwear
- Website: zimmermann.com

Zimmermann is an Australian fashion label known for its feminine designs and distinctive use of prints, embroidery, and intricate detailing. The label was founded by sisters Nicky and Simone Zimmermann in 1991. Zimmermann is majority owned by Advent International and has over 58 stores globally.

== History ==
Sisters Nicky and Simone Zimmermann founded the label in 1991, opening their first store in 1992. Nicky Zimmermann attended design school in East Sydney, where she began designing garments from her parents' garage and selling them at Paddington markets, where she was able to see first-hand how women responded to her designs. Her sister, Simone, joined the business later alongside Nicky in 1991.

Zimmermann presents their ready-to-wear collections each year in Australia and the US at New York Fashion Week. and made their debut in France at Paris Fashion Week in 2022. In the following years, the Zimmermann label extended to swim separates, kids, and accessories. After the expansion, Zimmermann started making ready-to-wear collections available outside of Australia. In 2008, Zimmermann also launched its online boutique at zimmermann.com.

In March 2016, American private equity firm General Atlantic purchased a minority stake in the label. In December 2020, Italian private equity firm Style Capital acquired a 70 per cent stake in Zimmermann, including purchasing General Atlantic's stake. The Zimmermann family retained 30 per cent ownership of the brand.

In August 2023, American private equity firm Advent International acquired a majority stake in Zimmermann in a deal valuing the company between A$1.5–1.75 billion. Style Capital retained a minority stake.

== Collections ==
Since its launch in the US in 2011, Zimmermann has followed a Northern Hemisphere calendar for collection releases. This includes Spring/Summer, Fall and Resort collections for Ready to Wear, and Summer and Resort for Swim. The Zimmermann brand now includes the lines Ready-to-Wear, Swim and Resort, Kids, and Accessories.

== Editorial ==
The brand received acclaim from household names such as Beyoncé, Kendall Jenner, Gigi and Bella Hadid, Margot Robbie, Chrissy Teigen, Karlie Kloss, Jessica Alba, Kate Hudson, Paris Jackson, Jessica Biel, Jennifer Lopez, Lana Del Rey, Taylor Swift, Katy Perry, and Sara Hodgkinson.

== Locations ==
Zimmermann has 56 stores located throughout Australia, the US, and the UK.

The collections are stocked in stores internationally, including Barney's, Saks 5th Avenue, Bergdorf Goodman, Selfridges, Harrods, and Harvey Nichols. Zimmermann is also featured on Net-A- Porter.

Zimmermann also maintains showrooms in Sydney, London, France, Milan, New York and Los Angeles.

== Awards and recognitions ==
The brand received the Australian Fashion Laureate Award in 2014, AFI Best Swimwear Designer, Prix de Marie Claire Best Swimwear Brand, and Prix de Marie Claire Best Swimwear Designer.

Nicky Zimmermann has been a member of the Australian Fashion Week Advisory Board and has previously been a mentor for the Qantas Spirit of Australia Youth Awards. Nicky was also a founding board member of the Australian Fashion Chamber.
