= East Sydney =

East Sydney may refer to:

- Eastern Suburbs (Sydney)
- East Sydney (locality)
- Division of East Sydney
- Electoral district of East Sydney
- East Sydney Australian Football Club
