= M.J. Bale =

Australian fashion label

- Type: Private
- Industry: Fashion retailer
- Founded: 2009; 17 years ago
- Founder: Matt Jensen
- Headquarters: Sydney, Australia
- Area served: Australia
- Key people: Matt Jensen (CEO); David Briskin (Chairman)
- Products: Suits, jackets, trousers, shirts, knitwear
- Website: mjbale.com

M.J. Bale is an Australian menswear and fashion label headquartered in Sydney, Australia, launched in 2009 by founder Matt Jensen. The company specialises in tailored suiting, casual wear and menswear accessories. It operates through a combination of standalone retail stores, online sales, and department store distribution.

== History ==
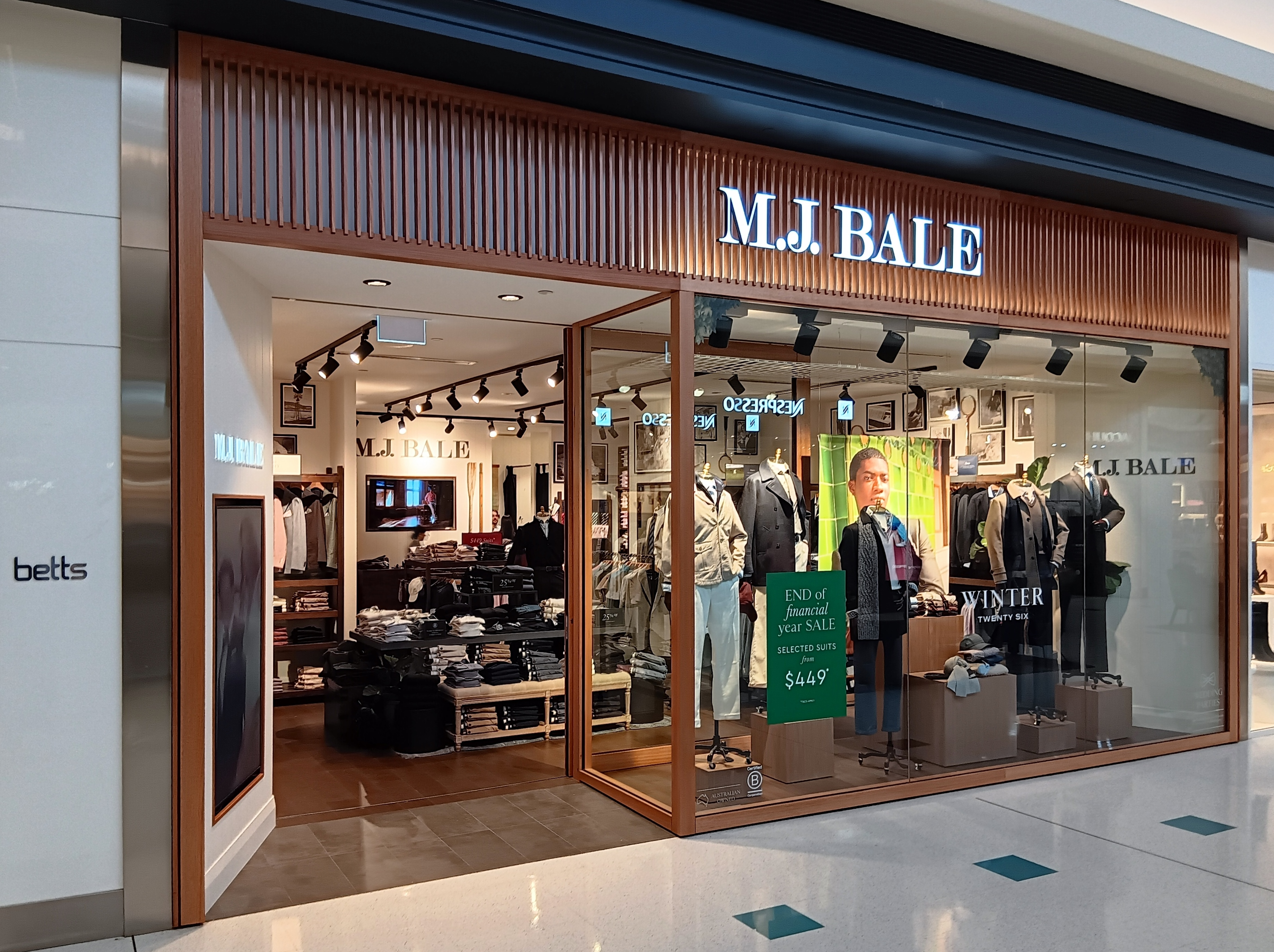
A M.J. Bale store in Perth

M.J. Bale was founded in 2009 by Matt Jensen, who had previously co-founded the tailoring brand Herringbone. M.J. Bale initially focused on wool suits, cotton shirts, Italian silk ties, and made-to-order garments.

The company's first retail store opened in Woollahra, Sydney. By 2010, M.J. Bale products were available in select David Jones and Myer department stores.

In 2017 M.J. Bale launched its Kingston single-origin suiting collection, created from wool sourced from Kingston farm in Tasmania. The Kingston wool is woven into worsted cloth in Italy by Vitale Barberis Canonico, then made into suits for M.J. Bale in Japan.

In 2018, M.J. Bale opened a temporary store at Westfield Century City in Los Angeles as part of the G'day USA initiative. At that time, the company operated more than 50 stores across Australia and New Zealand.

M.J. Bale became Climate Active-certified in 2021 as a 100% carbon neutral company. The certification covered both products and organisation. The company withdrew from the Climate Active program in September 2024.

M.J. Bale received B Corp certification in April 2024.

In March 2024, M.J. Bale opened a flagship store at 1 Martin Place in Sydney's central business district, within the heritage-listed General Post Office building. Designed by Mandy Edge Design Studio, the store features the brand's tailored and ready-to-wear collections.

As of August 2026, the company had 87 stores in Australia and 36 concessions in David Jones and Myer department stores. It was also intending to open a store on Jermyn Street in London in November that year as the first stage of an intended expansion into the UK.

== Business overview ==
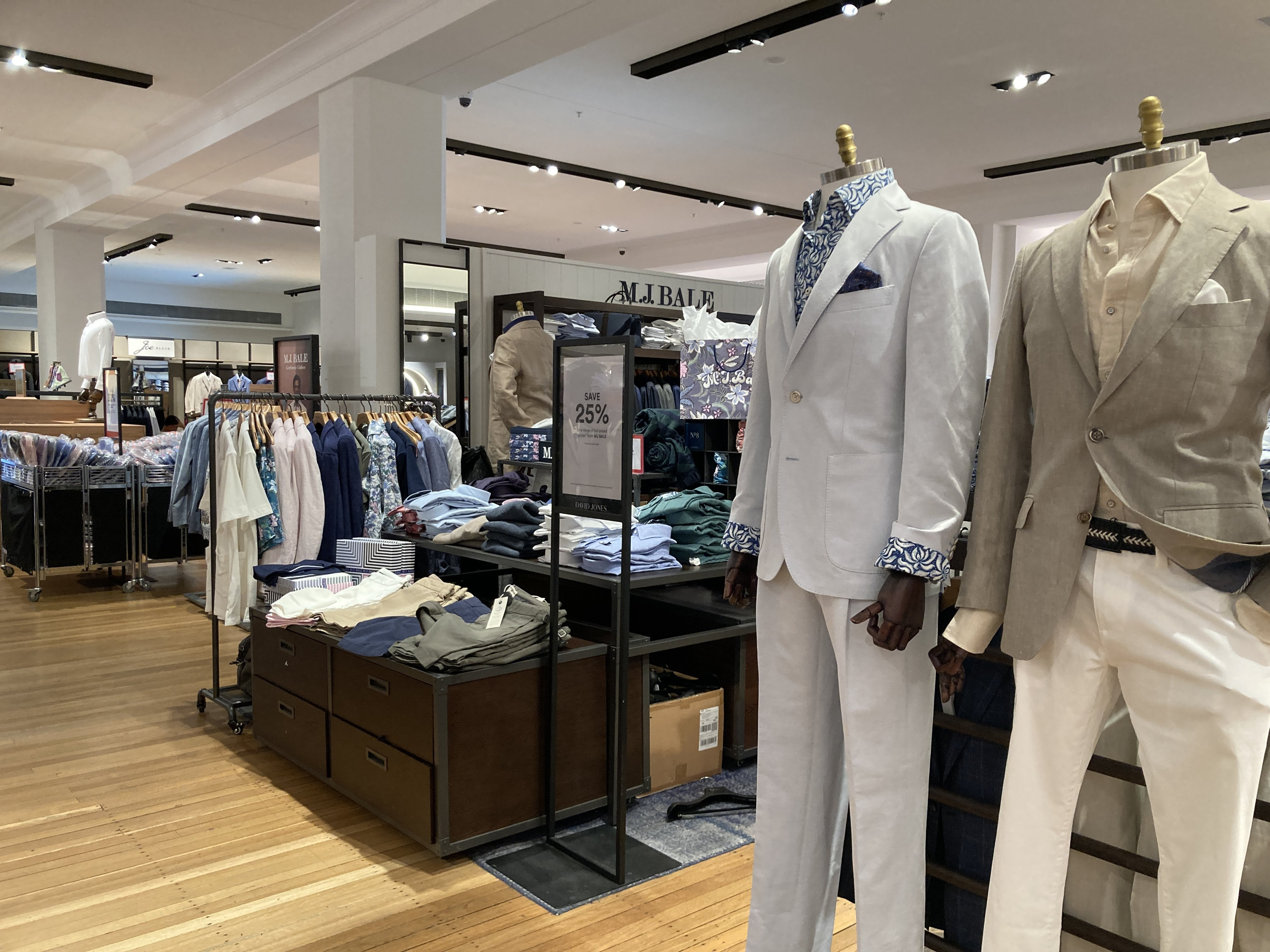
A M.J. Bale concession in a David Jones department store

M.J. Bale's product range includes tailored suits, jackets, trousers, shirts, knitwear, outerwear, casualwear, and accessories such as ties and belts. As of 2025, the company operates approximately 85 retail locations across Australia, including an online store, and department store distribution in David Jones and Myer.

M.J. Bale has served as the official tailor for several Australian national sporting teams, including the Wallabies, the Socceroos, the Australian Kangaroos, and the Australian Men's Test cricket team.

== Awards and recognition ==
2012 - M.J. Bale received a Gold Lion in the PR category at the Cannes Lions International Festival of Creativity for its Grazed on Greatness campaign. The campaign involved producing suits using wool from Merino sheep that had grazed on grass from the Sydney Cricket Ground. The campaign received media coverage in Australia and internationally.

2022 - M.J. Bale was named in The Australian Financial Review Sustainability Leaders list.

2024 - M.J. Bale received B Corp certification.

== Sustainability ==
=== Biodiversity conservation and farm partnerships ===
Since 2015, M.J. Bale has partnered with Kingston Farm, a conservation-focused Merino wool property in Tasmania's Northern Midlands. Kingston Farm contains approximately 8–10 percent of Tasmania's remaining indigenous native grasslands and provides habitat for threatened and endangered species.

In 2017, the company formalised a product stewardship program with Kingston Farm, expanding the partnership beyond wool supply into biodiversity conservation. M.J. Bale developed its Kingston single-origin suiting collection using superfine Merino wool sourced exclusively from the farm. A percentage of sales from Kingston garments is returned to the property, which owner Simon Cameron reinvests into habitat preservation, revegetation projects, and land regeneration initiatives.

In 2024, M.J. Bale committed up to A$300,000 over three years to Kingston farm to support conservation programs, including native tree and shrub planting, shelter belts to protect grasslands, and ecological monitoring in collaboration with the Tasmanian Land Conservancy and the World Wildlife Fund.

In 2025, the company donated A$25,000 from tuxedo sales to Fairyland, a privately owned conservation reserve on Tasmania's Bruny Island that operates as a biological sanctuary for native flora and fauna.

=== Methane-reduced wool initiatives ===
From 2020, M.J. Bale partnered with Kingston Farm and Sea Forest Tasmania to trial the production of methane-reduced wool through dietary supplementation of sheep with asparagopsis taxiformis, a native red seaweed shown in scientific studies to reduce methane emissions in ruminant livestock.

An initial trial conducted between 2020 and 2021 involved 48 Merino sheep fed a seaweed supplement equivalent to approximately 0.2 percent of their daily diet over a 300-day period. The trial was monitored in conjunction with academic researchers, including involvement from the University of Tasmania. Wool produced from the trial was processed into limited garment runs.

As part of efforts to reduce transport-related emissions, a portion of the wool was transported from Kingston Farm using bicycles and an engineless sailing vessel to Victoria, where it was processed into knitwear.

Between 2021 and 2023, Kingston sheep fed the seaweed supplement produced approximately 1.3 tonnes of methane-reduced superfine Merino wool. The wool was woven into worsted cloth by Italian mill Vitale Barberis Canonico and manufactured into limited-edition jackets by Lubiam 1911 in Mantua, Italy.

=== Carbon neutrality and certification ===
In 2021, M.J. Bale became Australia's first fashion brand to achieve Climate Active certification as carbon neutral for both its organisation and products, following a life-cycle analysis of its manufacturing and supply chain emissions. The certification is administered by the Australian Government's Climate Active Program.

As part of its emissions strategy, the company invested in environmental offset projects, including the Yarra Yarra Biodiversity Corridor and renewable energy initiatives. M.J. Bale stated that it aimed to transition its retail network to renewable energy, with approximately half of its stores powered by renewables as of 2021 and in FY2022 M.J. Bale sourced 100% renewable electricity for the retail stores (tenancy) through either GreenPower or purchase of Renewable Energy Certificates.

The company withdrew from the Climate Active program in September 2024.

=== B Corporation certification ===
In April 2024, M.J. Bale achieved B Corporation certification, receiving a score of 84.2. The certification, administered by non-profit organisation B Lab, assesses companies across governance, workers, community, environment, and customers.

M.J. Bale received its highest score in environmental impact, with a score of 24.6. B Corp certification is subject to reassessment every three years.

== Controversies ==
M.J. Bale's corporate headquarters in Sydney

=== Wage underpayments ===
In 2019, M.J. Bale identified and disclosed underpayments to retail staff relating to the application of Australia’s general retail industry award. The issue arose following a wage query from a staff member, which led the company to conduct an internal payroll review.

The review found that some employees had been underpaid in relation to annual leave loading, overtime, and higher-duties payments. M.J. Bale subsequently repaid approximately A$500,000 in wages, interest, and superannuation to affected current and former employees. PwC (PricewaterhouseCoopers) was engaged to recalculate wages and assist with payroll compliance processes.

=== ASIC infringement notice ===
In 2025, the Australian Securities and Investments Commission (ASIC) issued infringement notices to 12 large proprietary companies under the Corporations Act 2001 (Cth), including M.J.Bale Group, for allegedly failing to lodge their FY23/FY24 audited financial reports on time, as the result of a three-month surveillance following ASIC’s increased focus on large proprietary companies not meeting obligation of reporting. M.J.Bale Group paid a penalty of A$198,000.

== See also ==
- List of companies named after people
