= I'm a Celebrity...Get Me Out of Here! (Australian TV series) season 4 =

I'm a Celebrity...Get Me Out of Here!
- Season 4
- Hosted by: Chris Brown; Julia Morris
- No. of days: 45
- No. of contestants: 15
- Winner: Fiona O'Loughlin
- Runner-up: Shannon Noll
- Location: Kruger National Park, South Africa
- No. of episodes: 31

Release
- Original network: Network Ten
- Original release: 28 January – 12 March 2018

Series chronology
- ← Previous; Season 3 Next → Season 5

The fourth season of Australia's I'm a Celebrity...Get Me Out of Here, which was commissioned by Network Ten on 8 November 2017, premiered on 28 January 2018 and concluded on 12 March 2018. The season contained the show's 100th episode which was broadcast on 5 February 2018. Comedian Fiona O'Loughlin won the series, beating singer Shannon Noll and boxer Danny Green, and was crowned "Queen of the Jungle", the $100,000 prize money, was won for her selected charity, Angel Flight.

== Celebrities ==
Celebrity	Known for	Status	Source
Fiona O'Loughlin	Comedian & author	Winner on 12 March 2018	
Shannon Noll	Singer-songwriter	Runner-up on 12 March 2018	
Danny Green	Professional boxer	Third place on 12 March 2018	
Vicky Pattison	Television & media personality (I'm a Celeb UK 15 winner)	Eliminated 10th on 11 March 2018	
Simone Holtznagel	Model	Eliminated 9th on 8 March 2018	
Peter Rowsthorn	Actor & comedian	Eliminated 8th on 7 March 2018	
Jackie Gillies	The Real Housewives of Melbourne star	Eliminated 7th on 6 March 2018	
Josh Gibson	Former AFL player	Eliminated 6th on 5 March 2018	
Paul Burrell	Former Royal Household butler & author (I'm a Celeb UK 4 runner up)	Eliminated 5th on 4 March 2018	
Lisa Oldfield	The Real Housewives of Sydney star	Eliminated 4th on 1 March 2018	
David Oldfield	Former politician	Eliminated 3rd on 25 February 2018	
Kerry Armstrong	Stage & screen actress	Eliminated 2nd on 18 February 2018	
Tiffany Darwish	Singer-songwriter	Eliminated 1st on 11 February 2018	
Anthony Mundine	Professional boxer	Withdrew on 8 February 2018	
Bernard Tomic	Professional tennis player	Withdrew on 30 January 2018	

=== Celebrity guests ===
Ep	Celebrity	Known for	Reason of visit	Ref
20	Steve Price	Journalist & radio broadcaster (I'm a Celeb 3 contestant)	Hosted jungle radio	
23	John Edward	Psychic	Gave the celebrity's psychic readings	
26	Sandra Sully	Ten Eyewitness News (now 10 News First) presenter	Updating celebrities on world news	

== Results and elimination ==
Indicates that the celebrity received the most votes from the public
Indicates that the celebrity was immune from the vote
Indicates that the celebrity was named as being in the bottom 2 or 3.
Indicates that the celebrity received the fewest votes and was eliminated immediately (no bottom three)
Indicates that the celebrity withdrew from the competition

Elimination results per celebrity
Celebrity	Week 1	Week 2	Week 3	Week 4	Week 5		Week 6					Grand Finale	Number of Trials
Celebrity	Week 1	Week 2	Week 3	Week 4	Day 34	Day 37	Day 38	Day 39	Day 40	Day 41	Day 44	Grand Finale	Number of Trials
Fiona	—N/a	Safe	Safe	Safe	Safe	Safe	Safe	Safe	Bottom three	Safe	Safe	Winner (Day 45)	11
Shannon	—N/a	Safe	Bottom three	Safe	Bottom three	Safe	Bottom three	Safe	Safe	Safe	Safe	Runner-up (Day 45)	12
Danny	Not in Camp	Safe	Safe	Safe	Safe	Safe	Bottom three	Safe	Safe	Safe	Safe	Third place (Day 45)	11
Vicky	Not in Camp		Immune	Bottom three	Safe	Bottom three	Safe	Bottom three	Bottom three	Safe	4th	Eliminated (Day 44)	10
Simone	—N/a	Bottom three	Bottom three	Safe	Bottom three	Safe	Safe	Bottom three	Safe	5th	Eliminated (Day 41)		11
Peter	—N/a	Safe	Safe	Safe	Safe	Bottom three	Safe	Safe	6th	Eliminated (Day 40)			12
Jackie	—N/a	Safe	Safe	Safe	Safe	Safe	Safe	7th	Eliminated (Day 39)				15
Josh	—N/a	Safe	Safe	Safe	Safe	Safe	8th	Eliminated (Day 38)					10
Paul	Not in Camp		Immune	Safe	Safe	9th	Eliminated (Day 37)						7
Lisa	Not in Camp			Bottom three	10th	Eliminated (Day 34)							6
David	Not in Camp			11th	Eliminated (Day 30)								4
Kerry	—N/a	Bottom three	12th	Eliminated (Day 23)									5
Tiffany	—N/a	13th	Eliminated (Day 16)										4
Anthony	—N/a	Withdrew (Day 12)											5
Bernard	Withdrew (Day 3)												2
Withdrew	Bernard	Anthony	None										
Bottom two/three	None	Kerry, Simone, Tiffany	Kerry, Shannon, Simone	David, Lisa, Vicky	Lisa, Shannon, Simone	Paul, Peter, Vicky	Danny, Josh, Shannon	Jackie, Simone, Vicky	Fiona, Peter, Vicky	None			
Eliminated	None	Tiffany; Fewest votes to save	Kerry; Fewest votes to save	David; Fewest votes to save	Lisa; Fewest votes to save	Paul; Fewest votes to save	Josh; Fewest votes to save	Jackie; Fewest votes to save	Peter; Fewest votes to save	Simone; Fewest votes to save	Vicky; Fewest votes to save	Danny; Fewest votes to win (out of 3)	
Eliminated	None	Tiffany; Fewest votes to save	Kerry; Fewest votes to save	David; Fewest votes to save	Lisa; Fewest votes to save	Paul; Fewest votes to save	Josh; Fewest votes to save	Jackie; Fewest votes to save	Peter; Fewest votes to save	Simone; Fewest votes to save	Vicky; Fewest votes to save	Shannon; Fewest votes to win (out of 3)	
Eliminated	None	Tiffany; Fewest votes to save	Kerry; Fewest votes to save	David; Fewest votes to save	Lisa; Fewest votes to save	Paul; Fewest votes to save	Josh; Fewest votes to save	Jackie; Fewest votes to save	Peter; Fewest votes to save	Simone; Fewest votes to save	Vicky; Fewest votes to save	Fiona; Most votes to win	

== Tucker Trials ==
The contestants take part in daily trials to earn food. These trials aim to test both physical and mental abilities. Success is usually determined by the number of stars collected during the trial, with each star representing a meal earned by the winning contestant for their camp mates.

The public voted for who they wanted to face the trial
The contestants decided who did which trial
The trial was compulsory and neither the public nor celebrities decided who took part
The contestants were chosen by the evicted celebrities

Trial number	Air date	Name of trial	Celebrity participation	Number of stars/Winner(s)	Notes	Source
1	28 January	The Jungle Prep Centre	Bernard; Fiona; Jackie; Josh; Kerry; Peter; Shannon; Simone; Tiffany	6/9 stars	None	
2	29 January	A Bridge Too Far	Bernard; Fiona	3/10 stars	1	
3	30 January	The Grossery Store	Fiona; Jackie; Josh; Simone	10/10 stars	2	
4	31 January	Boulder Dash	Anthony; Jackie; Peter; Shannon; Tiffany	9/9 stars	None	
5	4 February	The Heavyweight Championship	Anthony; Danny	Danny	3	
6	5 February	Ready, Steady, No	Danny; Jackie; Kerry; Shannon; Simone	10/10 stars	None	
7	6 February	Let's Get Trunk	Anthony; Jackie	9/10 stars	None	
8	7 February	Hangry Birds	Anthony; Josh; Tiffany	1/10 stars	4	
9	8 February	The Viper Room	Anthony; Danny	10/10 stars	None	
10	11 February	Hot Swingers	Fiona; Jackie; Kerry; Peter	6/9 stars	None	
11	12 February	Feeling Flushed	Jackie; Josh	2/8 stars	None	
12	13 February	Dining In The Dark	Shannon; Simone	10/10 stars	None	
13	14 February	The World's End	Paul; Vicky	6/10 stars	None	
14	15 February	Shafted	Paul	7/10 stars	None	
15	18 February	Blind Soccer	Danny; Fiona; Jackie; Josh; Kerry; Paul; Peter; Shannon; Simone; Vicky	Danny; Josh; Paul; Peter; Shannon	5	
16	19 February	Holy Water	Peter	9/9 stars	None	
17	20 February	I Scream Shop	Jackie; Simone; Vicky	10/10 stars	None	
18	21 February	Target Practice	Danny; David; Jackie; Lisa; Shannon	6/11 stars	None	
19	22 February	Bug Busters	David; Fiona; Lisa; Peter; Vicky	3/11 stars	None	
20	25 February	The School of Hard Shocks	Danny; David; Fiona; Jackie; Josh; Lisa; Paul; Peter; Shannon; Simone; Vicky	Fiona; Jackie; Lisa; Paul; Simome; Vicky	6	
21	26 February	Big Babies	Josh; Paul	5/10 stars	None	
22	27 February	African Mornings	Lisa; Shannon; Simone	5/10 stars	None	
23	28 February	Newton's Cradle	Danny; Lisa; Vicky	10/10 stars	None	
24	1 March	Creepy Crawler	Jackie	10/10 stars	None	
25	4 March	Meals on Wheels	Danny; Fiona; Jackie; Josh; Paul; Peter; Shannon; Simone; Vicky	Jackie; Josh; Paul; Shannon; Vicky	None	
26	5 March	Balls of Steel	Josh; Peter; Simone; Vicky	8/8 stars	None	
27	6 March	A-gag-emy Awards	Danny; Fiona; Jackie; Peter; Shannon; Simone; Vicky	7/7 stars	None	
28	7 March	The Sweeper	Peter	6/6 stars	None	
29	8 March	Help From Our Friends	Danny; Fiona; Shannon; Simone; Vicky	1.5/5 stars	None	
30	11 March	Family Tree	Danny; Fiona; Shannon; Vicky	8/8 stars	7	
31	12 March	Stairway to Heaven	Danny; Fiona; Shannon	3/3 stars	None	

Notes

- ^1Anthony had to decide which two contestants had to do the Tucker Trial.
- ^2As the tucker trial was created before Bernard departed, the contestants were still able to try and win 10 stars instead of nine.
- ^3The tucker trial involved both Anthony & Danny weighing themselves in at the beginning, eating all different types of disgusting foods and then weighing themselves again, who ever gained the most weight would win. Both contestants had supporters, the winner would receive meals for himself and his supporters. Danny's supporters were Fiona & Peter.
- ^4Tiffany's fear of heights made her exclude herself from the challenge, as a result Chris decided to take her place for her.
- ^5The trial was called blind soccer- with the celebrities being blindfolded and an assortment of animals introduced onto the pitch during and in between rounds. The game was boys VS girls- with the boys winning 4:3. There was one round where the hosts (Dr Chris Brown and Lady Julia Morris) allowed the girls to take off their blindfolds as they were losing.
- ^6Before the trial the celebrities picked teams- one being Peter's and the other Simone's. Simone's team won the trial so they got to 'feast like kings'. Peter's team (who lost the trial) survived on very small portions of rationed rice and beans for dinner.
- ^7During this episode the celebrities were reunited with their family members as it was their third-last day in camp. The family members stayed with their celebrity for the day and a one of them took part in the tucker trial with the celebrity. In the end they found all the stars and had a KFC family feast for dinner. This was enjoyed with all of the family members.

== Star count ==
Celebrity	Number of stars earned	Percentage
Anthony Mundine	6/9 stars	67%
Bernard Tomic	9/19 stars	47%
Danny Green	55.5/64 stars	87%
David Oldfield	9/22 stars	41%
Fiona O'Loughlin	37.5/72 stars	52%
Jackie Gillies	85/88 stars	97%
Josh Gibson	39/62 stars	63%
Kerry Armstrong	22/28 stars	97%
Lisa Oldfield	24/42 stars	%
Paul Burrell	18/30 stars	%
Peter Rowsthorn	63.5/75 stars	%
Shannon Noll		%
Simone Holtznagel		%
Tiffany Darwish	16/28 stars	57%
Vicky Pattison	46.5/61 stars	76%

== Camp Leader ==
Celebrity			No. of Votes for Leader	Original Run		No. of days as Camp Leader
Leader		Deputy (assigned by Leader)	No. of Votes for Leader	First day	Last day	No. of days as Camp Leader
1	Anthony Mundine	Shannon Noll	Automatic Camp Leader on entry	Day 2	Day 12	10
2	Shannon Noll	Fiona O'Loughlin	Automatic (as former deputy)	Day 12	Day 26	14
3	Peter Rowsthorn	Simone Holtznagel	Australia's Vote	Day 26	Day 35	9

== Celebrity Chest Challenges ==
Two or more celebrities are chosen to take part in the "Celebrity Chest" challenge to win luxuries for camp. Each challenge involves completing a task to win a chest to take back to camp. However, to win the luxury item in the chest, the campmates must correctly answer a question. If they fail to answer correctly, the luxury item is forfeited and a joke prize is won. . This process is used in 'most' of the Chest Challenges. The luxury item is "donated" by a celebrity from the outside, mostly one who previously competed on a previous season.

The celebrities got the question correct
The celebrities got the question wrong

Episode	Air date	Chest challenge	Celebrity participation	Celebrity prize donor	Prize	Note	Source
9	8 February	Richie the Happy Hippo	Josh & Simone	Casey Donovan	Biscuits	None	
14	15 February	Goats Cops and Robbers	Fiona & Peter	Dane Swan	Goats Cheese & Crackers	None	
19	22 February	TBA	Danny & Paul	Natalie Bassingthwaighte	Mudcake Bites	None	
21	26 February	Codebreakers & Treasure Hunters	Danny, Jackie, Peter, Shannon & Vicky	N/A	Pirate Party	8	

Notes

- ^8The five celebrities in the chest challenge opened the chest, the five celebrities were awarded a pirate party with snacks and alcoholic beverages, but it was only for them and they could not tell the rest of the celebrities about the party.

== Ratings ==
I'm a Celebrity...Get Met Out of Here! (season 4) overnight ratings, with metropolitan viewership and nightly position
Week	Episode		Original airdate	Timeslot (approx.)	Viewers (millions)^{[a]}	Nightly rank^{[a]}	Source
1	1	"Opening Night"	28 January 2018	Sunday 7:30 pm	1.274	4	
1	1	"Welcome to the Jungle"	28 January 2018	Sunday 7:30 pm	1.108	5	
1	2	"Episode 2"	29 January 2018	Monday 7:30 pm	0.858	9	
1	3	"Episode 3"	30 January 2018	Tuesday 7:30 pm	0.852	8	
1	4	"Episode 4"	31 January 2018	Wednesday 7:30 pm	0.780	9	
2	5	"Episode 5"	4 February 2018	Sunday 7:30 pm	0.882	4	
2	6	"Episode 6"^{[b]}	5 February 2018	Monday 7:30 pm	0.712	10	
2	7	"Episode 7"	6 February 2018	Tuesday 7:30 pm	0.626	11	
2	8	"Episode 8"	7 February 2018	Wednesday 7:30 pm	0.635	9	
2	9	"Episode 9"	8 February 2018	Thursday 7:30 pm	0.713	7	
3	10	"Episode 10"	11 February 2018	Sunday 7:30 pm	0.614	11	
3	10	"Eviction"	11 February 2018	Sunday 7:30 pm	0.651	8	
3	11	"Episode 11"	12 February 2018	Monday 7:30 pm	0.621	12	
3	12	"Episode 12"	13 February 2018	Tuesday 7:30 pm	0.526	14	
3	13	"Episode 13"	14 February 2018	Wednesday 7:30 pm	0.515	14	
3	14	"Episode 14"	15 February 2018	Thursday 7:30 pm	0.581	11	
4	15	"Episode 15"	18 February 2018	Sunday 7:30 pm	0.544	10	
4	15	"Eviction"	18 February 2018	Sunday 7:30 pm	0.618	8	
4	16	"Episode 16"	19 February 2018	Monday 7:30 pm	0.534	16	
4	17	"Episode 17"	20 February 2018	Tuesday 7:30 pm	0.489	14	
4	18	"Episode 18"	21 February 2018	Wednesday 7:30 pm	0.496	15	
4	19	"Episode 19"	22 February 2018	Thursday 7:30 pm	0.595	11	
5	20	"Episode 20"	25 February 2018	Sunday 7:30 pm	0.607	9	
5	20	"Eviction"	25 February 2018	Sunday 7:30 pm	0.707	7	
5	21	"Episode 21"	26 February 2018	Monday 7:30 pm	0.579	14	
5	22	"Episode 22"	27 February 2018	Tuesday 7:30 pm	0.517	14	
5	23	"Episode 23"	28 February 2018	Wednesday 7:30 pm	0.614	10	
5	24	"Episode 24"	1 March 2018	Thursday 7:30 pm	0.659	9	
5	24	"Eviction"	1 March 2018	Thursday 7:30 pm	0.705	7	
6	25	"Episode 25"	4 March 2018	Sunday 7:30 pm	0.580	8	
6	25	"Eviction"	4 March 2018	Sunday 7:30 pm	0.633	6	
6	26	"Episode 26"	5 March 2018	Monday 7:30 pm	0.591	14	
6	26	"Eviction"	5 March 2018	Monday 7:30 pm	0.599	13	
6	27	"Episode 27"	6 March 2018	Tuesday 7:30 pm	0.569	13	
6	27	"Eviction"	6 March 2018	Tuesday 7:30 pm	0.556	14	
6	28	"Episode 28"	7 March 2018	Wednesday 7:30 pm	0.528	15	
6	28	"Eviction"	7 March 2018	Wednesday 7:30 pm	0.568	10	
6	29	"Episode 29"	8 March 2018	Thursday 7:30 pm	0.548	11	
6	29	"Eviction"	8 March 2018	Thursday 7:30 pm	0.562	10	
7	30	"Episode 30"	11 March 2018	Sunday 7:30 pm	0.549	10	
7	30	"Eviction"	11 March 2018	Sunday 7:30 pm	0.658	6	
7	31	"Finale"	12 March 2018	Monday 7:30 pm	0.684	11	
7	31	"Winner Announced"	12 March 2018	Monday 7:30 pm	0.804	8	

- ^{a} Ratings data is from OzTAM and represents the live and same day average viewership from the 5 largest Australian metropolitan centres (Sydney, Melbourne, Brisbane, Perth and Adelaide).
- ^{b} This was the 100th episode of "I'm a Celebrity...Get Me Out of Here!" to air on Network Ten.
