= Prestige Hong Kong =

Hong Kong lifestyle magazine

Prestige Hong Kong (Magazine)
- Chief Editor: Jon Wall
- Categories: Luxury Lifestyle, Fashion, Society
- Frequency: Monthly
- First issue: September 2005
- Company: Hubert Burda Media
- Country: Hong Kong
- Language: English
- Website: https://www.prestigeonline.com/hk/
- ISSN: 1815-7351

Prestige Hong Kong is a monthly luxury-lifestyle magazine headquartered in Hong Kong. It is owned by BurdaLuxury, a subsidiary of Hubert Burda Media. It publishes English-language articles and interviews on fashion, celebrities, culture, high society, watches and jewellery, lifestyle, wealth and real estate, wine and dining, and motoring.

== Content ==
The magazine, which has editions in several Asian countries, including Thailand, Singapore, Malaysia, Cambodia, Taiwan, and Indonesia, began publishing its Hong Kong edition in 2005. CR Media and 3cm Media founded the magazine as a joint venture. Brian Chow was the founding publisher, George Paddy was the founding editor, and Anne Lim-Chaplain was the founding managing director. Alongside Hong Kong personalities it often features exclusive interviews with international celebrities. In addition to the main book, Prestige Hong Kong contains seasonal supplements with in-depth coverage on fashion, jewellery, watches, health and beauty, dining, property and wealth.

30,000 people subscribed to Prestige Hong Kong in May 2008. In September 2008, Prestige Hong Kong published an 808-page special birthday issue, its largest and heaviest edition, that weighed over 3 kilograms (6.6 lb). In January 2010, CR Media became the sole publisher of the magazine, ending the licensing arrangement with 3cm Media. Paul Ehrlich, the magazine's editor in 2011, left his position and was replaced by Peter Comparelli in his second time as its editor.

In September 2010, the magazine produced a dual cover edition featuring Kim and Khloé Kardashian. In April 2011, Steve Ellul, former creative director of the South China Morning Post, joined the magazine as the artistic director. A 2013 cover featured Monica Bellucci, while Ha Ji-won was featured in a 2018 cover. In March 2022, South Korean rapper T.O.P appeared as the cover model for Prestige Hong Kong, ahead of his comeback announcement, marking his return after a five-year hiatus from the entertainment industry.

== Prestige Online ==
Prestige Online is the online web portal of the Prestige brand providing a similar range of luxury-lifestyle content. It is operated by Burda International Asia.
