= Toni Matičevski =

Australian fashion designer

- Тони Матичевски
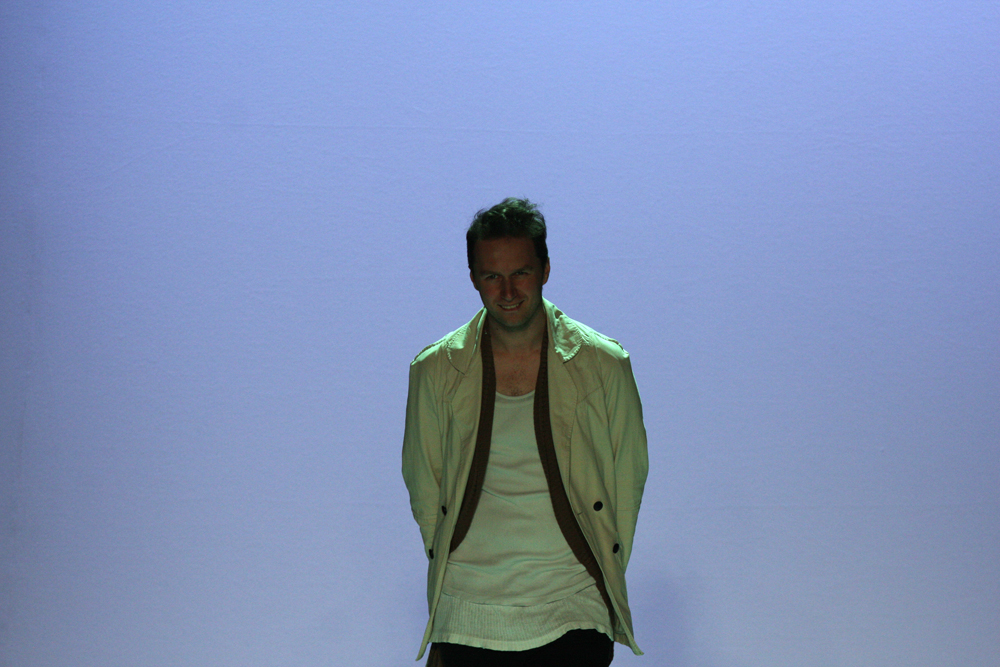
- Born: 1977 (age 48–49); Melbourne, Australia
- Education: RMIT University
- Label: Maticevski

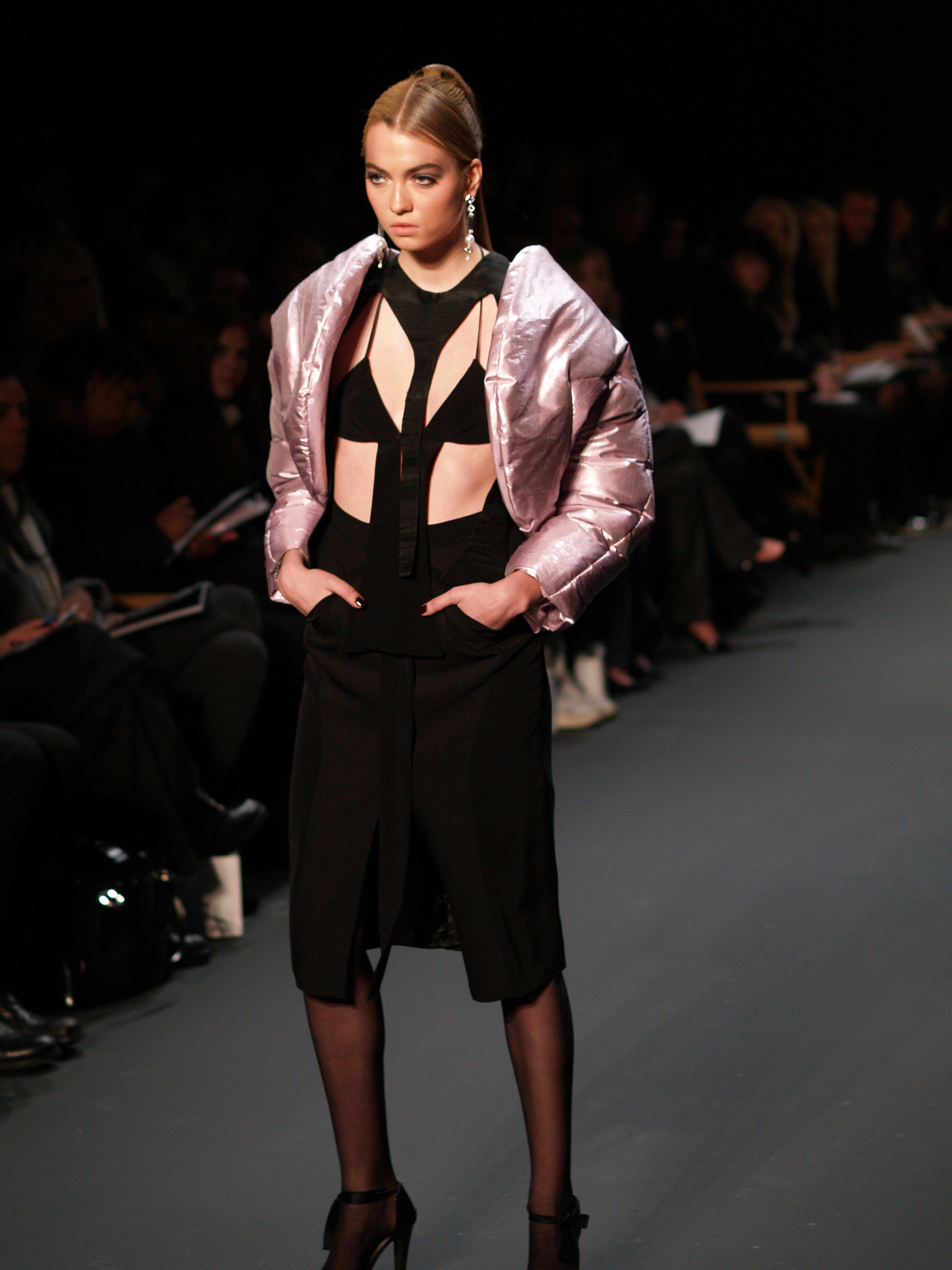
Toni Fashion Week (Fall 2007)

Toni Matičevski (Macedonian: Тони Матичевски; born 1976) is a Melbourne-based Australian fashion designer.

Matičevski's parents migrated from the then non-independent Republic of Macedonia when it was still part of Yugoslavia. He grew up in Seddon, an inner-Western suburb of Melbourne with a sizeable Macedonian community.

Matičevski studied fashion at RMIT University graduating with First Class Honours. After graduating he won a Fashion Group International Award resulting in a placement with Donna Karan in New York. Matičevski turned down an extended position at Donna Karan, deeming the power house creatively draining. Matičevski left for Paris to work two seasons at Cerruti. Matičevski returned to Melbourne in 1998 to launch his own label. In 2002, Matičevski won Best New Designer at the L'Oréal Melbourne Fashion Festival with his debut demi-couture collection. The same year saw his preliminary participation in the Mercedes-Benz Australian Fashion Week spring and summer collections. In 2005 he tied with Kit Willow for the Prix de Marie Claire Best New Designer award.

Matičevski creates such designs as skeletal dresses, held together (or to hold you together) with a bondage system of raw edged silk straps.

Each season Matičevski recreates his elaborate gowns in different styles and materials while retaining a similar silhouette. Matičevski has recently added a men's line to his label with fluid draping neutral jackets and trousers.

== Exhibitions ==
In 2016, a major exhibition of Matičevski's work is being held at the Bendigo Art Gallery. "Selected objects will be presented to illustrate the evolution of Toni Maticevski’s oeuvre, exploring his early influences through to his inspiration and recurrent themes in his current practice."
