= Cue (clothing) =

Australian clothing store

- Industry: Fashion
- Founded: 1968
- Headquarters: Surry Hills, Sydney, Australia

Cue is a clothing brand that was established in 1968. Its first store opened in the Strand Arcade, Sydney, Australia. Cue predominantly sells modern fashion from London and exclusive prints. Cue also owns sister brand Veronika Maine. Together, they had 51 stores in Australia and New Zealand, as well as concession stores in department stores Myer, David Jones and Ballantynes.

== History ==
Cue was opened in 1968. Designs seen in Cue stores are ones that originate from Cue's head office in Surry Hills, Sydney, and most clothing is made in Australia. Cue works with fabric mills in Europe to develop fabrics to the design teams' own specifications and print designs.

In April 2025, the Levis family sold the company to British investment firm Hilco Capital. Cue entered receivership in September 2026. Prof Jana Bowden told news.com.au the brand had become antiquated, camouflaged and too focused on its "rigid" business wear roots. Receivers and managers FTI Consulting said despite improvements to the company they weren't enough to counter the expenses the company was facing. BDO were appointed voluntary administrators.

Justin Levis is suing his family seeking a constructive trust of 50% of the company. He was reportedly terminated in May 2025 following the collpase of debtor Dion Lee despite his contributions to the company and link to its lineage.

In September 2026, the company entered voluntary administration and receivership. The following month, receivers announced they are closing down 26 stores, up from 5 original others, as these were seen as ruled out of a sale by buyers. In November 2026, Cue was purchased by a consortium led by Bill Wavish.

== Awards ==
=== 2011 ===
- Prix de Marie Claire Awards – Winner Best Australian Fashion Brand
- Grazia Fashion Awards – Winner Favourite Overall High Street Chain

=== 2010 ===
- Myer Supplier of the Year Awards – Winner Community Services Award

=== 2009 ===
- TNT Ragtrader Fashion Retailer of the Year Awards – Winner Fashion Retailer of the Year (Note: Not Awarded Since)
- Prix de Marie Claire Awards – Finalist Best Australian Fashion Brand

=== 2007 ===
- Marie Claire Prix de Excellence Awards – Winner Best Australian Fashion Brand
- Harper's Bazaar Online Style Awards – Winner Best Australian Fashion Store
- Myer Supplier of the Year Awards – Winner Supplier of the Year
- Myer Supplier of the Year Awards – Winner Myer Concession – Store Within Our Store Award

=== 2018 ===
- Online Retail Industry Awards – Winner Best In-Store Initiative

=== 2019 ===
- Online Retail Industry Awards – Winner Best Multi-channel Retailer
- CX Awards - Winner Best Multi-channel Customer Experience
