= Antonio Marras =

Italian fashion designer (born 1961)

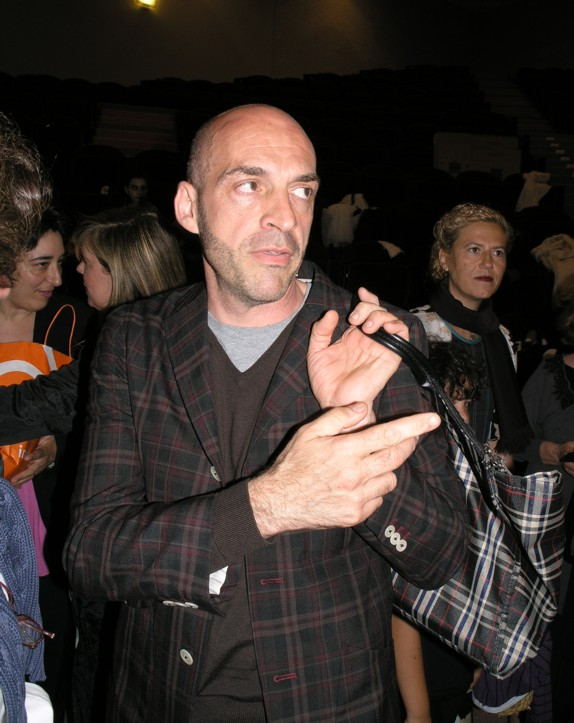
- Born: 21 January 1961 (age 64); Alghero, Sardinia, Italy
- Occupation: fashion designer

Antonio Marras (born 21 January 1961) is an Italian fashion designer.

== Biography ==
Born in Alghero, the son of the owner of a fashion boutique, Marras was an autodidact, and launched his brand in 1987. He had his breakout in 1996, presenting his couture collection at the Alta Roma event in Rome. In 1999, he launched his first ready-to-wear collection. Between 2003 and 2011 he was artistic director of Kenzo. He then reprised his work with his brand, and in 2023 the 80% of his company was acquired by Calzedonia, with Marras staying as creative director.

Marras is also active on stage as a costume designer. In 2011 he took part in the Venice Biennale with the installation Archivio Provvisorio. He is married and has two sons.
