= Etro =

Italian fashion house (founded 1968)

- Type: Private
- Industry: Retail
- Founded: 1968
- Founder: Gimmo Etro
- Headquarters: Milan, Italy
- Area served: Worldwide
- Key people: Kean Etro; Jacopo Etro; Veronica Etro; Ippolito Etro
- Products: Clothing, footwear, handbags, jewellery, perfumes, textiles and home furnishings
- Revenue: ▲US$372 million (2018)
- Website: www.etro.com

Etro is an Italian luxury fashion house founded in 1968, recognized by its paisley patterns. In December 2025 the founding family sold its remaining stake and completely exited the company. Fabrizio Cardinali is the CEO.

== History ==
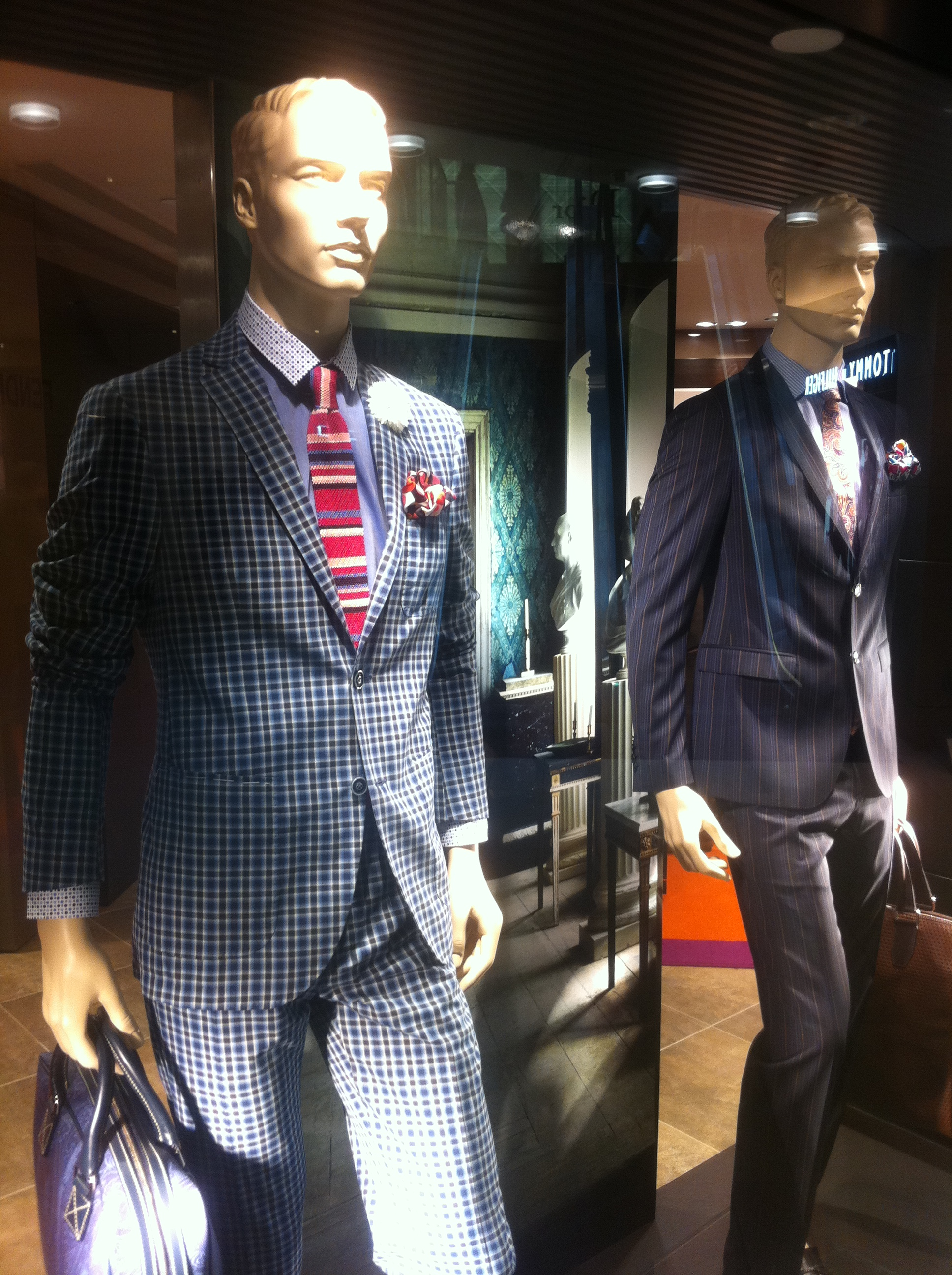
Etro in 2012 in Hong Kong

Etro was founded in 1968 by Gerolamo "Gimmo" Etro as a textile design company. At the time of the company’s founding, Gimmo and his wife, Roberta, an antiques dealer, had assembled a collection of 300 antique shawls, which remains one of the largest private collections of its kind. The paisley motif and its variations became a central element of Etro's design identity over the following decades.

The company's headquarters, located on Via Spartaco in Milan, was renovated in 1977. The site includes a textile archive and in-house library. Jacopo Etro, who would later lead the textiles division, recalled visiting the archive as a child and experimenting with fabric design.

Following a trip to India by company executives, Etro launched a furnishing textiles line in 1981. The paisley design encountered during this trip became closely associated with the brand, as noted by Elle Magazine.

In 1984, Etro began producing leather goods using Paisley Jacquard fabrics, and introduced its home collection in 1985. The fragrance line was launched in 1989, with its first boutique opening on Via Verri in Milan. Subsequent additions included fragrances such as Rajasthan and Jacquard. Etro debuted its first fashion show at Milan Fashion Week in 1996.

In 1999, the company began selling through direct-mail inserts in The New York Times, and in 2013, it expanded into e-commerce alongside its retail operations. In 2014, Rizzoli published a monograph on the company’s history titled Etro.

By 2018, Etro reported €372 million in annual revenue. By 2021, it operated 140 flagship stores in 58 countries, with locations in cities including Milan, London, Paris, New York, Beijing, and Tokyo. That year, Etro established a subsidiary in Seoul to manage its South Korean business.

In 2021, private equity firm L Catterton acquired a 60% stake in the company, valuing Etro at approximately €500 million. In 2022, Etro appointed Marco De Vincenzo as creative director for the women's, men's, and home collections, making him the first designer from outside the Etro family to hold the role.

On December 19, 2025, the founding family sold its minority stake, marking their complete exit from the company. The shares have been acquired by a consortium of industrial investors: Rams Global (Turkey-based leader in luxury real estate and hospitality), Swinger International (led by Mathias Facchini, owner of Genny), and SRI Group (chaired by banker Giulio Gallazzi). L Catterton, the LVMH-backed private equity firm that took majority control in 2021, retains the controlling position (diluted to ~51%) following a capital increase, including approximately €30M from Swinger. The transaction values the deal at over €70 million.

== Management ==
=== Family ===
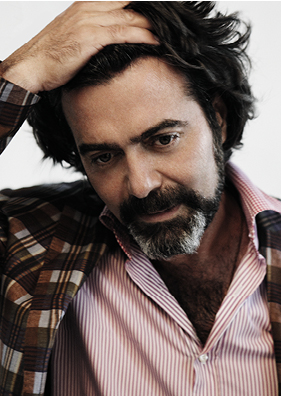
Kean Etro

Etro is identified primarily with Gimmo (born Gerolamo), the founder, however the company is managed by his four children:

- Kean Etro served as creative director for the men's collections. He joined the company in 1986 as a digital intern, created his first menswear collection in 1990, and presented a show themed "New Tradition" in 1996.
- Veronica Etro was creative director for the women's collections, unveiling her first collection in 2000.
- Jacopo Etro joined in 1982 and became creative director of accessories, leather, home, and textiles, as well as head of communication. In 2010, he joined the board of the Camera Nazionale Della Moda Italiana as a delegate for the Italian textile industry.
- Ippolito Etro began working at Etro in 1991, initially in administration before becoming general director. In an interview with The New York Times, he recalled their father's instruction that any family member working at Etro must start from the bottom.

=== CEOs ===
- Fabrizio Cardinali (2021–present)

== Collections ==
=== Menswear ===
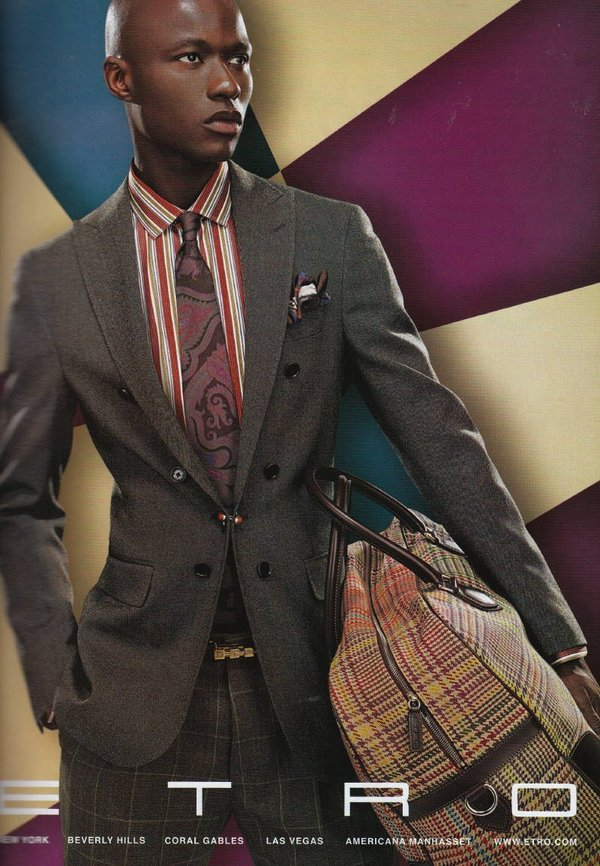
Papis Loveday for the world advertising of the brand ETRO in the year 2009.

Etro's menswear line has been known for conceptual fashion shows. Notably, for the Autumn/Winter 2003 collection, guests viewed the show aboard a 1937 steam train in Milan, with models walking through train cabins. Some designs have included "cooked" shirts, dyed using berries or other organic materials.

=== Womenswear ===
The women's line was launched in 1991. The Spring/Summer 2016 collection, presented in Milan, incorporated a ballet-inspired theme and was noted for its lighter, more relaxed aesthetic. The New York Times described the collection as an "ode to turn-of-the-century femininity" and noted the influence of dance. Since 2017, Veronica and Kean Etro began presenting their collections jointly.

=== Etro Home ===
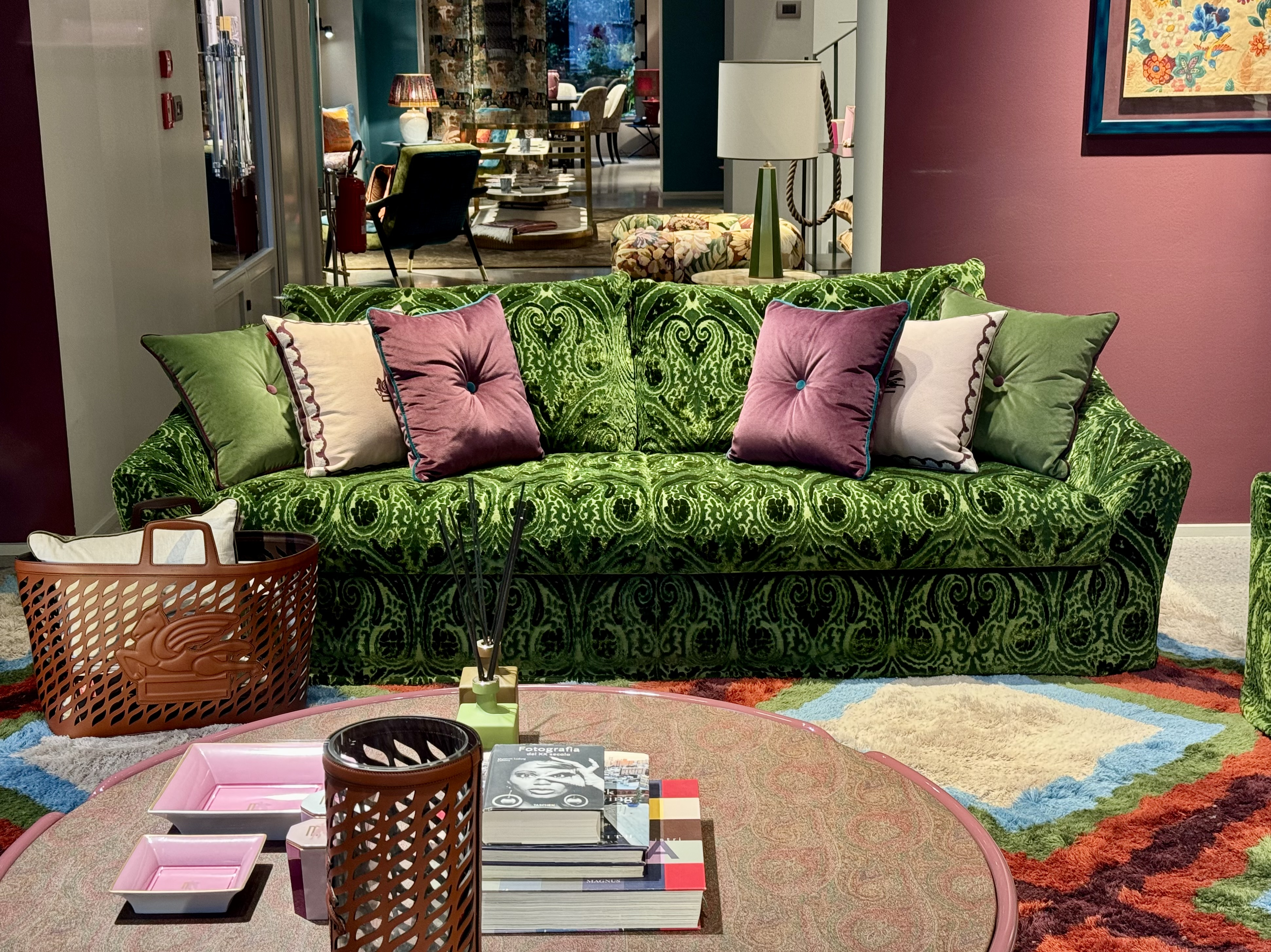
Neoclassic sofa, designed by ETRO Home Interiors Design Team, circa 2024, solid fir wood and multilayer pine wood, polyurethane foam, upholstery, 44 x 235 x 97 cm, sold at Etro Boutique (Via Pontaccio no. 17), Milan

Etro introduced its home textiles line in 1985, later expanding into items such as pillows, plaids, ceramics, gifts, and wallpaper. All items are produced in-house, except for furniture.

In 2014, Etro opened its first standalone Etro Home store in Milan during the Salone del Mobile. In 2017, the company entered a licensing agreement with Jumbo Group (later renamed Oniro Group) for the production and distribution of furniture. In 2020, Etro announced plans to develop outdoor fabrics for use in gardens and on boats.

In 2024, Etro entered into a partnership with Rams Global for customized product supply to Tower Rams Beyond in Istanbul, marking its first residential development. In the same year, Etro announced a residential development project in Ras Al Khaimah, United Arab Emirates, in partnership with Mira Developments.

=== Fragrances ===
Etro also produces fragrances, some of which are inspired by traditional perfumery. In 2024, the company signed an agreement with Coty for the production and distribution of Etro fragrance and home scent collections through 2040 and beyond.

=== Other projects ===
Etro's product range also includes toiletries, leather goods, travel accessories, eyewear, footwear, and jewelry. footwear, In 2023, the company entered into a multi-year licensing agreement with Italian manufacturer Simonetta to launch Etro Kids, a childrenswear line.

== Controversy ==
In 2018, former Etro employee Kim Weiner filed a lawsuit in New York State Supreme Court, alleging workplace discrimination on the basis of race, gender, and age. She claimed she was dismissed after opposing what she described as biased practices at the company.
