= Rocco Barocco =

Italian fashion designer

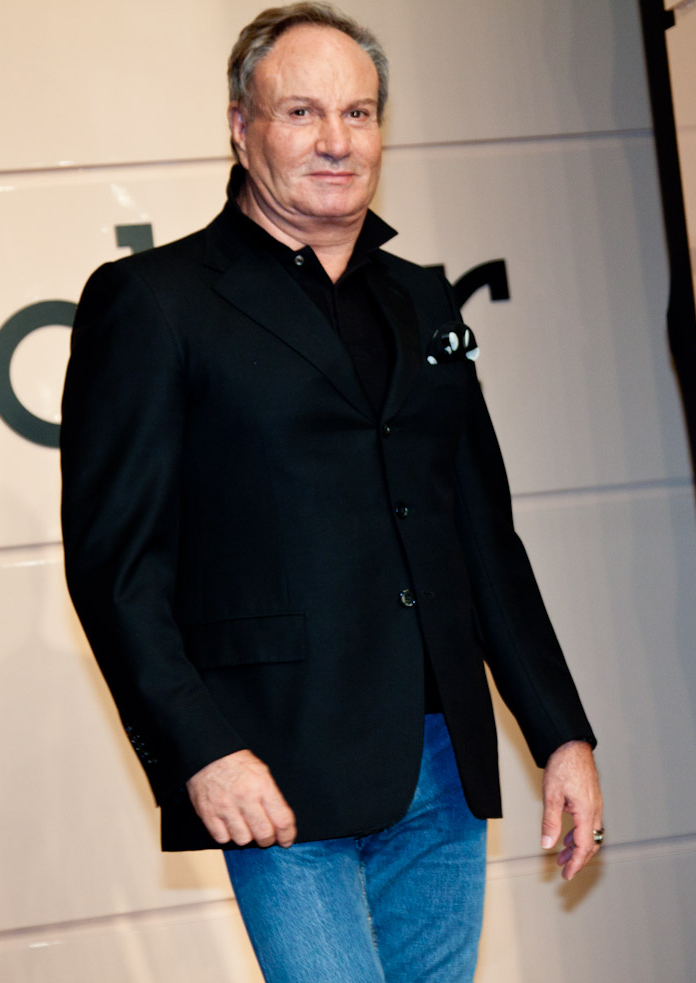
Rocco Barocco in 2010

Rocco Barocco (born 26 March 1944 in Naples, Italy) is a fashion designer.

His real name is Antonio Muscariello. After his first steps in the fashion industry he legally changed his name to Rocco Barocco.

During his childhood and youth, he lived on the island of Ischia southwest of Naples, where he grew up with his eight brothers. Charmed by the fashion world, he decided to move to Rome in 1962, where he worked with Patrick de Barentzen and Monsieur Giles. In 1964 he started a company with Giles, which lasted for over ten years.

In 1974 he opened his own show room in Rome's piazza di Spagna and in 1979, after his success in haute couture, he presented his first prêt-à-porter collection.

== Biography ==
He was born in Naples but spent his childhood and adolescence in Perrone (Ischia) with his eight siblings; he graduated as a long-distance captain from the Nautical Institute of Procida. As a teenager working in a small store while pursuing his studies, Rino's store, one day a French tourist came in to buy and recognized the young man's talent. It was she who told Patrick de Barentzen and Monsieur Giles about him, and Rocco Barocco, still a minor, moved to Rome in 1962 and began working in the atelier of Patrick de Barentzen and Giles. In 1964 he started a partnership with Giles that was to last ten years.

In 1974 he opened his own studio in Rome Piazza di Spagna, and in 1979, after his successes with haute couture, he presented his first women's Ready-to-wear collection. He is known for his sexy creations, and his awards include the “Silver Mask” for haute couture in 1967, the “Singer” award in New York City as a young designer, and the Pittsburgh award in 1973.

It presents its men's/women's ready-to-wear collections every year in Milan Fashion Week. The brand has licensed its handbag and shoe collections to Milano Fashion, its perfume license to Italart Co, and its watch and costume jewelry license to Watch Up.

== Personal life ==
Rocco Barocco has never married and has an adopted son; he considers himself Roman Catholic.
