= Alviero Martini =

Italian fashion designer (born 1950)

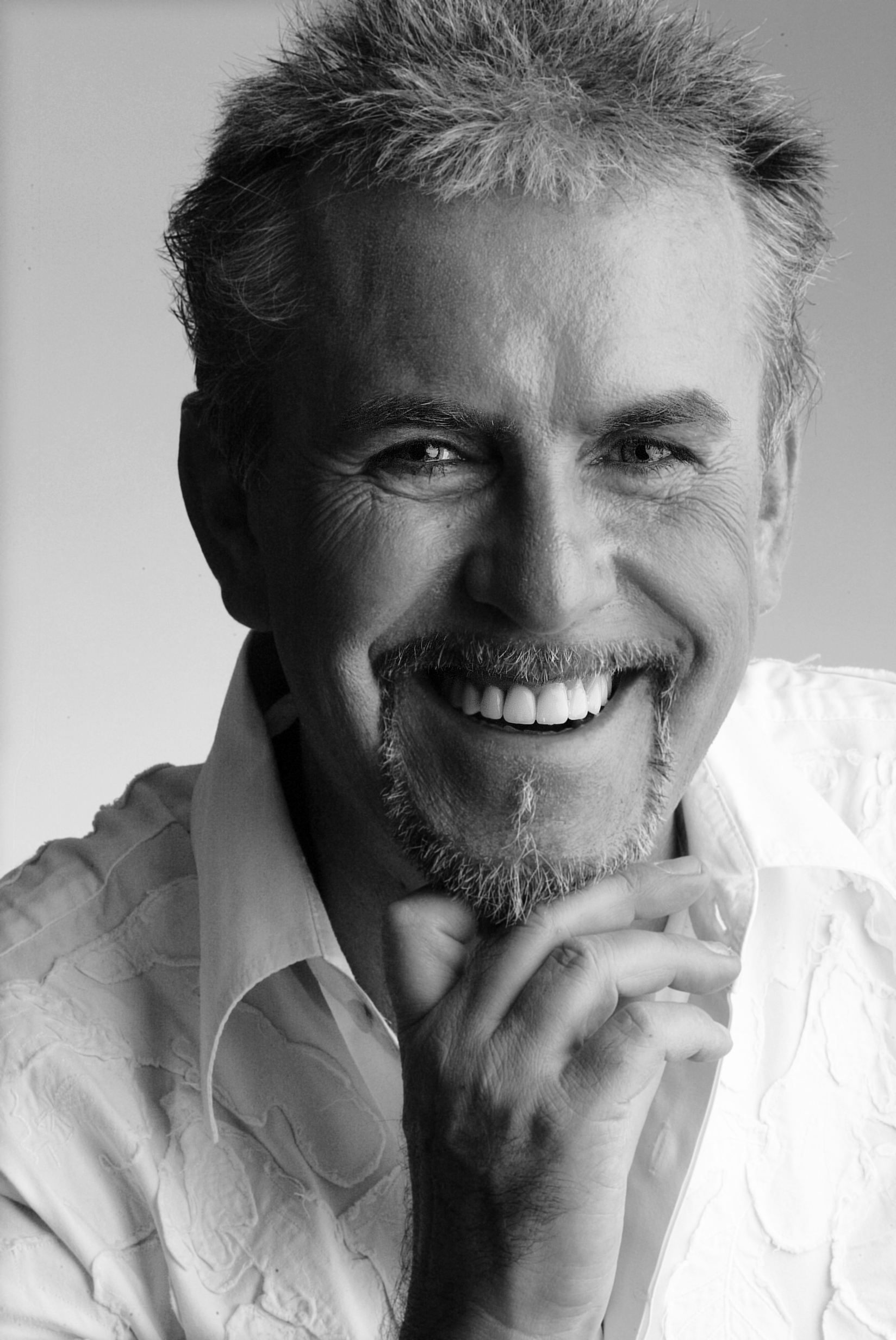
- Martini in 2006
- Born: 1950 (age 75–76); Cuneo, Italy
- Occupation: Fashion designer
- Years active: 1970–present

Alviero Martini (born 1950) is an Italian fashion designer who was born in Cuneo and is known for the 1^{A} Classe range of clothing and accessories, including watches, that is characterised by a "map" motif.

He is currently designing ALV (Andare Lontano Viaggiando) collections of handbags, apparel and accessories with a "passport stamps" motif.

== Early life ==
Martini was born in 1950 in Cuneo, Piedmont.

== Career ==
In his hometown he concluded his artistic studies, Martini started to travel, exporting his handiwork: window setups. He explored different "worlds" by geography and environment, and at the age of 20, with a group of enthusiastic friends the set up a "theatre company", although not professionally, followed by acting and costume designing. He worked with Italian actor Vittorio Gassman, on theatre as well as films and advertising.

With his background as a designer, illustrator, and fashion consultant, and after a few years in interior decoration, Martini was inspired by an antique map, found in a bookstore in Moscow, where he was working on 86/97. He brought the map back to Rome, where he was living at that time, and began thinking about how to transform it into a handbag collection. After two years of research, a presentation to the USA press was deemed a success. He founded the company 1A Classe in 1991.

In 2003, after having financial issues, he decided to partially sell the company to Group Final SpA; then, in 2006, he sold the outstanding part to the Group and left the brand.

Martini then created a brand called ALV for Andare Lontano Viaggiando. ALV is an acronym of his name, but in the Italian language also means andare (going) lontano (far away), viaggiando (travelling). Surrounded by a circle with 5 weave lines, ALV becomes a postmark, sometimes knitted on jacquard or printed in laminated canvas, and the logo for new proposals for international and sophisticated travellers.

ALV is a women's ready-to-wear collection as well as accessories, described as high profile, fashion oriented, which Martini presented to international customers after three years of research. His showroom is located in Milan, in Piazza San Babila.

In January 2024, after being accused of exploiting Chinese workers at their manufacturing operations, the company was forced into judicial administration in Italy.
