= Genny =

Italian ready-to-wear manufacturer

- Type: Subsidiary
- Industry: Fashion
- Founded: 1962; 64 years ago Ancona, Marche, Italy
- Founder: Arnaldo Girombelli, Donatella Girombelli
- Headquarters: Milan, Italy
- Area served: Worldwide
- Key people: Sara Cavazza Facchini, (Creative Director); Mathias Facchini, (CEO)
- Products: Women's ready-to-wear, accessories, Fashion Jewelry, Leather goods, shoes, perfumes, eyewear
- Parent: Swinger International S.p.A.
- Website: www.genny.com

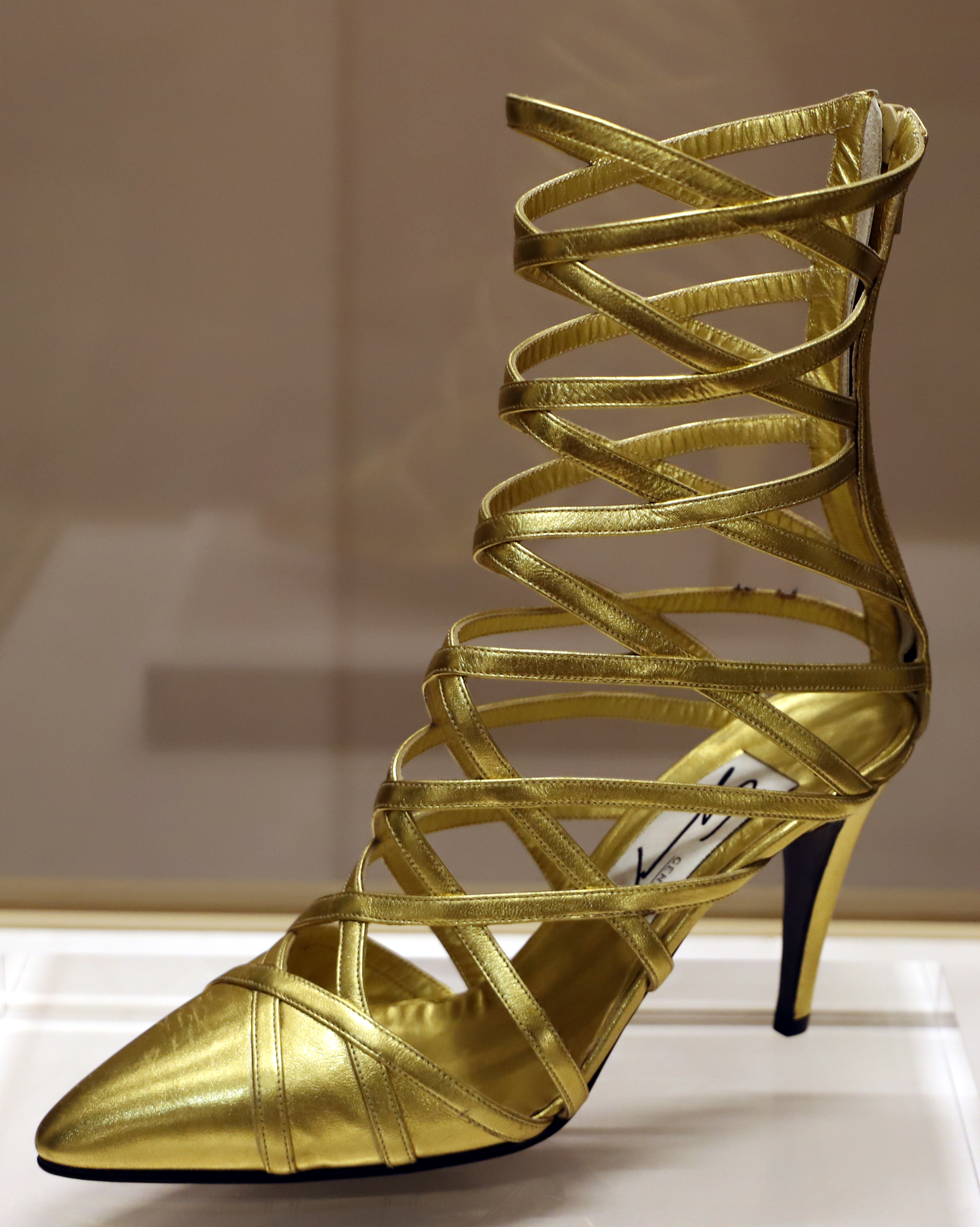

Genny is an Italian ready-to-wear manufacturer founded in Ancona in 1962 by Arnaldo Girombelli.

== History ==
Born in Ancona, Arnaldo Girombelli was the owner of a boutique with an adjacent small tailor workshop for skirts and blouses in his hometown. After gradually expanding the workshop and increasing the number of seamstresses, in 1962 he founded a label for his creations, "Genny", named after his eldest daughter.

In the second half of the 1960s Genny started to have a large success thanks to a line of pleated oblique skirts obtained through a new treatment technique of cloth, then in 1973 it introduced a youthful line, "Byblos", and Gianni Versace became its designer. Later, Guy Paulin and his assistant Christian Lacroix replaced Versace at Byblos, while Versace launched another Genny's experimental line, "Complice". In 1983, Byblos became an independent company. After the death of Girombelli, his wife Donatella became the chairwoman of the group.

== Acquisitions ==
In 2001 Prada acquired the label, and Genny stopped its production in 2004. In 2011 the label was acquired by Swinger International S.p.A., which decided to relaunch the brand and appointed Gabriele Colangelo as the new designer.

== Recognition ==
On 21 July 2018, the brand received Tao Award for fashion during the Taomoda event in Taormina.

== See also ==
- Italian fashion
- Made in Italy
