= Survival store =

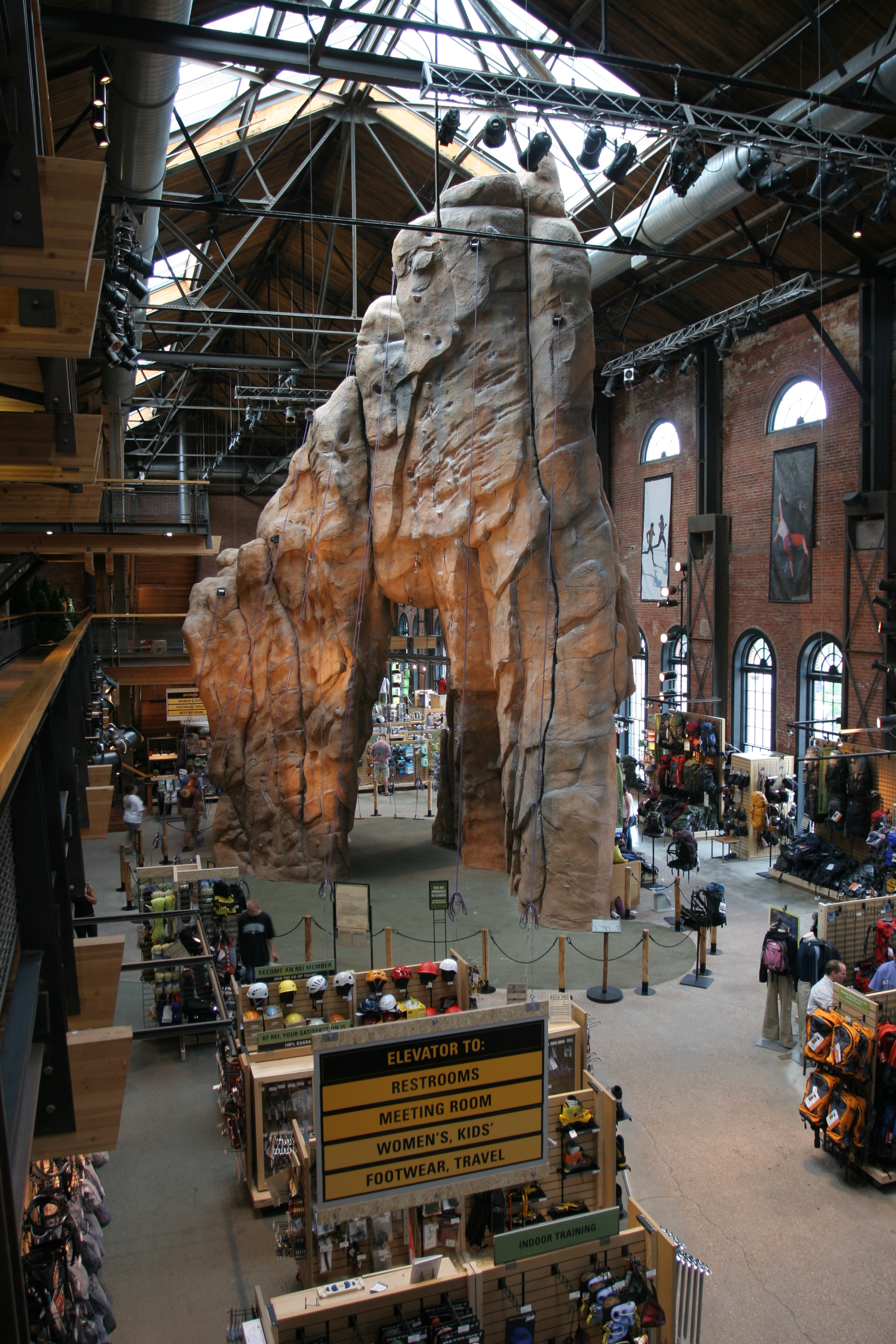
Interior of outdoors store

A survival store is a retail outlet where outdoor survival or preparedness equipment can be purchased. Typically survival stores stock camping and backpacking equipment, long-term storage food, fishing equipment, and occasionally bicycles.

== Terminology ==
It may also be called an outdoors store, preparedness store, or wilderness store.

== Goods ==
Typical goods include:

- Tents
- Sleeping bags
- Storage food (usually dehydrated or freeze dried) with long shelf life
- Electrical generators
- First aid supplies
- MREs (meals ready to eat)
- Wind-up radios
- Wind-up flashlights
- Backpacks

== By market ==
=== Australia ===
Prominent outdoor retailers in Australia include Anaconda, Boating Camping and Fishing, Kathmandu, Macpac, and Mountain Designs.

=== United Kingdom ===
Prominent outdoor retailers in the United Kingdom are GO Outdoors, Decathlon, Sports Direct.

=== United States ===
Prominent outdoor retailers in the United States include Dick's Sporting Goods, Eddie Bauer, Backcountry.com, Outdoor Voices, REI, Patagonia, Marmot, Moosejaw, Sierra, The North Face and L.L.Bean.

== See also ==
- Outdoor retailer
- Surplus store
