= Outdoor retailer =

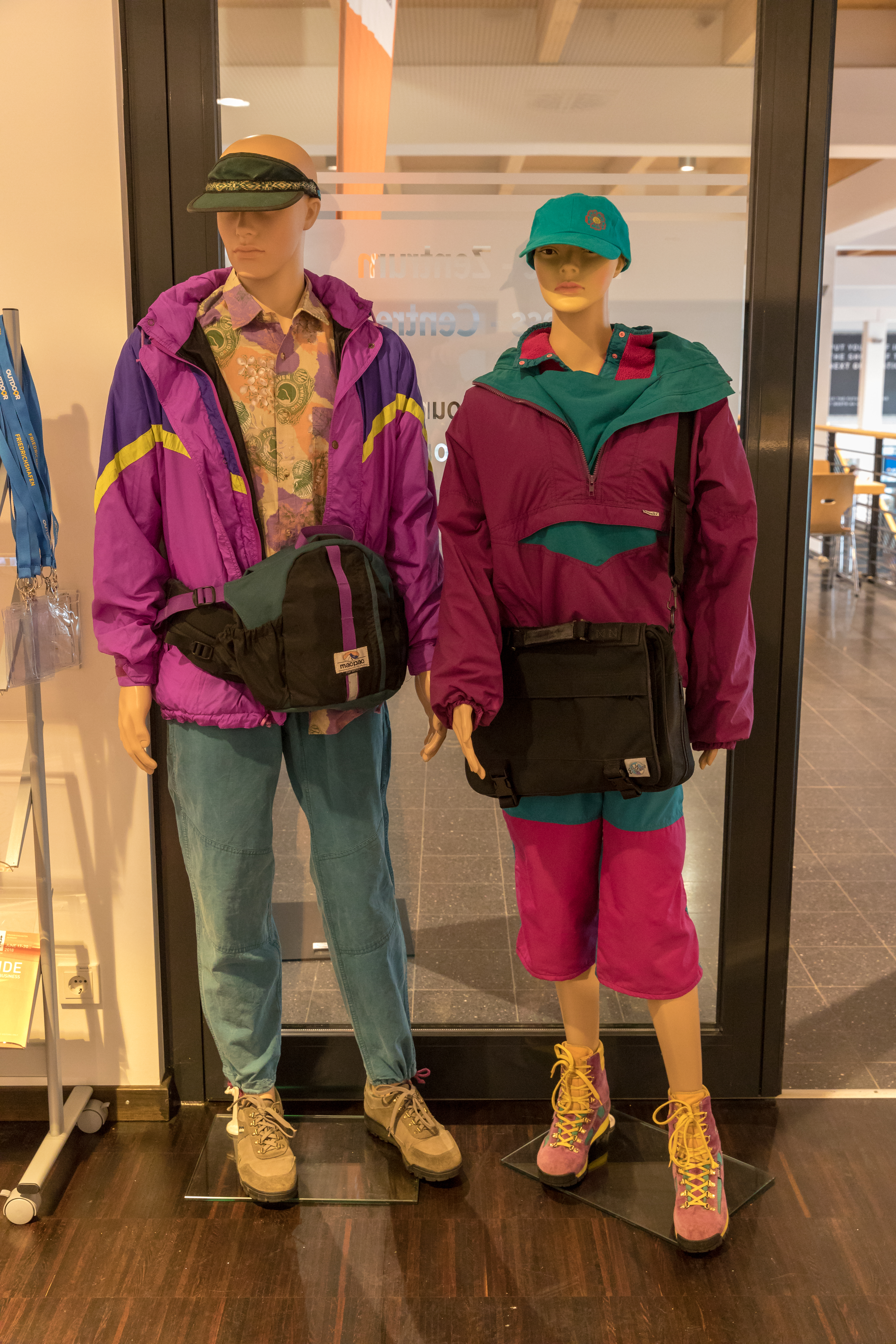
Interior of a Macpac store in New Zealand in 1993.

An outdoor retailer or outdoor store is a retail businesses selling apparel and general merchandise for outdoor activities.

The stores may cater for a range of activities, including camping, hunting, fishing, hiking, trekking, mountaineering, skiing, snowboarding, cycling, mountain biking, kayaking, rafting and water sports. They may carry a range of associated equipment, such as hiking boots, climbing harnesses, snowboards, kayaks, mountain bikes, paddleboards, climbing shoes, and tents.

== History ==
In 2017, the US Outdoor Retailer trade show moved out of Utah over the state's plan to remove the national monument designations for Bears Ears and Grand Staircase–Escalante.

During late 2020 and early 2021, some outdoor retailers experienced a boom from the COVID-19 pandemic, with demand increasing for items like personal watercraft, bicycles, running shoes, hiking shoes, and walking shoes.

In 2022, research in the United States found consumers were planning to spend less at outdoor retailers due to rising costs of living and other prices.

In March 2022, the US Outdoor Retailer trade show announced a move back to Utah beginning in January 2023, despite the state's stance on national monuments. Several major retailers, such as Patagonia, REI, The North Face, threatened to boycott the event.

== By market ==
=== Australia ===
Prominent outdoor retailers in the Australia include Anaconda, Boating Camping and Fishing, Kathmandu, Macpac, Mountain Designs and Snowys Outdoors.

=== United States ===
Prominent outdoor retailers in the United States include Dick's Sporting Goods, Eddie Bauer, Backcountry.com, Outdoor Voices, REI, Patagonia, Marmot, Moosejaw, Sierra, The North Face and L.L.Bean.

== See also ==
- Sporting goods retailer
- Survival store
