= Warriewood Square =

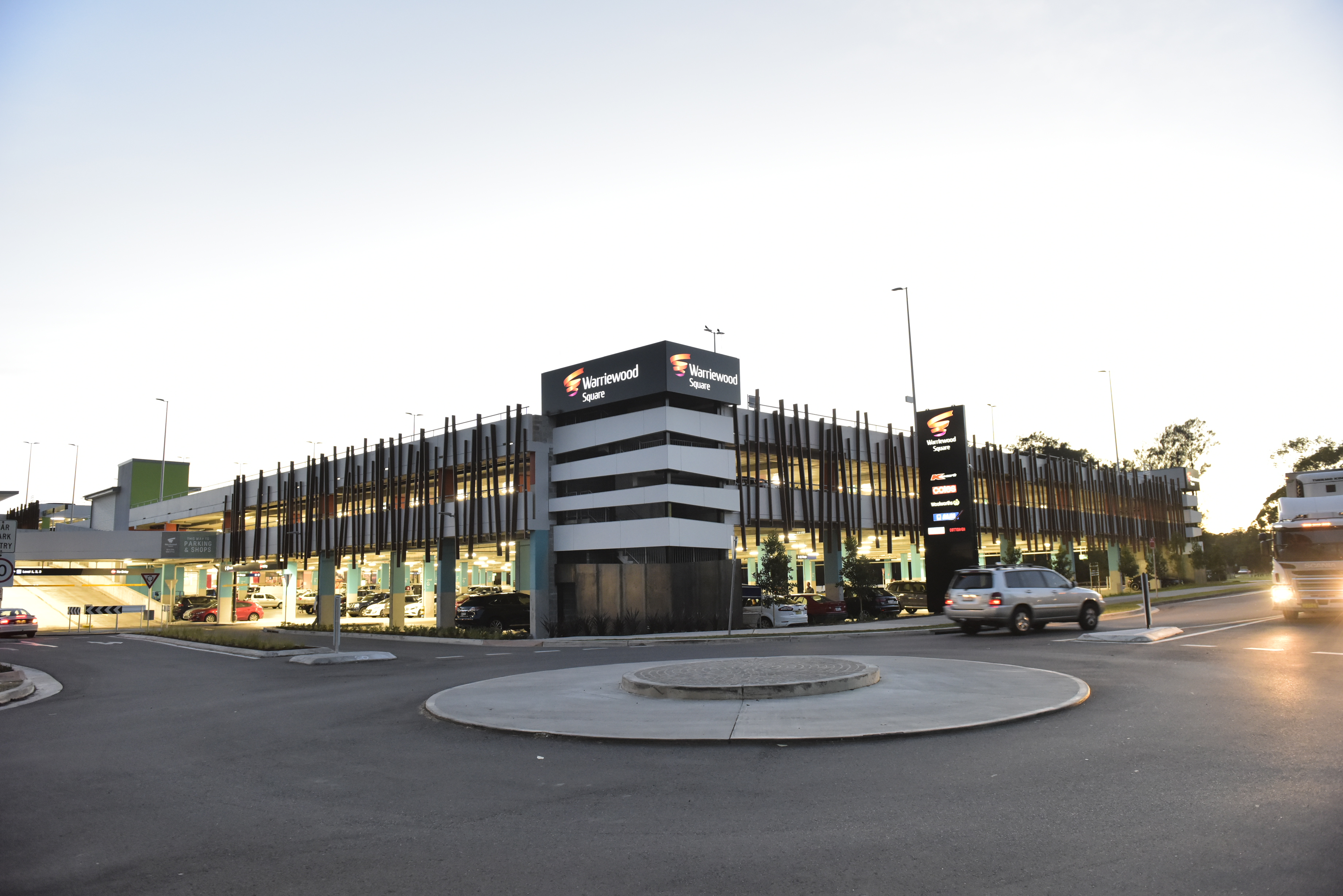
- Warriewood Square
- Location: Warriewood, New South Wales, Australia
- Coordinates: 33°41′45″S 151°17′44″E
- Address: 12 Jacksons Rd, Warriewood NSW 2102
- Opened: 15 April 1980; 46 years ago
- Manager: Vicinity Centres
- Owner: Vicinity Centres (50%); JY Group (50%)
- Num. of stores: 111
- Num. of anchor tenants: 4
- Floor area: 30,323 m^{2} (326,394 sq ft)
- Floors: 1
- Parking: 1,437 spaces
- Public transit: Warriewood B-Line; Jacksons Road
- Website: www.warriewoodsquare.com.au/

Warriewood Square (previously known as Centro Warriewood) is a shopping centre in the suburb of Warriewood in the Northern Beaches region of Sydney.

== Transport ==
Warriewood Square has bus connections to the Sydney CBD and the Northern Beaches, as well as local surrounding suburbs. It is served by Keolis Northern Beaches which includes the B-Line services. The majority of the bus service are located on Jacksons Road and Pittwater Road. There is no railway station at Warriewood; the nearest station is located at Chatswood.

Warriewood Square also has a multi level car park with 1,437 spaces.

== History ==
=== 20th Century ===
==== 1980s: opening ====
Warriewood Square opened on 15 April 1980 and included over 30 stores. The centre included a Kmart, Bi-Lo (later rebranded to Coles), Franklins and 62 specialty stores. The centre has 17,892m² of retail space and 900 car spaces. It was owned by Bankers Trust Australia Ltd and built on the surrounding wetlands.

==== 1990s: sale and redevelopment ====
In October 1990 Bankers Trust Australia Ltd listed Warriewood Square on the market for $33.5 million.

On 7 March 1996 Centro Properties Group purchased Warriewood Square from Bankers Trust Australia Ltd for $38 million and rebranded the centre to Centro Warriewood. However the centre faced a legal battle at that time over the surrounding wetlands. A previous development application had been lapsed which was to expand the centre by 3,500m² on the adjoining land if it was acquired. The adjoining land was at the centre of a long-running dispute between the owner, Sydney property investor Henry Roth, local planning authorities and a conservationist group who wanted to preserve the wetlands.

On 5 July 1999 Centro Properties Group began work on the $20 million redevelopment of Centro Warriewood. This involved the expansion of the total retail floor area to 21,332m². The Coles supermarket was expanded to 3,600m² and the Franklins Fresh supermarket was expanded to 2,197m². A new food court was added to the expansion and 25 specialty stores were added to the centre. The existing areas in the centre were refurbished with natural light and new mall ceilings added and the carpark was also upgraded with new shaded parking areas added. Construction work was done by Multiplex who finished the work by late November in time for the Christmas rush.

=== 21st Century ===
==== 2000s ====
In June 2001 the Franklins supermarket chain was offered for sale. The Centro Warriewood store was one of the 67 stores that were acquired by Woolworths. As a result of the sale, Woolworths closed that Franklins store and rebranded it to its Woolworths supermarket.

==== 2010s: rebranding and redevelopment ====
Centro Properties Group was restructured in 2011 due to financial difficulty and accounting irregularities. As a result of that restructure the company was renamed to Federation Centres in January 2013. In February 2013 Federation Centres signed a $371.4 million co-ownership deal for 50% of four sub-regional shopping centres with Industry Superannuation Property Trust (ISPT). The centre was rebranded back to Warriewood Square on 8 November 2014.

In March 2015 Vicinity Centres began work on the $84 million redevelopment which extended Warriewood Square by 7,500m² and included a new multi-storey carpark. The redevelopment was completed by June 2016 with the grand opening on 23 June 2016. The redevelopment featured a new Aldi supermarket, two mini majors - Amart Sports and Cotton On Mega, a new look Kmart, an expanded Woolworths supermarket, an upgraded food court, around 35 new stores and a multi-storey with additional 1400+ parking spaces.

In October 2017 Amart Sports was rebranded to Rebel as part of the move by Super Retail Group.

In November 2018 JB Hi-Fi opened its store near Woolworths.

==== 2020s ====
In July 2024 ISPT offered its 50% stake on Warriewood Square for sale. The 50% stake was purchased by JY Group for $135.5 million in October 2024.

== See also ==
- List of shopping centres in Australia
