= La Cordée =

Canadian outdoor and sports store chain

La Cordée Plein Air
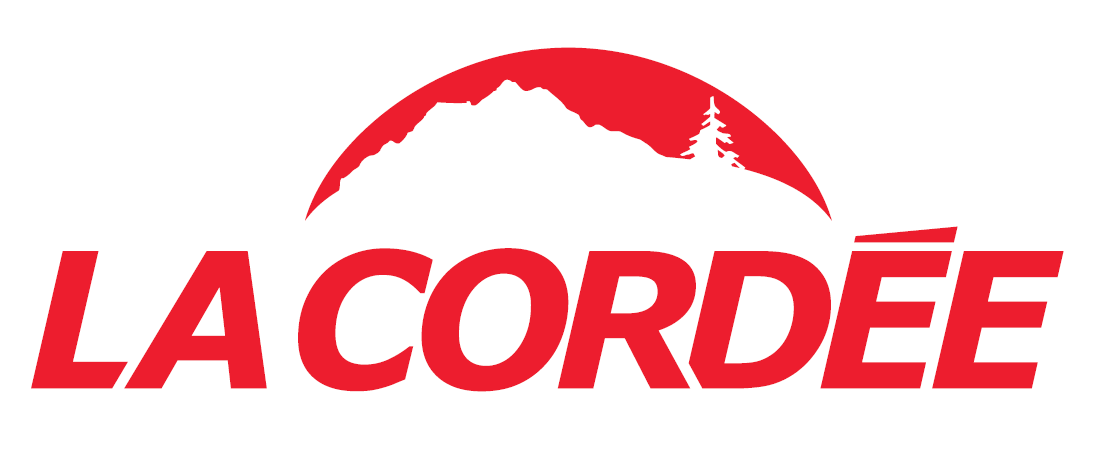
- Industry: Outdoors clothing and equipment
- Founded: 1953
- Headquarters: Montréal, Canada
- Number of locations: 5
- Key people: Cedric Morisset, CEO
- Number of employees: 325
- Parent: Coopérative La Cordée
- Divisions: La Cordée, La Cordée Boutique, La Vie Sportive - La Cordée, MC3
- Website: www.lacordee.com

La Cordée is a Montreal-based chain of outdoor recreation and sports stores established in 1953. The company is the property of two non profit organizations and all its non-reinvested profits are administered by La Fondation scoute La Cordée.

== History ==
In 1953, the first La Cordée store opened as a cooperative at the corner of Berri Street and Sherbrooke Street in Montréal. 20 years later, in 1973, the store moved to 2159, Saint Catherine Street East, where the flagship location exists to this day. In 1983, the owners of the business decided to transfer ownership of the store to two separate non-profit organizations; the Coopérative La Cordée and La Fondation scoute La Cordée.

In 2001, the company expanded its operations with a second store in Laval. A third store opened in 2005 on the South Shore of Montréal, in Saint-Hubert. In 2015, La Cordée acquired Le Yeti, another small outdoor product retailer on Saint-Laurent Boulevard, which they renamed La Cordée Boutique.

In 2018, in an effort to expend outside Greater Montreal, La Cordée acquired La Vie Sportive, a well-established outdoor product retailer in Quebec City.

In 2019, the workers of the two stores located in Montreal decided to unionized with the Commercial Federation of CSN. This unionization is historical being the first among the sports and outdoor retailers of Quebec.

On July 11th, 2026, La Cordée filed for protection under the Bankruptcy and Insolvency Act. In late September, the company announced that it would close its three remaining stores and cease operations.

== La Cordée and the Montreal scouts ==
When La Cordée opened as a cooperative in 1953. Its mission was to provide Montreal's scout troops with uniforms and outdoor equipment at an affordable price. Since 1983, La Cordée has been operated as an incorporated business that donates all its profits to one of its shareholders, La Fondation scoute La Cordée. To this day, more than 4 million dollars have been donated to the organization. La Cordée is the official counter of Montreal's scouts. The company also supports local development and maintenance of outdoor sites with its Retour aux Sources program.
