= Anaconda (retailer) =

Australian outdoor and sporting goods store chain owned by Spotlight Group

- Industry: Retail
- Founded: November 2004; 22 years ago
- Headquarters: Australia
- Number of locations: 88 stores (2025)
- Area served: Australia
- Products: Sporting goods
- Owner: Spotlight Group

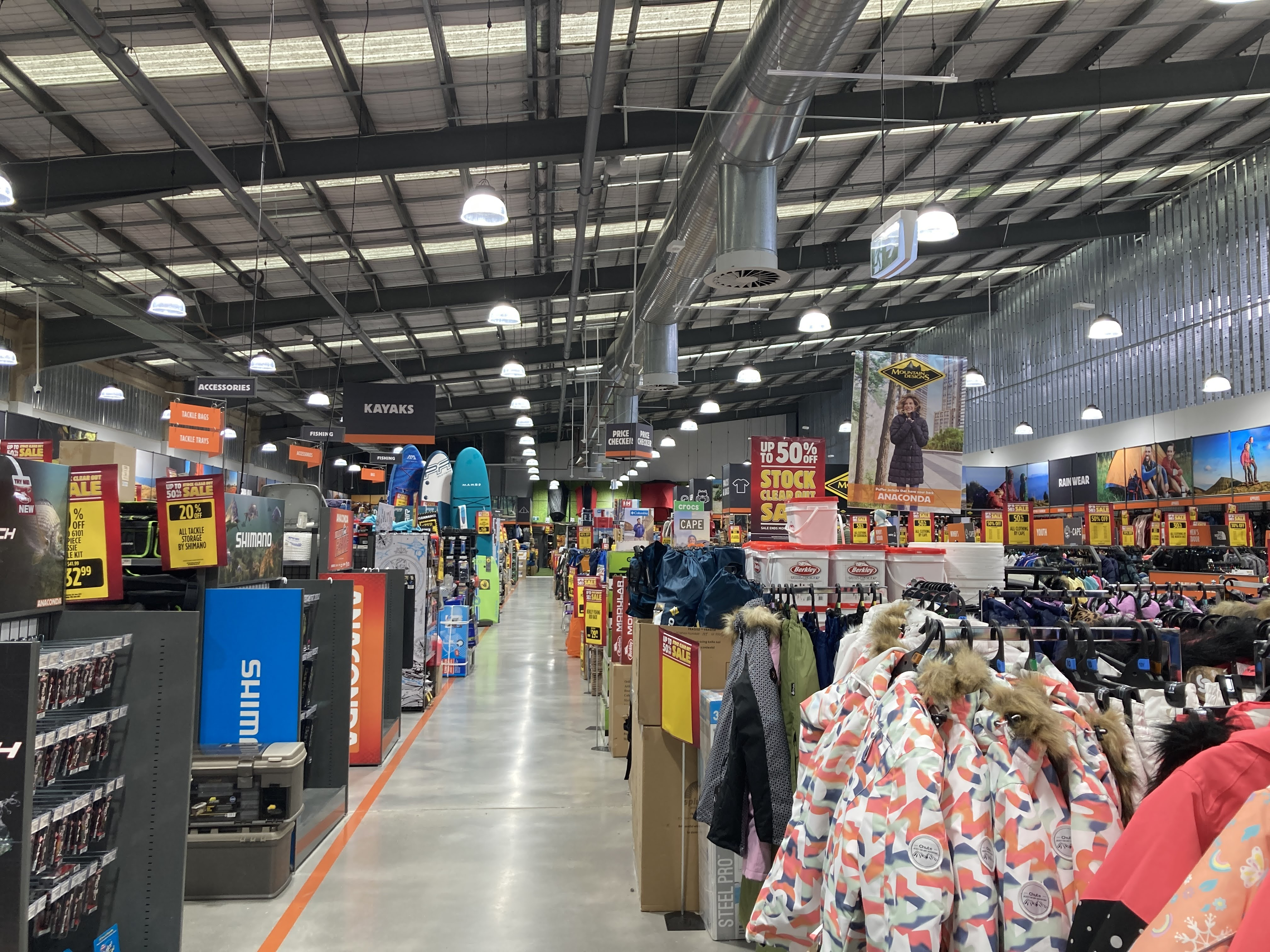
The interior of an Anaconda store in Canberra

Anaconda is an Australian outdoor retailer and sporting goods retailer which sells a wide range of outdoor equipment and apparel in Australia. The range includes camping and hiking equipment, outdoor clothing and apparel, hiking footwear, fishing equipment and clothing, 4WD and caravan equipment, snow equipment and clothing, water sports equipment, beach furniture, boating gear and cycling equipment.

Anaconda, listed as The Trustee for Anaconda Unit Trust in the Australian Business Register and Dun and Bradstreet, is one of several retail businesses comprising the Spotlight Group family of stores.

ZoomInfo lists Anaconda as the second largest outdoor goods retail employer in Australia with 1,200 employees and a revenue of A$760 million annually.

As of May 2023, there are 78 locations across the country.

== History ==
Anaconda was founded in November 2004.

In 2010, nearly six years after the company's founding, Anaconda only had 19 locations nationally.

The first large-format store opened in Sydney in July 2022. Spotlight Group continued to focus on property and physical locations, using interactive experiences to draw customers to physical locations.

In March 2023, the Bundaberg Regional Council approved a measure that allows for Anaconda to construct a store in the Fantastic Furniture and OMF complex, the twenty-first location for Anaconda in Queensland.

Keeping the idea of an immersive shopping experience, CEO Chris Lude has announced plans for an Anaconda Adventure HQ to be opened in Brendale in 2025. It will not only provide the usual retail experience, but will also include what Lude is touting as the world's first barramundi fishing dam inside the complex property. He expects this feature to attract shoppers not only across Australia, but to increase the number of tourists venturing to the Moreton Bay region. The Moreton Bay Regional Council approved construction in August 2022.

== Operations ==
Despite fifteen to twenty percent of Spotlight Group's sales revenue resulting from online sales, the conglomerate continues to pursue opportunities to open physical locations for their various brands.

The company has outlets in Western Australia, Victoria, the Northern Territory, Nowra, Brisbane, Albion Park, Cannonvale, Rockhampton, and Hervey Bay on Fraser Coast.

== Product categories ==
Anaconda sells a broad range of outdoor equipment categories in their retail stores and on their website.

Camping & Hiking Equipment: tents, sleeping bags & sleeping mats, swags, camp furniture, hiking backpacks, hiking poles, camp lighting, portable cookware, portable fridges, and power generators.

Outdoor Clothing, Footwear & Accessories: Hiking shirts, hiking pants & shorts, rain jackets, puffer jackets, fleece clothing, insulated down jackets, thermals, activewear, swimwear & surf wear. Footwear includes hiking boots, trail running shoes, sports shoes, thongs, sandals, slides and clogs.

Fishing Equipment & Clothing: Fishing shirts and hats, fishing rods, fishing reels, fishing line, fishing bait, fishing tools, fishing storage and fishing accessories.

4WD & Caravan Equipment: 4WD recovery gear, roof racks, satellite radios & communications, 4WD lighting, 4WD storage solutions, caravan equipment, portable solar panels, towing accessories, rooftop tents and car awnings.

Snow Equipment & Clothing for Skiing and Snow Boarding: Snow jackets, snow pants, snow boots, snow gloves & mittens, snow helmets, snow goggles and snow socks.

Water Sports Equipment: Kayaks, stand up paddle boards (SUPs), surf boards, paddles, snorkelling gear, pool toys & inflatables and boating accessories.

Beach Furniture: Beach chairs, beach umbrellas, beach trolleys and beach shade tents.

Boating Gear & Accessories: Life jackets (PFDs), outboard motors & fuel, boat electronics, boat fitouts and trailer accessories.

Bikes and Cycling Equipment: Bikes, children's bikes, mountain bikes, electronic scooters, bike racks, bike spare parts, bike helmets and bike accessories.

== Brands within the collection ==
They offer 436 brands. One of those listed is Mountain Designs, a competitor for Anaconda in 2007 and originally based in Brisbane that Spotlight Group acquired on May 3, 2018.

Another former competitor that is listed as a brand on Anaconda's extensive list is Gondwana Outdoor, listed as just Gondwana on Anaconda's site. The company stopped selling through their website sometime between February 4, 2017 and February 18, 2017. Gondwana also actively encouraged its customers to show them what they did on outdoor adventures, hosting the Inspiring Gippsland Walks competition in 2010. They were also a partner with Bush Heritage in 2009, donating $1.50 from the sale of each item containing recycled fleece.

Gondwana directed customers to Rainbird Clothing's website when they closed their online portal. Rainbird is another brand Anaconda sells, though the parent company for both, Textile House, still appears to be in business as a separate entity. Gondwana is listed under "The Trustee for Summit Outdoor Clothing Trust" in Dun and Bradstreet and the Australian Business Register. It is unclear as to whether Spotlight Group acquired these brands as they did Mountain Designs.

Anaconda is an authorised retailer of well known outdoor brands and fishing such as The North Face, Helly Hansen, Garmin, Abu Garcia and Shimano.

== Loyalty program ==
Their Adventure Club loyalty program is unlike the average discount membership program. They not only offer member-only discounts, but also offer nights where the stores are only open to members of the club and occasionally hold competitions and giveaways that only members can enter. In 2008, 2009, and 2010, the company hosted the Anaconda Adventure Racing Series in Western Australia, increasing 'adventure tourism'. As of July 2023, membership in the program is free. Spotlight credits the program as "fundamental to Anaconda's success."

== Awards ==
Anaconda received recognition for their store design and concept in 2023, making the list of finalists, though the award for the category went to BCF.

However, Anaconda did not score well on the annual Ethical Fashion Report in 2022, which assessed 581 brands. Alongside Harris Scarfe and Mountain Designs, also owned by Spotlight, Anaconda received a score of 1/100.

== See also ==
- Anaconda (2025 film)
- List of mountaineering equipment brands
- List of outdoor industry parent companies
