= Sporting goods retailer =

Type of retail business

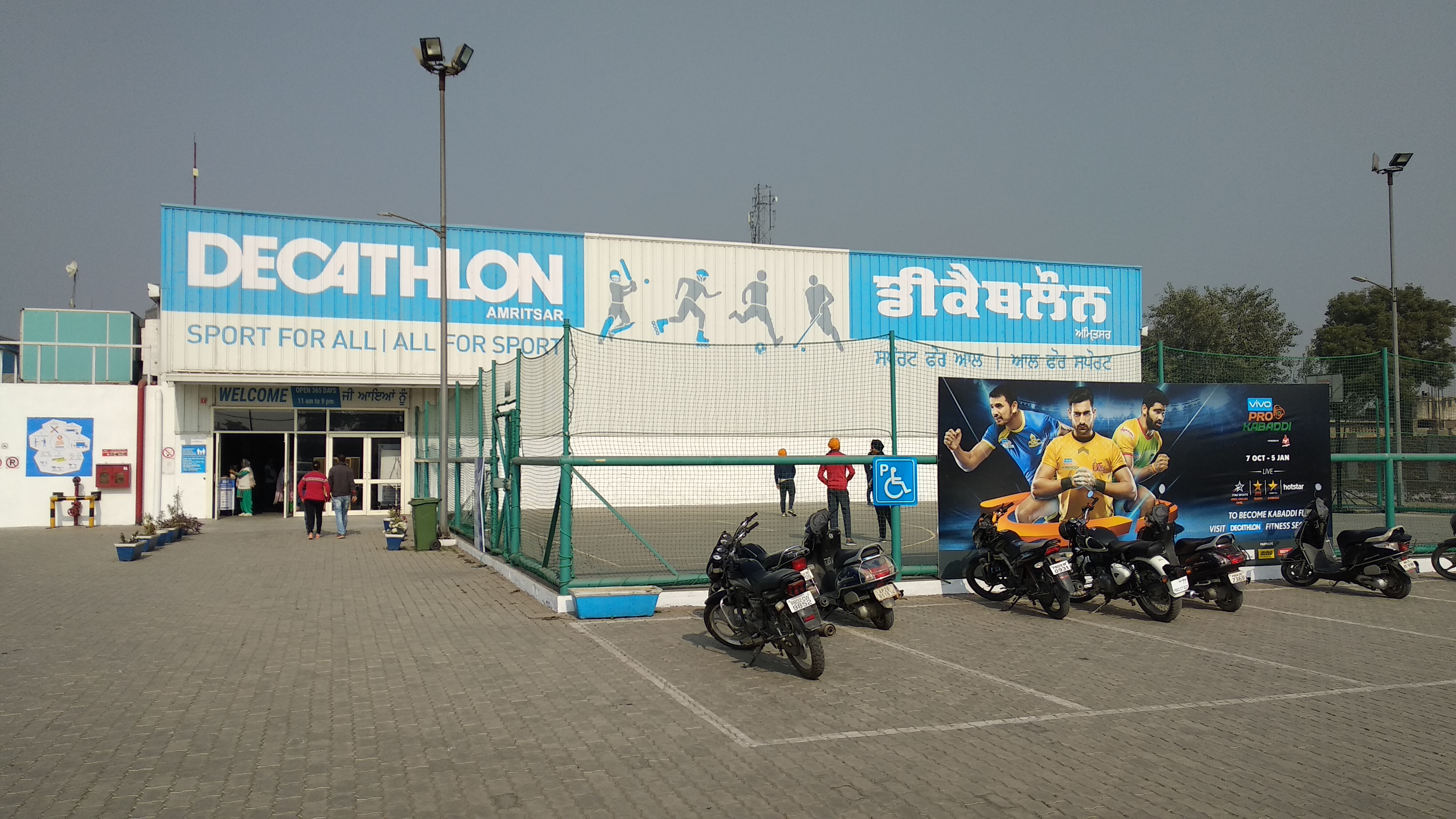
Decathlon store in Amritsar, India.

A sporting goods retailer or sporting goods store is a retail business selling sporting and recreational goods, including sportswear, sporting equipment and related general merchandise.

== History ==
Decathlon, the world's largest sporting good retail chain, opened its first store in Lille, France, in 1976. It now has about 1700 stores in 60 countries and territories.

The sector contracted globally in 2007 and 2008, due to the loss of disposable income during the 2008 financial crisis.

The sector contacted again in 2020, outside China, due to restrictions on outdoor and team sports during the COVID-19 pandemic. Many brands, retailers, and manufacturers failed to return a profit, and many households reduced physical activity due to reduced disposable income. However, demand for sportwear and indoor fitness equipment remained high. The sector experienced significant growth in the immediate aftermath of the pandemic.

In 2021, McKinsey & Company identified a shift away from conventional bricks and mortar retail to online shops requiring more agile supply chains and experiential retail offering unique experiences. In the United States, Dick's Sporting Goods began trialling concept stores with specialties, or in-store experiences like golf putting green, wellness experts, yoga classes, rock climbing, batting cages, and equipment repair services.

In the same report, McKinsey & Company also identified a strong market for sportswear, which was becoming both more lucrative and more competitive. This was partly due to the blurring of lines between active wear and casual wear.

Also in 2021, Mintel has identified three potential growth areas: women's sporting goods; men's sportswear; and the marketing of premium brands, particularly to parents.

In 2022, research in the United States found consumers were planning to spend less at sporting goods retailers due to rising costs of living and other prices.

== By market ==
=== Australia ===
Prominent Sporting goods retailers in the Australia include 99 Bikes, Anaconda, Boating Camping and Fishing, Kathmandu, Macpac, Mountain Designs Rebel and Snowys Outdoors.

=== China ===
In China, the sector expanded at an average rate of 16.5% a year from 2015 to 2019. The sector continued to grow in the Chinese market during the COVID-19 pandemic, due to increased physical activity by the country's growing middle class.

=== United States ===
In the United States, Walmart and Dick's Sporting Goods are the largest sporting goods retailers. Walmart recorded $9.8 billion in sporting goods revenue in 2015; Dick's recorded $6.9 billion in revenue.

== By sports ==
=== Golf ===
Prominent golf equipment retailers in the United States include Worldwide Golf Shops, 2ndSwingGolf, Edwin Watts Golf, Golf Galaxy, PGA Tour Superstore, and Rock Bottom Golf.

== See also ==
- Clothing retailer
- Outdoor retailer
