= Rays (retailer) =

Australian outdoor equipment and clothing retailer

Ray's Outdoors
- Industry: Retail
- Founded: 1958; 67 years ago Geelong, Australia
- Defunct: 2018; 7 years ago
- Fate: Merged with Macpac
- Successor: Macpac
- Headquarters: Australia
- Number of locations: 38 stores (2010)
- Owner: Super Retail Group

Rays was an Australian chain of retail stores, selling camping, hiking and kayaking equipment, as well as outdoor clothing and footwear.

Prior to its acquisition by Super Retail Group in 2010, it operated 38 stores across Australia.

== History ==
=== Early years ===
It was founded as Ray's Tent City in Geelong in 1958 by Ray Frost, as a single camping and army disposal store.

It rebranded as Ray's Outdoors in 2003.

=== Super Retail Group takeover ===
The chain was then acquired by the Super Retail Group in 2010, which said 12 of the 38 former Ray's Outdoors outlets would be converted to BCF (Boating Camping and Fishing) stores, an existing Super Retail Group business, and a further 15 would be converted to a new Rays brand. Beginning in about April 2018, after an unsuccessful rebrand, several Rays stores were closed, with the profitable ones becoming Macpac Adventure Hubs, using the name of the New Zealand chain recently acquired by the Super Retail Group. Unlike Macpac stores, Adventure Hubs stocked brands Ray's Outdoors was renowned for selling. They combined the Macpac range of technical outdoor gear, with a selection of apparel, equipment and accessories from some of the world's leading brands: Patagonia, Columbia, Keen, Sea to Summit, Yeti, Scarpa, Coleman, Weber and Wanderer.

== Operations ==
=== Defunct store formats ===
- Ray's Tent City
- Ray's Outdoors
- Rays
