= George P. Harris =

- Born: George Peter Harris c. 1822; Truro, Cornwall, England
- Died: 26 November 1873 (aged 52-53); Shooters Hill, south east London, England, United Kingdom
- Occupations: Retail company founder, company director
- Known for: co-founder of Harris Scarfe
- Relatives: George Scarfe

George Peter Harris (c. 1820 – 26 November 1873) was the co-founder of the South Australian company that became Harris Scarfe.

== History ==
Harris left England on the ship Candahar for South Australia in 1848, arriving at Port Adelaide in February 1849. (Note: He should not be confused with his contemporary, Peter George Harris, wine merchant of Leigh Street, who chartered the brig Louisa to carry a large consignment of wine and other goods from Guernsey to Adelaide. later insolvent. He was in 1864 secretary of the Vinegrowers' Association and had an office in Hindley Street.)

Harris was born in Truro, Cornwall in about 1822. He was baptised on 21st Apr 1822 in the Parish of St Mary's, Truro. His parents were watchmaker George Harris and Jane. Fellow-passengers included his business partner John Charles Lanyon, but also George Scarfe, who would years later be a partner, but whether he was known to the others is open to conjecture. Scarfe was not an emigrant at this stage; he would make a second voyage on the Frances Henty some four years later and their famous partnership a few years later still.

Lanyon and Harris's first shipments arrived within a month and they set up shop as ironmongers at 43 Hindley Street opposite the "Black Bull" hotel. Their partnership was dissolved in March 1855, and Lanyon left South Australia by the barque Iris for London, where he started in business as a purchasing agent, servicing Harris and other Australian merchants.

In 1864 Harris established a second store at Gawler Place, while Scotsman William Fraser and another employee, George Scarfe, ran the Hindley Street business as Scarfe & Fraser. They began selling off stock at discounted prices in March 1866 and the partnership was dissolved in August of that year, when it was revealed Harris had been a silent partner. Harris and Scarfe formed the partnership George P. Harris, Scarfe, & Co. in December 1866, at 58-60 Gawler Place, midway between Rundle and Grenfell streets, much later the site of Allan's music store. Around that time Richard Smith, their diligent salesman, was made a partner and their managing director.

Harris and family left Adelaide by SS Balclutha on 14 January 1867, for Melbourne, and thence to London. He died six years later at "Castle House", Shooter's Hill, London.

== Other interests ==
- He was prominent in the 1864 establishment of the Jubilee Wesleyan Methodist church in Kent Town, and a dedicated worshipper and supporter. He funded the purchase of its first pipe organ. opened 24 October 1873. He was a Circuit Steward of the Wesleyan Methodist Church.
- He served as Alderman for the Robe ward of Adelaide City Council for the year 1860 but resigned the following year.
- He was in 1866 a director of the Bank of Adelaide and one of five Adelaide directors of the English, Scottish & Australian Bank (with Henry Ayers, Thomas Magarey, Robert Barr Smith and T. G. Waterhouse.
- He was a founding director of the South Australian Gas Company with Ayers, Arthur Blyth, Thomas Graves, and George Young.
- He was also a generous supporter of Prince Alfred College, which was founded in 1869 by the Methodist church as a school for sons of well-to-do Protestants.

== Recognition ==
A memorial plaque bearing his name was installed in the Wesleyan Jubilee Church, Kent Town.

== Family ==
Harris married Caroline Fisher ( – 27 March 1920), sister of Daniel Fisher, at North Adelaide on 14 November 1854. They had two children:

- Louisa Caroline Harris (30 August 1855 – 1 May 1895)
- George Stanley Harris (21 June 1860 – )
