= Richard Smith (businessman) =

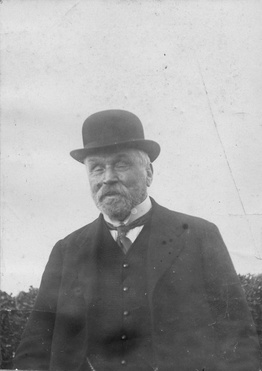
Richard Smith-CEO Harris Scarfe

Richard Smith (27 July 1836 (Note: An earlier reference gives his YOB as 1839) – 27 March 1919) was a partner and managing director of the Adelaide, South Australia, firm of George P. Harris, Scarfe & Co., later known as Harris Scarfe. His son Harold Law-Smith was prominent in the history of the company.

== History ==
Smith was born in Westerham or Brasted, Kent, son of William Smith and Ann Smith, née Solomon. He received a good education and worked for a firm of ironmongers in Coventry.

He came to South Australia in June 1863 aboard the Countess of Fife, under engagement to the firm of George P. Harris of Hindley Street, (Note: The business was Lanyon & Harris until 1855, when the founder John C. Lanyon left for London) and transferred to Gawler Place in 1864. Smith was employed as a travelling salesman, serving customers in the rapidly developing districts of the South East and Yorke Peninsula. Smith was the ideal man for the job — knowledgeable, tireless and reliable, ever on the lookout for fresh fields to conquer, yet not one for self-aggrandizement — and was taken on as a partner in 1866. Around this time Harris also took on George Scarfe as a partner, and the business became Geo. P. Harris, Scarfe, & Co. in December 1866, with Smith as managing director. The company never looked back, but grew into one of the largest firm of traders in the Southern Hemisphere, with a reputation for good products and a fair deal.

Around December 1918 Smith's health began to fail, and only attended his office intermittently, then died after a few weeks' incapacity. The funeral took place on 28 March 1919 and his remains interred in the family vault, Brighton Cemetery. (Note: Though Church of England property, the churchyard adjacent St Jude's church was properly known as Brighton Cemetery until 1930.)

== Other interests ==
From the 1890s Smith was involved with other commercial concerns. He was a director of

- Mutual Life Insurance Company of Australasia
- Executor Trustee and Agency Co. of South Australia
- United Insurance Co. of Australasia
- Stannary Hills Mining Co.
- Adelaide Rope, Nail, and Barbed Wire Co.
- Adelaide Chemical and Fertiliser Co.

and was a

- foundation and life member of the SA Commercial Travellers' Association Inc. (Note: From 1890 known as South Australian Commercial Travellers and Warehousemen's Association Inc.)
- councillor with the Town of Glenelg and Mayor in the three terms 1893 to 1895
- fine tennis player and in later life an enthusiastic bowler, one of the mainstays of the Glenelg club
- contributor to patriotic causes during the Great War
- sponsor of the Soldiers' Memorial Hall at St Peter's College
- breeder of high-grade Shropshire sheep at "Sweetholme", his 1,200 acres (490 ha) property at Strathalbyn.
- breeder of shorthorn cattle at "Nomgetty" station of 35,000 acres (14,000 ha) in Western Australia.

== Recognition ==
A window in St Peter's Cathedral, Adelaide was dedicated to his memory

== Family ==
Richard Smith (born 1836) married Emma Law (1844 – 13 March 1918), daughter of John Law (died 1887?) on 20 March 1869. They had a home "Woodlands" at Partridge-street, Glenelg. They had five daughters and five sons, many of whom used "Law Smith" as a though it were a surname:

- Bertha Law Smith (4 Feb 1870 – 1947) married Harold Charles Downer (1865 – 1921) on 17 February 1909. He was a son of Henry Edward Downer ( –1905), lived at "Sweet Home Farm", Strathalbyn
- Edith Smith (10 December 1871 – 22 August 1947)
- Harold Law Smith (31 December 1973 – 1955) (director of Harris, Scarfe & Co.) living at Glenelg in 1953
- Percival "Percy" Law Smith (11 July 1875 – ) married Violet Hilda Shenton, daughter of Sir George Shenton on 10 January 1907. He was manager of the Perth branch of Harris, Scarfe, later living in Melbourne.
- Gertrude Emma Law Smith (1876 –1941 ) married William Margary Hole ( – ) on 27 August 1904, lived in Adelaide.
- Mabel Law Smith (1878 – ) married (later Sir) Herbert Sydney Hudd (25 February 1881 – 30 April 1948) on 7 May 1919, living at Glenelg in 1953
- (Richard) Edgar Law Smith (29 May 1881 – )
- Walter Henry Law Smith (7 Feb 1883 – 18 December 1953) married Agnes Giles on 2 December 1909
- (Charles) Gordon Law Smith (23 June 1885 – 24 April 1960) fought in Palestine, married Molly Hawkes on 9 March 1920; lived at Gawler.
- Catherine Ellen "Nelly" Law Smith (died 26 December 1946) married Max W. Cooksey (died May 1938), lived in Sussex. She was a champion golfer.
