= George Scarfe =

- Born: c. 1826; Plymouth, England, United Kingdom
- Died: 14 April 1903
- Occupation: Merchant
- Known for: Co-founder of Harris Scarfe with George P. Harris (as George P. Harris, Scarfe and Co.)

George Scarfe (c. 1826 – 14 April 1903) was an English-born merchant in Adelaide, South Australia, a partner in the firm of George P. Harris, Scarfe, & Co., later known as Harris Scarfe. Scarfe was called a "genius of commerce", he was largely credited with the firm's early success and gained great personal wealth. His brother T. R. Scarfe (1843–1915), nephew F. G. Scarfe (1867–1961) and Frederick George's son-in-law C. C. Deeley were prominent in the 20th century development of the company.

== Biography ==
Scarfe first arrived in South Australia in February 1849 aboard Candahar from Plymouth, English presumably to assess the business opportunities in the new British colony. John C. Lanyon and George P. Harris, who were in business together, were fellow-passengers, but it is not known whether he was then an associate. Scarfe returned to Britain at some not-too-distant date, perhaps as their London agent, as he was back at Port Adelaide aboard Frances Henty in July 1853.

He was soon employed by Lanyon & Harris at 43 Hindley Street, but in what capacity and for how long is not clear. Lanyon, the founder, left in February 1855, and Harris ran the business as George P. Harris & Co. for some years. By January 1856 Scarfe had started a grocery business at Port Adelaide. He established a domestic hardware store Scarfe & Burden at Kadina in 1861, and sold his share to Robert Burden in October 1866. Scarfe also assisted his brothers Alfred and Augustus to establish the firm of ironmongers A & A. T. Scarfe at the Port, from which George Scarfe bowed out in December 1866. Scarfe's involvement with Harris during this time is not clear but may have been extensive.

Around 1864 Harris began establishing a store at 58-60 Gawler Place (later Allan's building, currently Allans Billy Hyde), leaving Scotsman William Fraser to run the Hindley Street establishment with Scarfe as assistant, then as partnership Scarfe & Fraser. They began selling off their stock at a discount over six months in 1866, giving early termination of the lease as the reason. That partnership was dissolved in August 1866, and Harris, who had been a silent partner, founded George P. Harris, Scarfe, & Co. in December 1866 at Gawler Place; and in 1869 adding their salesman Richard Smith as partner and managing director.

He lived alone as a guest of the elegant York Hotel, corner of Rundle and Pulteney streets, until around 1880 when he purchased the large property near Stonyfell and Burnside, named "Wattle Park", where he took a keen interest in his orchard and flower beds. He enjoyed vigorous good health, and never missed a day's work until the last year of his life, when in February 1903 it began to break down, and he took to his bed. For the first time in his working life he was not the first to arrive and the last to leave. He recovered somewhat, and was back in action around 1 April 1903, but a week or so later declined rapidly and died at his home, attended by Dr. J. C. Verco.

His remains were interred in the Scarfe family vault, North Road Cemetery.

== Other business interests ==
Scarfe played no part in public affairs, but was involved in other commercial interests. He was a director of:

- Port Adelaide Dock Company
- South Australian Gas Company
- the old South Australian Insurance Company
- Wallaroo Phosphate Company
- South Australian Mining Association

== Family ==
"Two of his brothers. Messrs: Alfred and Augustus Scarfe, are dead, another is in America, and Messrs Charles C. Scarfe and T. R. Scarfe reside in this State. The latter gentleman lives at Eden Park, Marryatville, and is one of the directors of the firm of Messrs. George P. Harris, Scarfe, & Co. Two sisters survive him, both residing in England. One is the wife of Mr. F. N. Scarfe, a very early colonist, who was once Mayor of Norwood. The other is unmarried. The remains of Mr. Scarfe will be buried in the family vault at the North-road Cemetery."

His estate was sworn not to exceed £800,000. Brothers Charles Claxon Scarfe of Norwood and Thomas Roger Scarfe of Adelaide were his executors. Provision was made for ten cottages, to be known as "Scarfe Homes" for the use of industrious indigent aged workers and widows. Provision was made for various family members. The estate being considerable, it attracted attention from the legal fraternity on behalf of relatives who had been left out. Siblings and others mentioned in reference to the will were:

- Alfred Scarfe (c. 1832 – 4 May 1881) had a business at Port Adelaide with brother Augustus.
- Charles Claxon Scarfe (c. 1835 – 8 September 1903) married Anne or Ann Birrell (c. 1847 – 4 September 1887) on 3 July 1866. He left a substantial sum to his family.

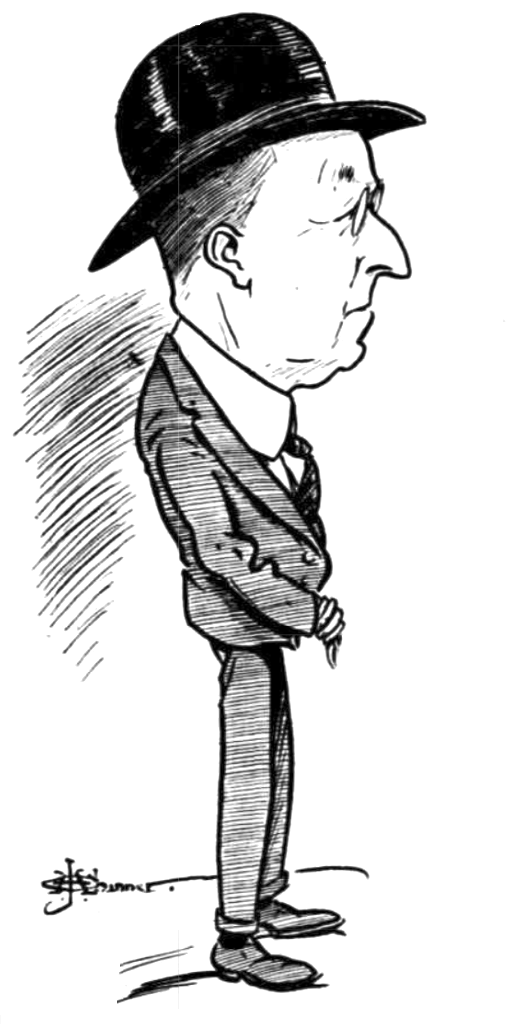
Frederick George Scarfe; caricature by J. H. Chinner

- (Claxon Alexander) Frederick George Scarfe (1 May 1867 – 18 March 1961) was a director in 1925, manager in 1929, married Mary Florence Birrell (c. 1872 – 16 September 1931) on 27 March 1895; lived Victoria Ave, Unley Park.

- Audrey Howard Scarfe married Charles Clifford Deeley (4 March 1892 – 28 October 1975) in 1920. He was actively involved in the firm.

- Alfred Augustus Scarfe (died 28 July 1944) married Emma Elizabeth Lyons on 3 January 1895 lived "Kenilworth", Beulah-road, and in 1903 purchased his late uncle's property "Wattle Park" at auction.

- Augustus Thomas Scarfe (20 April 1838 – 12 May 1896). His name is on the Scarfe memorial, North Road cemetery.
- Frederick Scarfe, about whom nothing has been found; perhaps the American brother mentioned above
- Francis Scarfe (died before GS) married and had five daughters and one son
- Thomas Roger Scarfe (30 March 1843 – 19 March 1915) married Teresa Mary Gertrude Birrell (died 3 August 1942) in 1895. Actively involved in the firm, he died a wealthy man, leaving considerable sums to a range of Catholic and other charitable institutions.
- Louisa C. S. I. Scarfe married Frederick Norman Scarfe in 1850. He may have been a cousin, but his family connection is not known. He was mayor of Kensington and Norwood in 1861.
- Eliza Ann Fuller (née Scarfe) had four daughters; died before GS.
- sister Ellen Laura Scarfe, perhaps the unmarried sister in London mentioned above
- sister Frances Walters (née Scarfe)

Other relations mentioned in his will or in the legal proceedings which followed:

(cousin) Frederick Norman Scarfe married Mary (died 21 June 1865) in 1850. His son George Norman Scarfe married cousin Flora Scarfe of Clapham Common on 2 June 1898
(nephew) Frederick George Alexander Scarfe
(nephew) Herbert Ernest Scarfe married Adelaide Scarfe, of Finchley, London on 23 September 1899
(nephew) Norman Scarfe
(nephew) Roland Scarfe
(niece) Mrs Francis Walters
(niece) Flora Scarfe

== Later history ==
The firm of Harris, Scarfe & Company continued to trade profitably through to the 1970s as a conservative Rundle Street department store with a greater emphasis on hardware than nearby competitors John Martin's, Foy's and Myer's, then became the target and vehicle of entrepreneurs.

Scarfe's property "Wattle Park" became the Adelaide suburb Wattle Park, and his residence became Wattle Park Teachers' College in 1957, closed 1973. Renamed "Scarfe House", it became in 1991 the centrepiece of "Wattle Grove" retirement village for Southern Cross Homes.

Scarfe's bequest provided for the construction of ten cottages for economic rental by workers who had fallen on hard times. These were built in 1906 at Gertrude Street, Norwood as the "Scarfe Cottage Homes", since refurbished and now the "Scarfe Court Retirement Village".

The family vault, which George Scarfe commissioned at the North Road cemetery following the death of his brother Alfred, was resumed by the cemetery trust in 1980 and replaced with a granite memorial, on which his name and year of death appear last, almost as an afterthought.
