= Bank of Adelaide =

Defunct Australian bank

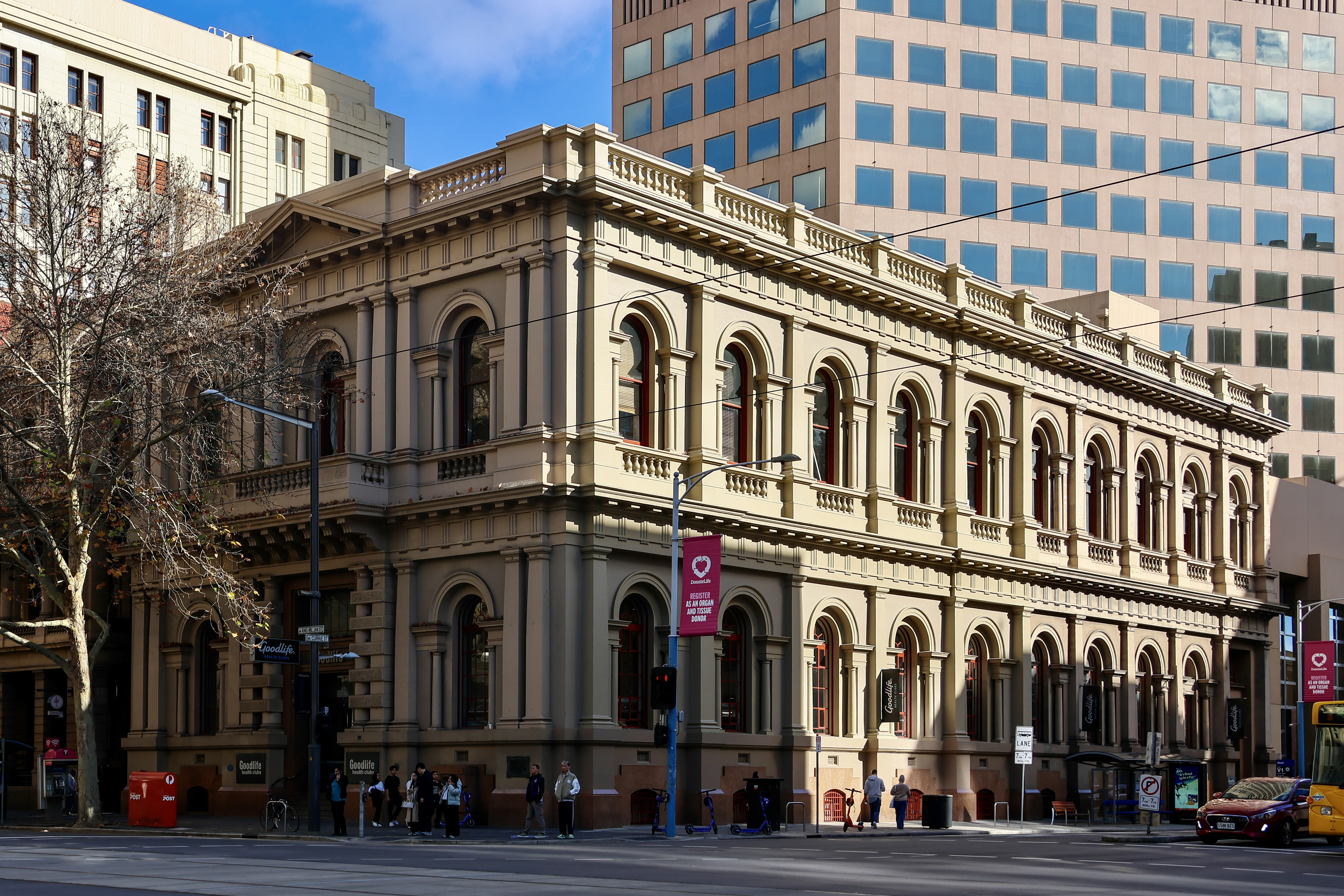
- The former head office on King William Street
- Type: Bank
- Industry: Banking
- Founded: 1865
- Defunct: 1979
- Fate: Acquired by ANZ
- Successor: ANZ
- Headquarters: 81 King William Street, Adelaide, South Australia, Australia
- Key people: Henry Ayers; Thomas Greaves Waterhouse; Robert Barr Smith; Thomas Magarey; George Peter Harris
- Services: Financial services
- Subsidiaries: Finance Corporation of Australia

The Bank of Adelaide was an Australian bank founded in 1865 in Adelaide, the capital of South Australia. It was incorporated by the Bank of Adelaide Act 1865, an act of the Parliament of South Australia. The original directors of the company were Henry Ayers, Thomas Greaves Waterhouse, Robert Barr Smith, Thomas Magarey and George Peter Harris.

The bank had most of its branches within South Australia, including its head office at 81 King William Street, Adelaide. Interstate branches were located in Sydney NSW, Belconnen ACT, Canberra ACT, Brisbane, Dandenong VIC, Hobart TAS, Melbourne VIC, Townsville QLD, Woden ACT. The bank also had a branch in central London at 11 Leadenhall Street.

The Bank of Adelaide was taken over in 1979 by ANZ and merged into that organisation, after bailing out a subsidiary finance company (the Finance Corporation of Australia) that had lent too much to people without the security to cover the loans.

== Arms ==
Coat of arms of Bank of Adelaide
Notes Crest On a Wreath of the Colours issuant from an Ancient coronet a Star of eight points Or. Escutcheon Argent two pallets Azure on a chief Gules four bezants and in sinister base a star of eight points Or. Supporters On the dexter side a Kangaroo and on the sinister side a Lion guardant Gules each gorged with a Chain, pendent therefrom a Key Or. Motto Fide et Fortitudine
