= Spotlight Group =

Australian retail conglomerate

Spotlight Group Holdings
- Company type: Holding company
- Industry: Retail
- Founded: 1973; 53 years ago
- Founders: Morry Fraid and Ruben Fried
- Headquarters: South Melbourne, Victoria, Australia
- Number of locations: 305 stores List: 146 Spotlight; 95 Anaconda; 64 Harris Scarfe; (2026)
- Areas served: Australia, New Zealand, Singapore
- Brands: Spotlight, Anaconda, Mountain Designs, Harris Scarfe
- Website: spotlightgroup.com

Spotlight Group Holdings Pty Ltd (SGH) is an Australian retail conglomerate and one of the country's largest private companies. Its Spotlight Retail Group division operates fabric and craft store chain Spotlight, outdoor retailers Anaconda and Mountain Designs, and department store chain Harris Scarfe. The first Spotlight store was established in Melbourne in 1973 by brothers Morry Fraid and Ruben Fried.

== History ==
The Spotlight Group was founded by Ruben and Vivienne Fried in 1973. Ruben’s brother, Morry Fraid, joined in 1976, establishing a partnership that would go on to create some of Australia’s most recognised retail brands. Brothers Morry Fraid and Ruben Fried, whose names were spelled differently due to a mistake by their teachers, immigrated to Australia from Israel in 1956 with their parents, who established a fabric stall at the Queen Victoria Market in Melbourne. The first Spotlight store was opened in 1973 in Malvern. By 1990 there were 30 stores across Australia and the company was turning over about A$90 million, with the brothers' net worth estimated by the Australian Financial Review as about A$30 million.

Beginning in the late 1990s, Spotlight used economic value added as an internal metric to calculate employee bonuses. By 2006, Spotlight was employing 6,000 people and had a turnover of A$600 million. It used the Howard government's WorkChoices legislation to entice its employees to accept Australian workplace agreements with lower wage rates.

In 2017, Spotlight was reportedly Australia's fifth-largest privately owned retailer, behind 7-Eleven, the Peregrine Corporation, Cotton On Group, and Peter Warren Automotive.

=== Expansion ===
Outside of Australia, Spotlight has stores in Singapore (1995), New Zealand (1996), and Malaysia (2014).

In March 2018, Spotlight Group announced that it had acquired outdoor retailer Mountain Designs for an undisclosed sum.

In March 2020, Spotlight Group was awarded the exclusive right to bid for Harris Scarfe, a chain of department stores placed into voluntary administration in 2019. The sale proceeded for a reported $70 million. In March 2021, Zac Fried announced that Spotlight Group planned to open 50 new Harris Scarfe stores in order to compete against Big W and Kmart.

=== Net worth ===
In 2021, The Australian listed Morry Fraid and Zac Fried, a son of Reuben Fried, as the 30th and 31st richest people in Australia, with a net worth of A$2.81 billion each. Meanwhile and in a contrasting assessment one month later, Morry Fraid, Zac Fried and family were listed on the Financial Review 2021 Rich List with a collective/joint net worth of A$3.19 billion. As of May 2025, their net worth was assessed at A$5.01 billion in the Financial Review 2025 Rich List.

Year	Financial Review Rich List		Forbes Australia's 50 richest	
Year	Rank	Net worth A$	Rank	Net worth US$
2021		$3.19 billion ▼		
2022	33 ▼	$3.20 billion ▲		
2023	26 ▲	$3.95 billion ▲		
2024	25 ▲	$4.62 billion ▲		
2025	29 ▼	$5.01 billion ▲		

Legend
Icon	Description
Steady	Has not changed from the previous year
▲	Has increased from the previous year
▼	Has decreased from the previous year

== Structure ==
As of 2021 Spotlight Group Holdings is divided into the Spotlight Property Group, managing the group's property portfolio; the Alara Investment Group, managing other investments; and the Spotlight Retail Group, which is divided into the brands of Spotlight, Anaconda, Mountain Designs, and Harris Scarfe.
