= Crowdrise =

CrowdRise
- Company type: Private
- Industry: Online fundraising
- Founded: May 19, 2010; 16 years ago
- Headquarters: Detroit, Michigan, U.S.
- Key people: Edward Norton, Shauna Robertson, Robert Wolfe, Jeffrey Wolfe
- Website: crowdrise.com

CrowdRise is a for-profit crowdfunding platform that raises charitable donations. CrowdRise was founded by Edward Norton, Shauna Robertson, and the founders of Moosejaw, Robert and Jeffrey Wolfe. CrowdRise was acquired in 2017 by GoFundMe.

== Overview ==
CrowdRise's fundraising model is based upon the notion of making giving back fun, which may lead to more people donating and more funds being raised. The platform uses gamification and a rewards point system to engage users to participate in fundraising and donating.

Its primary model is donation-based, and the campaign defaults to "keep what you raise".

Their default "Starter" pricing is to charge the non-profit a 5% platform fee from each donation, plus a payment processing fee (credit card fee) of 2.9% + $0.30 per donation. Donors may choose whether to pay the fee in addition to the amount of their donation or to have the fee subtracted from their donation amount before being delivered.

== See also ==
- Angel investor
- Civic crowdfunding
- Comparison of crowd funding services
- Crowdfunding
- List of most successful crowdfunding projects
- Microcredit
- Microfinance
- Threshold pledge system
- Virtual volunteering
