= Amart Sports =

Australian sporting goods retailer chain

- Amart Sports logo (2012–2017)
- Formerly: Amart All Sports (1976–2012)
- Industry: Retail
- Founded: 1976; 49 years ago Underwood, Queensland, Australia
- Defunct: 1 November 2017; 7 years ago
- Headquarters: Lidcombe, New South Wales, Australia
- Number of locations: 60 stores (2017)
- Products: Sporting goods
- Owner: Super Retail Group
- Website: www.rebelsport.com.au

Amart Sports (formerly Amart All Sports) was an Australian sports equipment and related apparel chain and was part of the Super Retail Group.

== History ==
=== Original ownership (1976-2004) ===
Amart All Sports was founded in 1976 with the first store located in Underwood, Queensland.

=== Archer Capital (2004-2011) ===
Archer Capital acquired Amart All Sports in 2004.

=== Super Retail Group (2011-2017) ===
Super Retail Group, who also operates Rebel, acquired the Amart All Sports business in November 2011.

== Operations ==
=== Defunct store formats ===
==== Amart All Sports ====
Amart All Sports expanded throughout Australia to over 60 stores, mainly in homemaker destination centres across Queensland, Victoria, South Australia, New South Wales and Western Australia.

==== Amart Sports ====
In 2012, the chain was rebranded as Amart Sports. On 24 July 2017, Super Retail Group made the announcement that all Amart Sports stores will be rebranded to Rebel stores by 31 October 2017, expanding the Rebel brand's national footprint to almost 160 stores in Australia. The Amart Sports brand was officially discontinued as of 1 November 2017.

== See also ==
- Amart Furniture
