= Rebel (company) =

Australian sporting goods chain owned by Super Retail Group

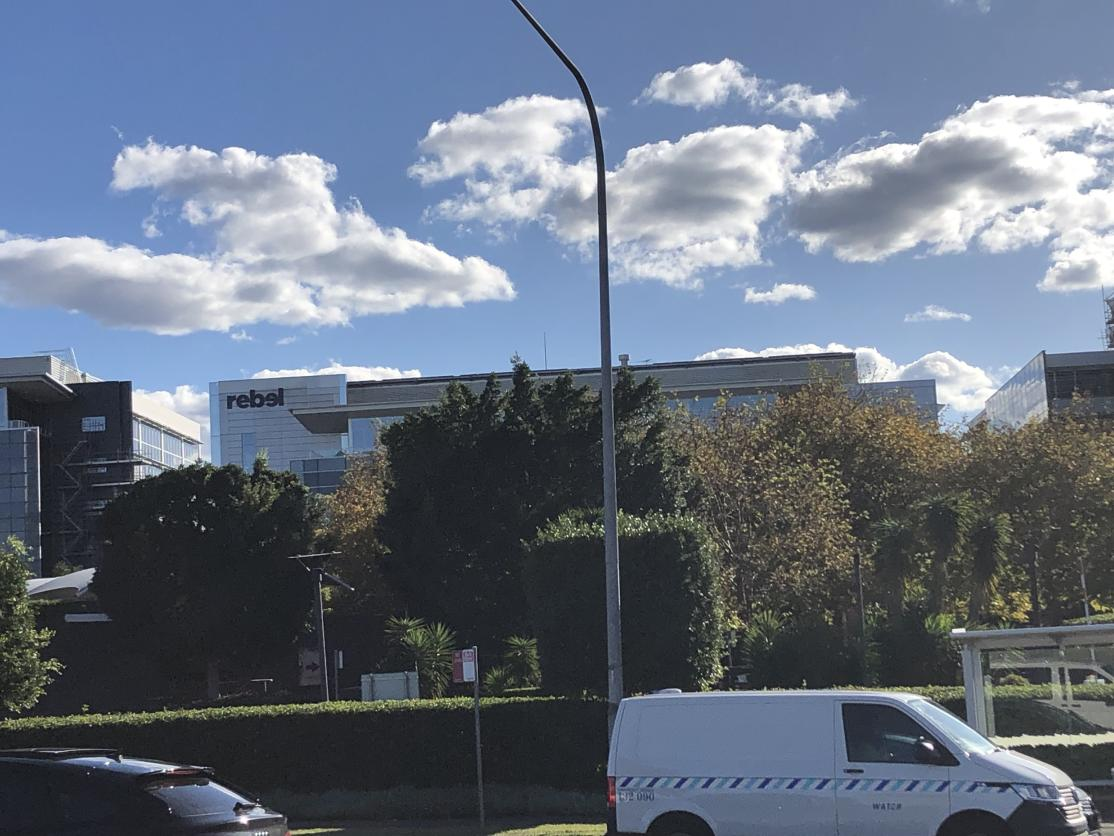
- Headquarters in Rhodes, New South Wales
- Industry: Retail
- Founded: 1985; 41 years ago
- Headquarters: Rhodes, New South Wales, Australia
- Number of locations: 159 stores (2024)
- Area served: Australia
- Key people: Gary Williams (Managing Director)
- Products: Sporting goods, leisure goods, sport apparel, footwear
- Number of employees: 6,000 (2024)
- Parent: Super Retail Group since 2011; 15 years ago
- Website: www.rebelsport.com.au

Rebel (formerly Rebel Sport), stylised as rebɘl, is an Australian sport equipment and related apparel chain. It is a subsidiary of Super Retail Group. The company has 159 stores across Australia and over 6,000 employees.

== History ==
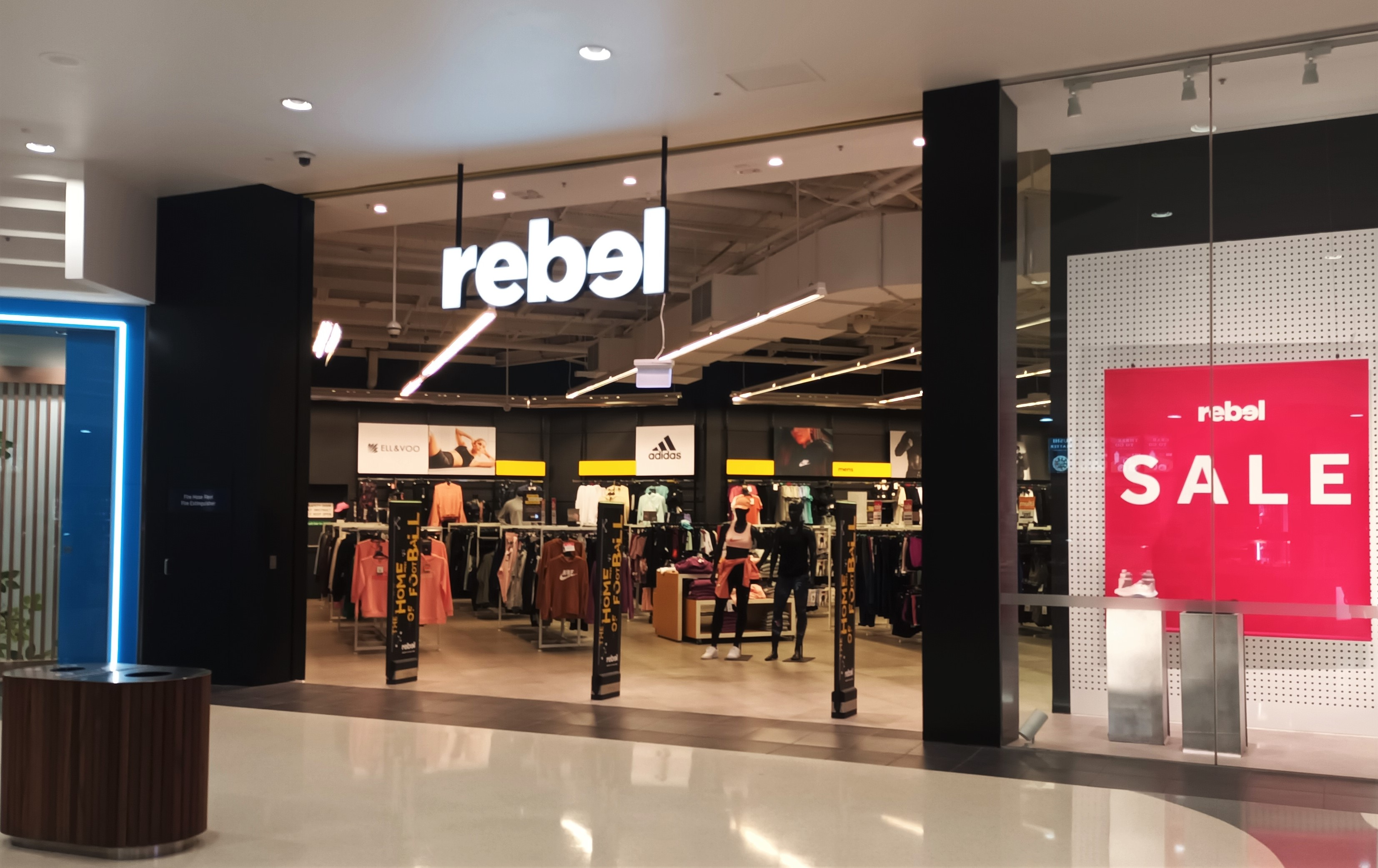
Rebel store in Stockland shopping centre, Rockhampton, Queensland, 2022

=== Original ownership (1985-2001) ===
Rebel Sport was established in 1985 with its first store in Bankstown.

It was listed on the Australian Securities Exchange in 1993.

=== Harvey Norman (2001-2007) ===
it was purchased by Harvey Norman in July 2001.

=== Archer Capital (2007-2011) ===
In 2007, Archer Capital acquired Rebel Sport and consolidated its sports retail businesses into it.

=== Super Retail Group (since 2011) ===
In 2011, Amart Sports was acquired by Super Retail Group.

== Operations ==
=== Current store formats ===
==== Rebel ====
Formerly Rebel Sport.

In 2012, Rebel Sport dropped the word "sport" from its name and adopted a new logo and black and yellow branding.

=== Defunct store formats ===
==== Amart Sports ====
Amart was a big format sports store headquartered in Queensland.

Archer Capital acquired Amart Sports in 2004.

In 2017, the Amart Sports brand was discontinued and merged into the Rebel Sport brand. The merger was designed to allow a focus on a single sporting goods brand and reduce costs.

==== Rowe & Jarman ====
Archer Capital also merged its acquisitions of South Australian-based Rowe & Jarman, smaller format stores doing business in Western Australia, South Australia, Northern Territory, Victoria and Tasmania to complement Amart Sports. Rowe & Jarman became known as Amart Sports.

== Brands ==
Rebel stocks a number of well known international brands, including Nike, Asics, Adidas, Puma and Under Armour.

Ell & Voo is an activewear brand owned by Rebel.

== Sponsorship ==
On 25 November 2015, Rebel signed on as Women's Big Bash League's naming rights sponsor and also become the official online retail store of Cricket Australia. Rebel sponsored the Rebel Sport Masters, a Tier 2 golf tournament on the Australasian PGA Tour held in January 2018 at Wainui Golf Club, Wainui, New Zealand.

== Controversy ==
Former CEO Anthony Heraghty lied about an affair he had with a subordinate. This cost the company 30 million.
