= Immersive commerce =

Online retail format

Immersive commerce is an extension of e-commerce that focuses on improving customer experience by using augmented reality, virtual reality and immersive technology to create virtual smart stores from existing brick and mortar locations.

Rather than an iteration of traditional e-commerce, immersive commerce is a form of online shopping that blends physical elements of traditional stores (i.e. rows, shelves, racks, counters, etc.) with digital elements of traditional e-commerce web sites (i.e. mobile commerce, electronic funds transfer, supply chain management, digital marketing, online transaction processing, electronic data interchange, inventory management systems, automated data collection systems and CRM). Immersive commerce platforms give consumers the ability to browse and shop aisles of a virtual store using any online device.
