= Super Retail Group =

Australian retail company

Super Retail Group Limited
- Type: Public
- Traded as: ASX: SUL
- Industry: Retail
- Founded: 1972; 54 years ago
- Founder: Reg Rowe
- Headquarters: Strathpine, Queensland, Australia
- Number of locations: 797 stores (2026)
- Key people: David Burns (Interim CEO)
- Revenue: A$2.71 billion (2018-19)
- Net income: A$139.3 million (2018-19)
- Number of employees: 16,000 (2024)
- Subsidiaries: BCF; Macpac; Rebel; Supercheap Auto
- Website: superretailgroup.com.au

Super Retail Group Limited is an Australian based company which owns and operates a portfolio of retail brands across Australia and New Zealand. The brands include automotive retailer Supercheap Auto, outdoor and leisure retailers Macpac and BCF and sporting retailer Rebel.

== History ==
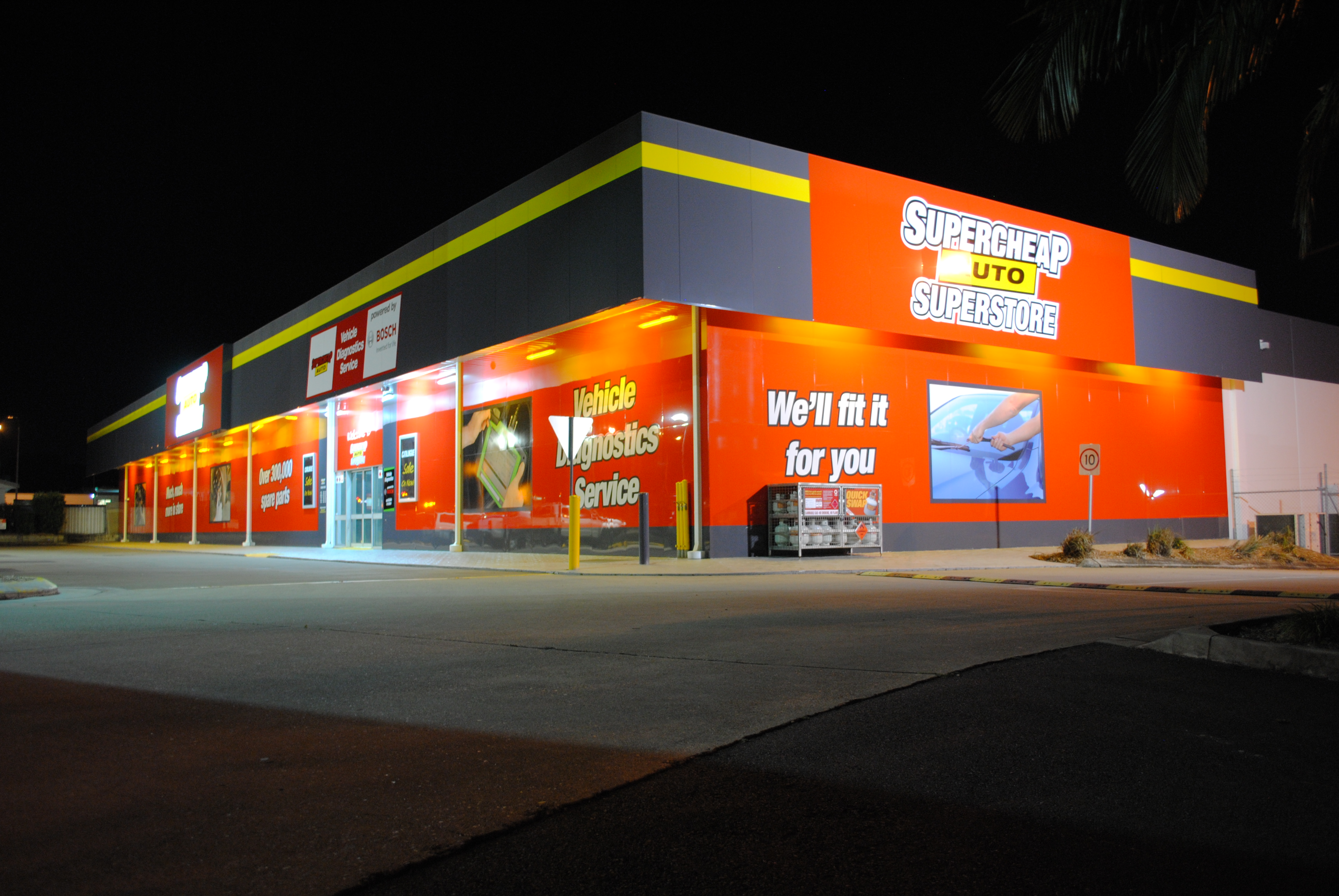
A Supercheap Auto retail store in Lawnton, Queensland

The company was founded in 1972 as a mail-order business selling automotive accessories from the Brisbane home of founders Reg and Hazel Rowe. The company opened several stores over the following decades, changing the name of the company to Super Cheap Auto in 1981 before returning to Super Retail Group in 2010.

In July 2004, the company was listed on the Australian Securities Exchange as Super Cheap Auto which earned the co-founders $81.8 million. In December 2004, Super Cheap Auto Group acquired CampMart, a camping and outdoor leisure retailer with four stores in Brisbane. It used the acquisition as the foundation to launch its BCF Boating Camping Fishing business in October 2005.

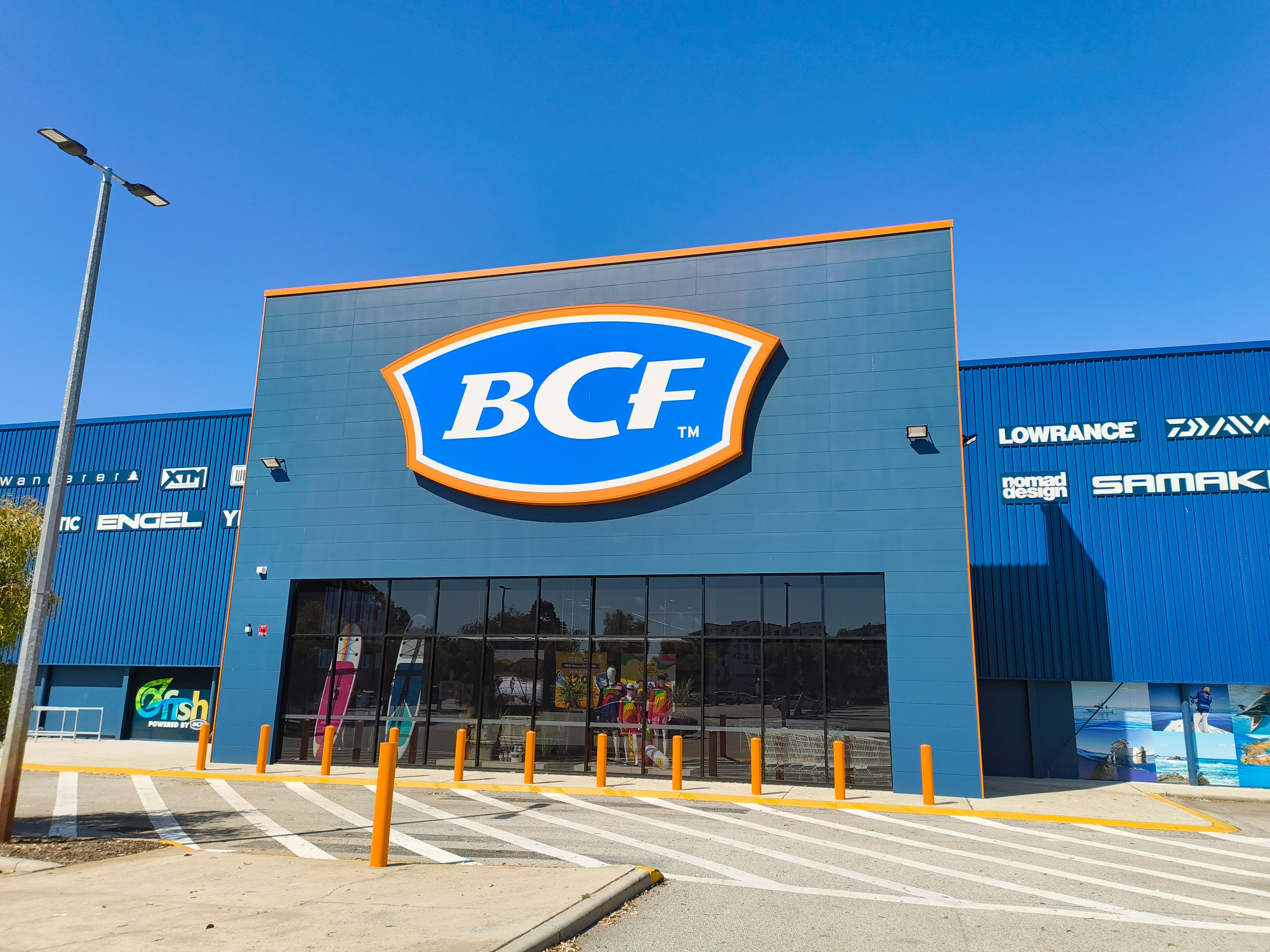
BCF store in Cannington, Western Australia

In 2010, the company acquired Rays, a camping and outdoor goods store. In 2011, the company acquired Rebel Sport and Amart Sports. In 2017, the Amart Sports brand was discontinued and merged into the Rebel Sport brand. The merger was designed to allow a focus on a single sporting goods brand and reduce costs. In April 2018, several Rays began to be liquidated, with the remainder stores planned to be merged with its recently acquired, New Zealand chain Macpac. In December 2019 the group moved into their new $75 million office building situated at 6 Coulthards Avenue, Strathpine.

Super Retail Group has also expanded into online sales.

== Operations ==
=== Current store formats ===
- Supercheap Auto
- BCF
- Rebel
- Macpac

=== Defunct store formats ===
- Amart Sports
- CampMart
- Rays
- Rebel Fit (formerly Workout World)
