= Harris Scarfe =

Australian discount department store chain owned by Spotlight Group

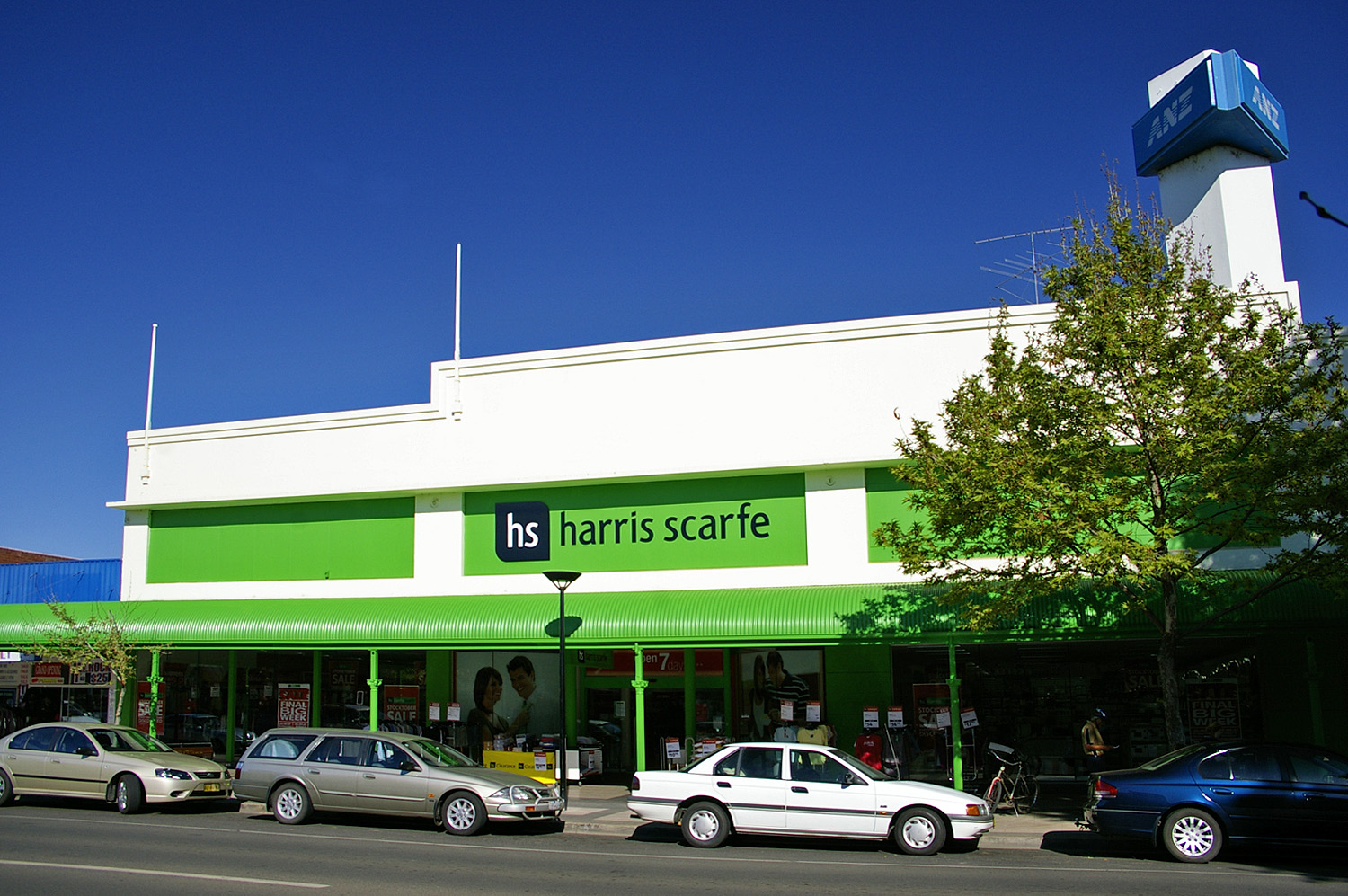
- Harris Scarfe store in Wagga Wagga
- Type: Private
- Industry: Retail
- Founded: 1849; 177 years ago
- Founders: George Peter Harris and George Scarfe
- Headquarters: Richmond, Victoria, Australia
- Number of locations: 60 stores (2025)
- Products: Bed linen, homewares, kitchenware, manchester, electrical goods, kitchen appliances, women's and men's apparel, intimates, footwear and luggage
- Number of employees: 1,200 (2020)
- Parent: Spotlight Group since April 2020; 6 years ago
- Website: harrisscarfe.com.au

Harris Scarfe is an Australian retailer that sells a wide range of homewares and apparel in Australia. The range includes bed linen, bedding, bathroom linen and accessories, kitchenware, home decor, homewares, tableware, electrical appliances, kitchen appliances plus clothing & apparel for men and women. It was founded in 1849 in Adelaide, South Australia and has more than 50 stores nationally.

In 2015, ownership of Harris Scarfe was transferred to Steinhoff Asia Pacific, an international retail and manufacturing conglomerate listed on the Frankfurt stock exchange. In December 2017, Steinhoff's was accused of overstating its profits and the share price dropped by 90% The company then entered a period of intense asset sell off, which resulted in Harris Scarfe being sold to Allegro Funds in December 2019. Shortly after, Allegro put Harris Scarfe and its related entities into administration. Spotlight Group then bought the business out of administration in April 2020.

== History ==
=== Early history ===
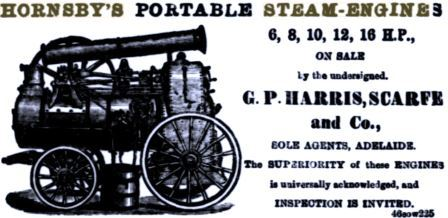
Harris, Scarfe advert October 1881

Harris Scarfe traces its history to 10 February 1849, when George Peter Harris and John C. Lanyon, arrived in Adelaide, South Australia on the ship Candahar and established a hardware and ironmongery business on Hindley Street. Lanyon left the partnership on 22 February 1855 and returned to London, where he opened a buying house for Geo. P. Harris and other businesses in South Australia. Additional partners, George Scarfe and Richard Smith, joined the business in 1866 and the business name "Geo. P. Harris, Scarfe & Co." was adopted in December that year. They had premises on the east side of Gawler Place, midway between Rundle and Grenfell streets, where Allan's building now stands (58-60 Gawler Place). A new four-storey building, on a 70 by 70 feet (21 m × 21 m) freehold property between Rundle and Grenfell streets, was erected behind their old (leased) property in 1929.

Harris Scarfe grew to become a major supplier of a broad range of household, agricultural and industrial items. Besides conducting its retailing businesses, Harris Scarfe manufactured leather goods, including saddlery and luggage, as part of a wholesaling operation. Notably, during World War II, when the federal government enforced price controls, it used the Harris Scarfe catalogue as the price guide.

=== Rainbow Cycles ===
Rainbow bicycles, mostly made in South Australia by Harris Scarfe, were sold in their stores in both South Australia and, through a partnership with Sandovers, in Western Australia. They were first marketed in Western Australian stores in 1934. In 1936 sponsored rider Billy Read crossed Australia on a Rainbow, and in the 1940s and 1950s Sandovers were an enthusiastic sponsor of local road and track cyclists. Most of the bikes were low priced utility models, however sponsored riders in Perth were sent to Aussie Cycles by the Rainbow coach Ossie Prowse, where they would be measured for custom built Aussie bikes finished with Rainbow branding.

=== 1970s–1980s ===
In 1971, Baradeen Quest, a subsidiary of Investment & Merchant Finance Corporation (IMFC) made a successful takeover bid for Harris Scarfe, which was listed on the Australian Securities Exchange at the time.

Charles Davis, a listed Tasmanian company controlled by Donald Trescowthick, acquired control of Harris Scarfe in 1976. Trescowthick focused Harris Scarfe's activities on its retailing business, developing a full line department store model, while the industrial products outlet at Mile End evolved to become Harris Scarfe Industrial (trading as Harrys Hardware), a large hardware retailing business. There were multiple small adjacent shops such as paint, power tools, garden.

The success of Harry's led Harris Scarfe's parent company, Charles Davis Limited, to acquire other hardware retailers, including Lloyd's in South Australia, Campbell's in Queensland, and McEwans in Victoria and New South Wales. In 1989, these hardware businesses were sold in a management buyout, and acquired by Bunnings in 1993.

=== 1990s ===
In the 1990s, Harris Scarfe entered an era of unprecedented national growth. It expanded beyond its large department store in Rundle Mall into smaller format suburban and regional shopping stores. Harris Scarfe also acquired full-line department store sites from other retailers who were rationalising their store networks including David Jones (Cairns, Townsville and Macarthur Square NSW), Myer (Colonnades), John Martin's (Arndale and Elizabeth), Stirlings in Western Australia (Albany, Bunbury and Geraldton), FitzGerald's in Tasmania and Melbourne (Hobart, Moonah, Eastlands, New Norfolk, Launceston, Ulverstone, Devonport, Burnie and Forest Hill) and Centre Fair (Shepparton). By 1995, Harris Scarfe had become Australia's third largest department store retailer, with 38 stores, and trading in all states of Australia.

The company ran into trouble during the late 1990s due to rising debts and management issues. In April 2001, the business was placed in receivership. Unsecured creditors were owed $93 million, and the company was $50 million in debt. In June 2002, the company's former chief financial officer, Alan Hodgson, was sentenced to six years in jail, on multiple counts that included giving false information to the Australian Securities Exchange, (ASX) and failing to act honestly as a company officer.

=== 2000s ===
In 2001, Harris Scarfe listed on the ASX. In the same year, the company fell $160 million into debt, resulting in the owners, the Trescowthick family, losing $31.5 million. The government initially considered pressing charges against chairman Adam Trescowthick, but later dropped the case.

In 2002, the company started a revitalization program. The store network was remodelled with new products, layouts and new branding. As a result, Harris Scarfe soon began to enjoy record growth. By 2007, Sydney-based Momentum Private Equity acquired an $80 million majority stake in the company.

Over a six-month period at the end of 2003, Harris Scarfe made certain representations on a number of items in its catalogues in relation to pricing. Harris Scarfe admitted to the Australian Competition & Consumer Commission (ACCC) that representations in its promotional advertising may have misled consumers.

Again in 2007 Harris Scarfe was investigated by the Australian consumer watchdog who sued the department store in the Australian Federal Court over allegedly false promotions for its sales in October 2006. The ACCC alleged that the advertising was misleading because Harris Scarfe was not offering what it advertised:

1. A discount off all goods in its stores.
2. A minimum of 20% off all goods in its stores.

The ACCC also alleged that the catalogue included images of products under banners stating a specific discount when some of those goods were not discounted by the stated percentage.

In 2009, the Federal Court, Adelaide has declared that Harris Scarfe Australia Pty Ltd misled consumers by representing in a catalogue that certain advertised items were discounted by a specific amount when in fact they were discounted by less than that amount, or were not discounted at all.

Harris Scarfe CEO, Robert Atkins, was sacked for gross misconduct from the top post at Harris Scarfe in March 2009 after eight years at the helm of the department store. He played a significant role in the restructuring of retail trading hours in South Australia and in the revitalization of the state's premium retail precinct as chairman of the Rundle Mall Management Authority. Robert Atkins died in January 2010.

After Robert Atkins' dismissal from Harris Scarfe, Joe Barberis was named managing director of the retailer in February 2009 until September 2014. Graham Dean, previously Myer group general manager of Electrical, was named CEO of Harris Scarfe.

=== 2010s ===
In 2012, Momentum Capital sold the business to Pepkor, a South African private equity firm. That year, Kyly Clarke also became the face of Harris Scarfe's fashion home brand 'Boutique@hs'.

In 2014, Steinhoff Asia Pacific (later renamed Greenlit Brands) acquired Pepkor and this included Harris Scarfe.

In January 2014, General Manager of Harris Scarfe Daniel Nikoleaff was demoted to Area Manager of South Australia. Nikoleaff was replaced by Rebecca Peterson previously CEO of the Lovisa jewellery stores.

In October 2013, Harris Scarfe officially launched Simply Vera, by Vera Wang which is designed by Vera Wang who is based in New York City. The collection comprises a range of contemporary women's fashion, accessories, bed and bath collections and home fragrances.

Harris Scarfe's home brand 'Bulls Head' jeans were found to have azo dyes classed as carcinogens in the pocket linings. The jeans were recalled in July 2015.

In 2017, Harris Scarfe also collaborated with Shaynna Blaze, an interior designer from The Block on bed linens, homewares, accessories and apparel.

In October 2017, just before the Steinhoff corruption scandal unfolded, Steinhoff International appointed former The Good Guys boss Michael Ford, to oversee its Australasian operation. He had left behind a retailer that had to be significantly restructured due to cash flow problems and a lack of stock in the business.

British fashion brand Debenhams granted exclusivity to Harris Scarfe for their launch in Australia in February 2017. The arrangement was short lived and Harris Scarfe parted ways with Debenhams in November 2019. Harris Scarfe's relationship with Debenhams "played a key role in the insolvency of Harris Scarfe which would fall into administration in December 2020."

During April 2018, they launched a new collection with Jamie Durie, TV personality The Outdoor Room named Jamie Durie by Ardor which is a casual bed linen product range.

Channel Seven Morning Show presenter Kylie Gillies was named Harris Scarfe's fashion ambassador in August 2018.

In December 2019, parent company Greenlit Brands sold both Harris Scarfe and Best & Less to Australian private equity firm Allegro Funds.

On 11 December 2019, Harris Scarfe under General Manager Rebecca Peterson, entered voluntary administration, forcing it back into receivership with Deloitte Restructuring Services partners taking over management of the business. The retailer reported $380 million in annual sales earlier in the year. At the time, Harris Scarfe had 66 stores employing 1800 staff. In response, the Shop, Distributive and Allied Employees Association labour union said that they would be filing a complaint with the Fair Work Commission because they were not informed in advance. Deloitte claims Harris Scarfe has "more than sufficient" assets to pay all staff entitlements.

=== 2020s ===
In January 2020, Harris Scarfe announced it would close 21 of its 65 stores, resulting in the loss of 440 jobs. 1380 staff would remain in the 44 stores still in operation. The closures consist of one in South Australia (flagship) and in the Australian Capital Territory, two in Western Australia, three in Victoria, six in Queensland, and eight in New South Wales. As of 2 February 2020, 20 stores have closed, with the store in Earlville, Cairns, being spared from closure, leaving 45 stores, being three in Australian Capital Territory, three in Queensland, five in Tasmania, five in New South Wales, eight in South Australia and 21 in Victoria.

During this time Harris Scarfe's credit card services and interest free offers were no longer honored or available.

On 3 March 2020, it was announced that Spotlight Group will purchase the remaining stores.

On 31 March 2020 Harris Scarfe laid off a further 59 staff, announced the day after Australian Prime Minister Scott Morrison announced the national JobKeeper Scheme. Deloitte, which acted as Harris Scarfe's receiver, expects the sale to be finalised just after Easter. Staff were initially told the redundancies were being made due to the current economic conditions and COVID-19 crisis. This was later backtracked to claim the redundancies were part of the sale process. And that, while Harris Scarfe will be applying for the Government's JobKeeper initiative to support remaining staff, those let go on 'restructuring' grounds may not be supported under the payment scheme. Harris Scarfe HR Lauren Barry told media that she was "happy to send redundant workers to Centrelink with a letter provided" by the collapsing company

On 3 April 2020, Smart Company reported Harris Scarfe was being investigated by the retail union for possibly breaching the Fair Work Act and treating their staff unfairly.

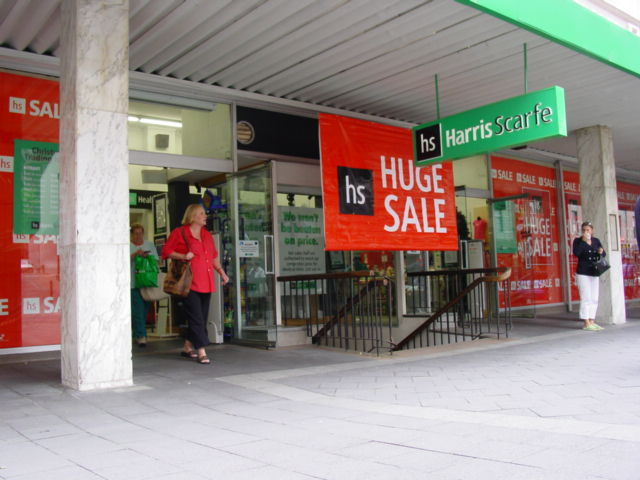
A Harris Scarfe store on Collins Street in the Hobart central business district, formerly FitzGerald's, pictured in 2005. This store closed in 2020.

The Mercury newspaper in Tasmania reported on 7 April 2020, Harris Scarfe's newly renovated Hobart store would be closing.

The Australian Financial Review reported on 8 April 2020 that Harris Scarfe was still in the red despite the Spotlight deal. On 9 April 2020 Channel News added "Several appliance and CE distributors are set to only get between 1.3¢ and 20.5¢ in the dollar under a proposed deed of company arrangement for the failed Harris Scarfe, Allegro the Company who owned the stores for only three weeks will get $70M...The Australian Financial Review reported that the receivers blamed Harris Scarfe’s collapse on loss-making stores, most of which opened between 2014 and 2019, and the retailer’s inability to access funding after the sale to Allegro, which is the first ranking secured creditor and will receive a return of almost $70 million."

On 24 April 2020, The Herald Sun reported Harris Scarfe became insolvent the moment private equity firm Allegro Funds took control of the struggling department store chain. Days later Channel News had spoken to unhappy suppliers who were allegedly ripped off and believe the company's collapse was an orchestrated con. Channel News in a follow-up reported Harris Scarfe had illegally traded insolvent during December 2019.

Commercial Real Estate reported on 28 April 2020 that Harris Scarfe's new owner Spotlight refused to pay its monthly rent for all stores. They were unwilling to work with landlords, demanding a 50% reduction on all rent. Spotlight also had yet to pay $50 million for the newly acquired Harris Scarfe. Former Queensland Premier Campbell Newman described Spotlight's actions as: "unconscionable conduct ... Many landlords have received 'take it or leave it' letters proposing significant rent concessions or outright rent waivers. Landlords are reporting that they have been threatened and pressured to accept ... At the same time, many of these companies have actually seen improved sales turnover." Mr Newman said.

As of April 2020, approximately 1200 staff remain.

In July 2020, The Fair Work Commission ruled the Shop, Distributive and Allied Employees Association (SDA Union) knowingly acted against the best interests of former Harris Scarfe employees when it decided to hold off filing unfair dismissal claims on their behalf within the required 21 days. Without informing the employees, the SDA's national executive opted against filing their claims after being told by the Harris Scarfe administrator the legal challenges would jeopardize a looming sale of the fallen department store chain, which continued to employ 1200 workers.

The Retail and Fast Food Workers Union said: "It will come as no surprise that the SDA sold out unfairly sacked Harris Scarfe workers to keep in favour with the boss and keep those payroll deductions flowing. Today the Fair Work Commission found: "Rather than take any step to deal with the obvious conflict of interest, Mr Griffin did nothing, and worse still, did not inform the Applicant that the SDA had made a deliberate decision, contrary to her interests, not to lodge the application within the 21 day period."

Smart Company reported on 31 July that Harris Scarfe had been hiring new staff shortly after Harris Scarfe made redundancies in March. "On May 5, five weeks to the day after the redundancies, Harris Scarfe’s area manager (Daniel Nikoleaff) for South Australia and Tasmania instructed store managers via email to refrain from hiring new staff in stores where team members had been made redundant. They were told the general manager of operations (Rebecca Peterson) would advise when hiring in these stores would resume, and it wasn’t long before that began happening." Harris Scarfe refused to comment on the redundancies and still cannot provide a reason for the redundancies, although the SDA insinuates it was a condition of sale to Spotlight.

In February 2021 Harris Scarfe's creditors learned that their dividend of between 1.3 cents and 20.5 cents in the dollar they were scheduled to receive in July 2020 had been delayed for a second time. The Australian Financial Review was told by suppliers that they were asked to increase the amount of stock deliveries in the weeks leading up to Harris Scarfe's collapse. Several of Harris Scarfe's suppliers are owed in excess of $1million.

Despite having a record year in sales since Spotlight acquired Harris Scarfe, in February 2021 the Australian Financial Review reported Harris Scarfe still owed their suppliers up to $236 million. It was also reported that Spotlight had been charging suppliers a 10 per cent fee on late orders amid the global crisis.

== Store formats ==
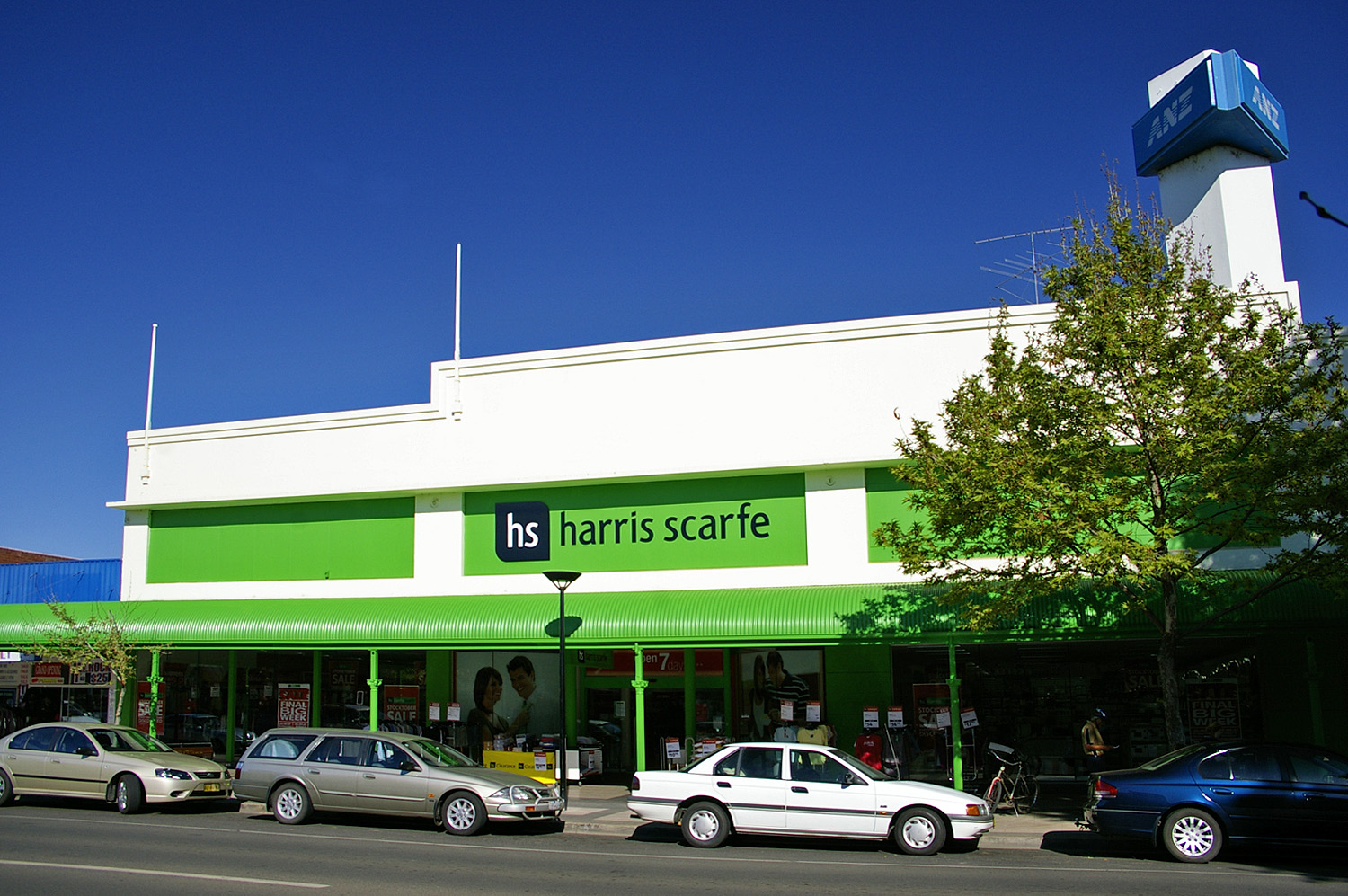
A Harris Scarfe store in Wagga Wagga, pictured in 2008

Harris Scarfe lifestyle and homewares stores sell a full range of bed linen, homewares, cookware, manchester, apparel, electrical appliances, kitchen appliances, menswear, womenswear, intimates, sportswear, travel and outdoor. Harris Scarfe stores are located across Australian Capital Territory, New South Wales, Queensland, South Australia, Tasmania and Victoria. There are currently 52 Harris Scarfe stores. The retailer has also entered Western Australia three times, but has pulled out.

Harris Scarfe Home stores sell homewares including bed linen, homewares, cookware, kitchen appliances, electrical goods, personal care and bathroom electrical. Harris Scarfe Home stores are located across New South Wales, Queensland, South Australia, Tasmania and Victoria. There are currently 11 Harris Scarfe Home stores. In 2025 Harris Scarfe opened a store in Bunbury WA.

== Product categories ==
Harris Scarfe stores sell the following products:

- Bed Linen & Manchester - bed sheets, quilts, quilt covers, pillows, pillow cases, bed throws, comforters, mattress toppers, mattress protectors, pillow protectors, electric blankets & heated throws
- Bathroom Towels & Accessories - bath towels, bath sheets, bath mats, hand towels, face washers, bath robes, bathroom scales, bathroom storage & accessories
- Home Decor - cushions, throws, clocks, vases, candles, diffusers, lamps, photo frames and wall art
- Kitchenware and Cookware - cook sets, fry pans, cast iron cookware, stainless steel cookware, induction cookware, bakeware, kitchen knives and cooking utensils
- Tableware - dinnerware & dinner sets, cutlery sets, glassware, table linen, bar tools, serving platters and serving bowls
- Kitchen Appliances - air fryers, slow cookers, coffee machines, grills, kettles, toasters, food processors, blenders, microwave ovens, pressure cookers, rice cookers and juicers
- Home Electrical Appliances - vacuum cleaners, robot vacuums, steam mops, irons, garment steamers, heaters and fans
- Personal Care & Bathroom Electrical Appliances - hairdryers, hair straighteners, hair curlers, electric shavers, electric massagers
- Women's Clothing & Apparel - womenswear, underwear, bras, footwear and nightwear
- Men's Clothing & Apparel - menswear, underwear, footwear and nightwear
- Travel Goods - luggage and travel accessories

=== Exclusive brands ===
- Smith + Nobel — Harris Scarfe's budget "home" brand.
- Miguel Maestre - celebrity style within Smith + Nobel
- Jayson Brunsdon - apparel, manchester and homewares
- Jane Lamerton - apparel, manchester and homewares
- Chyka - apparel, manchester and homewares
- Shayna Blaze — homewares collection from Australian designer Shaynna Blaze.
- MOZI — Australian-designed homewares.

== See also ==
- Department stores around the world
