= Moosejaw =

Online and brick and mortar retailer specializing in outdoor recreation apparel

Moosejaw.com
- Company type: Subsidiary
- Industry: Retail
- Founded: 1992; 34 years ago
- Founders: Robert Wolfe; David Jaffe
- Defunct: 2024; 2 years ago
- Fate: acquired by Dick's Sporting Goods and merged with Public Lands
- Headquarters: Madison Heights, Michigan, U.S.
- Number of locations: 0
- Key people: Eoin Comerford (CEO)
- Products: Outdoor gear
- Number of employees: About 350 (2017)
- Parent: Dick's Sporting Goods (2023–present)
- Website: moosejaw.com

Moosejaw.com is a defunct online and brick and mortar retailer of outdoor recreation apparel and gear for snowboarding, rock climbing, hiking, and camping. The company was founded in 1992 by Robert Wolfe and David Jaffe, two long-time friends who chose to sell camping equipment instead of becoming wilderness guides.

In August 2024, the remaining three stores announced their closure and the Moosejaw website was shut down. Moosejaw.com now redirects to Publiclands.com, another subsidiary of Dick's Sporting Goods launched in 2021.

== History ==
Moosejaw.com was named a Top 50 retailer by Internet Retailer (2007), Top 50 retailer by Bizrate (2006), Best of the Web by Forbes magazine, and a Top 500 Retailer by Internet Retailer.

Moosejaw was known for its non-sensical marketing, called "Moosejaw Madness".

In 2021, the store had twelve physical locations, including eight in Michigan, one in Arkansas, one in Illinois, one in Colorado, one in Missouri, and one in Kansas.

According to its website, the first store opened in 1992 in Keego Harbor, Michigan. Moosejaw's official name, as it appears on their corporate charter, is Moosejaw Mountaineering and Backcountry Travel, Inc. In November 2011, Moosejaw released an augmented reality app designed by Marxent Labs which allows shoppers to hold their mobile device over the Moosejaw catalog and view images of the models in their underwear. On September 1, 2012, Moosejaw Mountaineering opened a store in Kansas City, Missouri, located in Country Club Plaza, an upscale retail/dining district south of downtown Kansas City. Moosejaw's annual revenue neared $100 million in 2014 and was growing roughly 25% per year at that time. Another new store opened in 2020 in Olathe, Kansas, and was associated with local rock climbing gym ROKC. In 2021, Moosejaw opened a store in Bentonville, Arkansas. As of 2023, only three stores remain; one in Birmingham, one in Salt Lake City, and one in Bentonville, Arkansas.

In 2007, Parallel Investment Partners, a private equity firm based in Dallas, acquired a majority stake in Moosejaw on undisclosed terms. Private equity firms Glencoe Capital and W Capital Partners acquired stakes in Moosejaw in 2009 and 2013, respectively, both on undisclosed terms.

On February 15, 2017, Walmart acquired Moosejaw for $51 million as part of a strategy to enhance its e-commerce presence. In February 2023, Dick's Sporting Goods agreed to buy Moosejaw from Walmart for an undisclosed amount, aiming to integrate Moosejaw's operations with its own outdoor-focused subsidiary.

In September 2023, Dick's announced that it would be closing down all but three Moosejaw stores, along with the headquarters in Madison Heights, Michigan. All operations were moved to Pittsburgh effective February 2024. In August 2024, all remaining stores were closed and the Moosejaw website was shut down.

== See also ==
- Crowdrise
