= Mountain Designs =

Australian outdoor clothing and equipment company

- Type: Subsidiary
- Industry: Retail
- Founded: 1975; 51 years ago in Brisbane, Australia
- Founder: Rick White
- Number of locations: 45 stores (2018)
- Products: Outdoor clothing and equipment
- Parent: Spotlight Retail Group

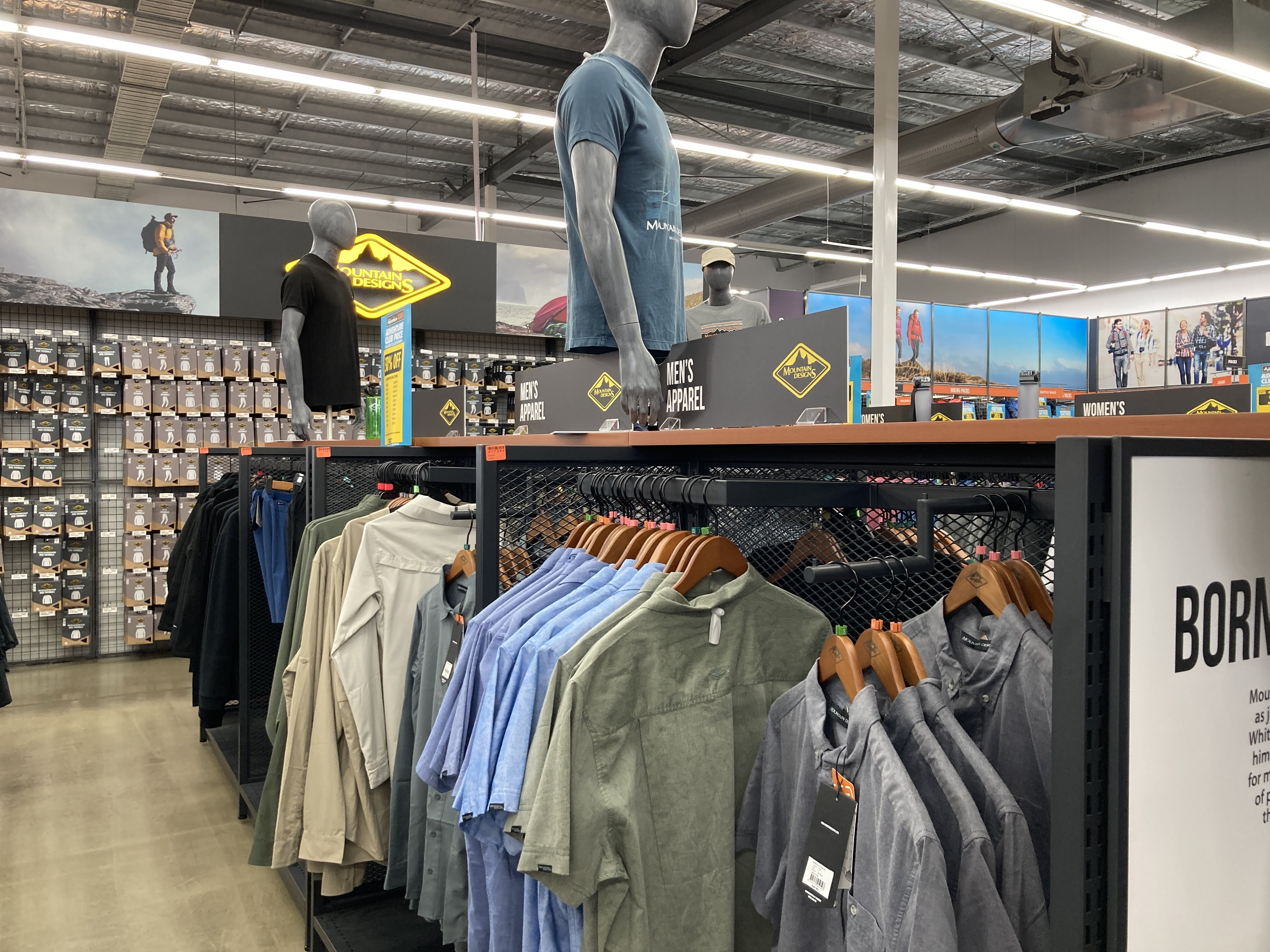
Mountain Designs brand clothing in an Anaconda store in Canberra

Mountain Designs is an outdoor clothing and equipment business based in Australia. They sell hiking, rockclimbing and general outdoor and recreational equipment. The company stocks a variety of international and local brands, as well as their own brands of clothing, accessories, sleepwear and bags.

== History ==
The business was founded by Rick White in Brisbane in 1975.

By 2004, Mountain Designs was operating a factory, head office and factory outlet in Brisbane. It had 29 regular stores: three in Queensland, seven in New South Wales, six in Victoria, seven in Western Australia, one in South Australia, one in the Australian Capital Territory, and four in New Zealand. At this stage, the chain was still yet to open in Auckland.

Mountain Designs pulled out of the New Zealand market in 2014, citing a slow economy and a saturated market. At the time of the announcement, it had 12 stores around the country, including three in Auckland.

In January 2018, the chain closed all its stores and transitioned to online-only retailing; it had 45 stores across Australia by this time. In March of that year, the Spotlight Retail Group purchased the company for an undisclosed sum.

In April 2019, Mountain Designs relaunched its e-commerce website. It also began to sell a selection of its range through about 60 of Spotlight's Anaconda outdoor stores.
