= Macpac =

Australian outdoor recreation goods chain owned by Super Retail Group

- Type: Subsidiary
- Industry: Retail
- Founded: 1973; 53 years ago, in Christchurch, New Zealand
- Founder: Bruce McIntyre
- Headquarters: Christchurch, New Zealand
- Number of locations: 97 stores (2024)
- Products: Outdoor clothing, mountaineering backpacks, and camping equipment
- Parent: Super Retail Group since 2018; 8 years ago
- Website: macpac.co.nz macpac.com.au

Macpac is a New Zealand based brand specialising in outdoor recreational equipment. It is best known for camping and travel equipment including backpacks, sleeping bags and technical clothing. Macpac was originally a New Zealand company but is now owned by the Australian company Super Retail Group. Macpac was founded by Bruce McIntyre in 1973.

As of 2016, Macpac had two e-commerce stores, 27 New Zealand and 17 Australian retail stores. Macpac's international distribution is through third party companies in Europe, United Kingdom, Japan and Chile.

== History ==
An early Macpac Wilderness Equipment logo on a raincoat

Macpac's roots can be traced to New Zealander Bruce McIntyre, who began designing his own outdoor gear after he left university aged 19 in 1973 and started making his first packs in his parents' garage in Christchurch. In 1975, he was involved with developing gear for a group of young men from the Canterbury Mountaineering Club who were heading to the South American Andes. The result was New Zealand’s first internal frame climbing pack – the Torre Egger.

McIntyre extended the Torre Egger concept to suit trampers and travellers as well. He focused on customer service and product quality. By 1978, sales were growing at 100% a year and Macpac was unable to keep up with demand. Nevertheless, McIntyre headed to Australia to develop the company’s first export market. In 1987, he began exporting to the Netherlands and Switzerland, soon followed by Germany and the UK.

In 2003, Macpac moved the majority of its production to Asia, shedding 150 jobs in Christchurch. McIntyre, the managing director at this time, blamed a 40% rise in the New Zealand dollar and a slow-down in international travel.

In 2007, Macpac under the Mouton Noir parent company assimilated the down apparel and equipment retailer Fairydown.

In January 2016, 90% of the company was bought by an Australian company Champ Ventures for about A$70m (NZ$74m) from Mouton Noir, owner of Fairydown outdoor equipment and clothing brand, and Kathmandu founder Jan Cameron. Macpac products are no longer available through third party retailers in New Zealand and Australia, and instead are now sold directly in Macpac branded stores, however the brand is sold overseas in third party stores.

In September 2016, Macpac signed a deal with Amazon to enter the United States market.

In February 2018, it was announced that the Australian Super Retail Group purchased Macpac for A$135 million. They announced that they would rebrand their Ray's Outdoors stores in Australia to Macpac.

== Equipment ==
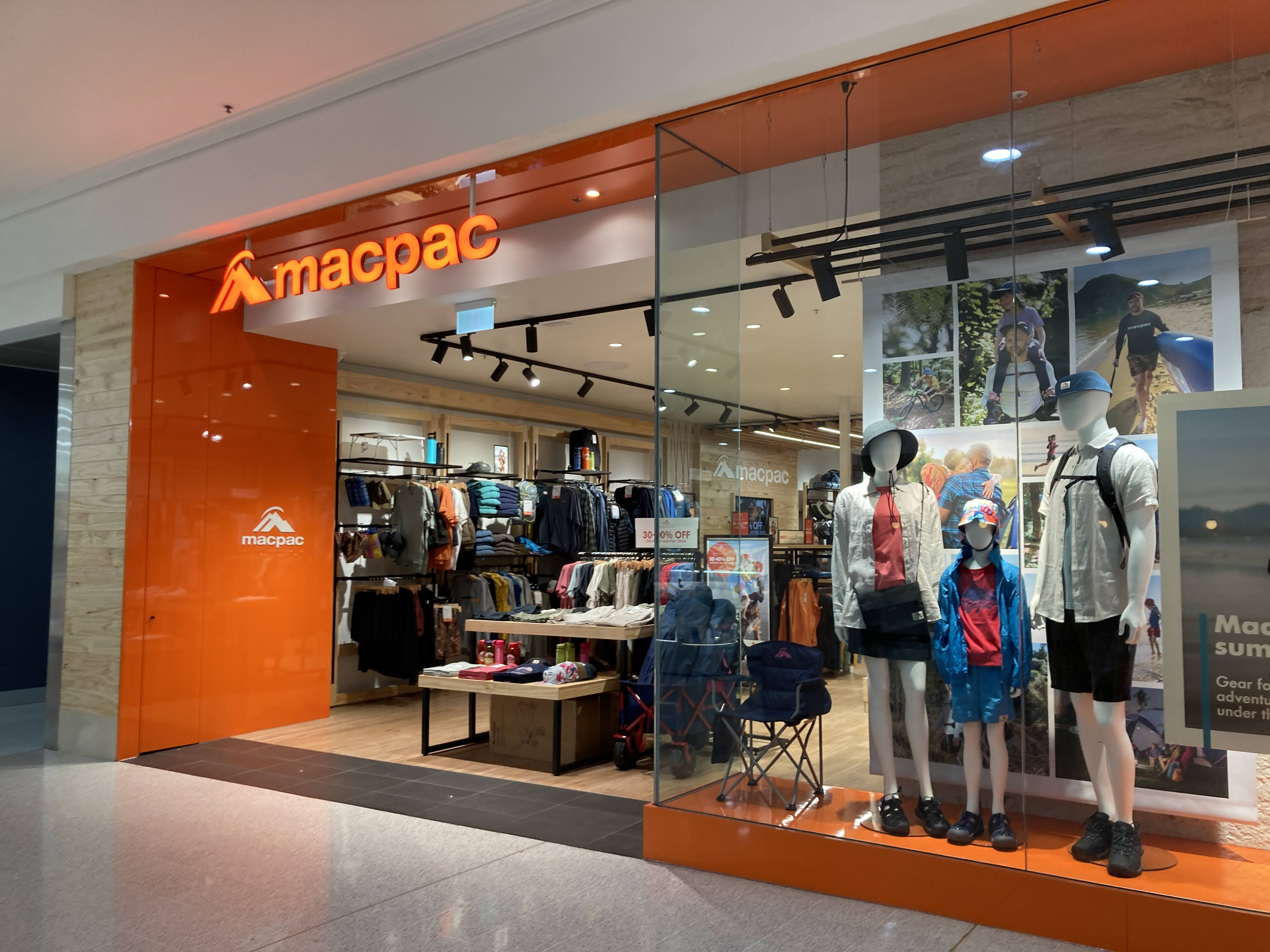
A Macpac store in Canberra during 2023

Macpac designs and manufactures a range of outdoor equipment, ranging from technical garments, backpacks, sleeping bags and multiple tents designed to serve in different environments.

Macpac has been a major sponsor of the New Zealand Alpine Team since 2013, and has a range of alpine-specific clothing and packs

== See also ==
- List of mountaineering equipment brands
- List of outdoor industry parent companies
