= BCF (retailer) =

Australian outdoor recreation goods chain owned by Super Retail Group

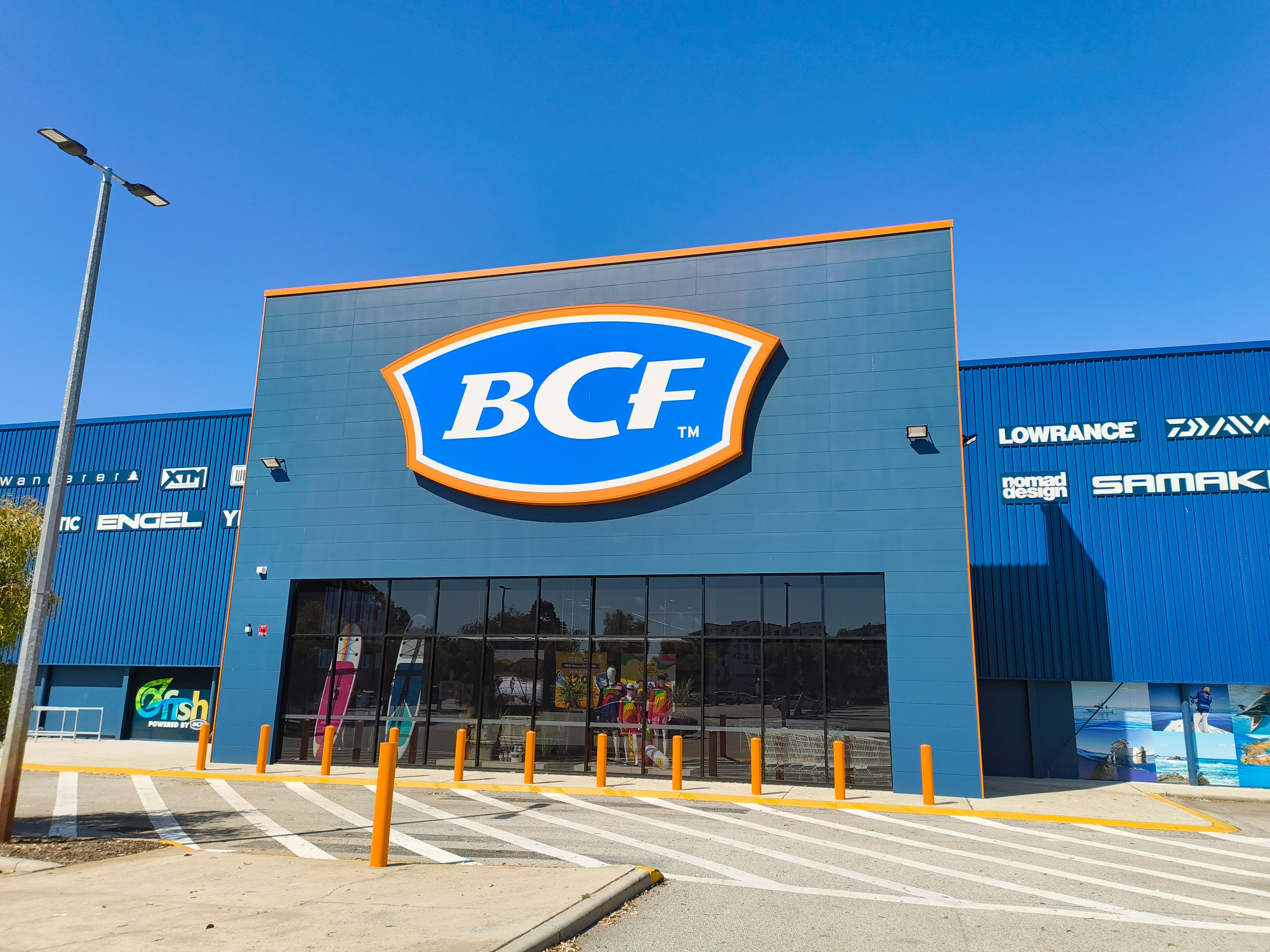
- BCF store in Cannington, Western Australia
- Type: Subsidiary
- Industry: Retail
- Founded: October 2005; 21 years ago in Brisbane, Australia
- Headquarters: Strathpine, Queensland, Australia
- Number of locations: 170 stores (2026)
- Products: Outdoor goods
- Parent: Super Retail Group
- Website: bcf.com.au

BCF or Boating Camping and Fishing is an Australian chain of retail stores selling a wide range of outdoor clothing and equipment. It is a subsidiary of Super Retail Group.

The company is the largest outdoor retailer in the Australia with 170 stores nationwide as of 2026, operating in every state and major territory.

== History ==
In December 2004, Super Cheap Auto Group acquired CampMart, a camping and outdoor leisure retailer with four stores in Brisbane, for $6.4 million. It used the acquisition as the foundation to launch its BCF Boating Camping Fishing business in October 2005.

== See also ==
- List of mountaineering equipment brands
- List of outdoor industry parent companies
