= Eric David Lloyd Jones =

Australian businessman (1885-1958)

- Born: 24 March 1885; Bickley; Burwood, New South Wales
- Died: 15 December 1958 (aged 73); Chatswood, New South Wales
- Education: Homebush Grammar School; Sydney Grammar School; University of Sydney
- Occupations: Director of David Jones; Friesian cattle breeder
- Spouses: Kathleen née Booth Jones (m. 1908; div. 1933) Lynette Edgell née Crozier (m. 1933; died 1948) Eleithia née Miller (m. 1950; div. 1953) Marian Elsie née Carrol (m. 1957)
- Children: 2 sons Philip & Mark; 2 daughters Betty & Patty
- Parent(s): Edward Lloyd Jones & Helen Ann Lloyd Jones (née Jones)

Eric David Lloyd Jones (24 March 1885–15 December 1958) was an Australian-born Wimbledon singles tennis player, Friesian cattle breeder and director of David Jones.

== Early life ==
Eric David Lloyd Jones was born in his parents home Bickley in Burwood, New South Wales, the youngest son of Edward Lloyd Jones and Helen Ann Lloyd Jones (née Jones). He was the grandson of David Jones founder of the department store bearing his name and the younger brother of Edward Lloyd Jones Jnr and Charles Lloyd Jones. He was educated at Homebush Grammar School and Sydney Grammar School. Lloyd Jones was awarded a Bachelor of Arts degree by the University of Sydney. He married Kathleen Booth Jones in 1908 at St. Anne's Anglican Church, Strathfield.

== Congregational Church ==
The extended Jones family were active members of the Congregational Church in Sydney. George Sydney Jones and Harry David Thompson were notable architects and cousins of Eric Lloyd Jones. They designed the Trinity Congregational Church in Strathfield that was given to that suburb by the Jones family.

== David Jones ==
In 1894 Edward Lloyd Jones Snr was killed in the Redfern Rail Disaster. At the time David Jones was still a private company but in 1906 it became a limited liability company. From 1906 until 1958 all three of his sons would be involved in the management of David Jones. Eric Lloyd Jones followed his brother Edward Lloyd Jones Jnr as a director of David Jones on his retirement to be become a cattle breeder.

== Tennis ==
A talented sportsman from 1906 Lloyd Jones was representing New South Wales in Australian tennis competitions. In 1926 he played in the men’s singles championships at Wimbledon.

== Cattle breeder ==
In 1919 having purchased considerable rural acreage in the Southern Highlands of New South Wales Lloyd Jones commissioned the fashionable Sydney architect James Peddle of the firm Peddle Thorp to design a commodious Californian style bungalow on his property out of Bundanoon. The property known as Lyndholme, after subdivision is now known as Spring Hill but, still stands on the outskirts of that historic village. It is listed on the Local Environmental Plan of Wingecarribee Shire Council as an important structure designed by a pioneering 20th century architect.

== Family and death ==
Lloyd Jones divorced his first wife Kathleen in 1933. After leaving his Bundanoon property he lived in Blachheath and died at his home in Chatswood in 1957 aged 73. He was survived by his fourth wife Marian who he had married earlier that year and was cremated at Northern Suburbs Crematorium in North Ryde.
