= Homebush Grammar School =

Non-denominational day school for boys

- Sydney, New South Wales; Australia

Information
- Type: Independent, day school
- Denomination: Non-denominational
- Established: 1892
- Status: Site was sold in 1915 and the building has been demolished.
- Closed: 1914
- Key people: W.B. Scott; J.H. Smairl

Homebush Grammar School was an independent non-denominational day school for boys located in Albert Road Strathfield, New South Wales. At the time Albert Road was listed as being in Homebush hence the name of the school.

== History ==
The school was founded in 1892 and ran until 1914 with the school site being sold in 1915 for residential development. The principal and proprietor of the school was W.B. Scott who was a graduate of Trinity College, Dublin. Scott had earlier been assistant principal to David Joseph Sly when in 1888 he opened Eton College in Homebush. That school closed in 1892 when Sly voluntarily became a bankrupt. On its foundation the second master of Homebush Grammar was J. H. Smairl B.A., a graduate of the University of Sydney. After being awarded a Master of Arts by Sydney University he became headmaster. When Homebush Grammar School closed Smairl was appointed an English and history teacher at Sydney Boys High School. In 1929 a portrait of Joseph Henry Smairl (1864-1937) was painted by Alfred Ernest MacDonald and was hung in the Archibald Prize exhibition at the Art Gallery of New South Wales. The following year the portrait was donated by his former pupils to Sydney High and still hangs in the stairwell at that selective high School. For many years a part time master at Homebush Grammar was Antonio Dattilo Rubbo who taught art at many other independent schools in Sydney. Although Homebush Grammar was a non-denominational school it had strong links to the Congregational churches in the Inner Western Suburbs of Sydney given many of its pupils belonged to that church. Trinity Congregational Church and Strathfield and Hombush Congregational Churches and ministers George Littlemore and Walter Cunliffe Jones often presided at special events such as end of year speech nights. In 1900, even after the schools enrolment had risen to over 60 boys, speech night at the end of the year was held in the school hall. That year the guest of honour who distributed the prizes was George Reid who later became the 4th Prime Mister of Australia. In later years speech night was held in the hall at the Burwood School of Arts.

== Student cohort ==
Homebush Grammar School acted as a feeder school for more historic and established Athletic Association of the Great Public Schools of New South Wales such as Sydney Grammar School and Newington College. Students attending the school came from wealthy and well known families who lived in Burwood, Strathfield and Homebush.

- Members of the Street family, an Australian dynasty of men and women renowned in vice-regal, legal and political circles attended the school.
- The sons of tobacco merchants George Frederick Todman and Wilheim von der Heyde, a mayor of Strathfield, lived in mansions on Albert Road and their sons were enrolled at Homebush Grammar.
- After his marriage in 1900 Samuel Hordern, scion of the retailing Hordern family, lived at Tuxedo in Albert Road Strathfield. Hordern's sons, and those of his sister Jane Walford, attended the school.
- The sons of Charles Hoskins, the wealthy steel and iron industrialist, including his sons and Wiesener grandsons attended Homebush Grammar when the family lived in a grand estate on The Boulevarde, Strathfield. Cecil Hoskins and all his brothers later attended Newington College.
- Grandchildren of David Jones who established the Sydney department store David Jones attended the school including all the sons of Edward Lloyd Jones Snr. After attending Homebush Grammar Eric Lloyd Jones attended Sydney Grammar before being awarded a Bachelor of Arts from the University of Sydney. He went on to be involved in the management of David Jones but at 38 left the family business to play tennis at Wimbledon and lost his money, wife and good name in the process.

Homebush Grammar closed before Australia entered World War I but former students that are known to have enlisted for active service and died include Leslie Arndell, Kenneth Jackson and Frank Uther.

- Private Leslie Reading Arndell, who attended Homebush Grammar and Newington College, was the son of Andrew and Amelia Arndell of Verona at 27 Coventry Road Strathfield and he was killed in action at Bullecourt France on 3 May 1917.
- Lance Corporal Kenneth Jackson, who attended Homebush Grammar and Newington College, was the son of Frederick and Jessie Jackson of The Glen at St Marys and was killed in action at Gallipoli on 28 April 1915.
- Gunner Frank Uther, who attended Homebush Grammar and Sydney Grammar schools, was the son of Henry and Caroline Uther of Marlborough at 94-96 Burlington Road Homebush and he died of wounds in Belgium 18 October 1917.

== Notable alumni ==
- Sir Norman Gregg
- Sir Cecil Hoskins
- Sir Charles Lloyd Jones
- Sir Kenneth Street

== Notable teachers ==
- Antonio Dattilo Rubbo

== Strathfield Grammar School ==
After the death of Sir Philip Sydney Jones in 1918 his property Llandilo on the Boulevarde Strathfield was subdivided and a group of residents headed by Frank Wheaton, a minister of the Congregational Church, bought the house and converted it into Strathfield Grammar School. In 1926 it became part of Trinity Grammar School. Later Llandilo became the preparatory school of Trinity.
