= George Sydney Jones =

Australian architect (1864-1927)

George Sydney Jones FRAIA
- Born: 1 July 1864; Strathfield, New South Wales, Australia
- Died: 19 January 1927 (aged 62); Kings Tableland, New South Wales, Australia
- Education: Sydney Grammar School
- Occupation: Architect
- Children: 3 daughters
- Parent: Philip Sydney Jones

George Sydney Jones (1 July 1864–19 January 1927) was an Australian-born English-trained Architect. He is notable for pioneering the use of flat roofs in domestic architectural designs in the Sydney suburbs of Strathfield, Beecroft and Pennant Hills.

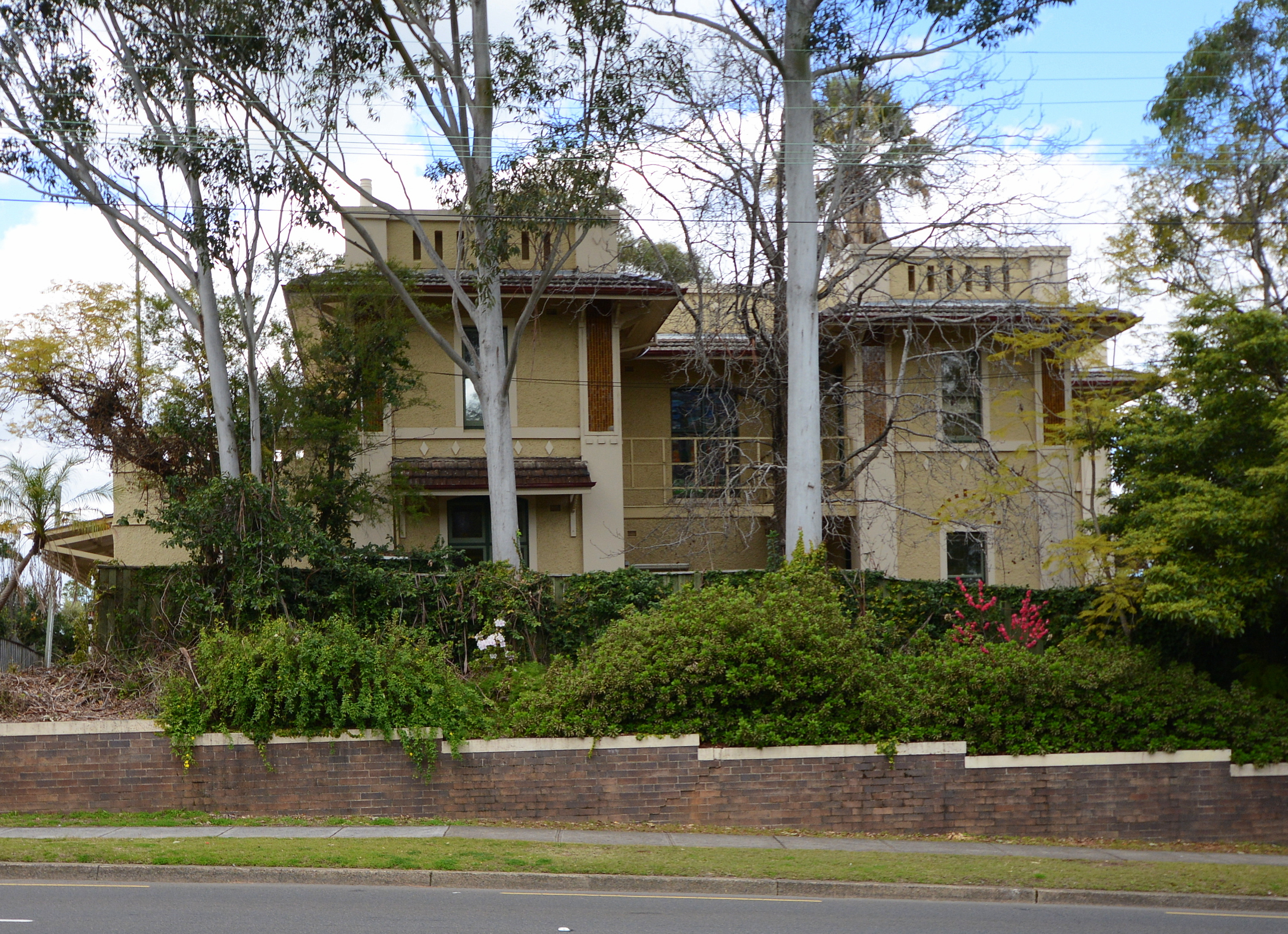
Rochester is a flat roofed house in Beecroft

== Early life ==
Jones was born in Strathfield, the eldest son of Hannah and Philip Sydney Jones. He was the grandson of David Jones founder of the department store bearing his name. He was educated at Sydney Grammar School. After finishing school in Sydney Jones was articled to an English architect in London qualifying to be an associate of the Royal Institute of British Architecture in 1890.

== Architectural career ==
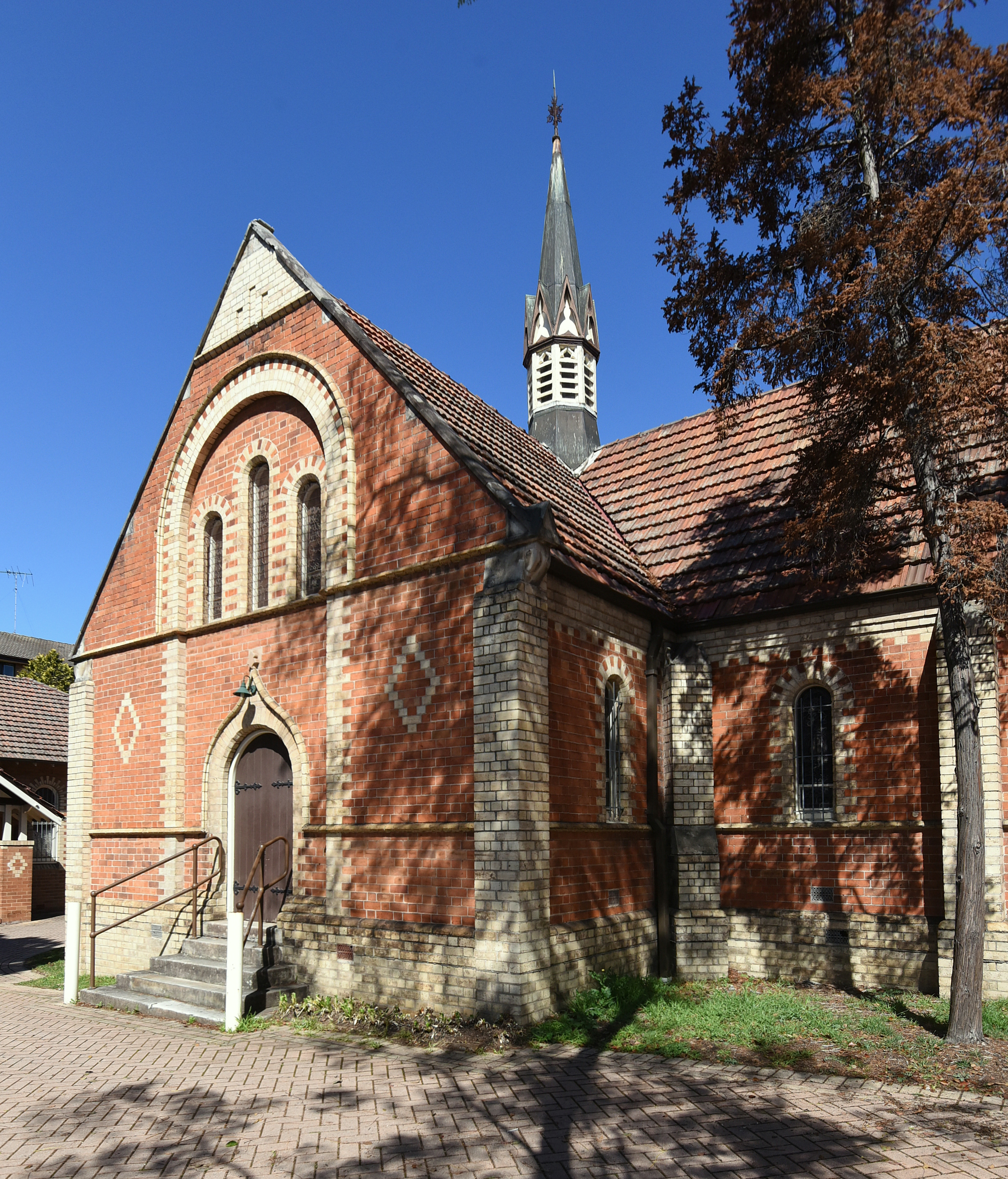
Trinity Church in Strathfield

He returned to Australia in 1891 and started his own architectural practice. He was elected a Fellow of the New South Wales Institute of Architects in 1901. He was editor of Art & Architecture magazine from 1909 until 1912 and was president of the Institute of Architects twice from 1912 until 1914 and 1920 until 1921. Jones designed numerous houses in the Sydney suburb of Strathfield where he was born and grew up. Still extant are Springfort built in 1894, Darenth built in 1895 and Luleo built in 1912, although now much altered. Standing at 105 The Boulevarde Strathfield, on the corner of Albyn Road, the house is now the residence of the Bishop of the Maronite Church in Australia. Weemabah built in 1913 at 74-76 Homebush Road, Strathfield is listed is on the RAIA NSW Register of Twentieth Century Buildings of Significance and is now part of St Martha's Primary School, a Roman Catholic school.

The Jones family were active members of the Congregational Church in Sydney. Jones and his cousin Harry Thompson designed the Trinity Congregational Church that was given to the Strathfield parish their family.
