= Strathfield =

Suburb of Sydney, Australia

- Suburb
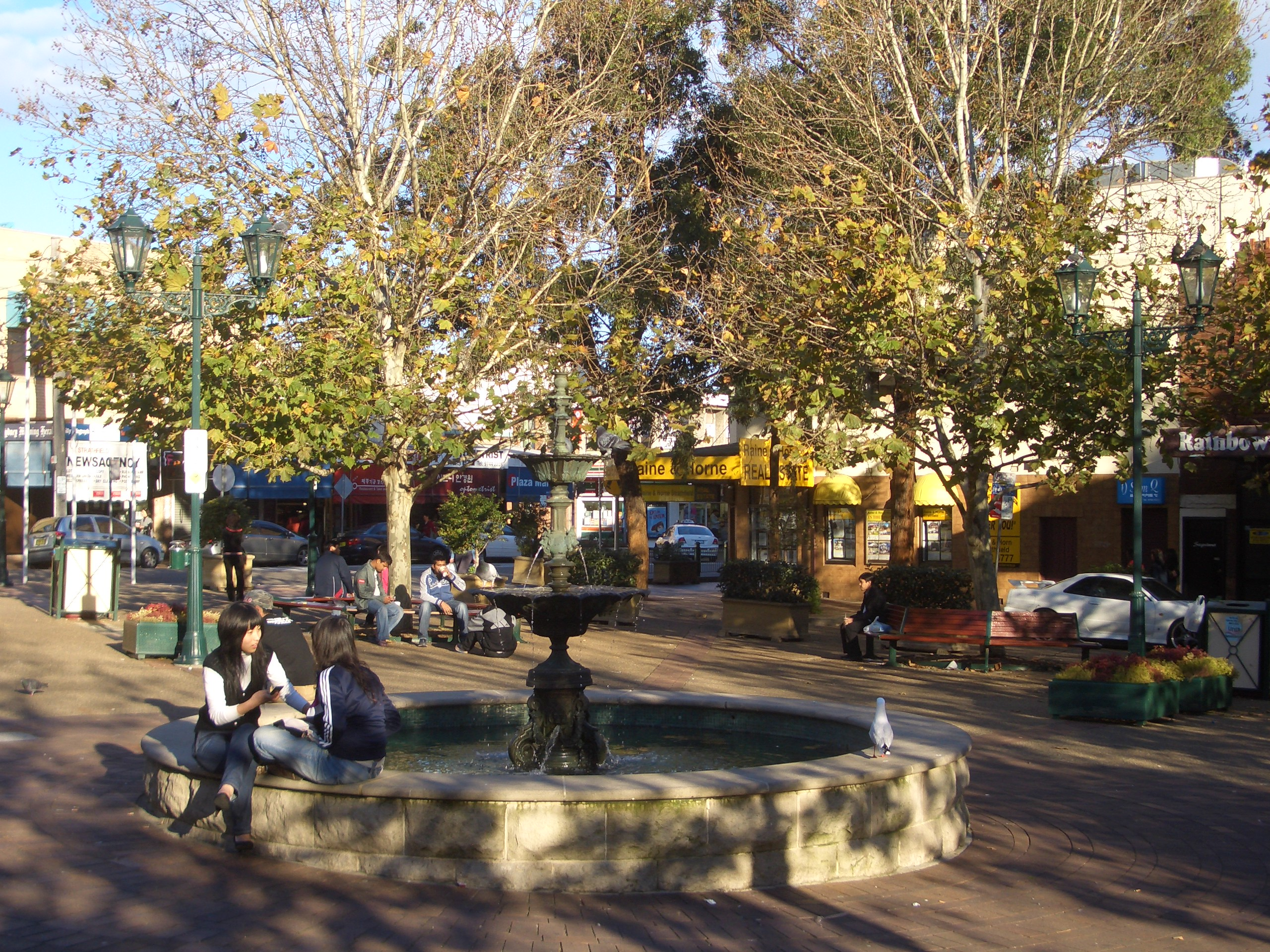
- Strathfield Square

- Interactive map of Strathfield
- Country: Australia
- State: New South Wales
- City: Sydney
- LGAs: Municipality of Strathfield; City of Canada Bay; Municipality of Burwood
- Location: 13.8 km (8.6 mi) west of Sydney CBD
- Established: c.1868

Government
  - State electorate: Strathfield
  - Federal divisions: Reid; Watson

Area
  - Total: 6.57 km^{2} (2.54 sq mi)
- Elevation: 20 m (66 ft)

Population
  - Total: 25,915 (SAL 2021)
- Postcode: 2135
Suburbs around Strathfield
Flemington	Homebush	North Strathfield / Concord
Rookwood	Strathfield	Burwood
Belfield	Strathfield South	Enfield

Strathfield is a suburb in the Inner West of Sydney, in the state of New South Wales, Australia. It is located 13.8 kilometres west of the Sydney central business district and is the administrative centre of the Municipality of Strathfield. A small section of the suburb north of the Main Suburban railway line lies within the City of Canada Bay, while the area east of The Boulevard lies within the Municipality of Burwood. North Strathfield and Strathfield South are separate suburbs to the north and south, respectively.

== History ==
The Strathfield district lies between the Concord Plains to the north and the Cooks River to the south, and was originally occupied by the Wangal clan. European colonisation in present-day Strathfield commenced in 1793 with the issue of land grants in the area of "Liberty Plains", an area including present-day Strathfield as well as surrounding areas, where the first free settlers received land grants.

In 1808, a grant was made to James Wilshire, which forms the largest part of the current suburb of Strathfield. This grant was bounded by present-day The Boulevarde, Chalmers Street and Liverpool Road. Wiltshire's 1 square kilometre (0.39 sq mi) grant by Governor Macquarie in 1808 [regranted 1810] followed representations from Lord Nelson, a relation by marriage of Wilshire.

In the west, Wiltshire's grant neighboured an area that was granted in 1823 to the Church of England, to support clergy in the colony, which covered the western part of present-day Strathfield and Homebush West. The church lands were sold in 1841

Ownership of Wiltshire's grant was transferred in 1824 to ex-convict Samuel Terry. The land became known as the Redmire Estate, which Michael Jones says could either be named after his home town Redmire in North Yorkshire, England, or could be named after the "red clay of the Strathfield area".

The railway came to Strathfield in 1855, with Homebush railway station built as one of the initial four stations on the Main Suburban railway line between Sydney and Parramatta. A station was sited here because of the presence of Homebush Racecourse north of Parramatta Road. The arrival of the railway spurred residential development. Subdivision of the "Redmire Estate" began in 1867, which led to residential development forming the village of "Redmire" or "Redmyre".

An early buyer was one-time Mayor of Sydney, Walter Renny who built in 1868 a house they called Stratfieldsaye, possibly after the Duke of Wellington's mansion near Reading, Berkshire. It may have also been named after the transport ship of the same name that transported many immigrants – including Sir Henry Parkes – to Australia, though the transport ship was probably also named after the Duke's mansion as it was built soon after his death and was likely named in his honour.

A plaque marking the location of Stratfield Saye is in the footpath of Strathfield Avenue, marking the approximate location of the original house, though some of the wording on the plaque is incorrect. According to local historian Cathy Jones, "ownership of [Stratfieldsaye] was transferred several times, including to Davidson Nichol, who shortened the name to 'Strathfield House', then 'Strathfield'." In 1877, development had progressed sufficiently to justify the addition of a halt on the railway line at Redmyre, east of existing Homebush station. The Village of Homebush Estate, part of which forms the northern part of today's Strathfield, was subdivided in 1878.

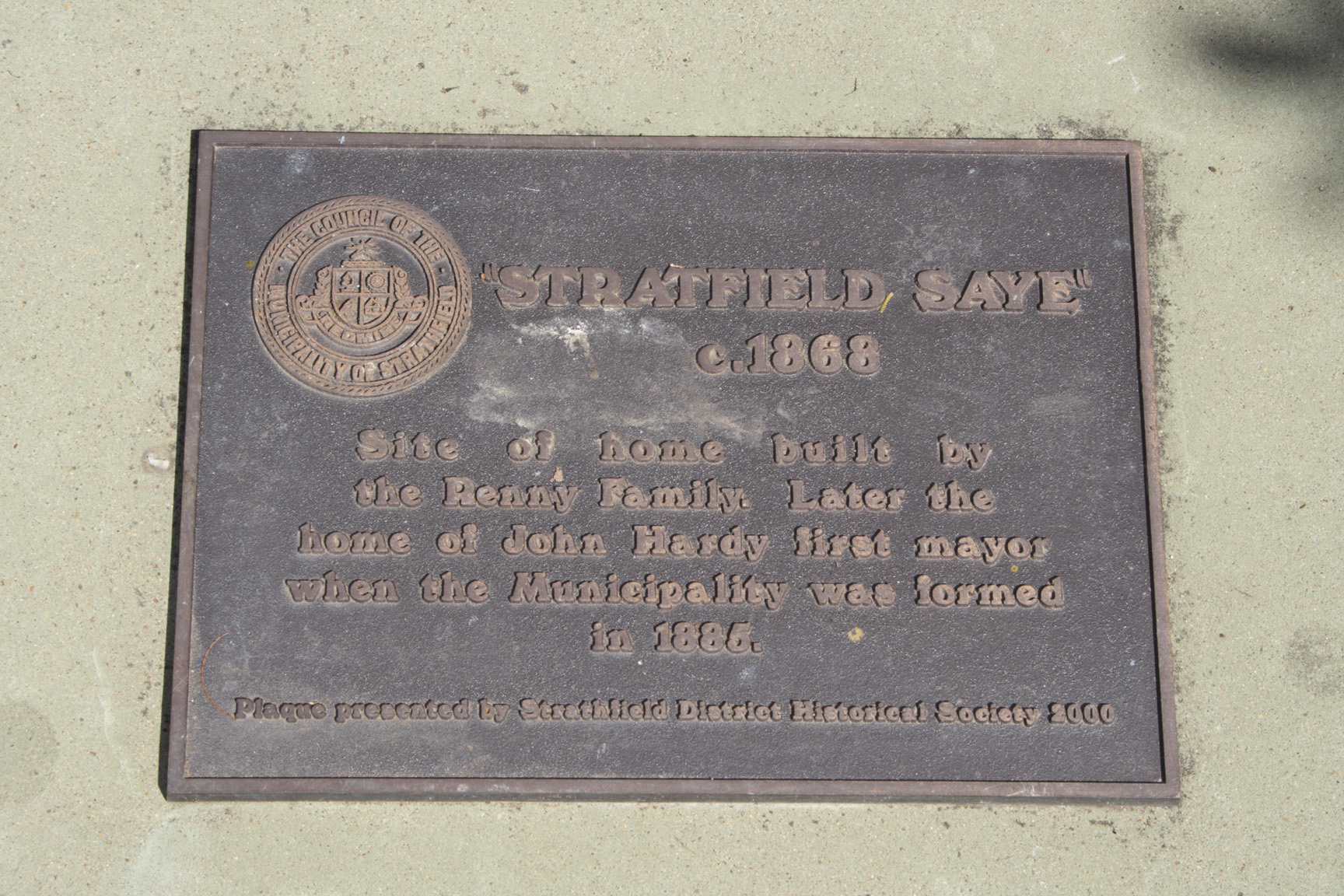
A plaque marking where the Strathfield Saye home stood

By 1885, sufficient numbers of people lived in the district to enable incorporation of its own local government. "Strathfield" as a geographical name was first established when Strathfield Council was proclaimed on 2 June 1885 by the Governor of NSW, Sir Augustus Loftus, after residents of the Redmire area petitioned the New South Wales State government for the establishment of local government. The new local government area included parts of the three established residential areas of Redmire (now central Strathfield), Homebush (now Homebush South and northern Strathfield) and Druitt Town (now southern Strathfield). Residents in Homebush and Druitt Town formed their own unsuccessful counter-petition.

It is likely that the region was named Strathfield to neutralise the rivalry between Homebush and Redmire. The railway station was renamed Strathfield in 1885, and became an important interchange station when the Main North railway line was opened the following year, between Strathfield and Hornsby.

=== Strathfield Council ===
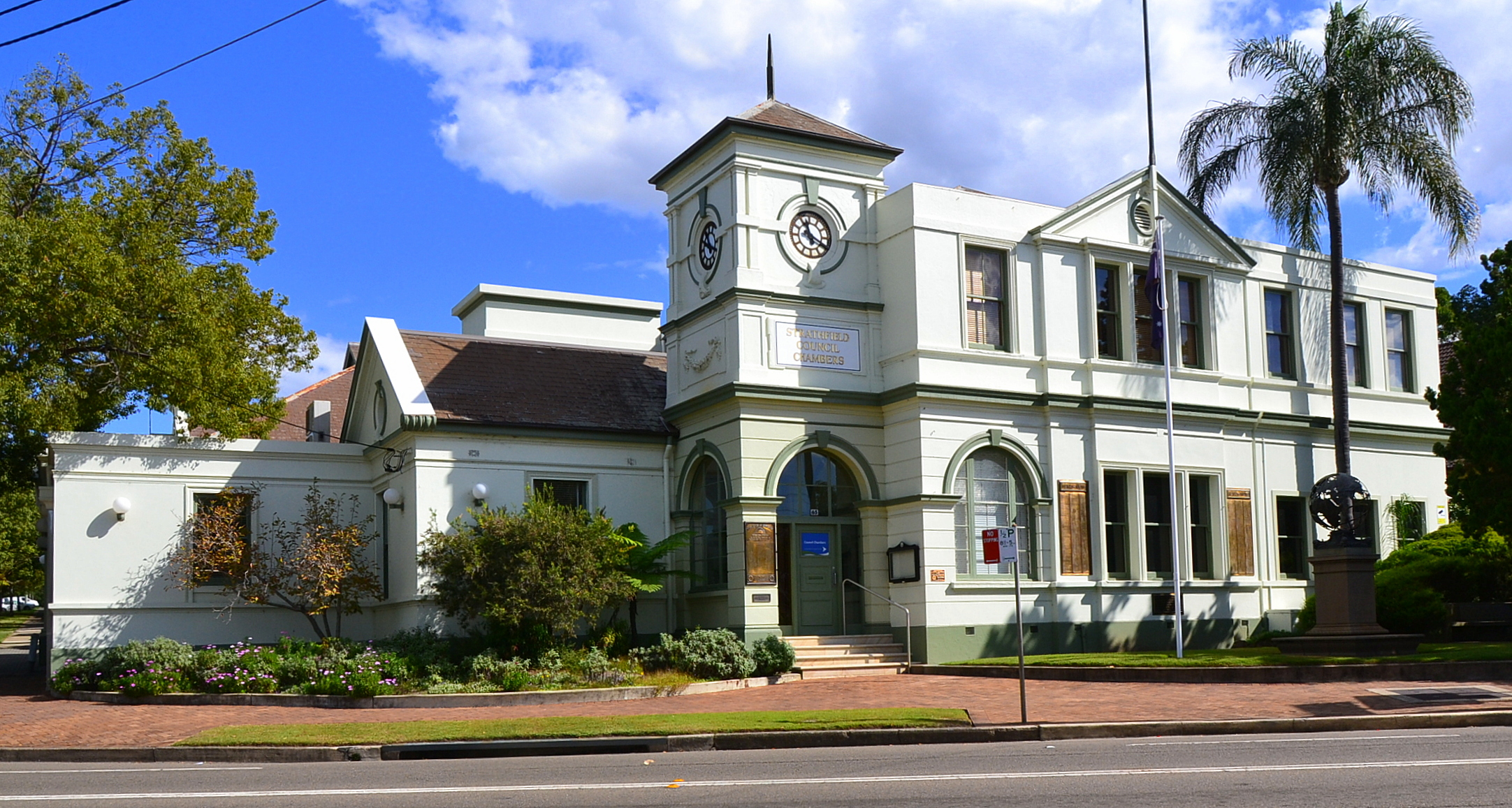
Council Chambers

In 1885, Strathfield Council was incorporated and included parts of the then-established suburbs of Redmire, Homebush and Druitt Town. The part of Redmire incorporated into Strathfield Council included the central part of today's suburb of Strathfield. The part of Homebush incorporated into Strathfield included the southern part of today's suburb of Homebush and the northern part of today's Strathfield (Village of Homebush or Homebush South). The part of Druitt Town incorporated into Strathfield included the southern part of today's Strathfield. In directories, addresses in all three areas were included under "Strathfield" after the council was established.

The adjoining areas of Flemington, North Homebush and southern Druitt Town was unincorporated. The southern part of Flemington was annexed to Strathfield Council in 1892 (now the southern part of Homebush West and the western part of Strathfield), which increased the size of the Council area by about 50%. The Council formed three wards – Flemington, Homebush and Strathfield – and Aldermen was elected to represent their ward at Council. Wards were abolished in 1916.

Today's suburb of Strathfield encompasses the entire Council area as enlarged in 1892, except for a small area immediately to the south of Homebush and Flemington stations: the village centres immediately south of Homebush and Flemington stations were carved out of Strathfield and joined with the area formerly in Homebush Council in the late 20th century, creating the modern suburbs of Homebush and Flemington (Homebush West).

Meanwhile, the southern part of Druitt Town which was not incorporated into Strathfield became part of Enfield Council, then was amalgamated into Strathfield Council in 1949 and renamed Strathfield South.

The eastern part of former Redmire – renamed Strathfield – became part of Burwood Council. The boundary between Strathfield and Burwood was a straight line running north–south aligned with the Boulevarde, and as a result there was a small portion to the north of Strathfield Council boundaries and west of Burwood Council boundaries that was not part of either council. This portion became part of Concord Council, later combined into the City of Canada Bay. This has resulted in the modern suburb of Strathfield being split between the three councils.

From 1911 to 1921, Strathfield's population saw a rapid expansion, rising by 100%, outpacing the broader Sydney average of 42.8%. Strathfield Council passed the Residential District Proclamation, banning industries, commercial zones, and high-density flats to preserve a suburban low-density, single-family character.

=== Residential and commercial development ===
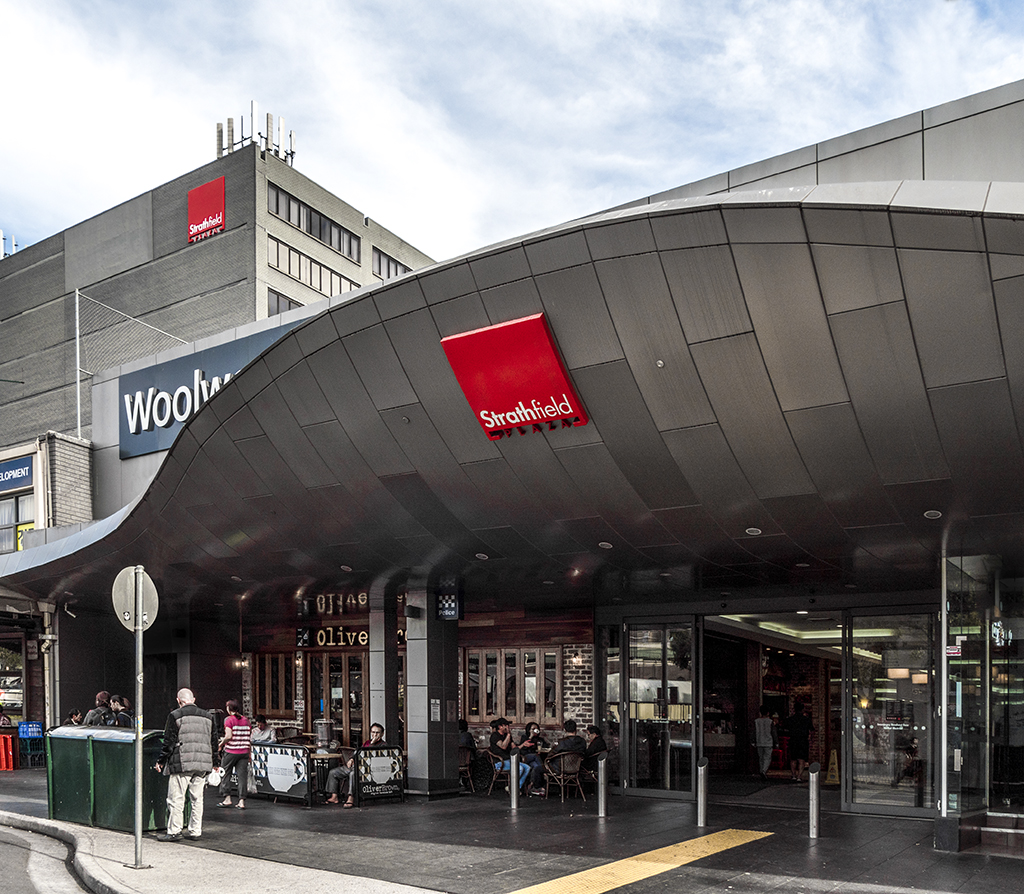
Strathfield Plaza

In the late 19th and early 20th centuries, the suburb of Strathfield became a popular residential suburb. The building of Strathfield station, and its expansion into a major suburban, intercity and interstate station, with direct services to Sydney Central, Melbourne and Canberra, helped to make the suburb one of the most accessible in Sydney by rail. It was also close to major road and water transport routes. Members of Sydney's business elite, such as the family of William Arnott and David Jones, built large homes in Strathfield.

After federation, Strathfield continued to be favoured by business and political leaders, with prime ministers Earle Page, George Reid and Frank Forde all having lived in the suburb. Billy Hughes lived in the part of Strathfield which is now Homebush South. Page chose to live in Strathfield because of its direct rail services to Melbourne, then the seat of federal parliament, and his electorate on the north coast of New South Wales. Some of the large homes built in this period were purchased by private schools, and the unusually large number of private and public schools in the one suburb further increased residential demand.

Following the introduction of the Local Government Act in 1919, Strathfield Council was one of the first to proclaim the major part of its area a residential district by proclamation in 1920. Strathfield underwent suburban subdivision in the early 20th century, with more suburban houses on smaller lots being built rather than the substantial mansions with expansive grounds built in the earlier period. Nevertheless, it remained a popular residential area. In 1977, Strathfield was the most expensive suburb in metropolitan Sydney measured by median house price.

More significant commercial development took place in the last quarter of the 20th century, with a modern shopping centre, Strathfield Plaza, opening in 1981, accompanied by the first high rise residential apartment building in the suburb. More towers followed in the next few decades, concentrated around the station.

On 17 August 1991, the Strathfield Plaza was the site of a tragic mass shooting known as the Strathfield massacre. This incident resulted in the loss of eight lives, including the perpetrator, and left six others wounded.

== Demographics ==
Historical population
Year	Pop.	±%
2001	20,567	—
2006	20,481	−0.4%
2011	23,639	+15.4%
2016	25,813	+9.2%
2021	25,915	+0.4%

According to the 2021 census, Strathfield had a total population of 25,915 people, a slight increase compared to 25,813 in 2016.

In 2021, 34.6% of people were born in Australia. The most common other countries of birth were Nepal 13.6%, China 8.6%, India 6.8%, South Korea 6.2%, and Vietnam 3.1%. The most common ancestries were Chinese 21.7%, Nepalese 13.0%, English 8.2%, Australian 7.7% and Korean 7.7%. 76.7% of people had both parents born overseas. Despite the concentration of Korean restaurants and businesses in the town centre, according to the 2021 census, the Chinese and Anglo-Celtic ancestry groups are much larger than the Korean ancestry group. In recent years, there has also been a sharp rise in Nepalese arrivals: in the previous census in 2016, Nepal was not within the top five countries of ancestral origin.

29.4% of people only spoke English at home. Other languages spoken at home included Nepali 12.9%, Mandarin 9.3%, Cantonese 7.2%, Korean 7.1% and Arabic 4.8%. The most common responses for religion were No Religion 23.1%, Catholic 21.8%, Hinduism 20.8% and Buddhism 7.2%.

== Heritage listings ==
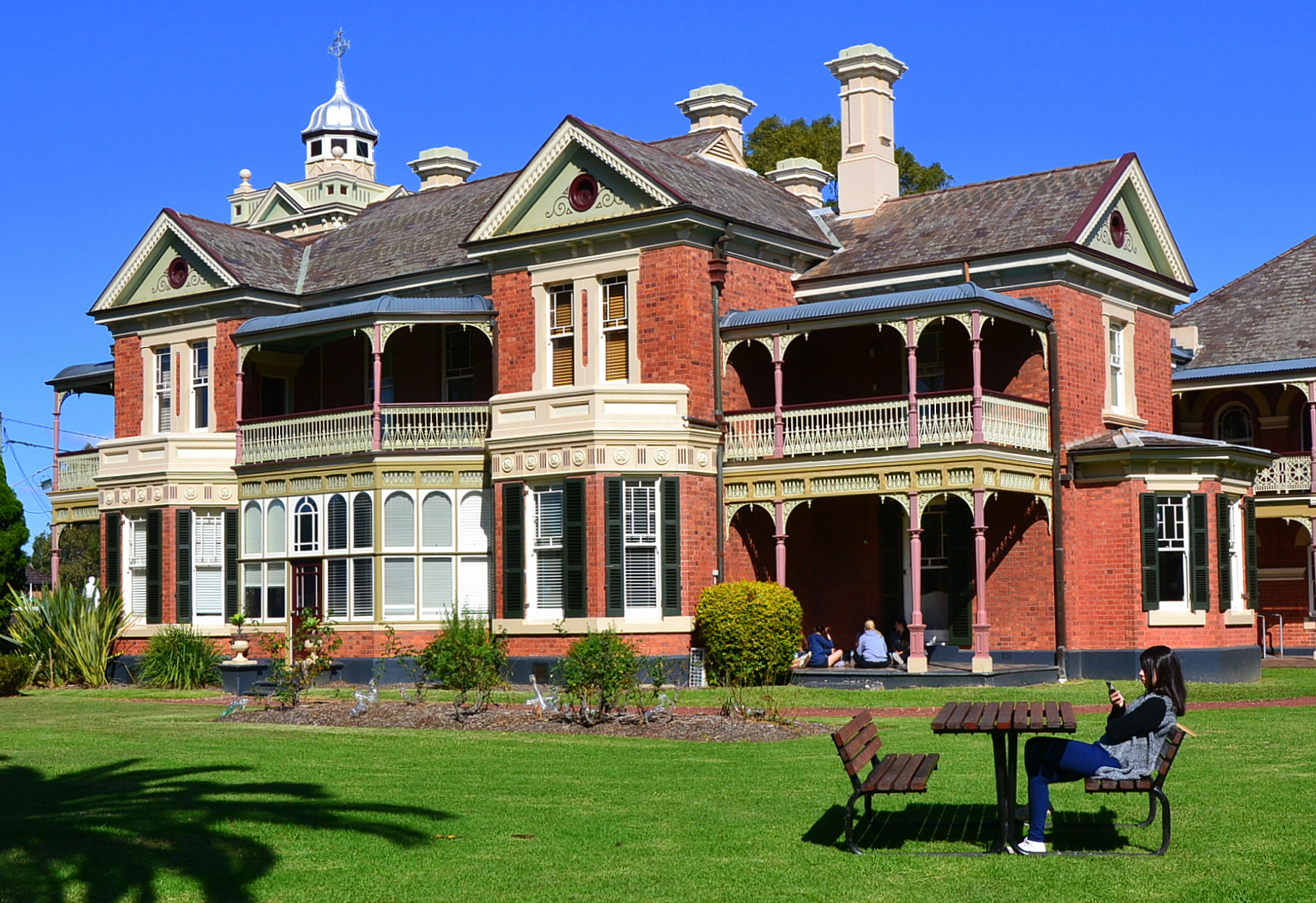
Mount Royal designed by Harry Kent is now the Mount St Mary Campus of the Australian Catholic University.

Strathfield has a number of heritage-listed sites, including:

- 25A Barker Road Strathfield
  Mount St Mary Campus of the Australian Catholic University
- Great Southern and Western railway Strathfield
  Strathfield rail underbridges
- Great Southern and Western railway Strathfield
  Strathfield railway station
- 62 The Boulevarde Strathfield
  Trinity Uniting Church, Strathfield
- St Anne's Roman Catholic Church
  St Annes Square, Strathfield South

== Education ==
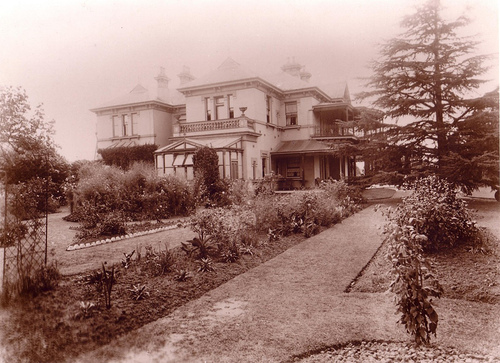
Llandilo was built in the 1860s for Sir Philip Sydney Jones and is now part of Trinity Grammar Preparatory School

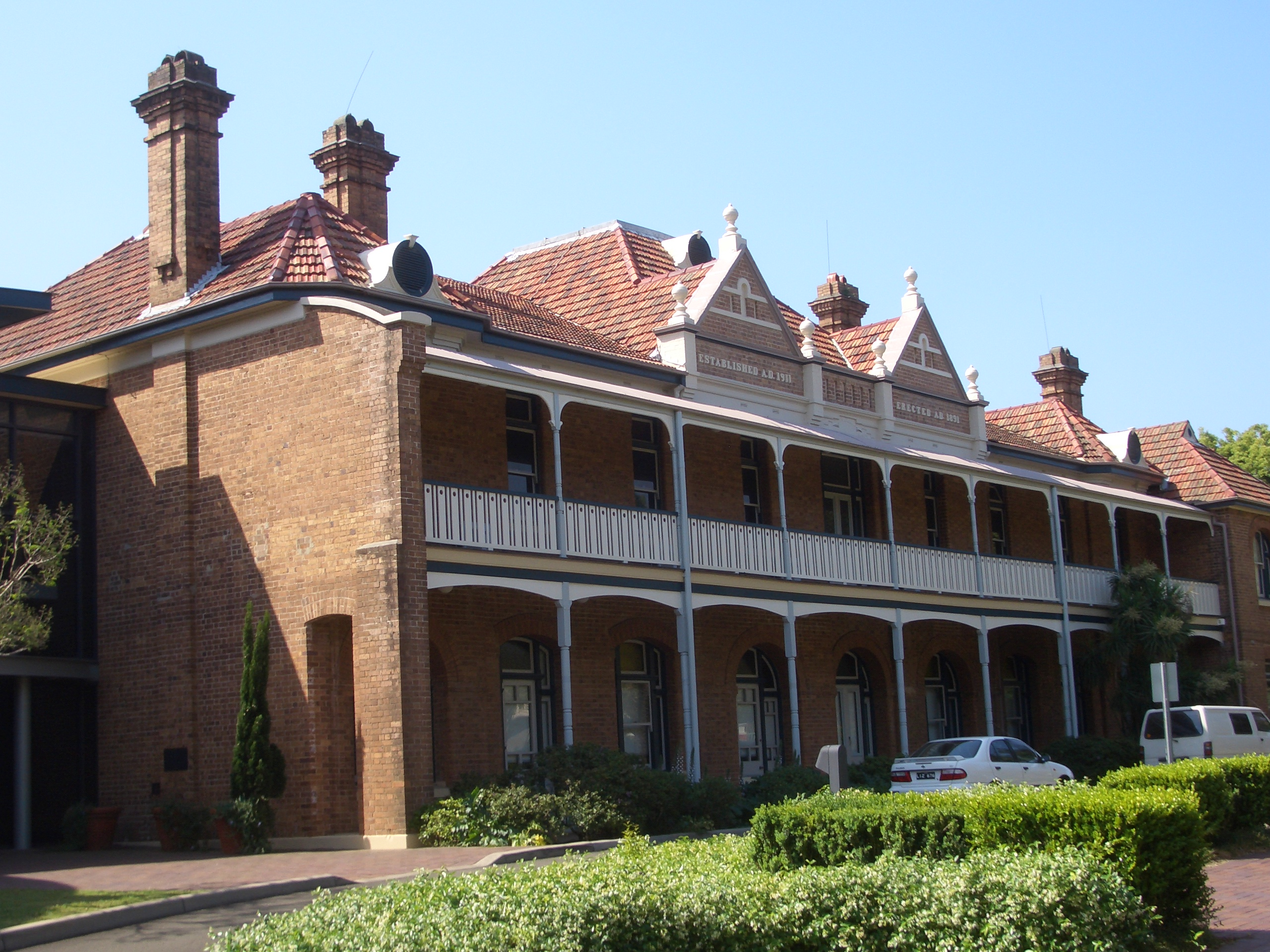
The Strathfield Catholic Institute designed in 1891 by Harry Kent

Independent or church-affiliated schools in Strathfield include:

- St Patrick's College
- Santa Sabina College
- Meriden Anglican School for Girls
- Trinity Grammar School Preparatory School and has classes from Pre-Kindergarten to Year 6.
- Strathfield Girls High School

Strathfield is home to a major campus of the Australian Catholic University, the former home of the Christian Brothers novitiate and Catholic Teachers' College. The Seminary of the Good Shepherd, which trains Catholic priests, straddles the boundary between Strathfield and Homebush. The Catholic Institute of Sydney, where priests for the Archdiocese of Sydney, and other theologians and ministers are trained, is in Strathfield, on a site which was originally the NSW Society for the Blind, and later an Australia Post training centre. Arnottholme at 65-69 Albert Road, Strathfield, the former home of William Arnott was for many years owned by the NSW Department of Education until its sale in 2022 for $7,700,000.

== Religious buildings ==
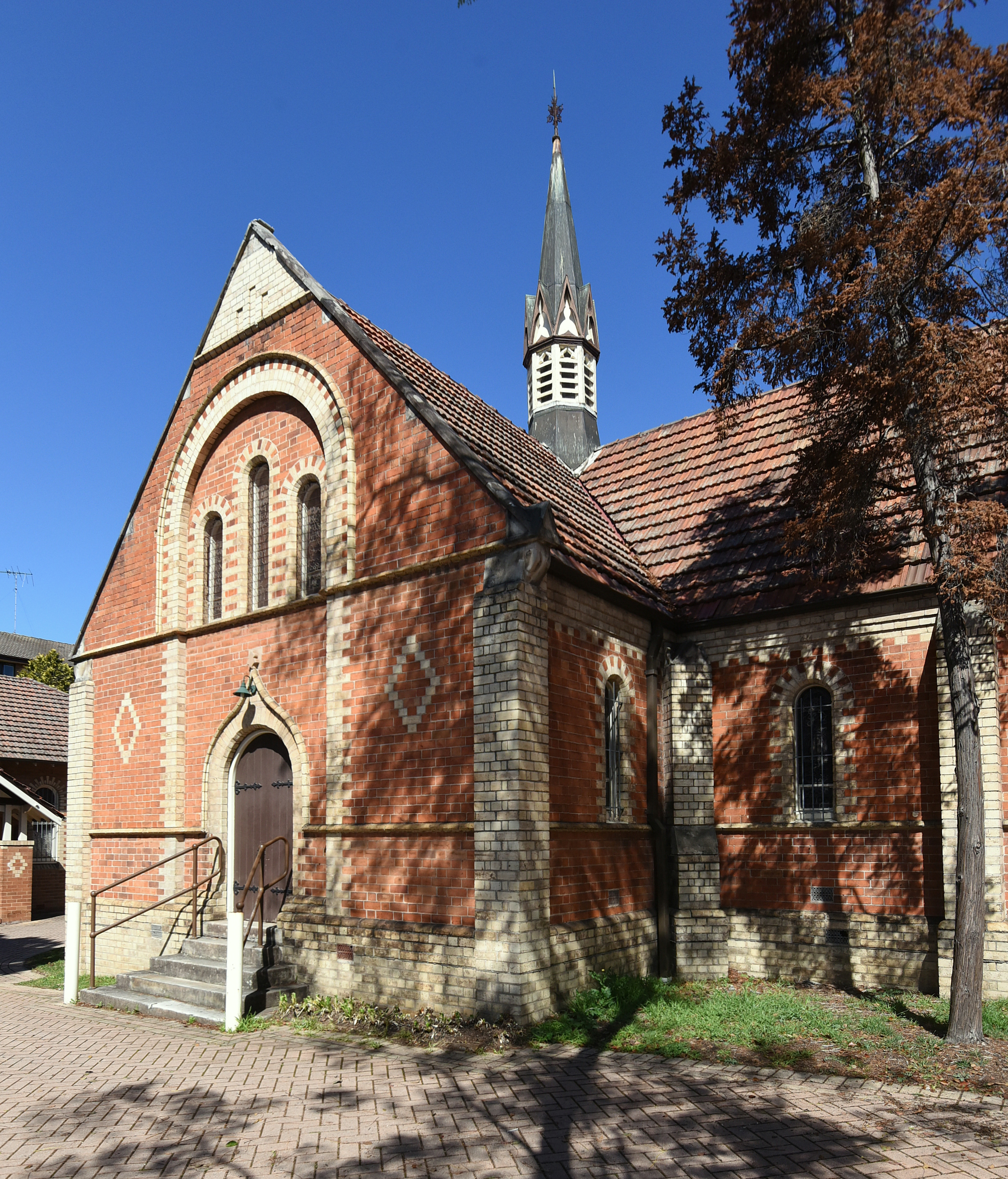
Trinity Uniting Church

Local churches include Trinity Uniting Church, Strathfield.

== Built environment ==
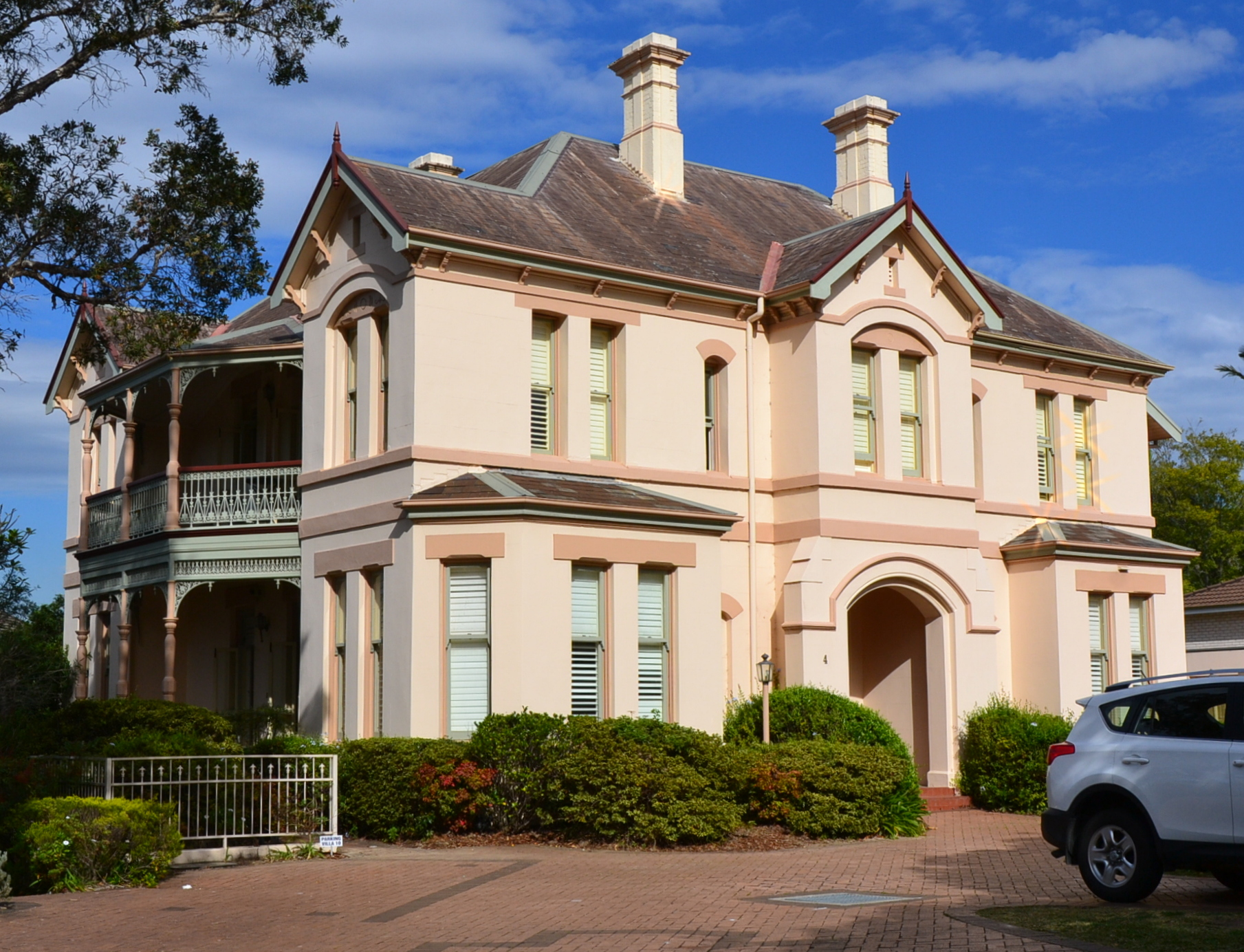
Woodstock built in 1886 to a design by Harry Chambers Kent has been converted into apartments

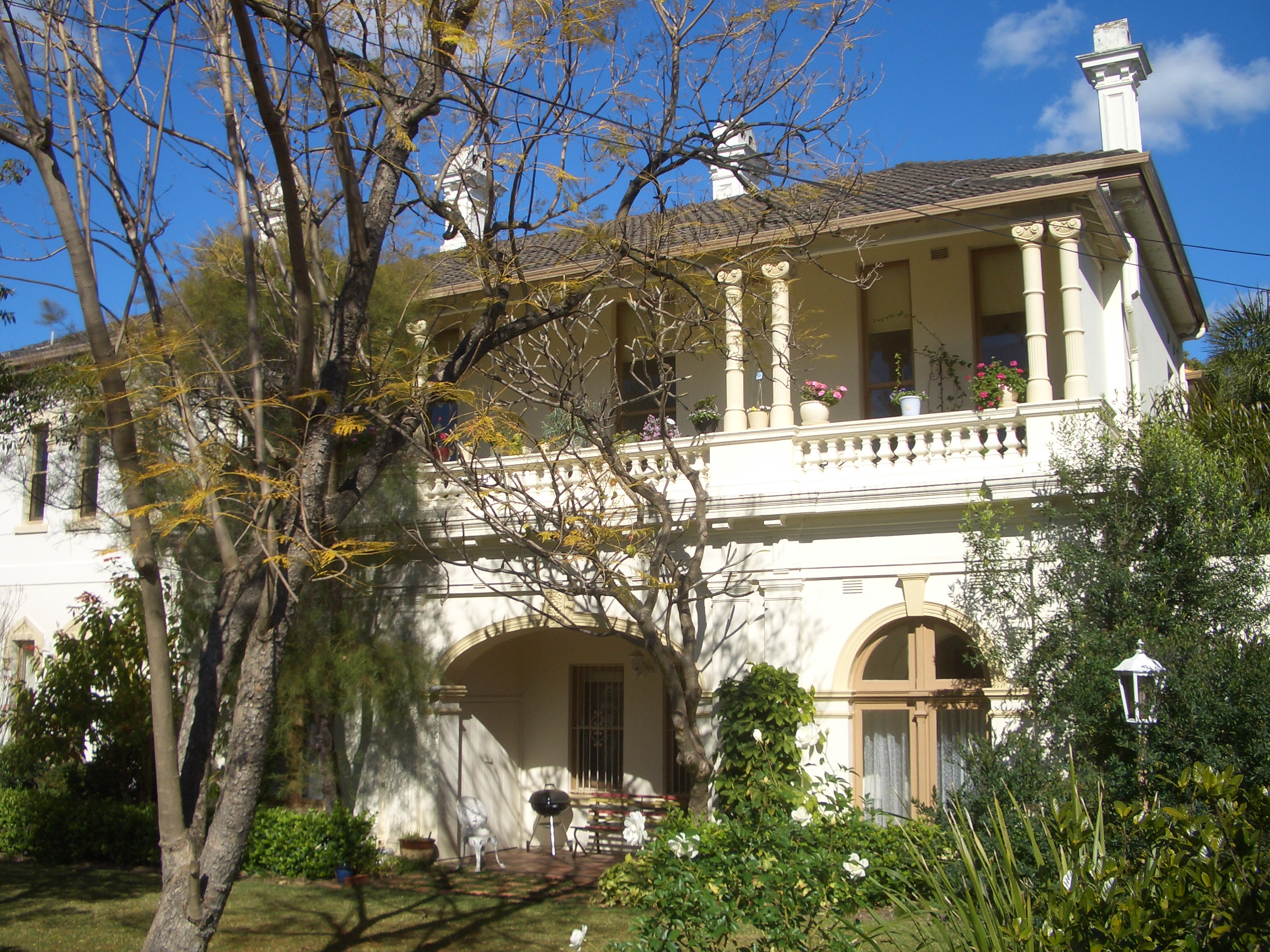
Glen Luna built in 1888 for Dr George Sly to design by Charles Slatyer has been converted into apartments

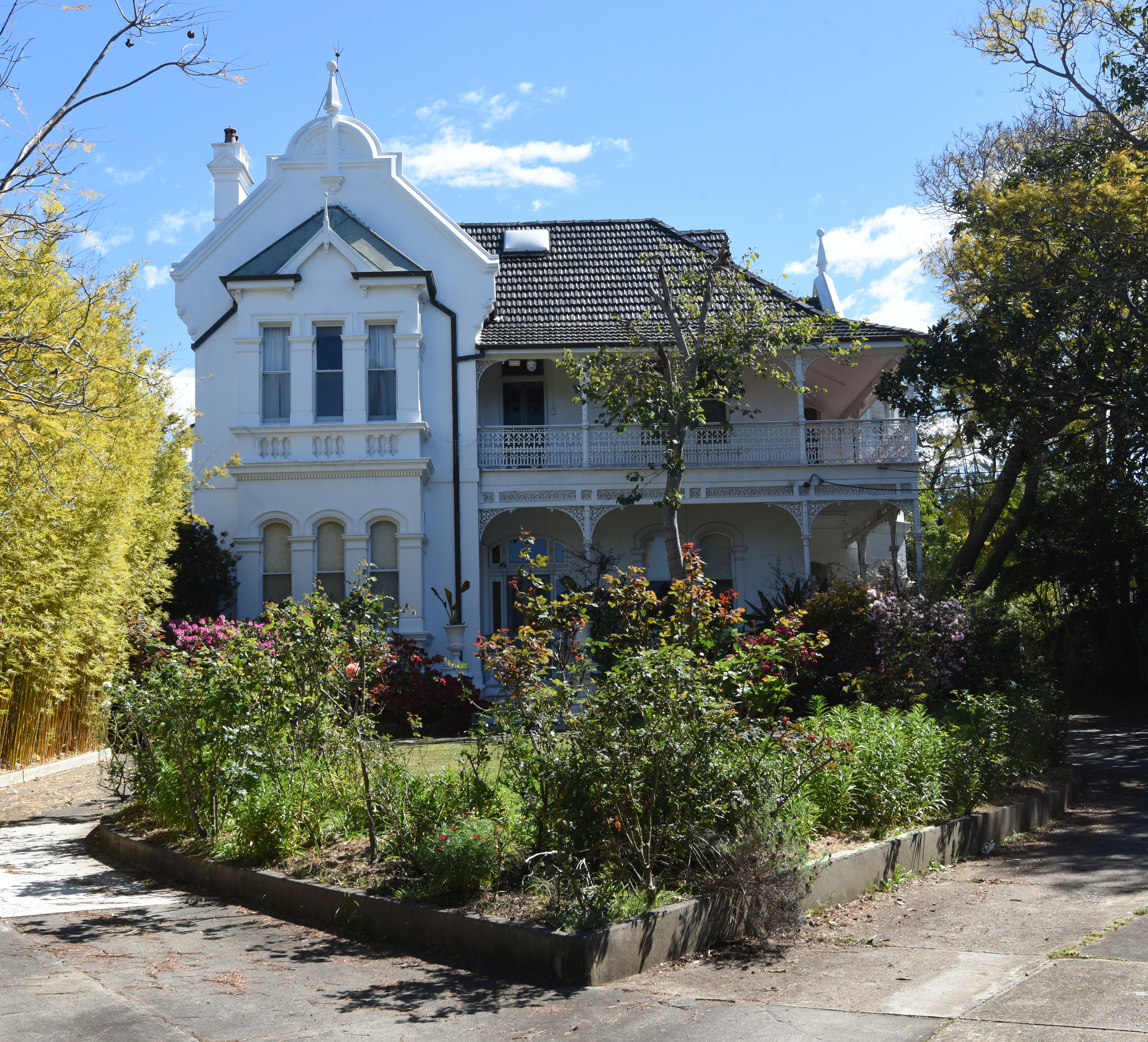
Quisiana built c.1893 is one of Strathfield's most prominent Victorian Italianate houses and is a heritage listed property

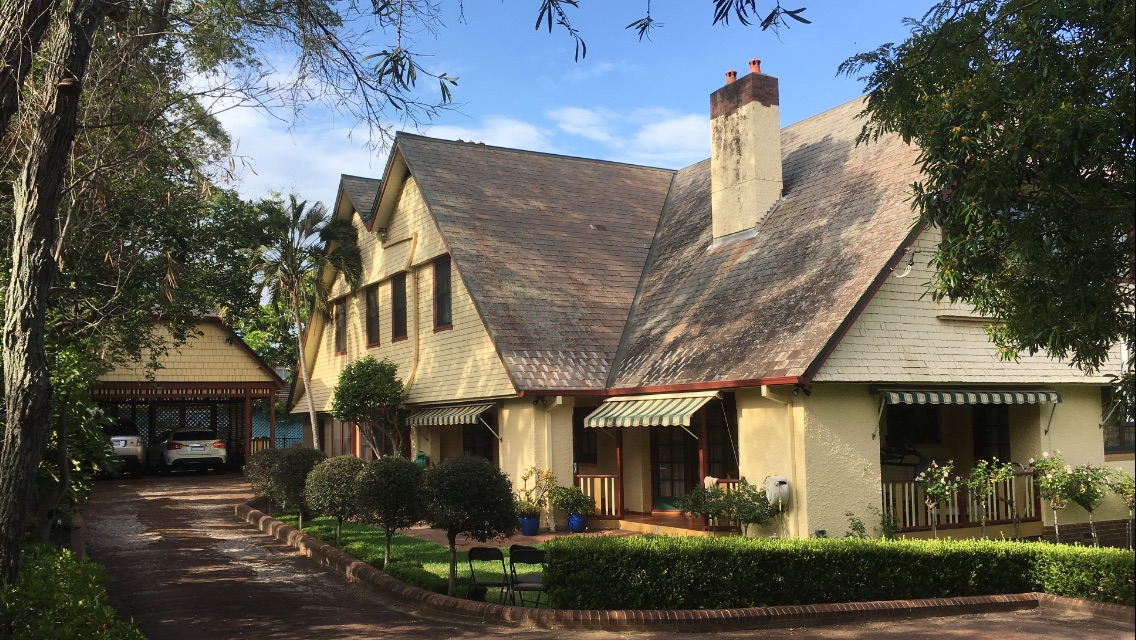
Kama built in 1913 to a design by Thomas Pollard Sampson

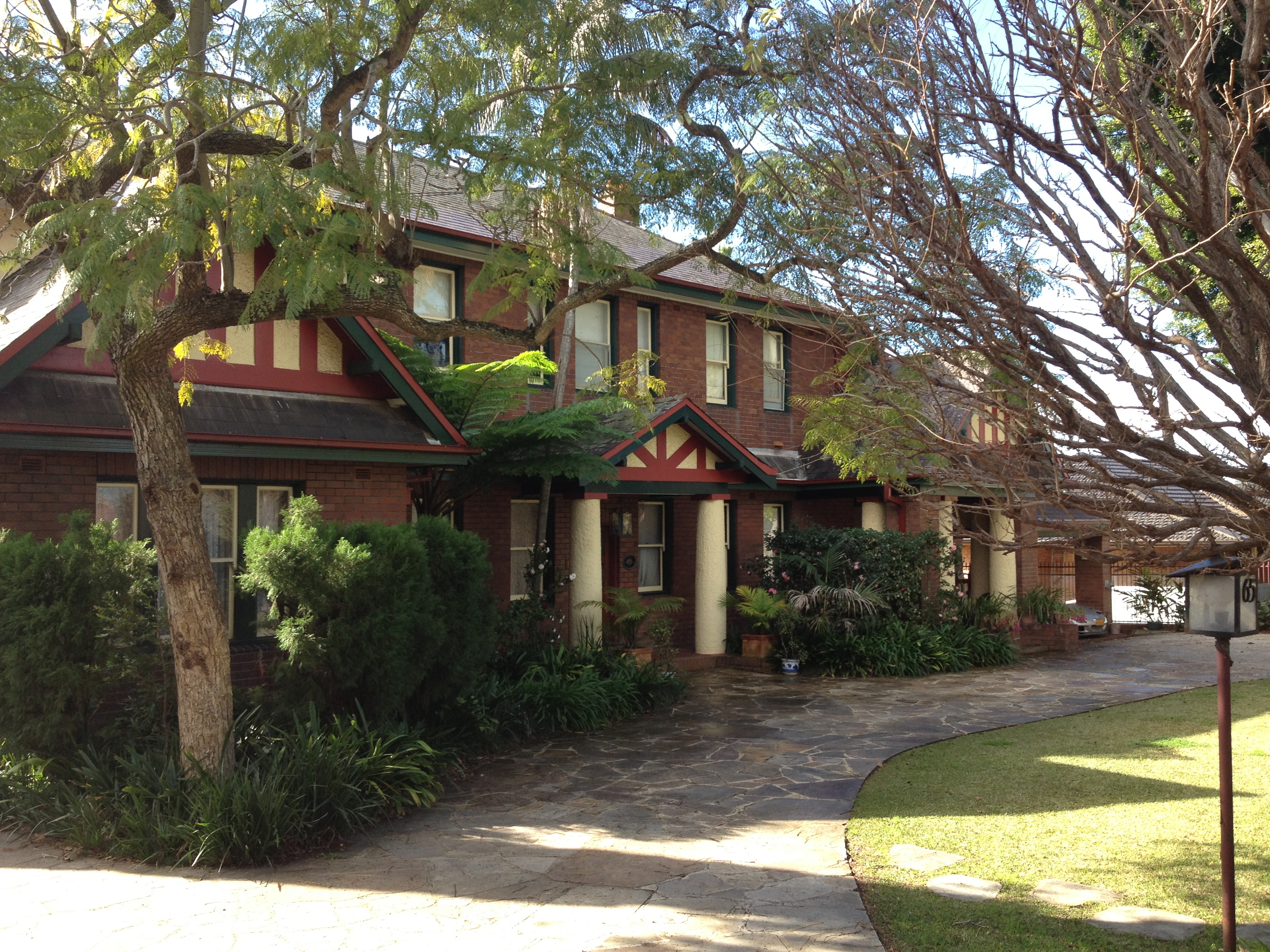
Yeulba built in 1914 to a design by Carlyle Greenwell

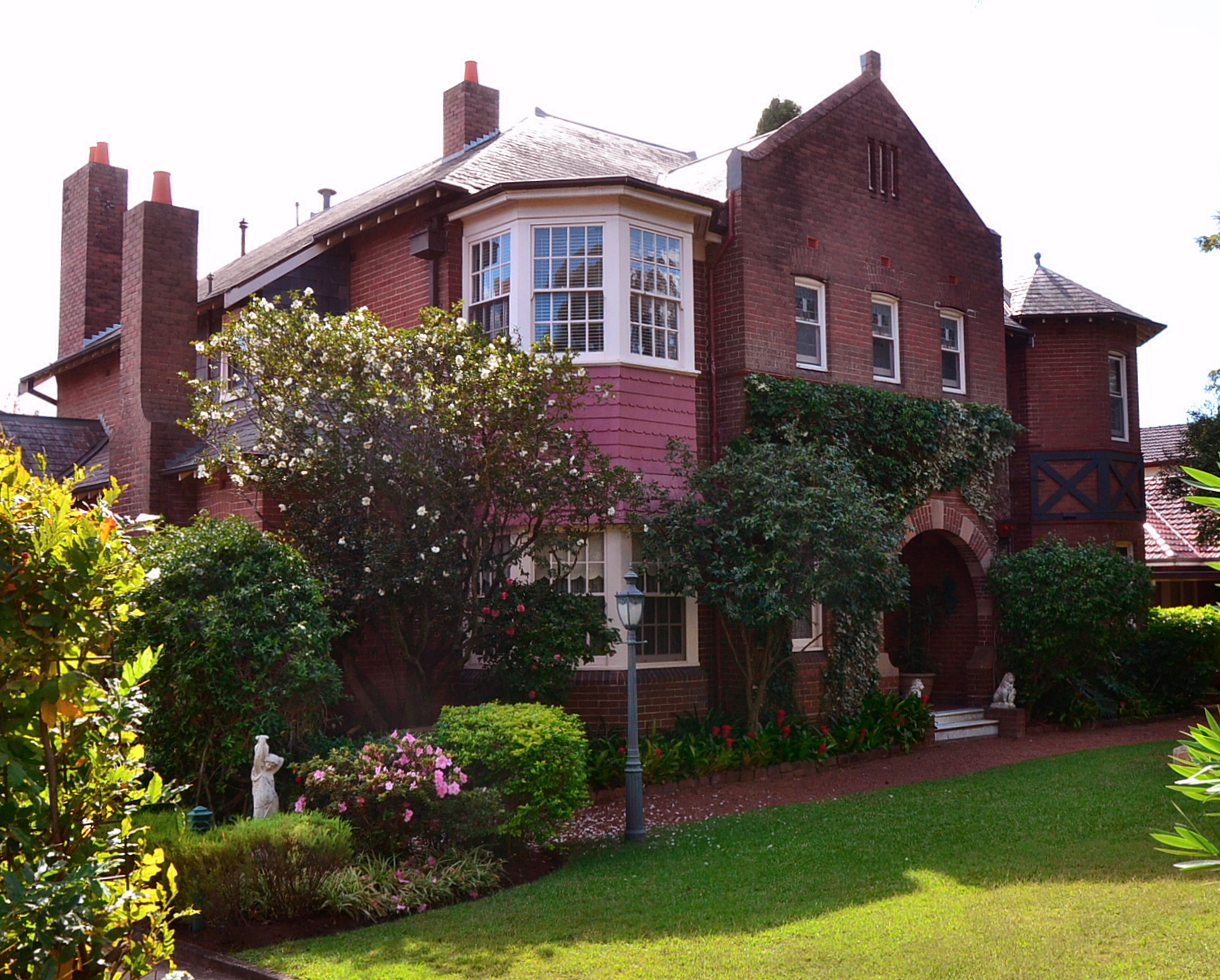
Inglethorpe built in 1916 to a design by Charles Slatyer (1856–1919)

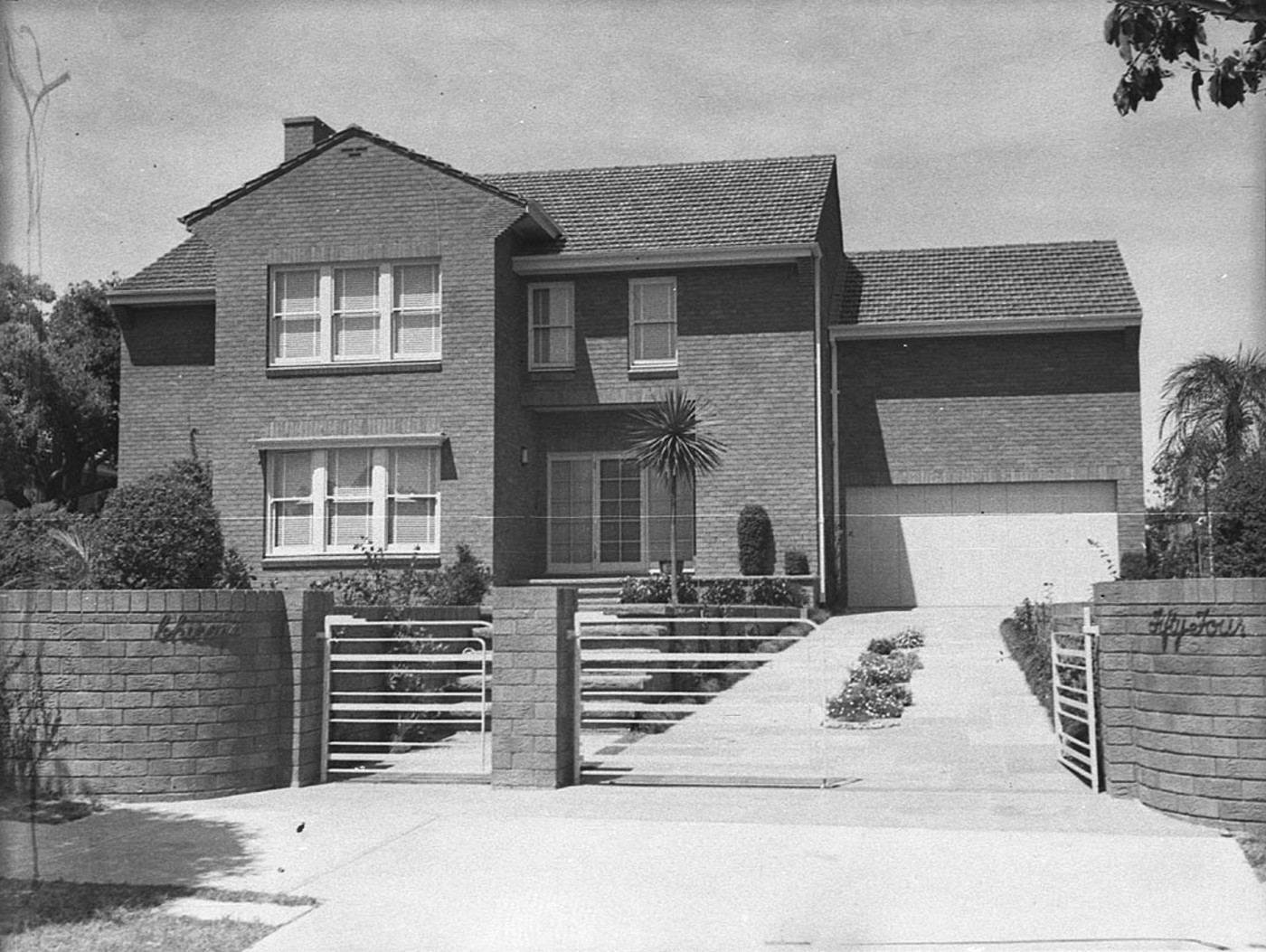
Whittle House built in 1941 to a design by Howard Garnet Alsop (1909–1994)

Strathfield has a long history as a "desirable suburb for Sydney's better classes", especially prior to the building of the Sydney Harbour Bridge allowed residential development to flourish on the North Shore. Although the Inner West region became eclipsed by the Eastern Suburbs and the North Shore as premium residential areas, Strathfield with its boulevardes, large houses and established schools remained a popular suburb for residents. Even in 1977, Strathfield was the most expensive suburb in metropolitan Sydney by median house price.

In December 2021, Strathfield (post code area 2135) was the 13th most expensive area by postcode in Australia, when measured by median house price. Of the top 20 most expensive post code areas (all of which are in metropolitan Sydney), Strathfield was the only one which was located outside the Eastern Suburbs, North Shore or Northern Beaches regions.

Strathfield's residential landscape is extremely varied, ranging from country-style estates to high-rise apartments. Many styles of architecture have been employed over past decades, with dwellings having been constructed in Victorian, Federation, Interwar period architecture, Californian Bungalow and contemporary periods. One of the oldest surviving houses built in the 1870s is Fairholm which is now a retirement village called Strathfield Gardens.

Primarily these have been replaced by modern, multimillion-dollar mansions, although Strathfield has retained its wide avenues and most of the extensive natural vegetation. Streets such as Victoria Street, Llandillo Avenue and Kingsland Road predominantly feature older mansions. Agnes Street, Newton Road and Barker Road are common locations for new homes. In the vicinity of Homebush Road, a number of noted tree-lined avenues follow an oblique street pattern established by the development of the Village of Homebush in the late 19th century, and are noted for the grand, historic houses built in the late 19th and early 20th centursies. These include Albert Road, historically known as one of Sydney's most prestigious streets and was lined by landmark mansions. Some of these have been replaced by institutions and others have been subdivided, but the street retains some of the most prestigious houses in the area.

Redmyre Road, a wide boulevard, retains most of its Victorian mansions and large Federation-era houses. Further to the southeast, a pocket of the suburb bounded by Hunter Street, Carrington Avenue, Homebush Road and the Boulevarde is known in the real estate press as the "Golden Mile", because it contains some of the most desirable and highly sought-after real estate in the area.

Examples of prestigious addresses in this area include homes located on Cotswold Road, Strathfield Avenue, Llandilo Avenue, Agnes and Highgate Street. Decreasing land sizes through subdivision has led to an increase in residential densities, reflecting the outward expansion of Sydney's inner city. A large proportion of Strathfield's population now dwells in apartments with the area immediately surrounding Strathfield railway station dominated by high rise residential towers. Smaller apartment buildings are located in other areas within the suburbs, were mostly built during the 1960s and 1970s.

In the last century a number of grand Strathfield homes became independent school campuses:

- Holyrood – Santa Sabina
- Brunyarra – Santa Maria Del Monte
- Lauriston – Santa Maria Del Monte
- Llandilo – Trinity Grammar School
- Somerset – Trinity Grammar School
- Milverton – Trinity Grammar School
- Riccarton/The Briars – Meriden and partially demolished
- Wariora – Meriden and now demolished
- Lingwood/Branxton – PLC Sydney and now Meriden School
- Selbourne – Meriden and now demolished
- Telerah – Wadham Preparatory School

== Commercial areas ==
Strathfield's commercial town centre is centred on a town square south of the station, and includes the Strathfield Plaza shopping centre which includes Woolworths and other stores, as well as a large number of cafes, restaurants and other stores located around the square and along Albert Road, Churchill Avenue, Redmyre Road and the Boulevarde. Strathfield's town centre is particularly known for a large concentration of Korean restaurants and shops catering to Korean cultural needs. The area is often called Little Korea.

Other commercial areas in the suburb include a small commercial area immediately north of the station, a commercial area along the southern boundary concentrated around the intersection of the Boulevarde and Liverpool Road (part of a town centre around the former Enfield Town Hall). The northern parts of Strathfield are served by the Homebush and Flemington village centres, which were carved out of the suburb of Strathfield after 1947.

There are also some car dealerships and other commercial premises along Parramatta Road and Liverpool Road, on the northern and southern boundaries of the suburb.

== Residents ==
The following were either born or have lived at some time in the suburb of Strathfield:

=== Architecture ===
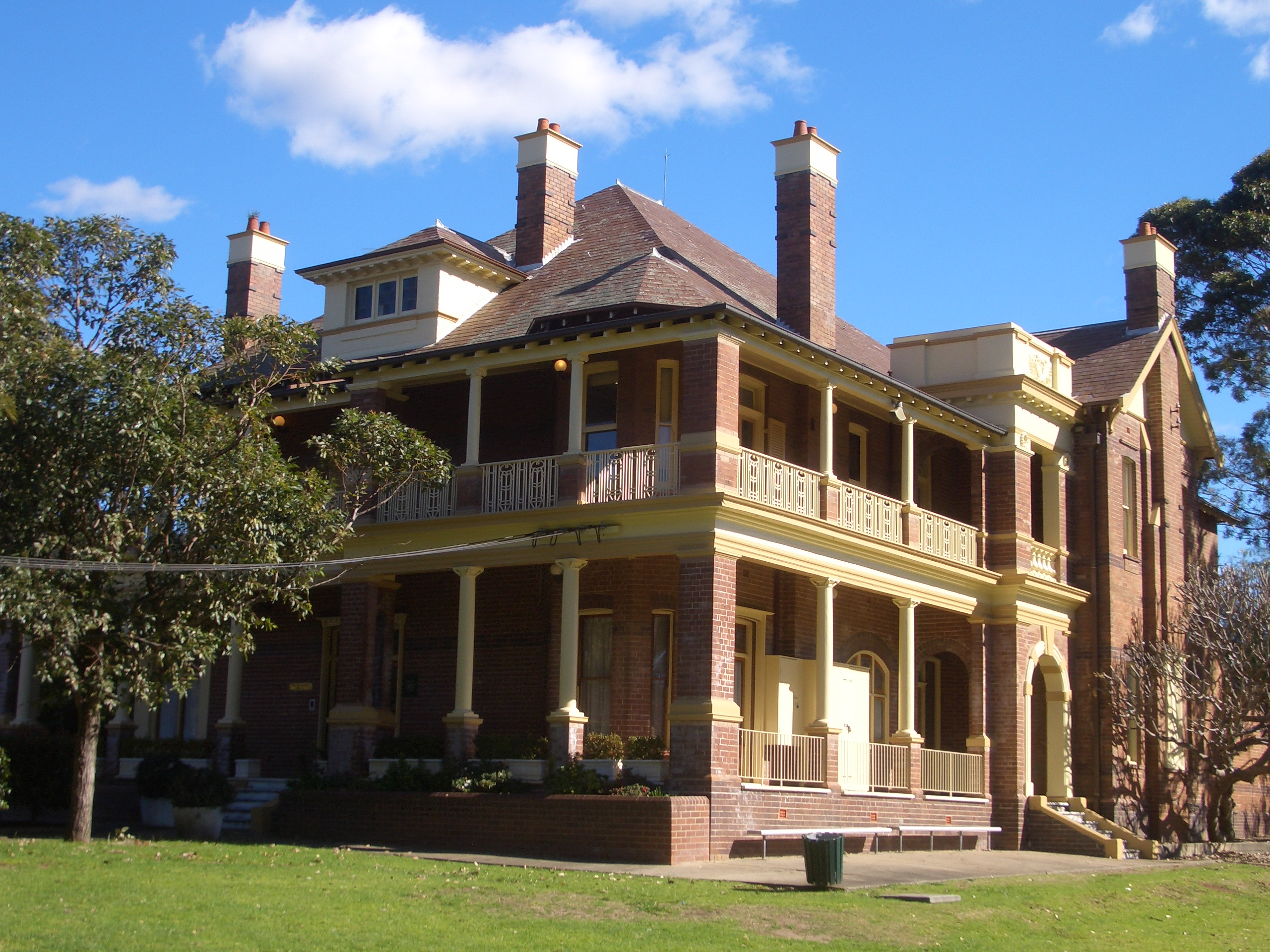
Lauriston designed in 1907 by Alfred Newman

- George Sydney Jones (1864–1927), architect of numerous Strathfield houses and Trinity Congregational Church Strathfield.
- Harry Chambers Kent (1852–1938), architect of numerous Strathfield houses and of Strathfield Town Hall.
- Alfred Gambier Newman (1875–1921), architect of numerous Strathfield houses and of Strathfield Methodist Church.
- Thomas Pollard Sampson (1875–1961), architect of numerous Strathfield houses and of Walls Hall at Meriden School.
- Charles Henry Slatyer (1856–1919), architect of numerous Strathfield houses and a Congregational Church.

==== Business ====
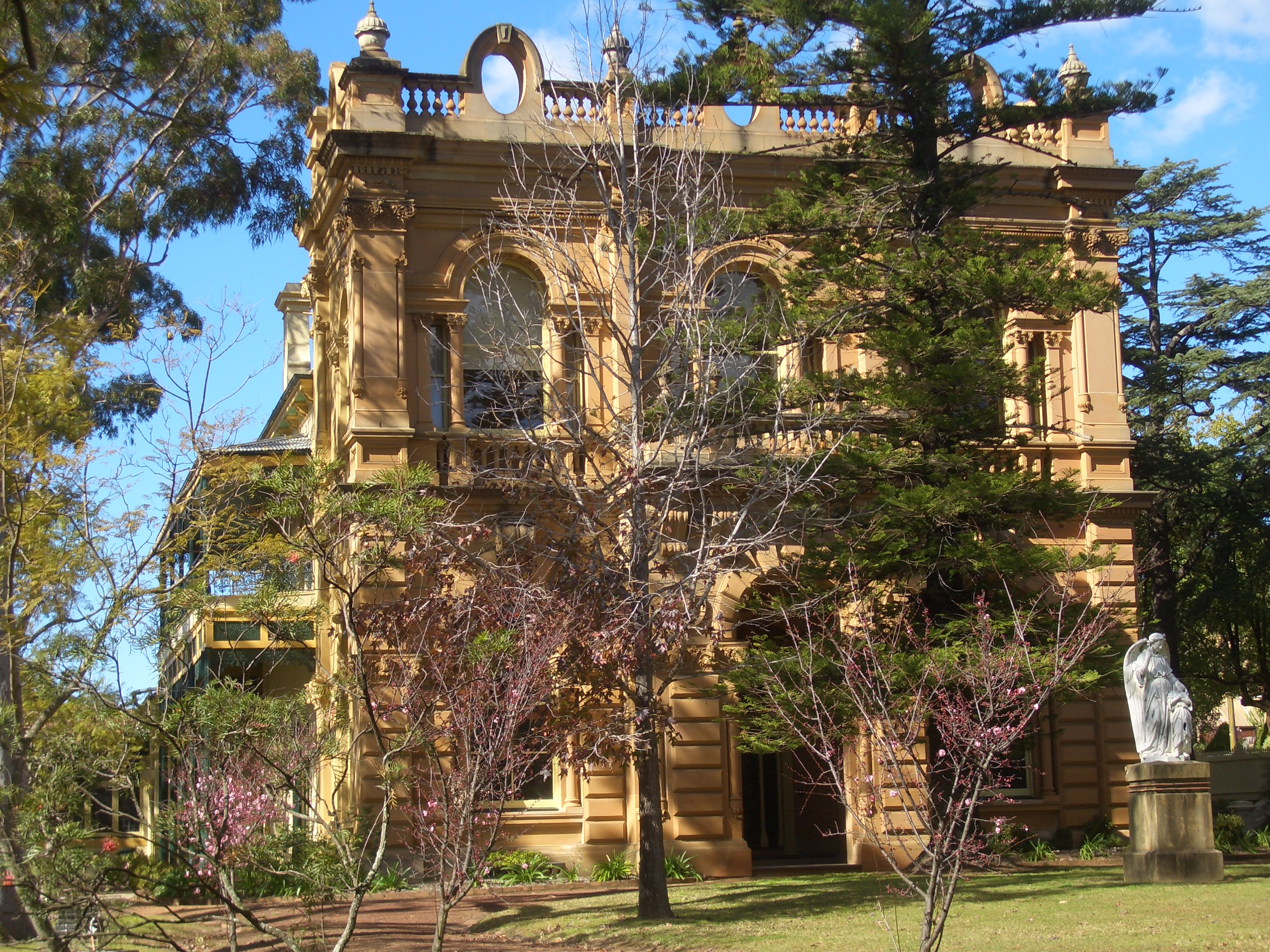
Holyrood designed in 1873 by architect George Allen Mansfield as a Sydney bank and moved to Strathfield in the 1890s as the home of the Hoskins family, is now part of Santa Sabina College

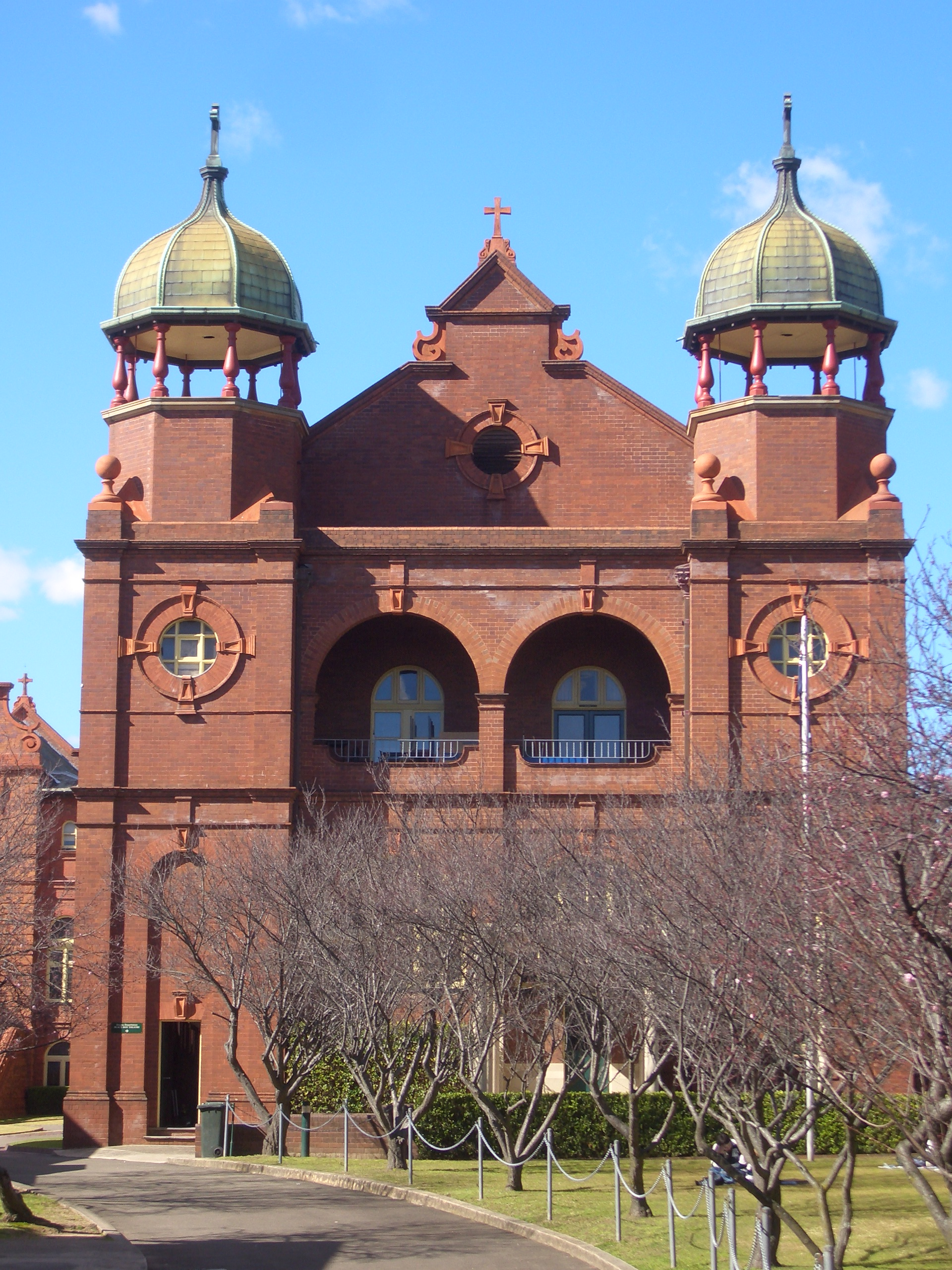
Santa Sabina College on The Boulevarde Strathfield

- William Arnott, founder of Arnott's Biscuits.
- Sir Robert Crichton-Brown (1919–2013), businessman, soldier and sailor, lived in Strathfield in the 1920s and 1930s.
- Alfred John Bush (1879–1951), founder of AJ Bush and Son's Meats, lived in Strathfield from 1925 until his death.
- Charles Henry Hoskins (1851-1926), industrialist and businessman, lived in Strathfield during the 1890s and 1900s.
- Edward Lloyd Jones Snr (1844–1894), head of the department store David Jones, and his son;
- Edward Lloyd Jones Jnr (1874–1934), Shorthorn cattle breeder and former chairman of David Jones Limited, and his brother;
- Charles Lloyd Jones (1878–1958), former chairman of David Jones and former chairman of the Australian Broadcasting Commission and his brother;
- Eric Lloyd Jones (1885–1958), director of David Jones, Wimbledon singles tennis player and Friesian cattle breeder.

=== Education ===
- Brian Rees (1929–2016), Headmaster of Merchant Taylors' School, Northwood, Charterhouse School and Rugby School, was born in Strathfield.

=== Law ===
- David Wilson KC (1879–1965), barrister and company director
- Sir Percy Joske (1895–1981), judge and Queens's Counsel

=== Medicine ===
- Sir Philip Sydney Jones (1836–1918), medical practitioner and University of Sydney vice-chancellor lived at Llandilo on The Boulevarde.

=== Politics ===
- Sir George Reid (1845–1918), 4th Prime Minister of Australia.
- Earl Page (1880–1961), 11th Prime Minister of Australia.
- Frank Forde (1890–1983), 15th Prime Minister of Australia.
- Sonia McMahon (1932–2010), spouse of the 20th Prime Minister of Australia, was born in Strathfield.

=== Religion ===
- Rev Prof Hubert Cunliffe-Jones (1905–1991), was born in Strathfield.

=== Science ===
- F. J. Duarte: author and physicist, lived in Leicester Avenue, Strathfield.

=== Entertainment ===
- Bang Chan, member and leader of the South Korean boy band Stray Kids, lived in Strathfield for some time during his teenage years.

=== Sport ===
- Alan Davidson (1929−2021), cricketer
- Daphne Akhurst (1903–1933), tennis player

=== Other people ===
- Katharine Gatty, suffragette
- Anu Singh, convicted of murdering her boyfriend
- Derek Percy, convicted child killer

== Transport ==
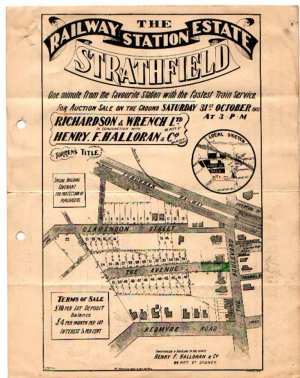
In October 1903 a subdivision of the Redmyre Estate was auctioned. The pamphlet shows it was billed as "The Railway Station Estate, Strathfield".

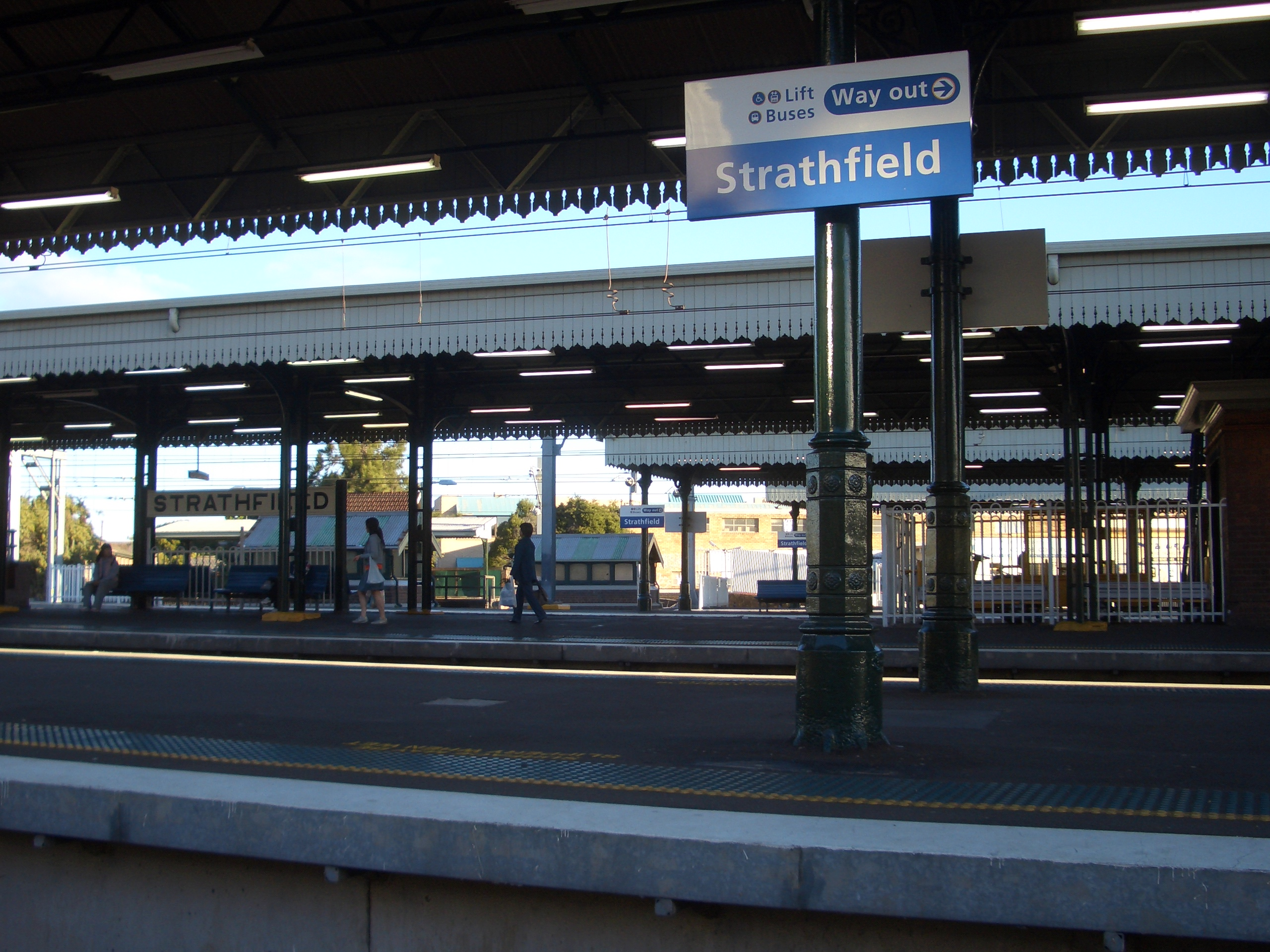
Strathfield railway station

Strathfield railway station is a major interchange on the Sydney Trains and NSW TrainLink networks, and has long been an interchange for several of Sydney's suburban lines, as well as intercity services and interstate services. However, intercity services from Strathfield significantly reduced in 2013. With the upgrading of the East Hills line, trains heading southwest to Canberra and Melbourne began to use that line, leaving only intercity trains to the north and west to continue using Strathfield station. The bus station located on the town square, immediately south of the station, is an interchange for Transit Systems buses serving the Inner West.

In the west, Strathfield is bounded by the A3 arterial road, linking Strathfield with the St George region, where it joins the A1 road (Princes Highway) towards Sutherland Shire and the south coast, while in the north it connects Strathfield with Ryde, Pymble and Gordon, where it intersects with the A1 road again and then proceeds towards the Northern Beaches.

Strathfield is bounded in the north by Parramatta Road and in the south by Liverpool Road, both major arterial roads. Parramatta Road links Strathfield east to the Sydney central business district. Parramatta Road leads to Parramatta, Blacktown, Penrith and beyond. Liverpool Road links Strathfield east to Ashfield, where it joins Parramatta Road, and west to Bankstown, Liverpool, Canberra and Melbourne. The M4 Motorway largely parallels the Great Western Highway but lies outside Strathfield suburb boundaries. The exit at Concord Road in North Strathfield serves Strathfield.

Two local arterial routes serving the Inner West, formed by Concord Road-Raw Square-The Boulevarde (north-south, formerly part of Metroad 3 and State Route 27) and Beresford Road-Albert Road-Redmyre Road-Morwick Street (west-east), join and intersect in central Strathfield in a complex pattern.
