= Norman Gregg =

Australian ophthalmologist (1892–1966)

Sir Norman Gregg MC, FRACS
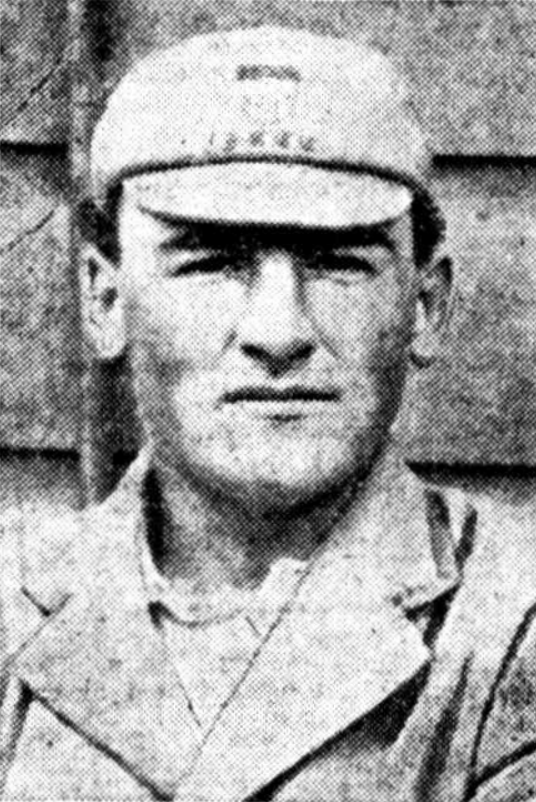
- Gregg in 1912.
- Born: 7 March 1892; Burwood, New South Wales
- Died: 27 July 1966 (aged 74); Woollahra, Sydney, New South Wales, Australia
- Education: University of Sydney
- Known for: Discovery of congenital rubella syndrome
- Awards: Military Cross (1918); James Cook Medal (1951); Knight Bachelor (1953)
- Scientific career
- Fields: Ophthalmology

Sir Norman McAlister Gregg (7 March 1892 – 27 July 1966) was an Australian ophthalmologist, who discovered that rubella suffered by a pregnant woman could cause birth defects in her child (congenital rubella syndrome).

== Early life and education ==
Gregg was born on 7 March 1892 in Burwood, a suburb of Sydney. He was educated at Homebush Grammar School and Sydney Grammar School, and then studied medicine at the University of Sydney, graduating with a Bachelor of Medicine and Surgery and first-class honours in 1915.

During his education, Gregg was an active and capable sportsman, playing cricket, tennis, baseball, swimming and ice hockey at university. From 1913 to 1914, he represented New South Wales in cricket three times, and once in tennis. Had it not been for the outbreak of World War I, Gregg would have qualified for the Australian Davis Cup team.

== Military career ==
After completing his medical degree, Gregg travelled to England, where he was commissioned as a temporary lieutenant in the Royal Army Medical Corps of the British Army on 23 March 1915. He served on the Western Front during World War I attached to the East Yorkshire Regiment's 17th Battalion, and later with the 52nd Field Ambulance. Promoted temporary captain on 23 March 1916, he was an acting major for just over a month in 1919, was wounded in the field, and was awarded the Military Cross for gallantry on 24 September 1918. He left the army on 7 March 1920, retaining the rank of captain.

The citation for his MC read:

T./Capt. Norman McAlister Gregg, M.B., R.A.M.C. For conspicuous gallantry and devotion to duty during a raid. He untiringly attended to the wounded under heavy enemy fire until the last man was cleared, and showed great coolness and devotion to duty. He worked persistently throughout the raid in the open, and searched for any wounded that might have been overlooked. He behaved splendidly.

== Medical career ==
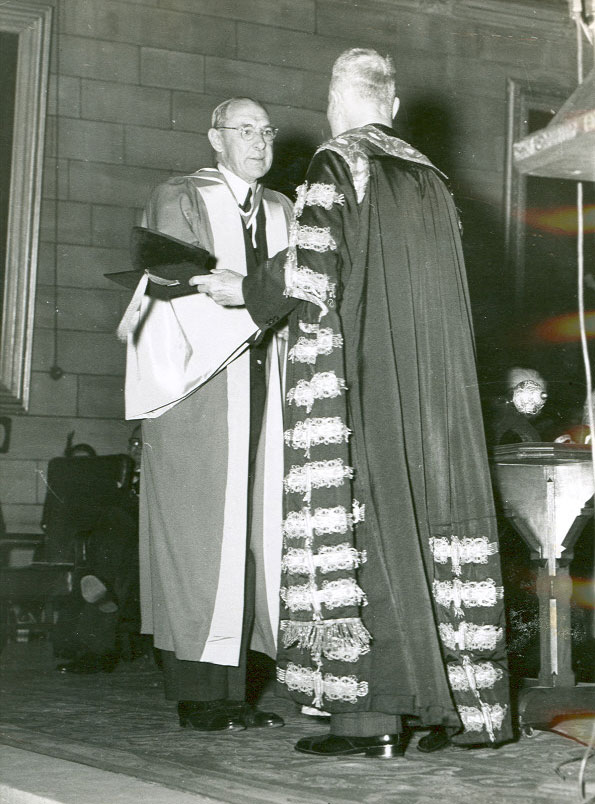
Dr. Gregg (left) receiving an honorary Doctor of Science degree from the University of Sydney in 1952

Returning to Australia, Gregg was appointed resident medical officer at Sydney's Royal Prince Alfred Hospital (RPA). He returned to England to study ophthalmology, gaining a diploma of ophthalmic medicine and surgery after training at Moorfields Eye Hospital and Royal Westminster Ophthalmic Hospital in London, and the Birmingham and Midland Counties Eye Hospital.

Gregg returned to Sydney, where he set up a practice in 1923. That same year he was appointed ophthalmic surgeon at RPA, and the same post at the Royal Alexandra Hospital for Children from 1925. In 1950 he was made a consultant at the Royal Alexandra, and in 1952 at the RPA.

=== Congenital rubella syndrome ===
When World War II began, Gregg was a paediatric ophthalmologist, at a time when most doctors had joined the army and he was one of few eye doctors in Sydney. Gregg noticed a high incidence of congenital cataracts in infants arriving at his surgery – two to three times the normal rate that would be expected from hereditary factors. He overheard a conversation between several mothers whose babies had cataracts, in which they mentioned that they had suffered from German measles (rubella) during pregnancy. Investigating the medical records of children with similar conditions, Gregg discovered that out of 78 affected children, 68 had been exposed to rubella in utero. There had been an outbreak of rubella and meningitis in Australian army camps in 1941, which had been transmitted to the wider community when the men returned to their families.

On 15 October 1941, Gregg delivered a paper, Congenital Cataract following German Measles in the Mother, to the Ophthalmological Society of Australia in Melbourne which published it in its journal, Transactions. Following press coverage of his paper, Gregg was contacted by two mothers who had contracted rubella, and whose children suffered from deafness, and he subsequently issued a further paper detailing Further Observations on Congenital Defects in Infants following Maternal Rubella.

While Gregg's findings were met with praise in Australia, internationally his peers were not so convinced. British medical journal The Lancet wrote that he had failed to adequately prove his case, and it was not until Professor Oliver Lancaster of the University of Sydney proved the association between the rubella virus and congenital syndromes in infants was significant, that his research was accepted around the world.

Gregg was a Fellow of the Royal Australasian College of Surgeons (FRACS).

== Honours ==
- In 1951, he was awarded the James Cook Medal by the Royal Society of New South Wales, for outstanding contribution to science and human welfare in the Southern Hemisphere.
- On 29 August 1952, he received an honorary degree of Doctor of Science from the University of Sydney
- On 1 January 1953, he was made a Knight Bachelor for services to medical science in the New Year Honours. He received the accolade from the Governor-General of Australia at Government House, Canberra on 28 January 1953.
- In 1962, Sir Norman was given the Australian Father of the Year award.
- A lecture theatre at the University of Sydney's School of Public Health, and a suite of operating theatres at the Children's Hospital at Westmead are named after him.

== See also ==
- List of New South Wales representative cricketers
