= Strathfield Gardens =

Building in Sydney, Australia

Coordinates: 33.8855°S 151.0866°E

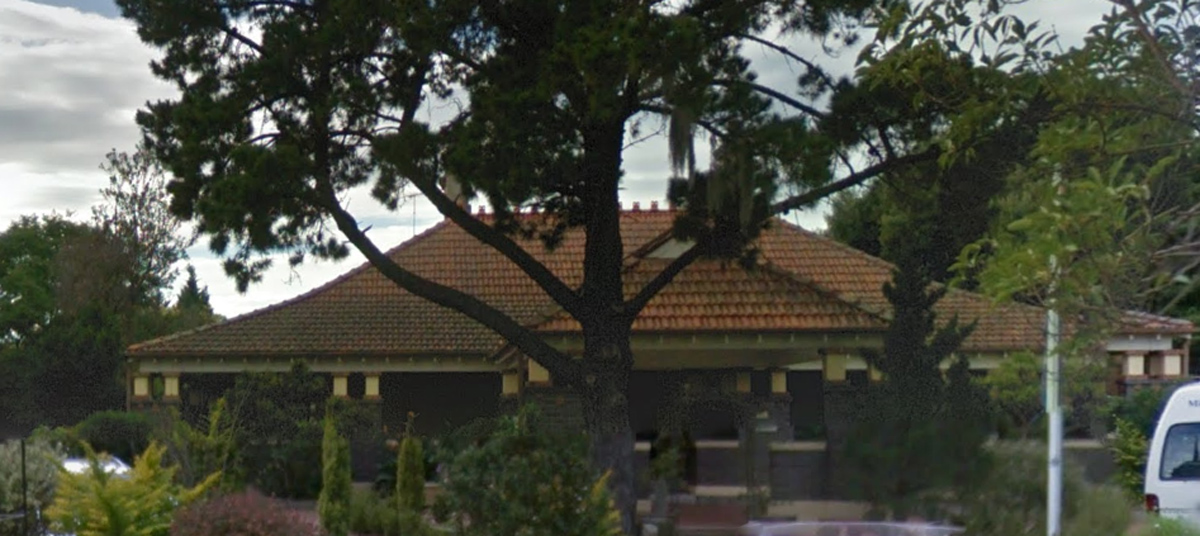
Strathfield Gardens

Strathfield Gardens in Strathfield, New South Wales, Australia, was previously called Fairholm. It is a building of historical significance and is listed in the NSW Heritage Register. It was built in the 1870s, and external additions were made to it in 1890 and 1925. It is the oldest surviving house in Strathfield. The property was for many years a private residence. It is now a retirement village.

== Charles and Agnes Muddle ==
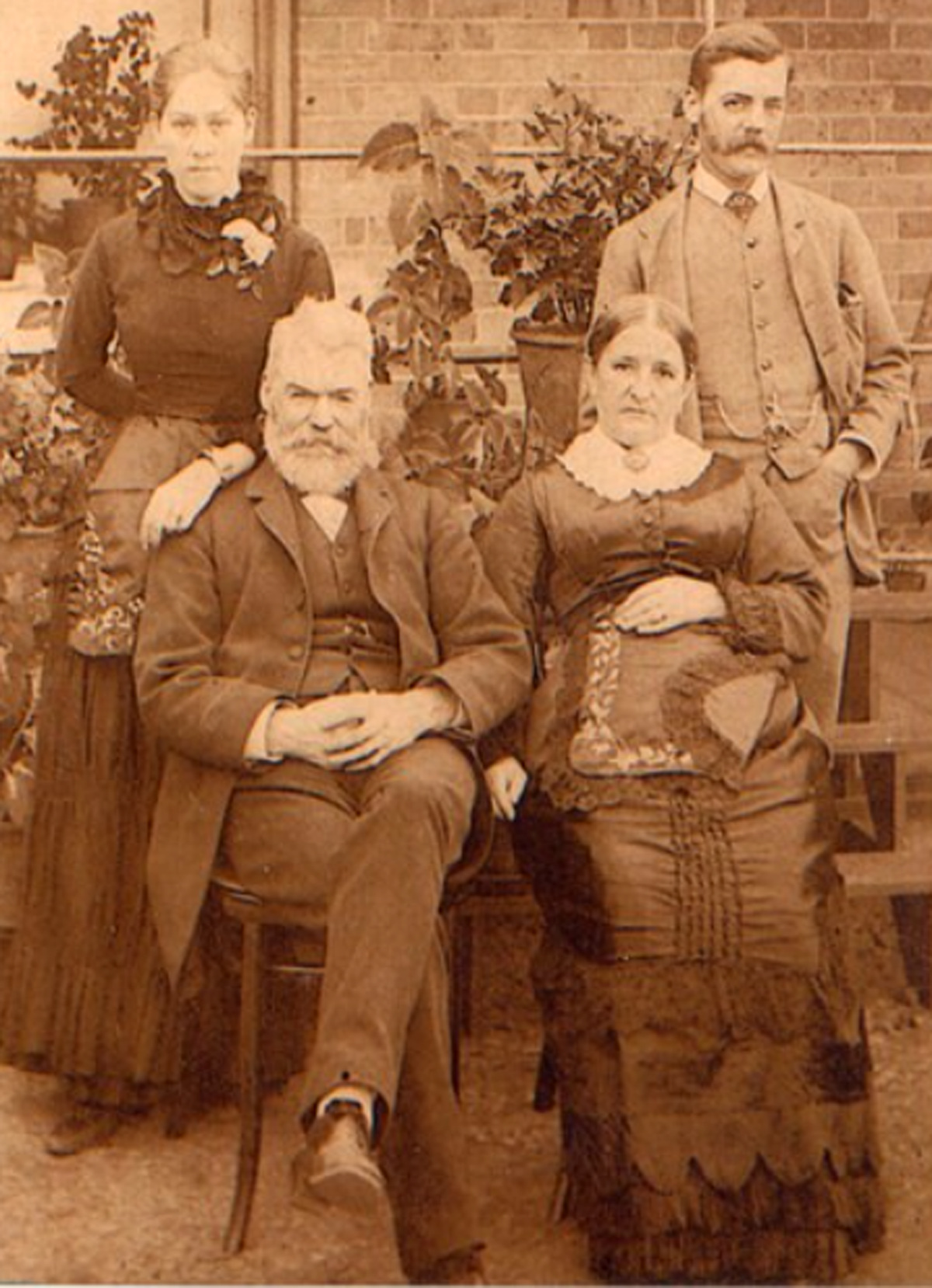
Charles and Agnes Muddle with two of their children c. 1880

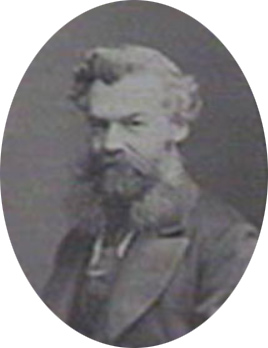
Charles John Muddle c. 1870

Charles John Muddle (1834–1903) built Fairholm about 1878. He was born in 1834 in Kent, England. When he was only 4 years old, his parents, Charles and Elizabeth, decided to immigrate to Australia. They arrived in 1838 on the ship Woodbridge, and his father found work in the Customs Department.

At the age of 20 in 1854, Charles married Agnes Elizabeth Waller at the Presbyterian church in Pitt Street. Agnes was the sister of James Waller, who was an acclaimed vocalist of that time. The couple lived in various inner parts of Sydney for the next 20 years and during that time had ten children. Charles obtained a job in the Colonial Secretary's Office and later was appointed to the Lands Department, where he worked for 28 years. He became the Deputy Registrar General, which was a position of importance in the field of land surveying.

In the 1870s the couple moved to Strathfield and built Fairholm. The family lived in the house for the next 20 years. Agnes died here in 1900, and Charles in 1903.

== Thomas and Ellen Riley ==
Thomas Riley bought Fairholm about 1907 and lived there with his wife Ellen until his death in 1915. Thomas was born in 1859 in Durham, England. He immigrated to Australia at the age of 20 in 1879 and later established the firm of Riley, Newman and Co., who were wool and produce buyers.

In 1888 he married Ellen Lynch, who was from County Kerry in Ireland. The couple had three children. Thomas died in 1915, and in 1919 the Fairholm property was subdivided. The house was advertised for sale in 1920 and was described as follows:

Most comfortable residence brick on stone, wide verandahs all around, 7 large bedrooms, kitchen, bathroom, pantry, maids' room, laundry. Well laid out garden, tennis lawn.

== Residents after 1920 ==
Thomas Albert Derrick (1875–1962) and his wife Gabrielle were residents of Fairholm from about 1925 until 1935. Thomas was a farmer from Temora and returned there after spending some time in Strathfield. In the 1940s Frederick Vass Teasdale (1889–1949) and his wife Ada lived in the house. Frederick was the headmaster of Naremburn High School.
