= Strathfield rail underbridges =

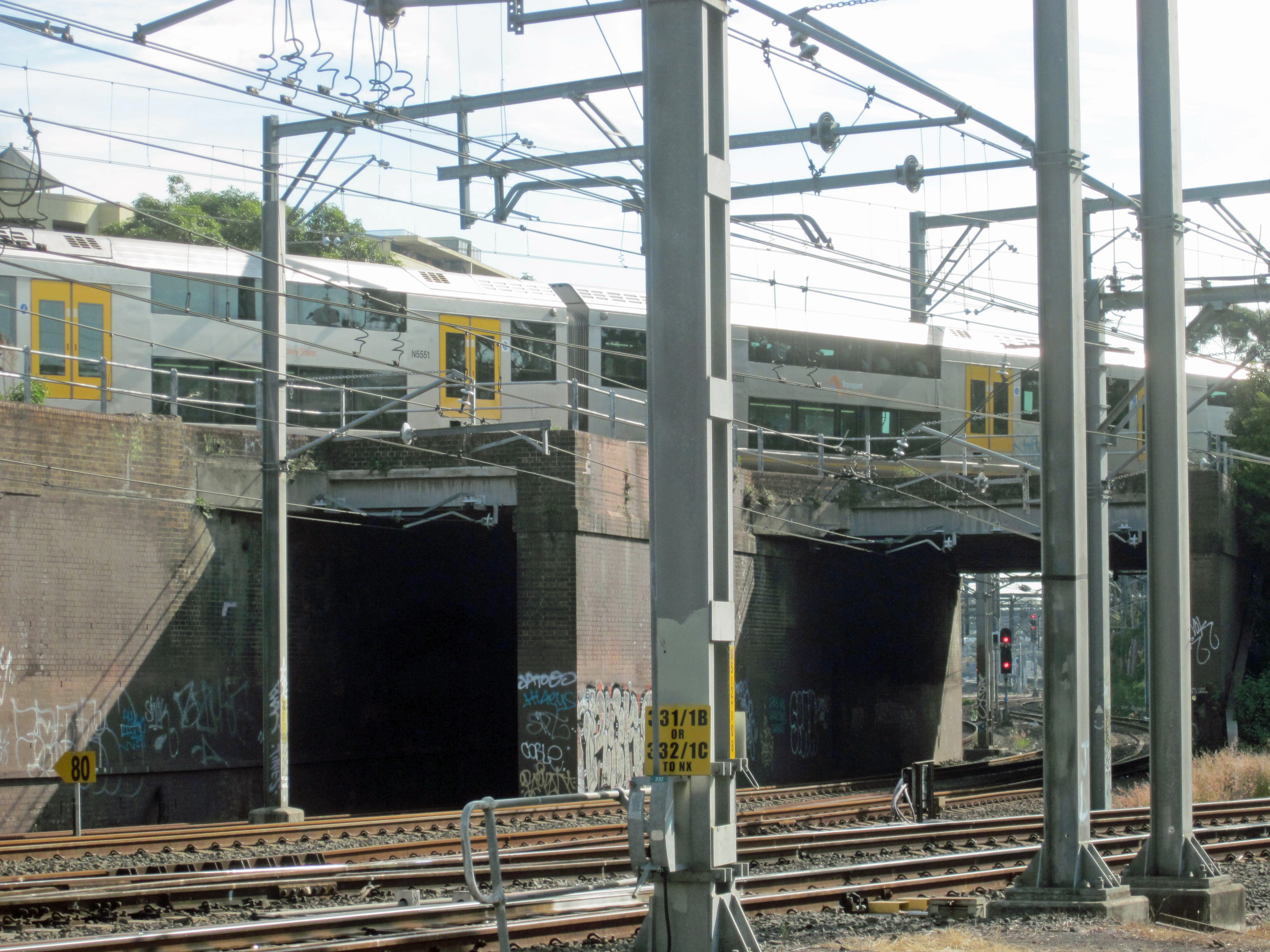
- Strathfield rail underbridges showing train passing overhead
- Coordinates: 33°52′12″S 151°05′31″E
- Carries: Main North line
- Crosses: Main Southern line; Main Western line
- Locale: Strathfield, New South Wales, Australia=
- Official name: Strathfield Flyover; Strathfield rail underbridges (flyover)
- Owner: Transport Asset Manager of New South Wales

Characteristics
- Design: Overpass
- Material: Brick

New South Wales Heritage Register
- Official name: Strathfield rail underbridges (flyover); Strathfield Flyover
- Type: State heritage (built)
- Designated: 2 April 1999
- Reference no.: 1055
- Type: Railway Bridge/Viaduct
- Category: Transport – Rail

Location
- Interactive map of Strathfield rail underbridges

The Strathfield rail underbridges are heritage-listed railway bridges located on the Main Southern and Main Western railway lines, in Strathfield, New South Wales, Australia. The underbridges are also known as Strathfield rail underbridges (flyover) and Strathfield Flyover. The property is owned by the Transport Asset Manager of New South Wales. It was added to the New South Wales State Heritage Register on 2 April 1999.

The underbridges can be viewed from Cooper Street, near its intersection with Leicester Avenue, Strathfield.

== History ==
As part of the electrification of the Sydney network, Strathfield railway station was rebuilt, opening on 7 March 1927. This included an overpass to take the Main Northern line over the Main Suburban line.

== Heritage listing ==
As at 23 June 2016, the flyover is a rare item in NSW, built of brick to take the northern line suburban electric trains over the other tracks to avoid conflicts of traffic movement. The underbridge is a major structure at a busy intersection and is a good example of this type of structure.

The Strathfield rail underbridges were listed on the New South Wales State Heritage Register on 2 April 1999 having satisfied the following criteria. The place possesses uncommon, rare or endangered aspects of the cultural or natural history of New South Wales.

This item is assessed as historically rare. This item is assessed as archaeologically rare. This item is assessed as socially rare.
