= Trinity Uniting Church, Strathfield =

Trinity Uniting Church
- Trinity Congregational Church
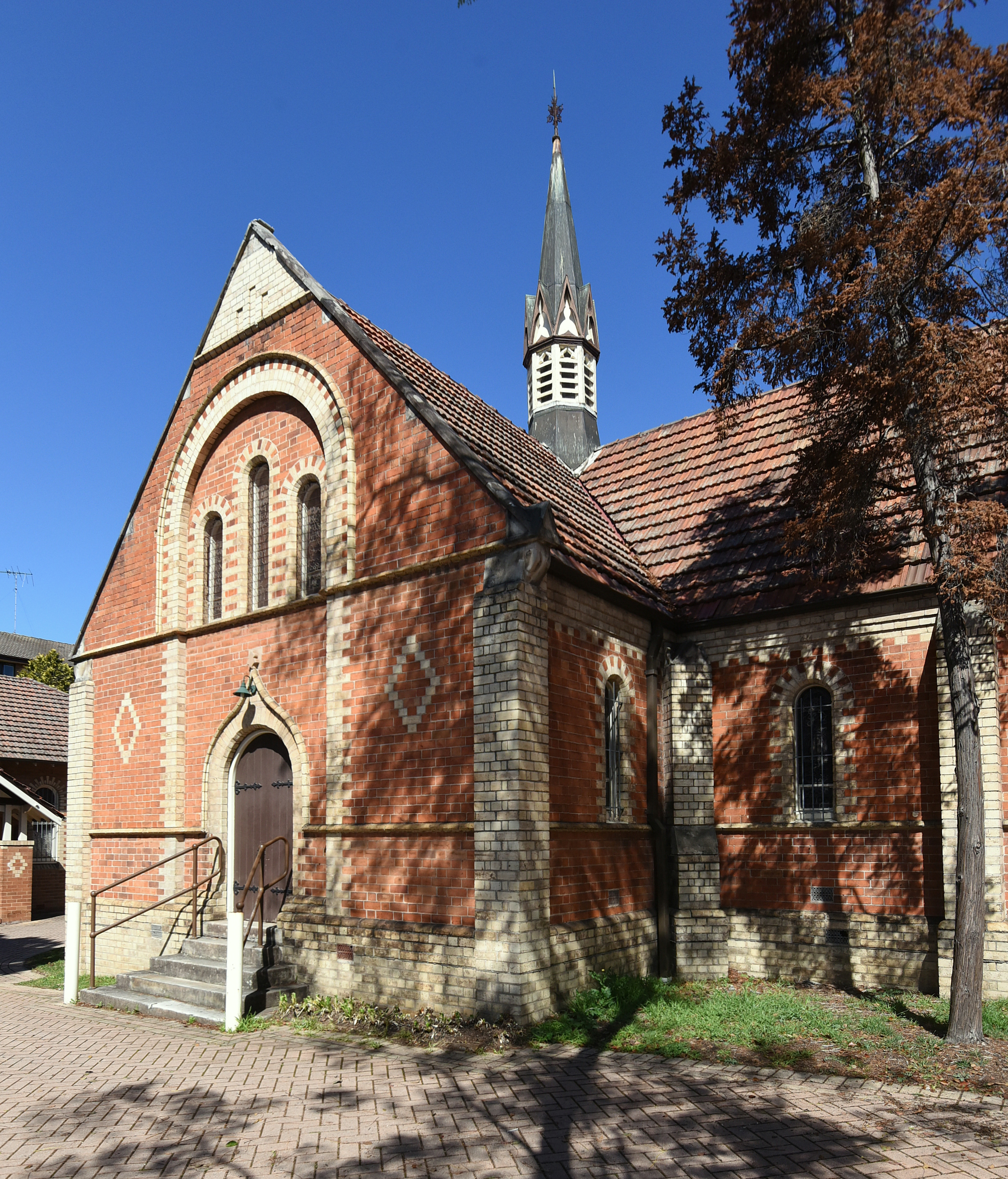
- Trinity Uniting Church, pictured in 2018.

- Location in greater metropolitan Sydney
- 33°52′30″S 151°05′39″E
- Location: 62 The Boulevarde, Strathfield, New South Wales
- Country: Australia
- Denomination: Uniting Church in Australia
- Previous denomination: Congregational Union of Australia
- Website: strathfieldhomebush.unitingchurch.org.au

History
- Status: Church

Architecture
- Functional status: Active
- Architect(s): George Sydney Jones & Harry Thompson
- Architectural type: Victorian Romanesque
- Years built: 1889–1890

New South Wales Heritage Register
- Official name: Trinity Uniting Church; Trinity Congregational Church
- Type: State heritage (built)
- Designated: 19 September 2003
- Reference no.: 1671
- Type: Church
- Category: Religion
- Builders: Thomas Hanley of Balmain

The Trinity Uniting Church is a heritage-listed Uniting church located at 62 The Boulevarde, in the Sydney suburb of Strathfield in the Municipality of Burwood local government area of New South Wales, Australia. It was designed by George Sydney Jones & Harry Thompson and built from 1889 to 1890 by Thomas Hanley of Balmain. It is also known as Trinity Congregational Church. The property is owned by the Uniting Church in Australia. It was added to the New South Wales State Heritage Register on 19 September 2003.

== History ==
Trinity Church was formed from a split within the congregation of the Congregational Church in Burwood which itself had begun from an inter-denominational fellowship which met in a small weatherboard building on the Parramatta Road from 1861. Of the original church of 1866 only part of the Sunday School remains as it was burnt down in 1874. It was replaced by a stone church in 1880.

There was a group at the Burwood church who became disenchanted with the set-up there and so, on Sunday 5 May 1889 a number of church members, together with the Rev George Littlemore, Burwood's former pastor, met for worship in the Burwood School of Arts. Subsequently 48 people enrolled in the congregation of Trinity Church. However, two of the secessionists were wealthy men, Dr Philip Sydney Jones and the tobacco merchant George Todman, who could not agree on a site for a new church, so they built one each. Thus Strathfield came to acquire two Congregational Churches at the same time - Trinity and Strathfield.

Land for the new Trinity Church was either purchased or otherwise acquired on the corner of The Boulevarde and Morwick Street reputedly by the generosity of Dr P Sydney Jones (later Sir Philip Sydney Jones of Llandilo, Strathfield). Sir Phillip's younger brother, George, and brother-in-law, Harry Thomson, were the joint architects. George had served for a period in the offices of John Horbury Hunt. The level of detailing in the brickwork of the church may have been influenced by Hunt, but the overall design is much more Victorian in style. The Foundation Stone was laid on 2 November 1889 and the Dedication Ceremony on 26 January 1890. The builder was Thomas Hanley of Balmain and the cost of the new church was A£1,449.

Gifts given to the church included a set of pulpit robes and communion plate given by the ladies of the congregation. The carpets and draperies were given by Edward Jones, brother of Sir Phillip, whose father was David Jones of David Jones department store fame. The Norman and Beard (London) organ given by the Thompson family (J D & H D) bought in England during a visit there by JD in 1909.

The Congregation continued to grow and was served by a succession of able Ministers up until 1962 when, due to declining numbers, the congregation was no longer able to support its own Minister. A joint arrangement was made with Summer Hill. When Summer Hill Church closed Trinity became part of the Mid-Western Suburbs Group of Trinity, Strathfield-Homebush, Concord and Croydon. In 1977 this group became part of the Uniting Church of Australia.

== Description ==
=== Church ===
Victorian Romanesque church built in polychrome brick, red with blond patterning on the exterior, and the reverse, blond with red detailing on the interior. The cruciform plan of the church is extended vertically through the spirelet over the crossing. The church is oriented east-west, with the main entry at the western end through an attached porch (exonarthex). A secondary entrance is through the north transept. Small dark stained timber vestibules with stained glass doors provide protected entry on the inside of the church.

The building is elaborately decorated both externally and internally. Contrasting brickwork is used for attached pilasters, buttresses, quoining around window and door openings, string courses and coloureds bands of brickwork, and diamond panels in the facework. Contrasting moulded bricks are used for string courses, sills and hood moulds. Generally, windows and doors have semicircular heads. Ogee hood moulds appear over the two entries to the church. The main roof is currently terra cotta Marseilles pattern tiles, but may have originally been slate. The roof over the vestry is colorbond. Roof over the western entrance porch is painted corrugated gal steel. The spire is octagonal, of timber construction, with louvred vents and clad in sheet metal (copper or zinc).

The floor is timber, sloping down from the west door toward the crossing, with a carpet down the aisle. The floor is flat through the transepts. The chancel/sanctuary is on a raised platform, carpeted. The walls of the nave and transepts have a rendered dado (recent) with a timber dado rail. The dado to the sanctuary and the south transept has velvet curtains hanging in front of white lime washed brickwork. The ceiling is diagonally boarded with exposed trusses and purlins, and triangular ceiling vents. The structure of the spire is supported by the four roof trusses over the crossing, and is open through the ceiling for light and ventilation.

Internally, the emphasis is on the crossing, with the pews arranged around the centre. The pews are original with bench seats and shaped slatted backs. Fold down seats exist on the ends of some pews. The pulpit and lectern and other sanctuary furniture appear to be original. A pipe organ occupies the south transept. It retains its original hand pump handle to the bellows. The church contains a fine collection of leadlight windows, featuring floral themes, and memorials. The building also retains its original gas light fittings.

=== Hall ===
The hall has been built in several stages, with each stage being designed to complement the church. Generally, the building is of polychrome brickwork, red with blond trim, with a terra cotta Marseilles pattern tiled roof, hipped in form with skillion additions. A gabled entrance porch has been added to the west elevation. Windows are double hung with semicircular heads and contrasting brick quoins and sills.

Internally, the floor is timber, except the toilet addition, which is concrete. The walls are rendered with a dado line run in the render. The ceiling is of battened sheets. A large stage exists at the northern end of the hall, but has been partitioned off and converted to offices. The original steps and doors to the wings still exist, as does one wing wall (stud frame lined one side only). When the addition was made to the north-west corner of the building the original window to the hall was relocated to the north wall of the addition.

=== Condition ===
As at 30 May 2003, the church is generally good. Evidence of falling damp and salt attack in the north-east corner of the vestry. Recent works have been carried out to the roof drainage over this area. The rendering of the dado inside the church may be due to rising damp. This should be investigated. Timberwork to spire is in need of painting. Hall: Generally good.

The church has a very high degree of integrity.

=== Modifications and dates ===
- 1909 - organ purchased
- 1932 - Hall built
- 1940s? - Low wall and gates built to street boundaries
- 1961 - Office addition to south-west corner of hall
- c. 1990s - Toilet addition to eastern end of hall.

=== Further information ===
The group of buildings is very cohesive in design, with the hall adopting the polychrome detailing of the church, but with the church remaining the dominant building on the site in both scale, location and level of detail.

The church and hall are no longer used by a congregation of the Uniting Church of Australia for regular Sunday worship, but the Strathfield-Homebush parish uses one room as its central church office, and occasionally uses the church for special services. The church is leased to 3 other congregations for worship services, and the hall is leased for the offices of other religious organisations and for community use.

== Heritage listing ==
As at 30 May 2003, Trinity Uniting Church constructed in 1889 is an exceptionally fine and intact example of Victorian Romanesque design, with excellent polychrome brickwork detailing, both externally and internally. The cruciform plan of the church is extended vertically through the spirelet over the crossing. The church contains a fine collection of leadlight windows, original furnishings, original gas light fittings and a pipe organ (1909) by the London firm of Norman and Beard. The intactness and exceptional aesthetic significance of this place make it State significant. The church is associated with the Jones family, prominent and wealthy members of the Sydney community - Sir Philip Sydney Jones and his brother Edward Jones, whose father was David Jones of department store fame, contributed financially to the establishment of the church. Sir Phillip's younger brother, George, and brother-in-law, Harry P Thomson, were the joint architects.

Trinity Uniting Church was listed on the New South Wales State Heritage Register on 19 September 2003 having satisfied the following criteria.

The place is important in demonstrating the course, or pattern, of cultural or natural history in New South Wales.

The place was built following a split within the congregation of the Congregational Church of Burwood in 1889. A second splinter group from the same church at the same time built the Strathfield Congregational Church. These two congregations were reunited in 1977 under the Uniting Church of Australia.

The place has a strong or special association with a person, or group of persons, of importance of cultural or natural history of New South Wales's history.

The church is associated with the Jones family, prominent and wealthy members of the Sydney community - Sir Philip Sydney Jones and his brother Edward Jones, whose father was David Jones of department store fame, contributed financially to the establishment of the church. Sir Phillip's younger brother, George, and brother-in-law, Harry P Thomson, were the joint architects.

The place is important in demonstrating aesthetic characteristics and/or a high degree of creative or technical achievement in New South Wales.

The church is an exceptionally fine and intact example of Victorian Romanesque design, with excellent polychrome brickwork detailing, both externally and internally. The cruciform plan of the church is extended vertically through the spirelet over the crossing. The church contains a fine collection of leadlight windows, original furnishings, original gas light fittings and a pipe organ by the London firm of Norman and Beard.

The place has a strong or special association with a particular community or cultural group in New South Wales for social, cultural or spiritual reasons.

The place is significant as a place of worship to the several congregations that use it. With the formation of the Uniting Church of Australia in 1977, the former Trinity congregation moved to Strathfield Uniting Church, leasing Trinity to several young congregations, representing the various cultural groups within the Strathfield area. Strathfield-Homebush Uniting Church Parish maintains a continuing presence using and office daily and the church occasionally. The hall provides facilities for community use.

The place possesses uncommon, rare or endangered aspects of the cultural or natural history of New South Wales.

Trinity Uniting Church is a rare example of an elaborate Victorian Romanesque suburban church featuring polychrome brick detailing externally, with the reverse colour way expressed internally. The detailing throughout is of a very high standard.

The place is important in demonstrating the principal characteristics of a class of cultural or natural places/environments in New South Wales.

It is representative of the rapid expansion of the churches during the second half of the nineteenth century and of the money spent on new church buildings by wealthy and powerful families during the Victorian era.

== See also ==
- Uniting Church in Australia
- Congregational Union of Australia
- Australian non-residential architectural styles
