= Charles Lloyd Jones =

Australian businessman and patron of the arts

Sir Charles Lloyd Jones
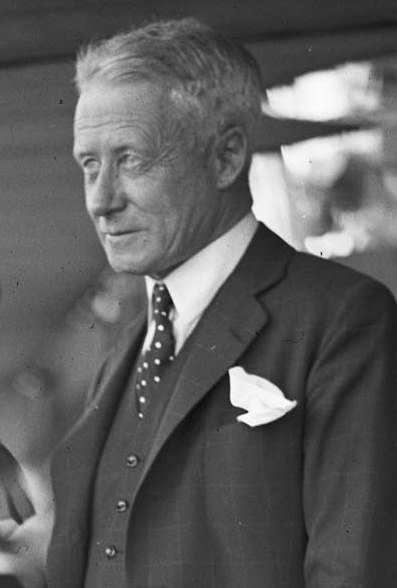
- Jones on board HNLMS Java in Sydney, October 1930.
- Born: 28 May 1878; Burwood, New South Wales, Australia
- Died: 30 July 1958 (aged 80); Woollahra, New South Wales, Australia
- Occupations: Artist; Businessman; Patron of the Arts
- Title: Chairman of David Jones (1920–58)
- Spouse(s): Winifred Quaife (m.1900–d.1916); Louise Multras (m. 1917–1925); Hannah Jones (m. 1925–d.1982)
- Children: 3

Sir Charles Lloyd Jones (28 May 1878 – 30 July 1958) was an Australian businessman and patron of the arts, serving as Chairman of David Jones from 1920 to his death in 1958.

== Early life and background ==
Jones was born in 1878 in Burwood, New South Wales, to Edward Lloyd Jones and Helen Ann Jones, and was the grandson of the Welsh-born merchant David Jones. After attending the Manor House School, in London, and Homebush Grammar School, Jones studied from 1895 at the Julian Ashton Art School in Sydney and then the Slade School of Fine Art in London, England, but ultimately was unable to fulfil his ambition of becoming a professional artist. He later trained as a tailor and worked in that profession for several years in England before returning to Australia in 1902. On 16 November 1900 when visiting Sydney he married his first wife, Winifred Ethelwyn Quaife, the daughter of Barzillai Quaife (1798–1873), a Congregational and Presbyterian minister, but they had no children.

== Career and David Jones ==
After he returned to Sydney in 1902, Jones worked in the family company David Jones, in the clothing factory before transferring to the advertising department. When David Jones Ltd became a listed as a public company in 1906, he was appointed as a director. In 1920 he succeeded his elder brother, Edward Lloyd Jones, as chairman, a position he would hold until his death in 1958. During his term, David Jones expanded significantly, opening a second major store in Elizabeth Street in 1927 and later a third on the corner of Market and Castlereagh Streets in 1938 to mark the centenary of the company.

As both an artist himself and a patron of the arts in Sydney, Jones established the David Jones Art Gallery in the Elizabeth Street store in 1944, under the direction of Sir John Ashton. The Sir Charles Lloyd Jones Memorial Prize was named in his honour. A promoter of Sydney artists and in particular the work of William Dobell, Dobell painted Jones' portrait in 1951, which is now held in the National Portrait Gallery, Canberra. In a note to his sons regarding the family company he said: "David Jones is more than a material money-making concern, it is a great institution rendering a service to countless millions in the year, in fair dealing with the desire to serve all who enter its doors honestly, setting a new standard in commercial practice."

He was also publisher of Art in Australia. He was the inaugural Chairman of the Australian Broadcasting Commission 1932–34 and acting chairman of the Australian National Travel Association when in 1934 it launched Walkabout magazine. He was made a Knight Bachelor in the 1951 New Year's Honours.

== Honours ==
- King George V Silver Jubilee Medal, 1935.
- King George VI Coronation Medal, 1937.
- Knight Bachelor, 1951 New Year Honours.
- Queen Elizabeth II Coronation Medal, 1953.

=== Arms ===
Coat of arms of Sir Charles Lloyd Jones

Adopted
Granted by the Kings of Arms, 6 April 1954.
Crest
In front of two Anchors in saltire Or, a Dragon's head erased Sable.
Escutcheon
Or, in chief a Dragon passant and in base an Anchor Sable between two Flaunches Azure, each charged with three Fleurs-de-lys palewise Gold.
Motto
Latin: Tempore Sapienter Utimini (Wisdom Takes Time)
Symbolism
The Dragons are symbolic of the Welsh heritage of the Jones family.

== Notes ==
Business positions
Preceded by Edward Lloyd Jones	Chairman of David Jones; 1920 – 1958	Succeeded by David Lloyd Jones
Media offices
New title	Chairman of the Australian Broadcasting Commission; 1932 – 1934	Succeeded by William James Cleary
