= Philip Sydney Jones =

Australian surgeon (1836–1918)

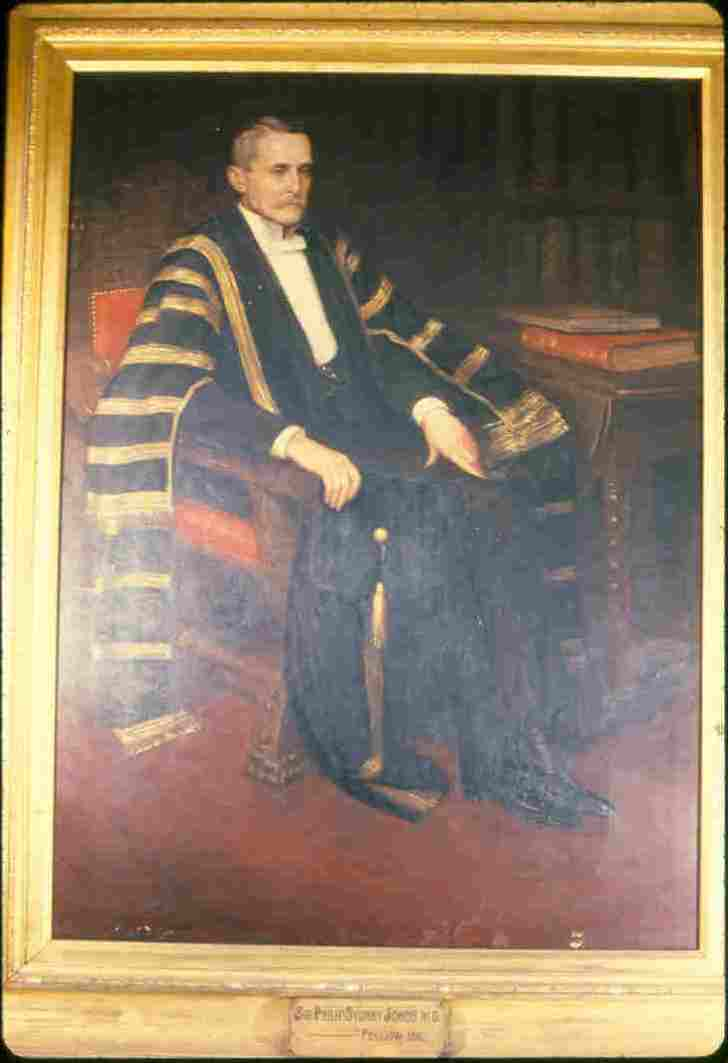
Jones as Vice-Chancellor of the University of Sydney. (Percy Spence, 1895)

Sir Philip Sydney Jones (15 April 1836 – 18 September 1918) was an Australian medical practitioner and University of Sydney vice-chancellor 1904–1906. He was knighted in 1905 for his services to the treatment of tuberculosis. He carried out the first reported successful oophorectomy at Sydney Infirmary in 1870.

== Early life ==
Sydney Jones was born in Sydney, the second son of David Jones, a Welsh immigrant who founded the department store David Jones in 1838, and his second wife Jane Hall, née Mander. Jones was educated at private schools under William Timothy Cape, T. S. Dodds (in Surry Hills) and Henry Cary (in Darling Point).

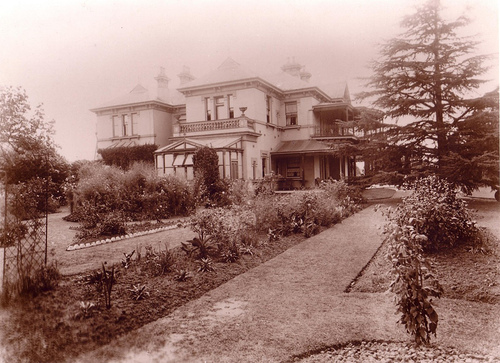
Philip Sydney Jones home, Llandilo, Strathfield c.1930

== Residence ==
In 1878, Jones built "Llandilo" on a large property in Strathfield bounded by The Boulevarde, Albyn Road, Kingsland Road and Wakeford Road and lived there until his death.

The property was then subdivided and a group of residents headed by Rev Wheaton, a Congregational minister, bought the house for a school, which was known as Strathfield Grammar School.

In 1926, the school became part of Trinity Grammar School and today is the landmark building of the Preparatory School campus.

== Community activities ==
He was a member of council of Camden College, the Congregational theological college and grammar school. Jones was knighted in 1905 for his work in combating tuberculosis and died in Sydney, survived by three sons and four daughters. Jones was buried in the Congregational section of Rookwood Cemetery.
