= David Jones (merchant) =

Welsh-Australian merchant (1793–1873)

The Honourable David Jones
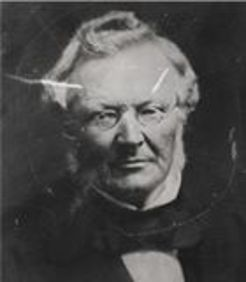
- David Jones

Member of the Legislative Council of New South Wales
- In office 22 May 1856 – 29 March 1860

Alderman of the Sydney City Council
- In office 1 November 1842 – 31 October 1844

Personal details
- Born: 8 March 1793 Llandeilo, Carmarthenshire, Wales, Great Britain
- Died: 29 March 1873 (aged 80) Sydney, Colony of New South Wales
- Spouse(s): Catherine Hughes (m.1813-d.1814); Elizabeth Williams (m.1822-d.1826); Jane Mander (m.1828-d.1873)

David Jones (8 March 1793 – 29 March 1873), was a Welsh-Australian merchant, politician, and the founder of David Jones.

== Early years and background ==
Jones was born in 1793, the son of Thomas Jones, a farmer near Llandeilo, Wales, and his wife Nancy. He became an apprenticed to a grocer in Carmarthen at a young age and his business talent lead to him being offered, at the age of 18, the management of a general store in Eglwyswrw, Pembrokeshire. He later found employment with the firm of R. N. Nicholls, Wood Street, Cheapside in London. On 7 February 1828, he married Jane Mander at St Andrew's Church, Holborn. Jane was the daughter of John Mander of East Smithfield.

== David Jones and Co. ==
He migrated with his family to Hobart in Tasmania in October 1834 on board the Thomas Harrison. He subsequently went into partnership with Charles Appleton 1835 (a merchant who had opened a store in Sydney in 1825) forming the firm 'Appleton & Jones'. The partnership was dissolved in 1838 when he established 'David Jones & Co', at 463 George Street, thereby establishing one of the oldest surviving department stores in the world. In 1849 Jones leased the 'Jerusalem Warehouse' on the corner of Barrack and George streets and converted it into a two-storey shop. This would be the main location of David Jones until the opening of the Elizabeth Street store in 1928.

Now a successful citizen of the colony, Jones invested in various other business interests, including as founding Director of Australian Mutual Provident Society in 1848. He was also a founder of Camden College, and was very involved in Pitt Street (now Pitt Street Uniting), the local Congregational Church. Jones was elected to the first Sydney City Council in 1842, serving only two years, and was later appointed to the New South Wales Legislative Council in May 1856, serving until March 1860.

== Later life ==
With the success of his business, Jones retired from active management in 1856. However he later returned to save it from bankruptcy, thereafter serving until ultimate retirement in 1868. Jones had four sons and four daughters. The eldest son David Mander Jones went on in May 1853 to purchase with his brother, third son George Hall Jones, the large cattle property Boonara station near Kingaroy in the South Burnett. The second son of David Jones was Philip Sydney Jones (1836–1918), who gained eminence as a physician and was subsequently knighted. The youngest son, Edward Lloyd Jones (1844–1894), subsequently succeeded his father in the management of David Jones. Jones died at his home in Lyons Terrace, Liverpool Street, Sydney, on 29 March 1873. He was buried in Rookwood Cemetery. His wife died three weeks later, aged 71.

Business positions
New title	Chairman of David Jones; 1838 – 1868	Succeeded by Edward Lloyd Jones
