= Steven Kaplan (investor) =

American businessman

Steve Kaplan
- Education: New York University (JD)
- Known for: Co-founder of Oaktree Capital Management and Minority owner of Memphis Grizzlies

Stephen Kaplan is an American businessman and co-founder of Oaktree Capital Management, a minority owner of the NBA's Memphis Grizzlies, and former co-owner of Welsh football club Swansea City.

== Biography ==
Kaplan was born to a Jewish family. He graduated with a J.D. from New York University School of Law. He and Howard Marks, Bruce Karsh, Larry Keele, Richard Masson, and Sheldon Stone co-founded Oaktree Capital Management.

In 2012, Kaplan purchased a minority stake in the NBA's Memphis Grizzlies as part of a group led by Robert Pera along with Daniel E. Straus as a minority investor.

Kaplan became co-owner of English Premier League Welsh football club Swansea City alongside Jason Levien in July 2016. The club was relegated at the end of the 2017–18 season. In November 2024 it was announced that Levien along with Steve Kaplan were selling their shares within the club.

Kaplan is also the Co-Chairman of DC United a soccer club he invested in in 2018 and is a member of the MLS Board of Governors.
