= Marc Stern =

American businessman

- Born: Vineland, New Jersey, U.S.
- Education: Dickinson College (BA); Columbia University (JD)
- Occupations: Business executive, philanthropist
- Spouse: Eva Stern
- Children: 2
- Parent(s): Sylvia Goodman Stern; Albert B. Stern

Marc Stern is an American attorney, business executive and philanthropist. He serves as the Chairman of the TCW Group, an asset management financial institution based in Los Angeles, California. He also owns minority stakes in Major League Baseball's Milwaukee Brewers and the NBA's Milwaukee Bucks. Marc serves as the Chairman of the Los Angeles Opera.

== Early life ==
Marc Irwin Stern was born to a Jewish family in Vineland, New Jersey, the son of Sylvia (née Goodman) and Albert B. Stern. He graduated from the Dickinson College in Carlisle, Pennsylvania, where he received a Bachelor of Arts degree in Political Science and History. He then received a master's degree in Government and a J.D. from Columbia University in New York City.

== Career ==
Stern practiced law at Debevoise & Plimpton, a law firm based in New York City, from 1970 to 1974. He then worked for Allied-Signal from 1974 to 1986. Later, he served as Managing Director and Chief Administrative Officer of The Henley Group. He was then President of SunAmerica, which later became a subsidiary of the American International Group (AIG).

Stern served as President of the TCW Group from 1990 to 2005. He then served as Vice Chairman of the Board from 2005 to 2013, and as Chief Executive Officer from 2009 to 2012. He also served on the Management Committee and the Global Investment Management and Services (GIMS) of the Société Générale from 2007 to 2013, as the TCW Group was the owned by the Société Générale; it is now owned by The Carlyle Group. In 2009, he fired Jeffrey Gundlach, an asset manager who went on to establish his own company, DoubleLine Capital. After Gundlach sued TCW for US$500 million, Stern testified that he had feared Gundlach would steal TCW's client list to start his own company.

Stern has served as the Chairman of the TCW Group in 2013. He has served on the Board of Directors of Qualcomm since February 1994.

Stern's interest in sports has led him to have minority ownership holdings in the Milwaukee Brewers, a professional baseball team and the Milwaukee Bucks, a professional basketball team. Both teams are based in Milwaukee, Wisconsin. Marc was a member of the Olympic Bid Committee that successfully secured the 2028 Summer Games for Los Angeles. The Games of the XXXIV Olympiad will be the third time hosting for the city and its surrounding metro area, the prior events being the Summer Games of the X Olympiad in 1932 and the Summer Games of the XXIII Olympiad in 1984.

== Philanthropy ==
Stern serves as the Chairman of the Board of Trustees of the Los Angeles Opera. He is also a major donor to the Los Angeles Philharmonic. He serves on the Boards of Trustees of the Performing Arts Center of Los Angeles County and the John F. Kennedy Center for the Performing Arts, the California Institute of Technology, the New York City Metropolitan Opera, and The Los Angeles Coalition. He was made a Commandeur de l'Ordre National du Mérite by the Republic of France. He and his wife run The Marc and Eva Stern Foundation (formerly The Stern Family Foundation) which focuses on arts and culture; diseases and conditions; education; Judaism; museums; nonprofits; performing arts; Judaic institutions; and public charities.

The Marc and Eva Stern Math and Science School in Los Angeles is named after him and his wife.

== Political activity ==
With his wife, Stern co-chaired a 2011 fundraiser for Republican presidential candidate Mitt Romney at the Beverly Hilton Hotel in Beverly Hills, California. He serves on the National Council of the American Enterprise Institute.

== Personal life ==
Stern is married to Eva Stern, a clinical social worker and philanthropist. They have two children. They reside in Malibu, California.
