= Pumpkin Patch (retailer) =

New Zealand childrenswear retailer

- Founded: 1990; 36 years ago
- Founder: Sally Synott
- Headquarters: Auckland, New Zealand
- Area served: Australia & New Zealand
- Products: Children's and babies' clothing
- Owner: Alceon Group
- Website: pumpkinpatch.co.nz

Pumpkin Patch was a New Zealand childrenswear retailer. Established in 1990, it focuses on the design, marketing, retail and wholesale of children's clothing to customers in Australia and New Zealand.

== History ==
=== Before receivership ===
The company was founded in New Zealand in 1990 as a mail order catalogue by Sally Synott. At its peak, the company was valued at over $NZ830 million and employed over 2,000 people. It operated over 180 stores across Australia and New Zealand, as well as in Asia, Ireland, the Middle East, South Africa, the United Kingdom and the United States.

In 2010, the company 48 stores around New Zealand, including 18 in Auckland.

In 2014, the firm began to experience declining revenues and margin compression due to competition.

By 2015, the company had helped raise $NZD600,000 for the children's medical charity Cure Kids.

In 2015, a Roy Morgan survey of Australian consumers identified Pumpkin Patch as having the best customer service in the children's clothing category. In the same year, it also received an award for customer service from Essential Baby Magazine for customer service.

=== Following receivership ===
In October 2016 the company was placed into receivership by ANZ Bank with $76 million in debt and posting a $15.5 million loss. The receivers closed seven New Zealand stores and 52 Australia stores.

In February 2017, all remaining retail stores closed following a three month fire sale and failing to find a 'serious' buyer. Prof Gary Mortimer speculated it was kicked out of the market by much cheaper retailers such as Kmart Australia and other children's stores, while reporter Dana McCauley suggests it also due to its aggressive international expansion compounded by being antiquated and not value-for-money until a "too-little-too-late" restructure. In March 2017, the company was placed into liquidation.

In December 2017, Pumpkin Patch was acquired by Catch Group, and relaunched as an online store in both Australia and New Zealand.

In 2018 the company was bought by Alceon Group. Pumpkin Patch products became available through EziBuy, online and in physical stores, and there were plans for a full re-launch in 2019.

In 2023, EziBuy was placed into administration by buyer Mosaic Brands and closed all its stores, then ceased trading after failing to find a buyer. In 2024, Mosaic Brands was placed into administration, dismantled by receivers, then ceased trading after failing to find a buyer.
