= Oaktree Capital Management =

American management firm

Oaktree Capital Management, Inc.

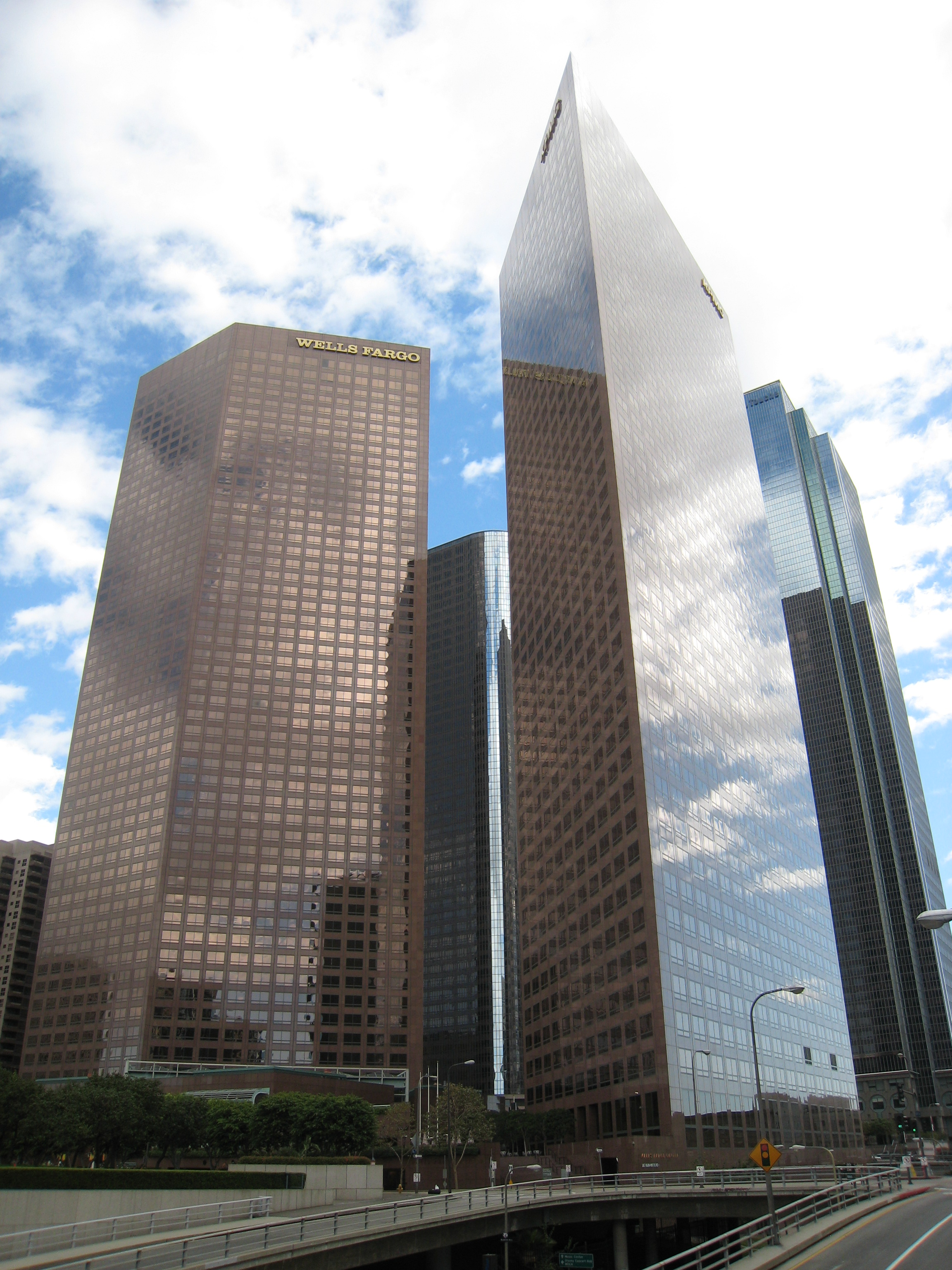
- Headquarters at Wells Fargo Tower
- Type: Public
- Traded as: NYSE: OAK.PRA NYSE: OAK.PRB
- Industry: Financial services
- Founded: April 1995; 31 years ago
- Founders: Howard Marks, Bruce Karsh, Larry Keele, Richard Masson, Sheldon Stone
- Headquarters: Los Angeles, California, U.S.
- Number of locations: 26
- Key people: Howard Marks (co-chairman); Bruce Karsh (co-chairman and CIO); John Frank (vice chairman); Armen Panossian (co-CEO); Robert O'Leary (co-CEO); Todd Molz (COO)
- AUM: US$223 billion (as of December 31, 2025)
- Owner: Brookfield Asset Management
- Subsidiaries: Internazionale (99.6%)
- Website: oaktreecapital.com

Oaktree Capital Management, Inc. is an American asset management firm, headquartered in Los Angeles, United States, specializing in alternative investment strategies. As of December 31, 2025, the company managed $223 billion for its clientele.

The firm was co-founded in 1995 by a group that had formerly worked together at the TCW Group starting in the 1980s. On April 12, 2012, Oaktree Capital Group, LLC became listed on the NYSE under the ticker symbol OAK. On March 13, 2019, Canada's Brookfield Asset Management announced that it had agreed to buy 62% of Oaktree Capital Management for approximately $4.7 billion.

== Firm overview ==
The firm is based in Los Angeles. Since its formation in 1995, Oaktree has become the largest distressed-debt investor in the world. Oaktree's clientele includes multiple U.S. pension plans, state retirement plans in the United States, sovreign wealth funds, hundreds of corporations and/or their pension funds, as well as other university, charitable and other endowments and foundations. Oaktree is a repository for pension-fund and endowment money. The company's distressed-debt funds have at times been over-subscribed, and in 2010 Oaktree turned down potential investors due to self-imposed limits on fund size. Oaktree's current investment activities are divided across three asset classes: credit, equity, and real estate.

== History ==
=== 1990s ===
Oaktree was founded in 1995 by a group of principals who first joined at the TCW Group in the mid-1980s Within three months of its founding in 1995, "more than 30 TCW clients transferred $1.5 billion in assets to Oaktree."

Oaktree has formed various sub-advisory relationships since 1995. In 1996, Oaktree was selected as the sub-advisor for the Vanguard Convertible Securities Fund.

Since 1995, Oaktree has created what it refers to as "step-out" strategies, usually coincident with the opening of new offices around the world. Its growth in strategies has largely focused on expanding into European and Asian markets. Between 1997 and 1999, Oaktree created three new strategies: Emerging Markets Absolute Return in 1997, European High Yield Bonds in 1999, and Power Opportunities in 1999.

=== 2000s ===
In 2001, Oaktree continued to introduce new "step-out" strategies, starting with Mezzanine Finance. Asia Principal Opportunities (2006) followed, along with European Principal Investments (2006), European Senior Loans (2006), U.S. Senior Loans and Value Opportunities (2007), Global High Yield Bonds (2010), Emerging Markets Equities (2011), and Real Estate Debt (2012).

In 2005, the Securities And Exchange Commission ordered Oaktree to pay a fine, interest, and disgorge profits after the SEC ruled they had "sold securities short" before the five legal business days after a public offering pricing had gone public. Oaktree was required to put in place policies and procedures to prevent violations in the future.

In 2008, the firm raised $11 billion for their distressed debt fund. In 2009, Oaktree was selected by the U.S. Treasury, along with eight other managers (BlackRock, Invesco, AllianceBernstein and others) to participate in the government's Public-Private Investment Program (PPIP). As of December 31, 2018, the Oaktree PPIP Fund, L.P. had a gross return of 28%.

=== 2010s ===
In 2009, Oaktree acquired a 20% stake in DoubleLine Capital, a Los Angeles-based investment firm specializing in mortgage-backed fixed income portfolios.

The firm's relationship with Vanguard was expanded in 2011 when Oaktree was selected as one of four firms to manage Vanguard's Emerging Markets Select Stock Fund. In 2010, Oaktree was named one of three advisors to the Russell Global Opportunistic Credit Fund and was selected as a manager for the Credit Suisse (Lux) I Fund in 2011.

Seeking investment opportunities created by the European sovereign-debt crisis, Oaktree started its European Principal Fund III in November 2011 with committed capital of some €3 billion.

On April 12, 2012, Oaktree became a publicly traded partnership with shares listed on the NYSE. The company was previously listed on GSTrUE, a private over-the-counter exchange run by Goldman Sachs which officially ceased operations in 2012 after Oaktree, along with Apollo Global Management (in 2011), de-listed and moved to the NYSE.

According to the company's 2015 published financial results, Oaktree raised $12 billion for Oaktree Opportunities Funds X and Xb ("Opps X and Xb").

In 2017, Eaton Vance launched the Oaktree Diversified Credit NextShares exchange-traded managed fund with Oaktree as subadvisor.

In 2018, Oaktree filed a registration statement to launch a non-traded REIT.

On March 13, 2019, Brookfield Asset Management announced that it had agreed to buy 62% of Oaktree Capital Management for about $4.7 billion, creating one of the world's largest alternative money managers. On September 30, 2019, completion of the acquisition of a majority stake by Brookfield Asset Management was announced.

=== 2020s ===
In November 2021, Oaktree closed its largest fund, Opportunities Fund XI LP, after collecting $15.9 billion.

In March 2022, Oaktree acquired a majority stake in 17Capital, a private credit firm focused on NAV lending based in London. In February 2023, the company launched a private credit fund, Oaktree Lending Partners, which finances private equity takeovers. In June 2023, Robert O'Leary and Armen Panossian were named as the incoming co-CEOs. As of August 2023, Oaktree was trying to raise over $18 billion for its 12th fund, Oaktree Opportunities Fund XII, potentially becoming the largest-ever private debt fund.

In July 2024, it was announced that Lloyds Banking Group partnered with Oaktree to finance UK buyouts.

In July 2025, Oaktree acquired media company FilmRise, and announced that they would be merging FilmRise with Shout! Studios to form the combined holding company Radial Entertainment.

In October 2025, Brookfield Corporation and Brookfield Asset Management agreed to acquire the rest of Oaktree for $3 billion, fully owning the business and expanding its private credit portfolio.

In December 2025, it was announced Oaktree had sold approximately 14 per cent of its shareholding in TORM to BW Group subsidiary Hafnia Limited for US$311.43 million. The transaction reduced Oaktree's ownership position while leaving it as a continuing shareholder in TORM.

== Select past and current investments ==
- Aleris International – acquired 1 May 2010
- Almatis Group — acquired 2010
- Billabong – Australia's largest surfwear company.
- Campofrío Food Group – (24%) European food industry. Sold in 2013.
- Conbipel – (100%) Italian fashion industry
- Environmental 360 Solutions – Canadian Environmental Management company
- Fitness First – Global health club chain. Taken over in partnership with Marathon Asset Management in 2012. Parts of business subsequently sold in whole or in part in 2016–17.
- Inter Milan – (99.6%) Italian football team.
- Loews Cineplex Entertainment – jointly acquired by Onex Corporation from Sony Pictures and Universal Studios in 2002. U.S. division was sold in 2004 to The Carlyle Group (in turn merged with AMC Theatres in 2006); Canadian subsidiary merged with Galaxy Entertainment to form Cineplex Galaxy, renamed to Cineplex Entertainment in 2005.
- Mail Boxes Etc. – potential acquisition of up to 40% ownership via a phased $132 million reserved capital increase in February 2020.
- Marlin Brands 50% of Marlin Brands with Alceon Group.
- MediaWorks New Zealand – acquired a controlling 77.8% share in the business, after recently purchasing shares from RBS and Westpac; acquisition completed April 29, 2015.
- Nine Entertainment – taken over (alongside Apollo Global Management and Goldman Sachs) from CVC Asia Pacific in a refinancing deal in Oct 2012, sold final stake in 2017.
- Quiksilver – American retail sporting company
- Sky Holding – jet airplane ownership
- Caen, Ligue 2 football club in France. Held 80% of the club's shares – acquisition completed in September 2020. Sold stake to Kylian Mbappé in 2024.
- Tribune Company – acquired jointly with JPMorgan Chase and Angelo Gordon; acquisition completed July 2012.
- Verreries de l'Orne à Ecouché – glass etching firm – 1 April 2010
- Zzoomm, UK-based telecommunications company. Majority stake acquired for £100 million in September 2020.

== See also ==
- Category:Oaktree Capital Management
- Ownership of Hartree Partners, major financier of controversial mining project in Hammerfest, Norway
