= Esky =

Australian brand of portable coolers

- Type: Subsidiary
- Industry: Outdoor recreation
- Founded: 1884
- Founder: Francis Malley
- Headquarters: Sydney, Australia
- Products: Camping equipment
- Parent: Coleman
- Website: esky.com.au

Esky is a brand of portable coolers, originally Australian, derived from the word eskimo. The term esky is also commonly used in Australia to generically refer to portable coolers or ice boxes and is part of the Australian vernacular, in place of words like cooler or cooler box.

The brand name was purchased from Nylex by Coleman in 2009.

== History ==
Some historians have credited Malley's with the invention of the portable ice cooler. According to the company, the Esky was "recognised as the first official portable cooler in the world." The company's own figures claim that, by 1960, 500,000 Australian households owned one (in a country of approximately three million households at the time).

The brand "Esky" was used from around 1945, for an Australian-made ice chest, a free-standing 44 by 23 by 16 inches (112 cm × 58 cm × 41 cm) insulated cabinet with two compartments: the upper to carry a standard (23 pounds (10 kg)) block of ice, and the lower for food and drinks. It was made in Sydney by Malleys but did not carry their name until around 1949.

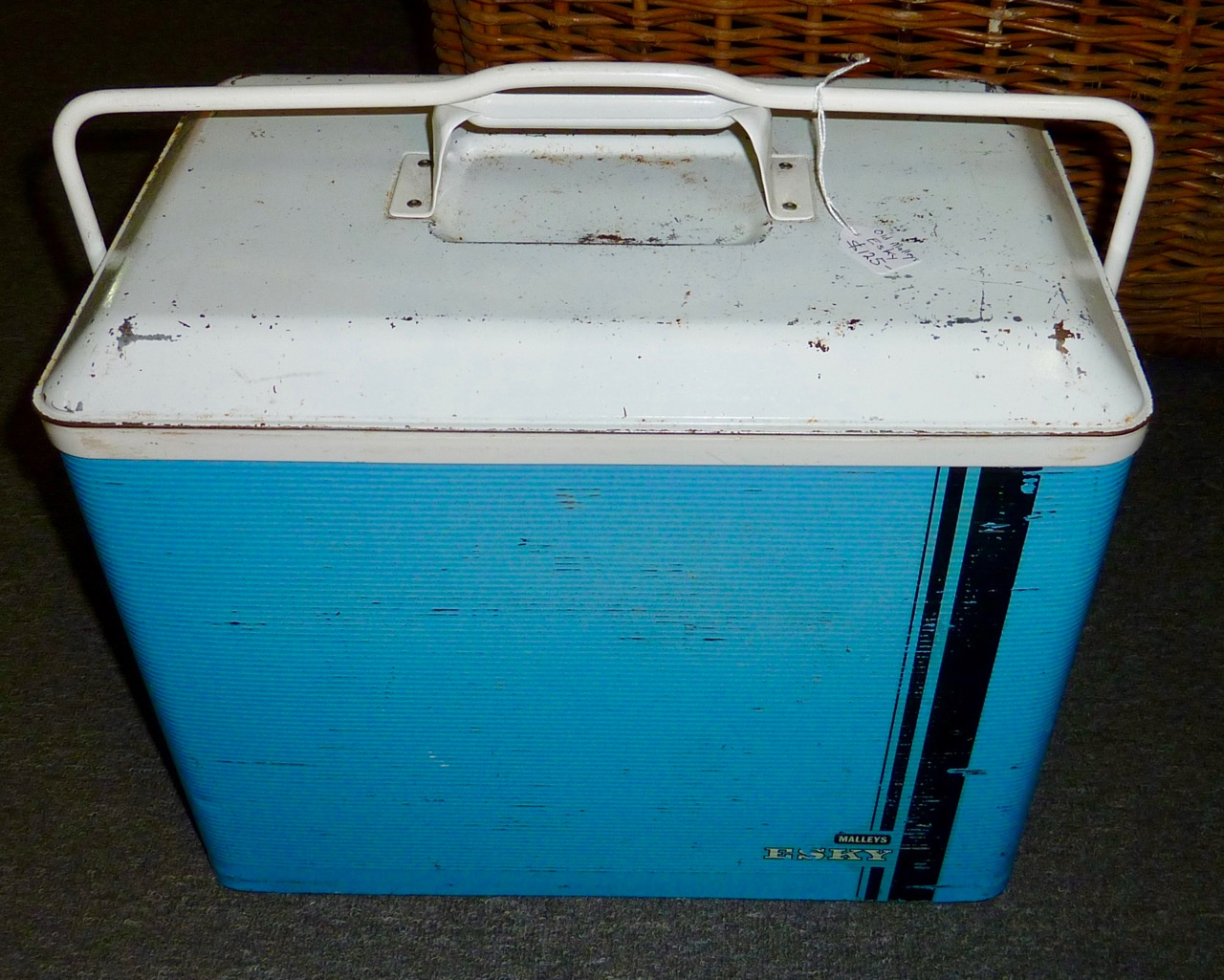
Early "Malleys Esky"

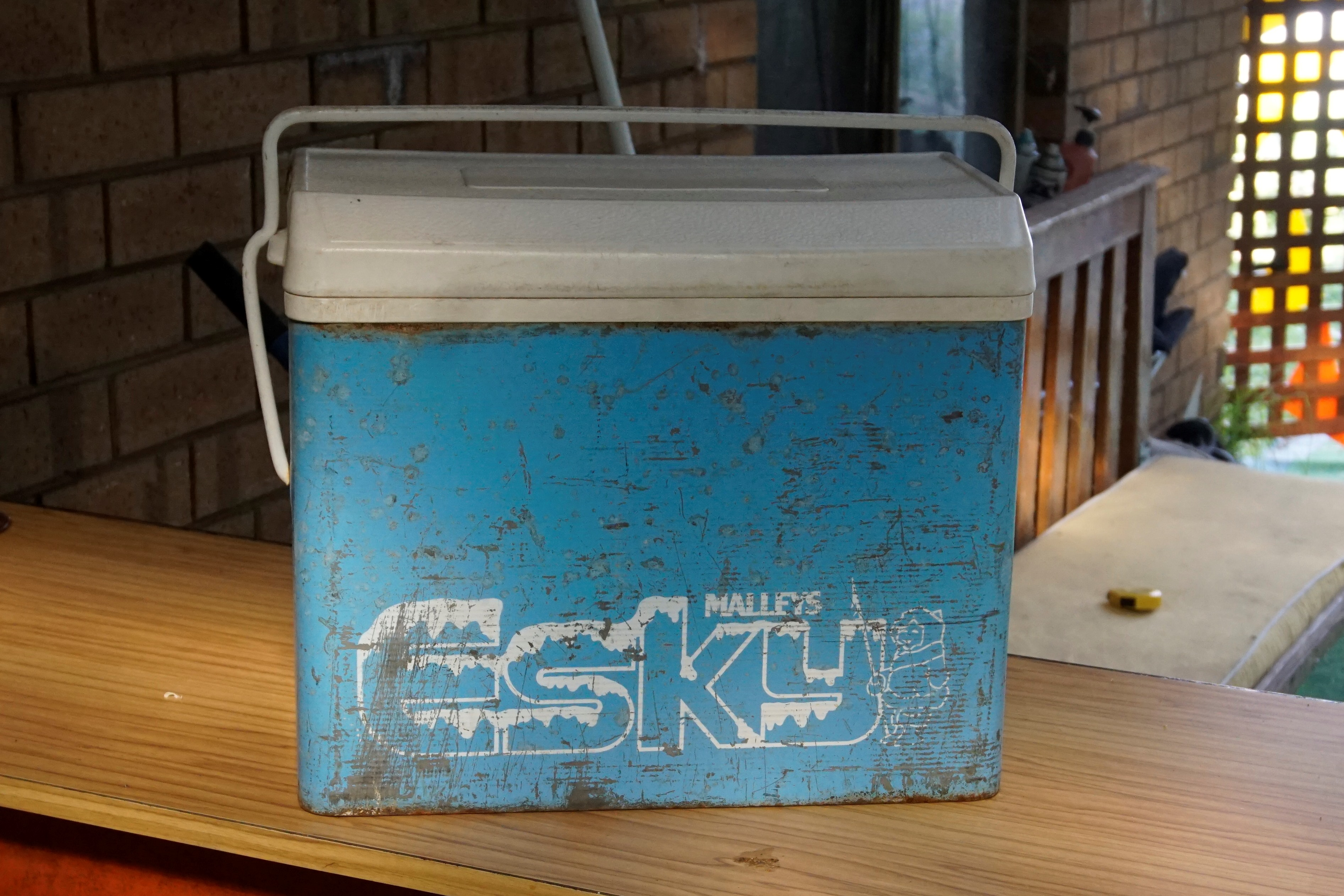
Malleys Esky c. 1965

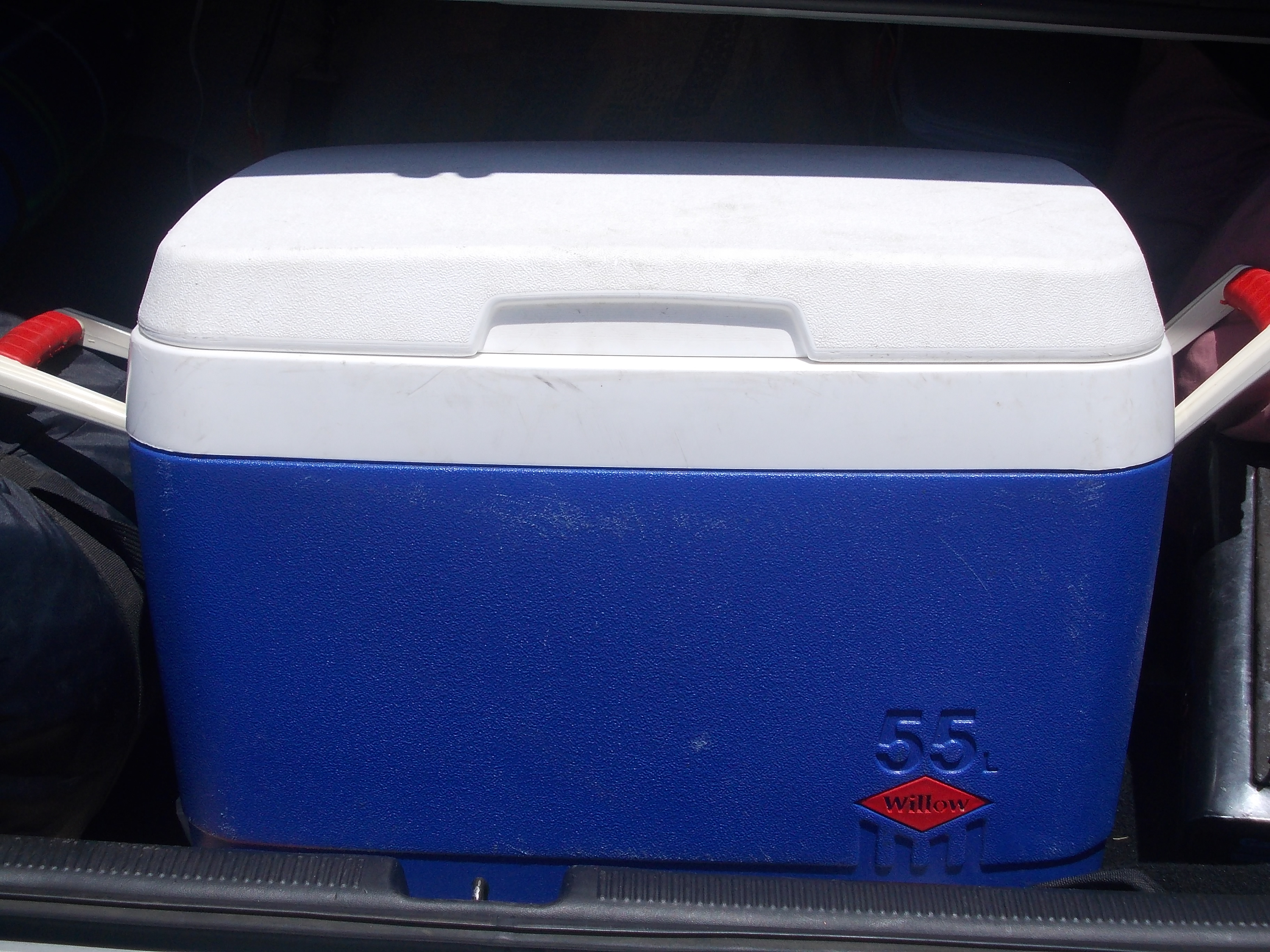
Moulded plastic esky by Willow Ware Australia

The first (metal-cased) portable Esky appeared in 1952, sized to accommodate six 26 imperial fluid ounces (740 ml) bottles of beer or soft drink, as advertised nationally. By 1965 "esky" (no capital E) was being used in Australian literature for such coolers, and in 1973 Malleys, owners of the tradename, acknowledged that the term had entered the vernacular and was being used for lightweight plastic imitations.

One such brand was Willow, an Australian manufacturer, previously known for domestic "tinware" — buckets, bins, cake tins and oven trays. (Note: Willow had its origin in Wilson Brothers Pty, founded by Ralph and Richard, sons of Ralph Wilson, sen., (c. 1826 – 14 June 1901) and Elizabeth Wilson ( – 21 April 1912). With start-up capital from their parents, they began making tin cans in 1887, then developed a factory in Sutton Street, North Melbourne, which in 1930 occupied 2 acres (0.81 ha). Ralph Wilson (1865 – 10 December 1930) married Agnes Kirkwood Twaddell (1870–1946) in 1896, and had a home "Benarty", in High Street, Malvern. He seems to have been a respected employer, but nothing has been found of his brother Richard's involvement, apart from his retirement in 1906. Apart from robberies and vandalism, the company was never in the news; they established the Willow brand in the 1920s, making billies, Coolgardie safes, etc.; became W., M., Y., and A. H. Wilson Ltd. They later moved to Tullamarine, and now only make plastic products. Since 2018 owned by Decor Corporation, a subsidiary of Marlin Management Services.)

Nylex started making the plastic-cased Esky in 1984. In 1993 Nylex was still defending their ownership of the Esky trademark, but by 2002 they had allowed it to lapse.

Outdoor recreation company Coleman bought the Esky brands from Nylex after the company went into administration in February 2009, and later that year Coleman was producing most of the Esky line in Melbourne. The sale was seen as symptomatic of the decline of Australian-made goods due to cheaper imports.

== Construction ==
Current models are constructed with two layers: polypropylene on the outer shell, with a polyurethane inner layer. This makes it lightweight and portable with excellent insulation. The original Esky had a lightweight galvanized iron outer shell and lining, and used cork compound insulation. Later models had a plastic inner and polystyrene foam insulation. Later coolers have been moulded entirely from polystyrene foam. They are lightweight and inexpensive, but are easily damaged or destroyed.

The lightweight construction makes most eskies float in water, and they have been recommended by safety specialists to be used as an improvised lifebuoy, if more specialised equipment is not available. Numerous people have been saved after using either the whole esky or the esky lid as flotation devices after boating accidents.

== Generic use ==
In Australia, the 'esky' name has become, or as a legal matter nearly has become, genericised: the popularity of the product has led to the use of its name to refer to any cooler box, regardless of the brand. Many dictionaries, including the Australian National Dictionary and the Macquarie Dictionary, now include definitions in their publications defining it as such. However, the use of the Esky trademark must be approved by the brand owner to avoid any liability.

Government agencies and media outlets in Australia have used the term in preference to generic alternatives.

== In Australian culture ==
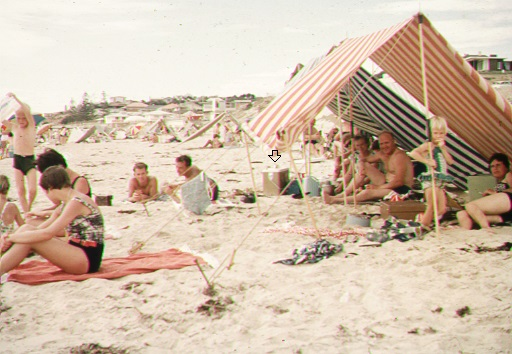
Adelaide beach scene 1965, an Esky may be seen at centre.

The esky has played a unique role in Australian culture, especially with regard to outdoor activities, camping, and sporting events, and for reasons of novelty. In particular, the design and use of the esky has evolved through its relationship with Australia's drinking culture. The first portable Esky was designed to carry six "standard" 26 fluid ounce (740 ml) bottles as well as a triple level food section. Malley's Esky was created as a tool for camping and caravanning holidays and was called the Esky Auto Box, encouraged by the post-war popularity of the private motor vehicle. The esky became an essential part of the beach, outdoor dining and barbecue culture that developed in Australia during the 60s and 70s. Due to their portability and extensive use outdoors, an esky can also double as makeshift cricket stumps, with some companies making hybrid products that include retractable stumps (among other useful features such as a bottle opener).

Though not unique to Australia, Australian media have widely reported on a number of high-profile incidents involving motorised eskies fitted with small motors and wheels. Police have impounded offending vehicles and have issued fines to those operating them on public property.

Spectators at the closing ceremony at the 2000 Summer Olympics in Sydney each received a promotional pack of a small polystyrene Esky containing other items of memorabilia.

In another uniquely Australian piece of culture, poly-foam bodyboards used in the surf are often referred to by the slang term, "Esky-lid”, or “shark biscuit”.
