= DoubleLine Capital =

American investment firm

DoubleLine Capital LP
- Company type: Private
- Industry: Investment Management
- Founded: December 2009; 16 years ago
- Founder: Jeffrey Gundlach
- Headquarters: Tampa, Florida, U.S.
- Key people: Jeffrey Gundlach (CEO and CIO)
- Products: Mutual funds Closed-end funds Exchange-traded funds UCITS
- AUM: US$91.2 billion (March 2023)
- Owners: Oaktree Capital Management (20%)
- Number of employees: 284 (March 2023)
- Website: doubleline.com

DoubleLine Capital ("DoubleLine") is an American investment management firm headquartered in Tampa, Florida. It is known for its focus on investing in the bond market but also invests in other asset classes such as equities and commodities. The firm is majority owned by its employees.

== Background ==
Jeffrey Gundlach was employed at TCW Group where he managed its Total Return Bond Fund which at the time was one of the top performing funds in the last 10 years that invested in intermediate-term bonds. It produced returns that exceeded those that were managed by Bill Gross. On 4 December 2009, he was fired by TCW and was alleged to be engaged in gross misconduct by plotting to take TCW's clients and trade secrets to establish his own rival firm. It was noted that the relationship between Gundlach and senior members such as Marc Stern and Robert Addison Day had deteriorated before then.

In December 2009, shortly after leaving TCW, Gundlach, Philip Barach and 14 senior members of their team set up DoubleLine Capital in Los Angeles, California. The name DoubleLine came from a painting by Piet Mondrian called Double Line. Gundlach and Barach reached out to Howard Marks who was the co-founder of Oaktree Capital Management as well as a former employee of TCW who knew them during their time there. Oaktree Capital Management invested $20 million in DoubleLine for a 20% stake. On 23 December, DoubleLine registered with the Securities and Exchange Commission.

On 7 January 2010, TCW sued Gundlach with DoubleLine being named as a defendant in the case. TCW alleged that Gundlach and the firm stole its company secrets and clients. 45 out of 65 of Gundlach's old TCW team had joined DoubleLine. Gundlach countersued TCW stating it owed him millions in unpaid compensation. By December 2011, the lawsuit was settled. TWC prevailed on the trade secret case but the jury awarded nothing for the damages. An undisclosed settlement was reached between Gundlach and TCW. Gundlach prevailed on the unpaid compensation case and the jury awarded him and three other former TCW employees $66.7 million in unpaid wages.

On 6 April 2010, DoubleLine started accepted investor money and launched its own Total Return Fund which was managed by Gundlach himself. By December that year, the firm had over $7 billion in assets under management.

In July 2011, DoubleLine launched its first closed-end fund, the DoubleLine Opportunistic Credit Fund which was managed by Gundlach himself.

By November 2012, DoubleLine was managing $50 billion.

In January 2013, DoubleLine established a new division that would manage equity portfolios called DoubleLine Equity LP.

It was reported that after the 2016 United States presidential election, Gundlach who voted for Donald Trump and predicted his victory forwarded an email to DoubleLine employees with an image of Trump smiling in front of a garbage truck carting Hillary Clinton and Barack Obama away. The image angered some of the employees, who felt it blurred the line between politics and business.

In 2019, the firm experienced a number of high level staff departures which was considered uncharacteristic. During this period DoubleLine's performance had dropped however it had over $140 billion in assets under management.

In February 2022, DoubleLine moved its headquarters from Los Angeles to Tampa, Florida due to its tax laws.

In April 2022, DoubleLine launched its first two exchange-traded funds (ETF), the DoubleLine Opportunistic Bond ETF and the DoubleLine Shiller CAPE US Equities ETF. Prior to that, DoubleLine served as sub-advisor to ETFs offered by State Street Global Advisors and AdvisorShares.

In April 2023, one year after its ETF debut, DoubleLine moved into the real estate ETF market, launching the DoubleLine Commercial Real Estate ETF and the DoubleLine Mortgage ETF.

== Investment funds ==
Fund	Vintage Year	Capital ($m)
DoubleLine Core Fixed Income N (DLFNX)	2010	$6,600
DoubleLine Total Return Bond I (DBLTX)	2010	$30,200
DoubleLine Emerging Markets Fixed Inc N (DLENX)	2010	$455.5
DoubleLine Low Duration Bond I (DBLSX)	2011	$5,700
DoubleLine Floating Rate N (DLFRX)	2013	$183
DoubleLine Flexible Income I (DFLEX)	2014	$1,000
DoubleLine Long Duration Total Ret Bd I (DBLDX)	2014	$63
Doubleline Selective Credit I (DBSCX)	2014	$532
DoubleLine Global Bond N (DLGBX)	2015	$145
DoubleLine Strategic Commodity I (DBCMX)	2015	$141
DoubleLine Infrastructure Income I (BILDX)	2016	$374,400
DoubleLine Infrastructure Income N (BILTX)	2016	$374,400
DoubleLine Emerging Markets Fixed Inc I (DBLEX)	2019	$455,500
DoubleLine Core Fixed Income R6 (DDCFX)	2019	$6,600
DoubleLine Multi-Asset Trend N (DLMOX)	2021	$12.3
