= EziBuy =

Multi-channel retailer

EziBuy Limited
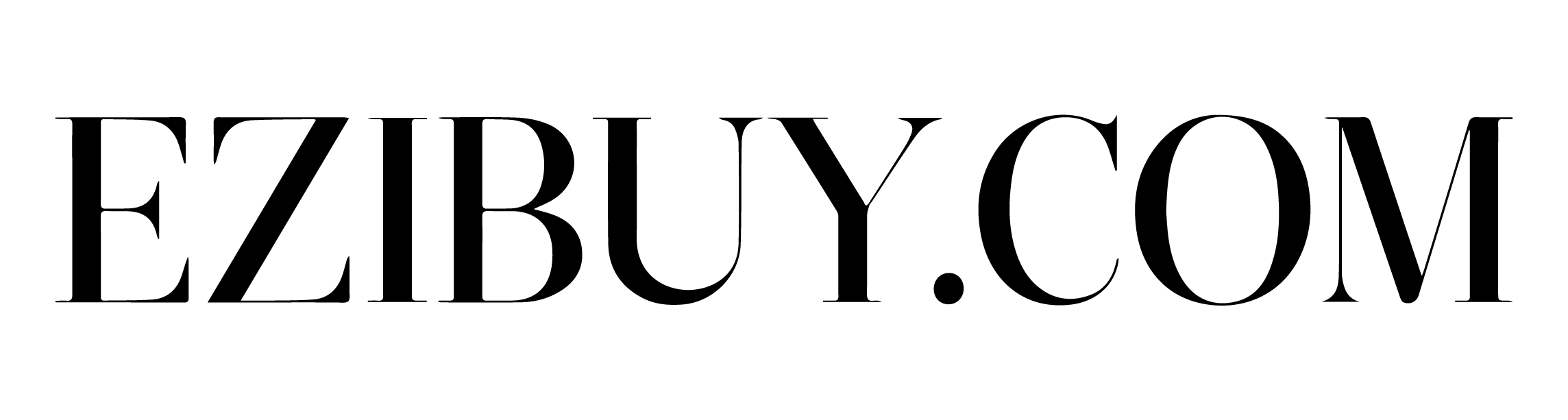
- Type: Subsidiary
- Industry: Retail
- Founded: 1978
- Founder: Peter Gillespie; Gerard Gillespie
- Headquarters: Auckland City 1010, New Zealand
- Key people: Acting MD: Edwina Neilson
- Products: Women's clothes, Children's clothes, Men's clothes, Shoes, Accessories, Homeware
- Parent: Mosaic Brands
- Website: ezibuy.com

EziBuy is a New Zealand and Australian multi-channel retailer. It sells clothing, homeware and gifts through a multi-channel model in both countries.

Products can be purchased through catalogues, and four retail stores around New Zealand. The retailer has a cell centre and distribution centre in Palmerston North, where it has been based since its inception in 1979.

EziBuy featured a wide selection of brands such as Capture, Emerge, Urban and Grace Hill as well as Profile – a corporate clothing company and a shareholding in JK Kids, a nationwide children’s clothing chain. For plus-sized women Ezibuy had Sara, Formfit, Deesse, Isobar Active Plus and Quayside Plus Size.

== History ==
=== Gillespie era ===
EziBuy was established in 1978 by brothers Peter and Gerard Gillespie, and their friend John Robinson in Palmerston North, New Zealand. The business began as a catalogue retailer selling womenswear and menswear. The first catalogue was a simple folded, A3 black and white page which was mailed to a list of local organisations in 1978. The Gillespies were joined five years later by Matt Toynbee who they later acknowledged for his huge contribution to the company.

In January 2002, EziBuy purchased Myer Direct from Coles Myer.

In January 2006, the company opened a new distribution centre in Palmerston North.

In 2007 Ezibuy purchased the womenswear retail chain Max Fashions.

EziBuy won the Keith Norris Direct Marketing Organisation of the Year Award in 2012.

=== Woolworths era ===
In August 2013, EziBuy was acquired by the Woolworths conglomerate.

At the time of sale, EziBuy was the largest fashion and homeware multi-channel retailer in Australasia. The business mailed over 23 million catalogues every year and processed more than 1.75 million orders annually.

=== Alceon era ===
In June 2017, EziBuy was acquired by Alceon Group, a major shareholder of Australian womenswear retailer Noni B, for an undisclosed sum.

In October 2018, Alceon purchased New Zealand children's clothing retailer Pumpkin Patch for an undisclosed sum, allowing it to relaunch the brand through EziBuy.

=== Noni B and Mosaic era ===
Noni B Limited purchased a 50.1 per cent stake in EziBuy from Alceon Group in a $1 peppercorn sale in 2019. The sale was aimed at increasing the retailer's digital sales and giving it access to the New Zealand market. Noni B Limited changed its name to Mosaic Brands in November 2019 and purchased the remaining 49.9 per cent stake for $11 million in October 2021.

In August 2021, EziBuy announced a restructure after posting a $28.9 million loss for the year to June 2021 during the COVID-19 pandemic.

In April 2023, Mosaic placed EziBuy into administration, with plans to restructure it. With this the remaining stores were closed down and the retailer went online only.

The brand entered liquidation in July 2023 with creditors owed more than $100 million.
