= Bruce Karsh =

American businessman

Bruce A. Karsh
- Born: October 10, 1955 (age 70)
- Education: Duke University (B.A.); University of Virginia (J.D.)
- Occupations: Co-chairman and CIO, Oaktree Capital Management; Executive board member and minority owner of the Golden State Warriors
- Spouse: Martha

Bruce Karsh (born October 10, 1955) is an American investor and former lawyer. In the early 1980s he was an appellate clerk to former Supreme Court of the United States justice Anthony M. Kennedy, and later worked at O'Melveny & Myers, Sun Life Insurance Company (formerly Kaufman & Broad), and the TCW Group. He co-founded Oaktree Capital Management in 1995, later becoming the firm's co-chairman and CIO. As of August 2020, according to Forbes magazine, he has a net worth of $2.1 billion, ranking him No. 391 on the Forbes 400.

== Early life and education ==
Bruce A. Karsh was born in 1955 to a Jewish family, the son of David H. Karsh, and Roberta "Bobby" Karsh. In 1974, he graduated from Ladue Horton Watkins High School in St. Louis. In 1977, Karsh earned an A.B. degree in economics from Duke University where he graduated summa cum laude and was elected to Phi Beta Kappa. In 1980 he earned a J.D. from the University of Virginia School of Law, where he received the academic award Order of the Coif. While at the University of Virginia he served as notes editor for the Virginia Law Review.

== Career ==
=== Early years (1980–1995) ===
Following law school Karsh served as an appellate clerk to former Supreme Court of the United States justice Anthony M. Kennedy. He went on to work as an attorney with the law firm O'Melveny & Myers, then served as an assistant to billionaire Eli Broad, who was then the chairman of Sun Life Insurance Company and SunAmerica.

In 1987, Broad's insurance company became a client of TCW Group. Shortly thereafter, Karsh was hired by Howard Marks to manage distressed debt at TCW. TCW's first distressed debt fund was started in 1988. Karsh served as managing director of TCW and managed the Special Credits Funds there.

=== Oaktree (1995–present) ===
In April 1995, Karsh, Howard Marks, and three other employees at TCW left their firm to found Oaktree Capital Management. Karsh became a portfolio manager for Oaktree's Distressed Opportunities and Value Opportunities strategies and Chief Investment Officer for the firm.

According to Ken Moelis, the CEO of Moelis & Company, Howard Marks is the public face of Oaktree while Karsh is the "'quiet secret' behind the scenes." Moelis has said that "If you say the name Bruce, people know you’re talking about Bruce Springsteen. There's one Bruce in music and one Bruce in distressed. He’s just a solid guy who does his homework and thinks through timing."

== Honors ==
Karsh (along with Howard Marks) received the Money Manager of the Year award at Institutional Investor's US Investment Management Awards in 2015. Along with his wife, Karsh received KIPP's Giving Tree Award in 2015. He was awarded the Duke University Medal in 2016.

In May 2023, the couple received an honorary doctorate degree from Howard University, along with Joe Biden, Keith Rowley, and Eugene Washington. In March 2024, they were the Presidents' Award honorees at the UNCF 80th anniversary gala.

== Philanthropy ==
In 1998, Karsh and his wife started the Karsh Family Foundation, a charitable organization that has donated or committed over $300 million for education and scholarships across all levels. Among their recipients have been Teach for America and KIPP. Karsh is the co-founder of The Painted Turtle, a non-profit organization that operates a camp for children with life-threatening diseases in Los Angeles.

The Karshes have given over $100 million to Duke University, almost all of which went to undergraduate financial aid. This included $12 million in 2005, $20 million in 2008, and $50 million in 2011 ($30 million for U.S. students and $20 million for international students). In 2016, The Office of Undergraduate Financial Support was named after the Karsh Family. The Karsh Alumni and Visitors Center was completed in 2019.

Karsh joined the Board of Directors for Duke University’s investment management company (DUMAC) in 2002, and in July 2005 was appointed Chairman. He served on the Duke University Board of Trustees from 2003 to 2015 and is now Trustee Emeritus.

Karsh and his family funded The Karsh Family Social Service Center at Wilshire Boulevard Temple in Los Angeles, where they are members. The Karsh Center includes a food pantry and free or low-cost dental and eye care, legal aid, and mental health services for low-income clients.

Bruce and Martha Karsh donated $43.9 million to the University of Virginia School of Law in 2018, the largest gift in school history; the money will be focused on student scholarships and the founding of the Karsh Center for Law and Democracy. They had made previous donations to the law school, including a renovation project to create the Karsh Student Services Center, which opened in 2012.

In January 2020, the couple donated $10 million to Howard University (the largest gift in the university's history) for Howard's Bison STEM Scholars Program, which was renamed Karsh STEM scholars program.

In July 2020, Bruce and Martha Karsh, through their Karsh Family Foundation, donated $25 million to Cedars-Sinai Medical Center to fund digestive and liver disease study and care. In appreciation of the donation, the Division of Digestive and Liver Diseases was named the Karsh Division of Gastroenterology and Hepatology. The pair give to a number of organizations and featured on the 2011 Chronicle 's annual Philanthropy 50 list on the biggest contributors, when they gave Duke University $50 million for scholarships.

In 2021, the couple gave $50 million to the University of Virginia to establish the Karsh Institute of Democracy, with the university matching the donation.

== Personal life ==
Karsh is married to Martha Karsh, an attorney and co-founder of Clark & Karsh, an architecture firm. They live in Beverly Hills, California, and have three children, a daughter-in-law, and a grandson.

In 2001, the Karshes purchased the rights to the Beatles 1964 film A Hard Day's Night from the estate of producer Walter Shenson. Karsh also co-owns the rights to the Beatles' 1965 follow-up film, Help!

The Karshes are minority co-owners of the Golden State Warriors, with Bruce serving as an executive board member for the franchise.
