= Cooler =

Insulated box used to keep food or drink cool

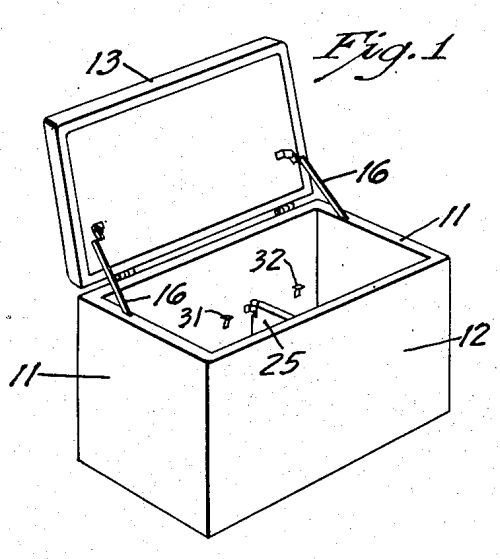
Portable Ice Chest, U.S. Patent # 2,663,167 (1953)

A cooler, portable ice chest, ice box, cool box, chilly bin (in New Zealand), or esky (Australia) is an insulated box used to keep food or drink cool.

Ice cubes are most commonly placed in it to help the contents inside stay cool. Ice packs are sometimes used, as they either contain the melting water inside or have a gel sealed inside that stays cold longer than plain ice (absorbing heat as it changes phase).

Coolers are often taken on picnics and on vacation or holidays. When summers are hot, they may also be used just to get cold groceries home from the store, such as keeping ice cream from melting in a sizzling automobile. Even without adding ice, this can be helpful, particularly if the trip home will be lengthy. Some coolers have built-in cupholders in the lid.

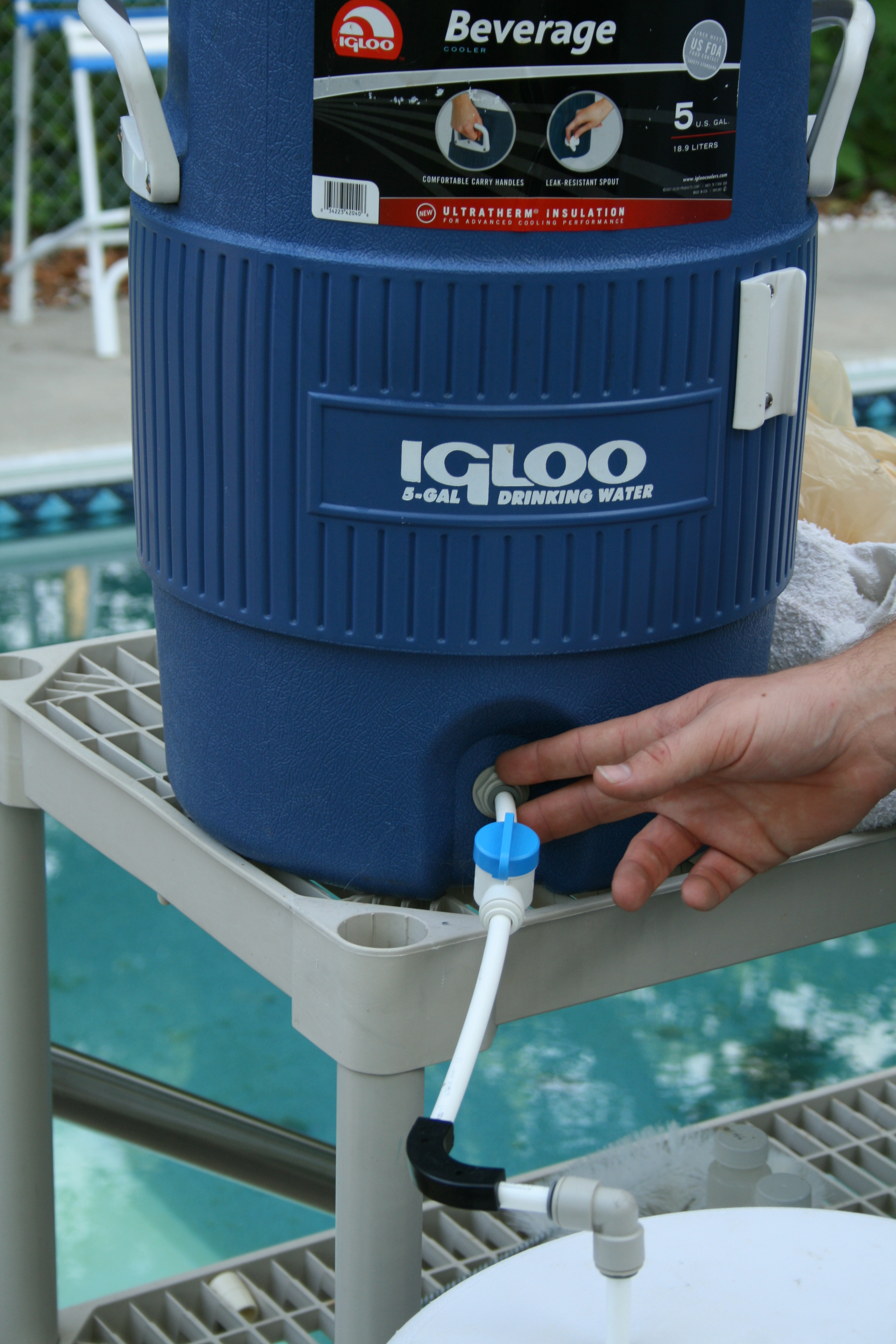
Insulated beverage cooler

They are usually made with interior and exterior shells of plastic, with a hard foam in between. They come in sizes from small personal ones to large family ones with wheels. Disposable ones are made solely from polystyrene foam (such as a disposable coffee cup) about 2 cm or one inch thick. Most reusable ones have molded-in handles; a few have shoulder straps. The cooler has developed from just a means of keeping beverages cold into a mode of transportation with the ride-on cooler. A thermal bag, cooler bag, or cool bag is very similar in concept, but typically smaller and not rigid.

== History ==
U.S. Patent # 1,531,867 (1925)

The original inventor of the cooler is unknown. Portable ice boxes for commercial use were patented in the 19th C.. One of the earliest recreational products is the Hawkeye refrigerator basket, produced by the Burlington Basket Co. of Iowa, a woven basket with a metal lining insulated with asbestos and fur felt, widely distributed across the United States from 1901 through at least 1943 in a wide range of sizes, and priced from just $3.25 for the 18" model in 1902. The metal Bauer Auto Ice Box produced by the Inland Refrigerator Co. of Spokane Washington was advertised in 1912. At this time prices for metal auto ice boxes were relatively high, one 1913 model being advertised for $15 in Minnesota, and two different sizes advertised in the Los Angeles Sunday Times in 1917 for $15 and $20.

Duplex automobile ice box 1924

Prices of the deluxe auto ice box dropped steadily in the 1920s. The Duplex automobile ice box advertised from 1923 was priced at $7.50 in 1924 and by 1927 they were being sold for $5. A portable ice box was featured in Popular Science Monthly in 1926, similar to the "Auto Ice Box" produced by Barclay Manufacturing Co., Muncie, Indiana in 1925. That same year, the Mawson Auto Car Ice box was advertised for sale in Australia. Barclay expanded production in 1926, and the Auto Ice Box was featured in the 1929 Sears Catalog. In 1928 the Monarch company introduced a competing Therm-A-Box, merging with its distributor Knapp the following year to form Knapp-Monarch. Prices of these new large auto ice boxes were now even more affordable, the small Mawson being offered for £3, two sizes of the Barclay auto ice box advertised by Sears from $4.25 in 1929 and another auto ice box was advertised at $3.19 in 1930, with eleven US manufacturers of "picnic ice boxes" listed in the July 1940 Hardware Age directory, although only a few resumed production after the war.

Grant M. Acton, of Acton Manufacturing Co., Arkansas City, Kansas, filed a patent application for the familiar metal-skin cooler with locking handle on October 1, 1947. The Patent (#2,570,300) was granted on Oct, 9 1951, and the company's Coca-Cola branded "Junior" coolers were being advertised as early as 14 April 1950. In his application, Acton cited two earlier patents for portable ice-chests filed by other designers in 1933. This followed the earlier Design Patent D-158,580 filed by Acton Aug 6, 1947 and registered Feb 8, 1949, produced by Acton Products Inc., as the Snackmaster brand cooler. This design was the subject of Acton Mfg. Co. v. Louisville Tin & Stove Co. doing business as Progress Refrigerator Company. Acton Mfg. (as TempRite Mfg. Co. Inc. until 1948) had begun production of the design (The later Acton Standard) in October 1945, which "attracted the attention of the officials of the defendant and they immediately set about to duplicate its general appearance and function" with the Progress No. A-1 cooler produced from 1947.. Louisville coolers produced under the soft drink company or Trip-nic brands were labeled Progress Refrigerator Company, but from 1952 old designs were sold under their Pleasure Chest trademark (USPTO serial number 71638802), expanding to three sizes designated Buddy, Master and Pal, with no mention of Progress Refrigerator on the cooler.

Similar fiberglass-insulated portable coolers proliferated by the early 1950s, such as the Metalcraft Magikooler. Poloron offered the Cola-Cooler alongside it's earlier deluxe Thermaster "refrigerator" and Knapp-Monarch returned with the Town and Country Therm-a-Chest. Preway, in contrast, continued production of it's pre-war (1937-1939) range of picnic ice boxes. Soft coolers appear at this time as well, such as Nappe Smith Mfg. Co.'s fiberglass-insulated Thermo-Keep and Nappy Two-Temp, and Rey Co.'s Carri-Ette.

A portable ice chest was patented in the USA by Richard C. Laramy of Joliet, Illinois. On February 24, 1951, Laramy filed an application with the United States Patent Office for a portable ice chest (Serial No. 212,573). The patent (#2,663,157) was issued on December 22, 1953, assigned to Queen Stove Works, Inc.. The company's KampKold portable coolers were acquired with the purchase of American Gas Machine Company, which had been selling portable ice boxes under that name since 1946. Queen Stove Works was acquired by King Seeley in 1957, and by 1967 KampKold was a product of the Thermos division, alongside the Vagabond and Little Brown Chest coolers that had been produced by Hemp & Co. from 1948.

Cooler - Clayton Metal Products, Staykold, Blue

In Australia, Clayton Metal Products in Edwardstown, South Australia introduced a portable cooler to their Staykold ice box range from 1949. In 1952, the portable Esky Auto Box was released in by the Sydney refrigeration company Malley's. Made from steel and finished in baked enamel and chrome, with cork sheeting for insulation, the Esky became one of the first mass-produced coolers on the market. The brand found huge success and by 1960, 500,000 Australian households owned one (in a country of approximately 3 million households at the time).

In 1953 Royal Manufacturing Co. was formed in Oklahoma to produce plastic coolers using United States Rubber Co.'s Royalite compound, a rubber resin mixture (ABS). Production in two different sizes began in 1954 after a merger to form Royal Mieco, Inc.. Cronstroms Manufacturing launched the Cronco Royal with a Royalite ABS lining and aluminum case mere weeks earlier (and three years before Coleman)..

The Coleman Company answered rival Queen Stove Works camping range with their first, all-metal, coolers in 1954, featuring welded galvanized liners and Spintex rock-wool insulation. Three years later, Coleman released the first Snow-Lite cooler, with "seamless" Royalite/Lustran ABS plastic liner and fiberglass insulation. SnowLite models were differentiated by a diamond logo from 1958, and the first styrene insulated and "steel-belted" models with a rustproof ABS base appeared in 1960 (Canadian models acquired the styrene insulation without the ABS base in 1959). The original auto-locking latch was replaced by a cam-type safety-latch from 1962.

Queen Products debuted its first Styra-Lite foam cooler in 1958, and in 1959 American Thermos unveiled the Chillybin (launched by Corbett Specialties, Inc. in 1958 and recently acquired by Thermos) and the Weber Plastics subsidiary of Weber Tackle Co. released the 13 Qt. Go-Kooler made from Kopper's Dylite expanded polystyrene (EPS) foam. The larger Weberlite Go-Kooler 26 debuted in 1960 and Kopper Plastics promoted the availability of several Dylite coolers. In New Zealand, rubber products company Skellerup produced the "Chillybin" from Coolite EPS supplied by Hardie Rubber.

In 1960 Poloron Products offered the Supertherm chest made from its competing Vacucel polystyrene foam, followed in 1966 by hard-plastic Alpine chest coolers with Vacucel insulation, while the aluminum-bodied Thermaster range replaced fiberglass with Vacucel insulation. Texas Tennessee Industries had introduced its Igloo Fiesta 48 Qt plastic cooler in 1963 (US Patent Des. 196945). Coleman's Polylite No.5280 followed in 1968.

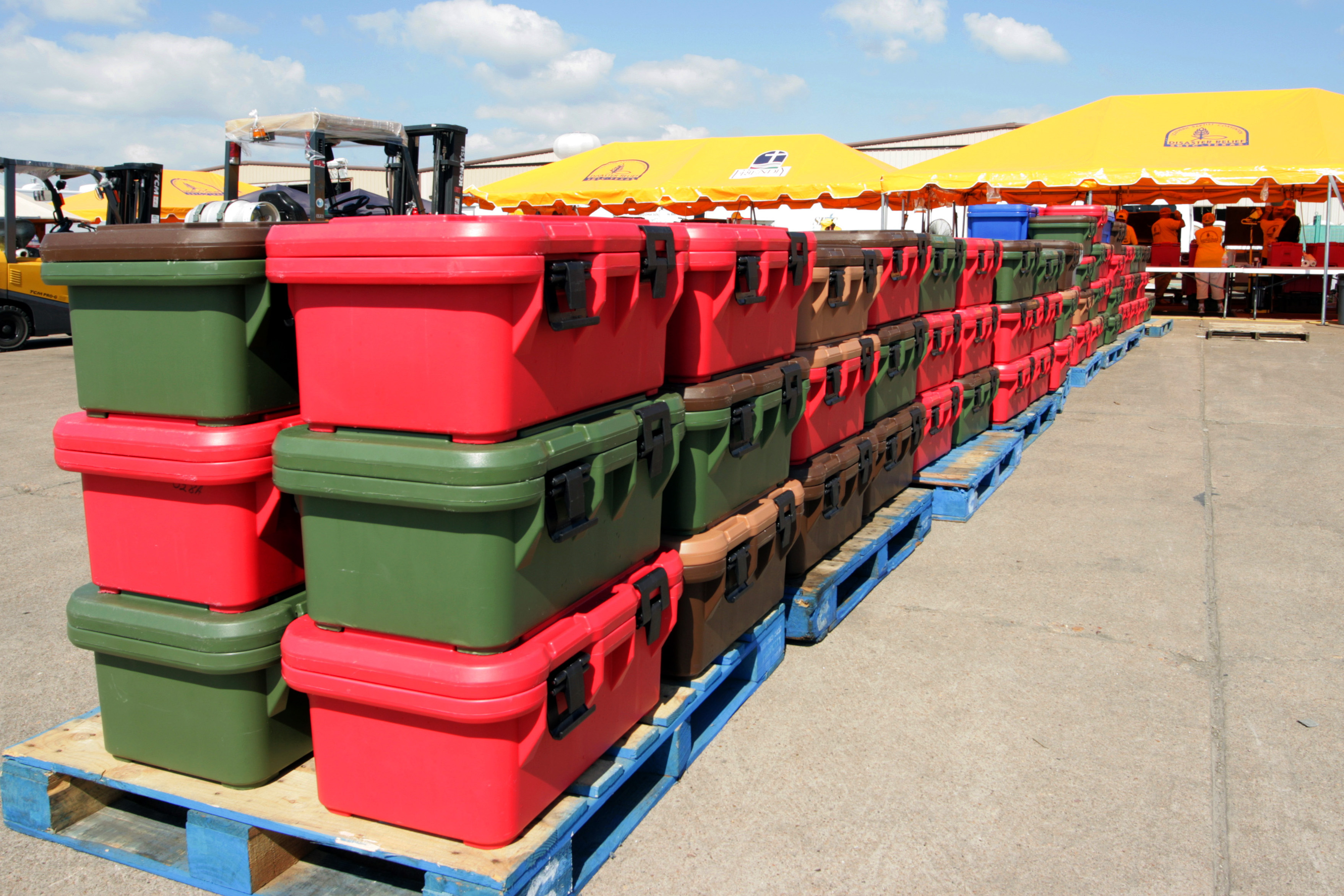
The United States Armed Forces and the Federal Emergency Management Agency have used cooler systems made by Cambro.

== Thermoelectric coolers ==
Some modern coolers are thermoelectric, plugging into a car's cigarette lighter socket. Rather than using a compressor and refrigerant such as a refrigerator or other heat pump, these use the Peltier effect along with an external fan to draw away the heat. By reversing the current, this concept can also heat the contents instead of cooling them, useful for keeping meals hot from a drive-through, or even to keep items from freezing in severely cold climates.

Thermoelectric coolers typically can drop the temperature by about 40 °F or 22 °C below ambient temperature, or can raise it by at least that much; this is a function of the effectiveness of the boxes' thermal insulation. Some better units even have digital thermostat controls. They do draw a significant amount of power, however, and can drain a non-running car's battery so much that it cannot start. It therefore may be advantageous to have a separate leisure battery if such coolers are regularly going to be used in a car. Most electric coolers have an undervoltage shutoff at around 10 or 10.5 volts to prevent this. Many come with power adapters, which use an electronic transformer to convert AC mains or line voltage down to 12 volts, with a lighter-like socket for the cooler's cord to plug in. Some also have a crossover-connection device to reverse the current for heating service.

== Rotationally molded coolers ==
Rotationally molded (roto-molded) coolers have become popular in recent years. Roto-molded coolers are manufactured using a process called rotational molding, a process by which a heated and softened material is applied to the inner wall of a slowly rotating mold. The mold continues to rotate during the cooling phase, producing a thick and uniform final product. In the case of roto-molded coolers, the heated liquid plastic is applied over a thick layer of insulation. The resulting product has no seals or imperfections and is much stronger and more durable than traditional coolers. Examples of roto-molded coolers include YETI, ORCA or Grizzly coolers.

== Ride-on coolers ==
A ride-on cooler is a means of transportation that can store and cool beverages and other food products. It is a combination of a low-power engine with a go-kart frame which uses the cooler as a seat. The ride-on cooler can transport food and drinks short distances and can be used in a small backyard, a neighborhood, or at large outdoor parties. The ride-on cooler can be equipped with a trailer hitch, allowing it to tow an extra cooler as a trailer.

Designs use either gas-powered lawnmower engines or electric motors which are lighter, more energy efficient, and quieter. Both can have a wide range of power. The electric motors range from 250 watts (0.3 hp) to 2,000 watts (2.7 hp) and generally use 12- to 60-volt batteries. Gas-powered engines range from 33 to 205 cubic centimetres (2.0 to 12.5 cu in) with a typical top speed of 13 miles per hour (21 km/h), but enthusiasts have built much faster versions.

The legal status of the ride-on cooler varies from country to country and in the US from state to state. In some jurisdictions, a driver's license is required to operate any form of motor vehicle on public roads, and an intoxicated driver can be convicted of driving under the influence for riding one.

== See also ==
- Insulated shipping container
- Beer koozie
- Vacuum flask (Thermos)
- Cellarette
- Coolgardie safe
- Icebox
