= Janne Sirén =

Finnish art historian

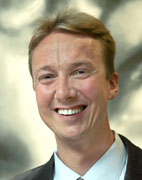
- Janne Sirén in 2009
- Born: September 29, 1970 (age 55); Helsinki, Finland
- Education: College of the Holy Cross (BA); New York University (MA, PhD)
- Occupation: Museum Director
- Organization: Buffalo AKG Art Museum
- Relatives: Akseli Gallen-Kallela (great-grandfather)

Janne Sirén (born 29 September 1970) is a Finnish art historian and the Peggy Pierce Elfvin Director of the Buffalo AKG Art Museum, formerly known as the Albright–Knox Art Gallery in Buffalo, New York. Before joining the Buffalo AKG Art Museum, Sirén served as Director and City of Helsinki Department Chief at the Helsinki Art Museum from 2007 to 2013. Prior to that, he served as Director of the Tampere Art Museum from 2004 to 2007.

== Early life and education ==
Sirén was born in Helsinki, Finland, the son of Aivi Gallen-Kallela and Matti Sirén. He is the great-grandson of Akseli Gallen-Kallela, a painter whose work is considered to be extremely important to Finnish national identity.

Sirén graduated from the College of the Holy Cross in Worcester, Massachusetts, with a Bachelor of Arts in art history, philosophy, and Italian in 1993. He then earned an M.A. and, in 2001, his Ph.D. from the New York University Institute of Fine Arts. There he wrote two qualifying papers—one in his major field titled “Intersecting Paths in the History of Modern European Painting: An Investigation of Edvard Munch’s Influence on Henri Matisse, 1895–1908,” and a second in his minor field titled “Melodies in Blue and White: Luca della Robbia at Santa Maria Impruneta and the Cultural Stance of Terracotta Invetriata in Quattrocento Florence.”

Sirén's doctoral dissertation, “Axel Gallén and the Constructed Nation: Art and Nationalism in Young Finland, 1880–1900,” discussed the role the work of his grandfather played in the construction of Finnish national identity. It was nominated by the Institute of Fine Arts Faculty Committee for New York University’s “Outstanding Dissertation of the Year” award. His dissertation advisor was pioneering feminist and post-colonialist art historian Linda Nochlin.

== Career ==
Sirén began his professional career in the Department of Art History at the Hebrew University of Jerusalem, where he was an assistant professor from 2000 to 2004. His teaching included courses on American and European art from the Renaissance to the present, aesthetics, critical theory, and museology.

In 2004, Sirén began his tenure as Director of the Tampere Art Museum in southern Finland. While there, he also served as deputy director of the Tampere Museums Department. In 2007, he left Tampere and accepted the position of Director and City of Helsinki Department Chief at the Helsinki Art Museum. The museum's collection comprises more than 9,000 works, nearly half of which are on display in public locations in and around Helsinki.

In 2013, Sirén returned to the United States and joined the Buffalo AKG Art Museum in Buffalo, New York, as Peggy Pierce Elfvin Director. He was preceded at the Buffalo AKG Art Museum by Louis Grachos, who was appointed the Ernest and Sarah Butler Executive Director and CEO of The Contemporary Austin in 2013. At the Albright-Knox, Sirén oversees a world-renowned collection of modern and contemporary art containing more than 7,000 artworks. He has curated or co-curated several major exhibitions, including Anselm Kiefer: Beyond Landscape (2013), Monet and the Impressionist Revolution, 1860–1910 (2015), and Picasso: The Artist and His Models (2016).

Sirén's tenure at the Buffalo AKG Art Museum has been defined by a massive campus expansion project entitled AK360. He oversaw all aspects of the project and spearheaded a $230 million capital campaign. Under his leadership, the Buffalo AKG Art Museum raised $125 million between June 2016 and March 2018, including a $42.5 million matching challenge from businessman and investor Jeffrey Gundlach, the largest single philanthropic gift in the history of Western New York. In November 2017, Gundlach announced a second AK360 matching challenge of $10 million for funds raised through November 2018.

== Personal life ==
Sirén lives in Buffalo, New York, with his wife Sonja, whom he met in Israel while she was pursuing her doctoral studies on security policy and human rights in Nordic countries. They have three children.

== Selected publications ==
- The Impressionist Revolution and the Advent of Abstract Art. Buffalo: Albright-Knox Art Gallery. 2016.
- Giving Up One’s Mark: Helen Frankenthaler in the 1960s and 1970s. Buffalo: Albright-Knox Art Gallery. 2014.
- Anselm Kiefer: Beyond Landscape. Buffalo: Albright-Knox Art Gallery. 2014.
- Painters of the Soul: Symbolism in France 1880-1910. Edited with an introductory essay by Janne Sirén, Jean-David Jumeau-Lafond, et al. Tampere Art Museum Publications. 2007.
- Envoys of Humanism: Italian Art Treasures from the Collection of the National Museum in Belgrade. Edited with an introductory essay by Janne Sirén, Tapani Pennanen, and Johanna Vakkari. Tampere Art Museum Publications. 2005.
- "Creative Helsinki: The Pursuit of Public Art," in Wilson Meet Wirkkala: The Story of Tapo Wirkkala Park Designed by Robert Wilson. Edited by Tuula Isohanni. Helsinki: Aalto ARTS Books. 2012. 44–51.
- "German Antisemitism and the Historiography of Modern Art: The Case of Julius Meier-Graefe, 1895-1904," in Jewish Dimension in Modern Visual Culture: Antisemitism, Assimilation, Affirmation. Edited by Rose-Carol Washton Long, Matthew Baigell, Milly Heyd. Waltham, Mass.: Brandeis University Press. 2010.
