= Marathon Asset Management =

American investment manager

Marathon Asset Management, LP
- Company type: Private
- Industry: Hedge fund, distressed securities, investment management
- Founded: 1998; 28 years ago
- Founders: Bruce Richards; Louis Hanover
- Headquarters: Bank of America Tower; New York City, United States
- Key people: Bruce Richards (CEO); Louis Hanover (CIO)
- Total assets: $24 billion
- Number of employees: 190+
- Website: marathonfund.com

Marathon Asset Management, LP is an American hedge fund focused on opportunistic investing in credit and fixed income markets globally. Marathon manages a investments principally focused on hedge funds, managed accounts, single-client funds and collateralized loan, and debt obligation vehicles.

== History ==
Marathon was formed in January 1998, as Marathon Asset Management, LLC, by managing members Bruce Richards and Louis Hanover who have over 25 years of investment experience in distressed and situational investing. In 2008, Marathon was reorganized as a Delaware limited partnership.

In August 2008, the firm relocated its headquarters to One Bryant Park, the world's most environmentally responsible high-rise office building and the first building of its size to achieve a top ranked Platinum Leadership in Energy and Environmental Design (LEED) certification from U.S. Green Building Council (USGBC).

On July 8, 2009, Marathon was selected by the U.S. Department of the Treasury to serve as one of eight firms to manage the Legacy Securities Public Private Investment Program (PPIP) Fund.

Marathon Asset Management was one of the companies accused of threatening to block the European attempt to save Greece from defaulting unless they are guaranteed a significant payout.

In June 2016, Blackstone Strategic Capital Holdings, part of The Blackstone Group, acquired a minority interest in Marathon Asset Management, LP.

In January 2026, Jersey-based private equity firm CVC Capital Partners agreed to acquire Marathon for up to $1.2 billion.

== Organisation ==
The firm is headquartered in New York City with investment offices in London and Singapore. Marathon is one of eight firms selected by the U.S. Department of the Treasury to manage the Legacy Securities Public Private Investment Program ("PPIP") Fund.

Founded in 1998, Marathon manages over $23 billion of capital and has approximately 190 employees. The firm is registered with the U.S. Securities and Exchange Commission (SEC) as an investment adviser under the Investment Advisers Act of 1940. In addition, Marathon is a member of the National Futures Association ("NFA") and is registered with the Commodity Futures Trading Commission ("CFTC") in the U.S., the Financial Services Authority ("FSA") in the UK, and is notice filed as an exempted fund manager with Monetary Authority of Singapore ("MAS") in Singapore.
