= A. Eugene Washington =

American physician

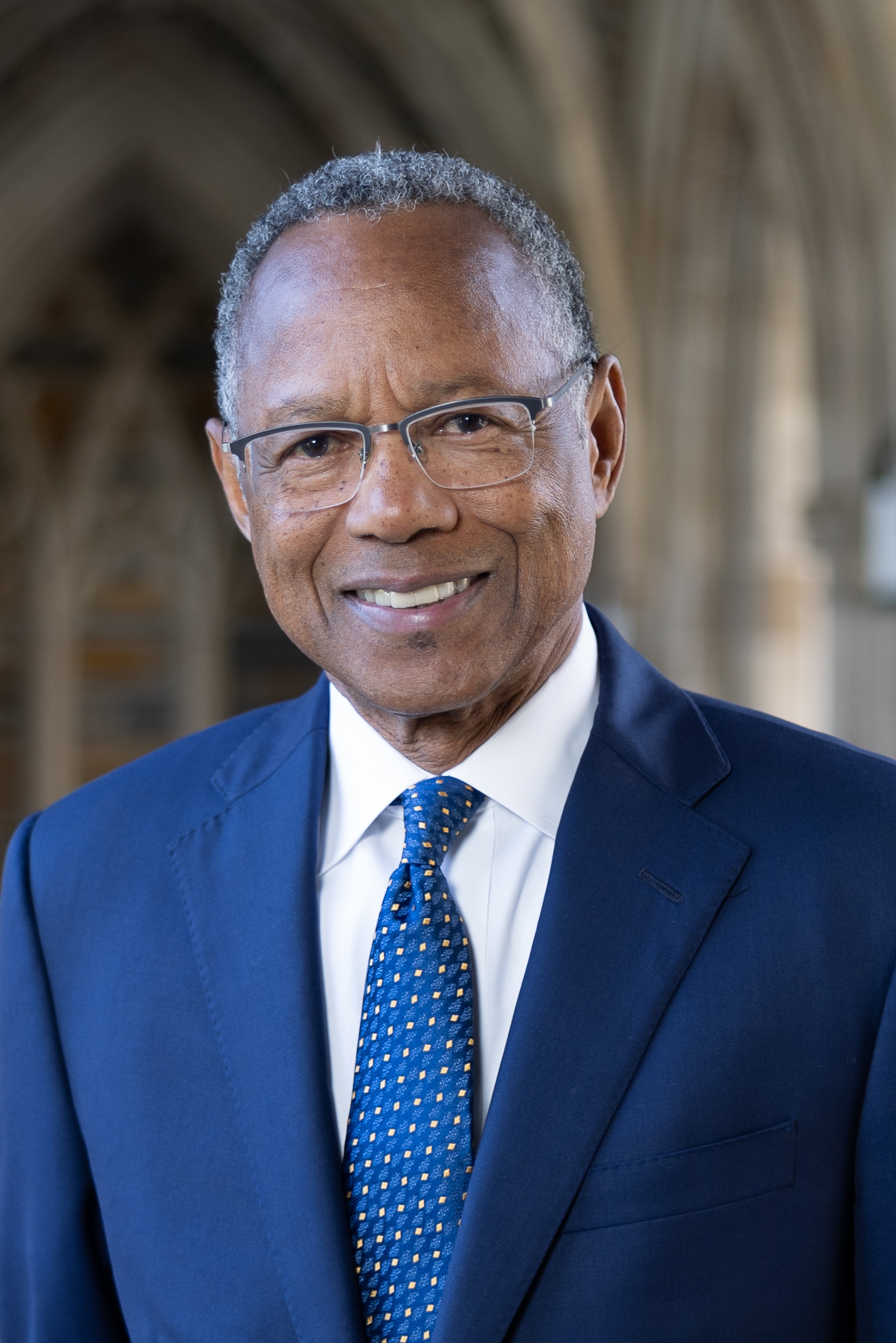
- Washington at Duke Chapel in 2023
- Born: 1950 (age 75–76); Houston, Texas, U.S.
- Education: University of California, San Francisco; University of California, Berkeley; Howard University; Harvard T.H. Chan School of Public Health
- Scientific career
- Workplaces: Duke University Health System; University of California, San Francisco; Stanford University

A. Eugene Washington (born 1951) is an American physician, clinical investigator, and administrator. He served as the chancellor for health affairs at Duke University, and the president and chief executive officer of the Duke University Health System, from 2015 to 2023. His research considers gynaecology, health disparities, and public health policy. He was elected to the National Academy of Medicine in 1997 and the American Academy of Arts and Sciences in 2014.

== Early life and education ==
Washington is from Houston. His father was a minister, his mother was a homemaker, and he was the youngest of five children. He grew up during segregation in the South of the United States.

Washington attended Howard University. He was a medical student at the University of California, San Francisco. He joined the medical school at UCSF as a medical student in 1972, before completing his residency at Stanford University. Washington earned a master's degree in medicine at the Harvard T.H. Chan School of Public Health in 1978. Washington was a graduate student at the University of California, Berkeley, where he earned a Master of Public Health.

== Research and career ==
After graduating, Washington joined the Centers for Disease Control and Prevention. His career in medicine and health policy began at the U.S. Public Health Service Hospital in New York. Washington completed a residency in Preventive Medicine at Harvard T.H. Chan School of Public Health in 1979.

=== University of California, San Francisco ===
In 1989 Washington joined the faculty at the University of California, San Francisco. In the same year, Washington co-led the creation of the Center for Reproductive Health Policy Research in the Institute for Health Policy Studies and the Department of Obstetrics, Gynecology, and Reproductive Sciences. In 1996, Washington became Chair of the Department of Obstetrics, Gynecology and Reproductive Sciences. In 1997 Washington was elected to the National Academy of Medicine, and later served on their governing council. He led several projects at UCSF, including the implementation of a ten-point diversity initiative. In 2002, he was honored with UCSF's Chancellor Award for Dr. Martin Luther King, Jr. Leadership, an award for "outstanding commitment and service to the ideals of diversity, equity, and inclusion". He established the Medical Effectiveness Research Centre for Diverse Populations, which looked to promote health and prevent disease in ethnically diverse populations. He worked with colleagues at Stanford University to lead an evidence-based practice centre. In 2004, Washington was appointed Executive Vice Chancellor and in 2006 became the university’s first Provost while continuing to serve as Executive Vice Chancellor. Washington worked at the UCSF School of Medicine until 2009.

=== UCLA Health ===
Washington was made vice chancellor and dean at the David Geffen School of Medicine at UCLA in 2009. There he worked as professor of gynaecology and health policy. In 2011, he was appointed chief executive officer of UCLA Health System.

=== Clinical Effectiveness Research and the Patient-Centered Outcomes Research Institute ===
Washington served as the founding chair of the board of governors of the Patient-Centered Outcomes Research Institute (PCORI), authorised by the Affordable Care Act to research clinical effectiveness. His research considered medical technologies and the translation of health research into policy. Washington oversaw the creation of policy guidelines on cervical cancer and prenatal genetics. He joined Johnson & Johnson as a director in 2012.

=== Duke University Health System ===
In 2015, Washington was appointed chancellor for health affairs at Duke University and president and CEO of the Duke University Health System. In the fall of 2016, Washington initiated Healthy Duke, a program to improve the health and wellness of Duke's students, faculty, and staff. Washington helped found the Duke Margolis Center for Health Policy. Washington stepped down from his executive roles at Duke University on June 30, 2023. Washington remained chancellor emeritus at Duke University.

Washington has been a member of the National Academy of Medicine since 1997 and the American Academy of Arts & Sciences since 2014, and a former member of the Scientific Management Review Board for the NIH. He was a Chair of the California Healthcare Foundation, and the California Wellness Foundation. He is a trustee of the Robert Wood Johnson Foundation.

== Awards and honors ==
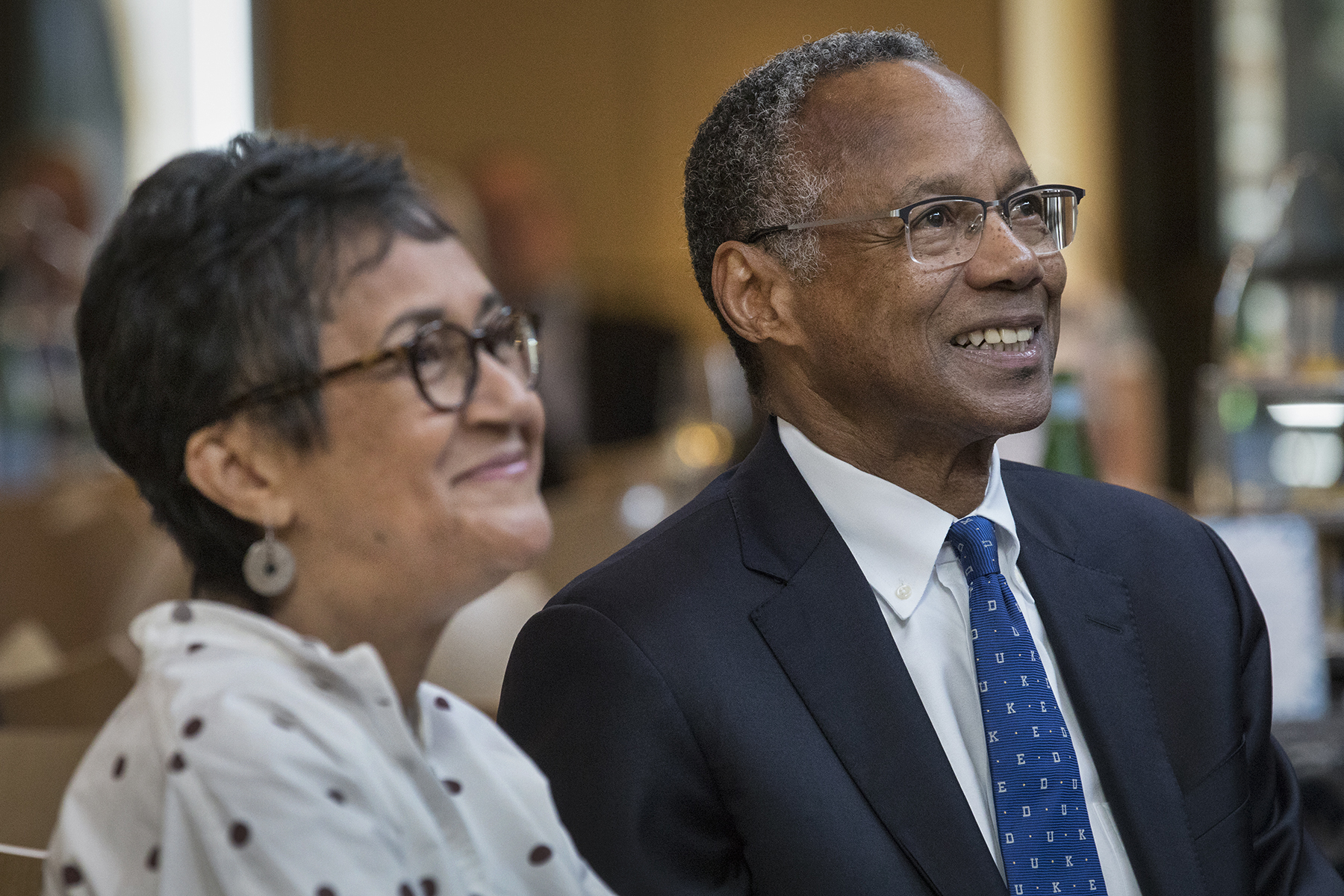
Washington received "The Order of the Longleaf Pine" award from state Senator Mike Woodard

Washington was awarded the Alumnus of the Year from the School of Medicine, University of California, San Francisco in 1999, and University of California, Berkeley, School of Public Health (2014). He was awarded the 2014 Association of American Medical Colleges David E. Rogers Award for his, "major contributions to improving the health and health care of the American people." That year he was also elected to the American Academy of Arts and Sciences.

Washington also received "The Order of the Longleaf Pine" from state Senator Mike Woodard, the UCSF medal in 2018, and Alumni Award of Merit, Harvard T.H. Chan School of Public Health in 2019. Washington is an Honorary Doctor of Science, Howard University in 2023.

The Patient-Centered Outcomes Research Institute (PCORI) award 'Eugene Washington' legacy prizes each year, which distribute up to $25 million ($250,000 per award) in recognition of Washington's efforts.

== Personal life ==
Washington is married to Marie Washington, with whom he has three children.

== Selected publications ==
- Washington, A. Eugene; Coye, Molly J.; Boulware, L. Ebony (February 2, 2016). "Academic Health Systems' Third Curve". JAMA. 315 (5): 459–460. doi:10.1001/jama.2015.18550. ISSN 0098-7484. PMID 26836726.
- Washington, A. Eugene; Lipstein, Steven H. (October 13, 2011). "The Patient-Centered Outcomes Research Institute — Promoting Better Information, Decisions, and Health". New England Journal of Medicine. 365 (15): e31. doi:10.1056/nejmp1109407. ISSN 0028-4793. PMID 21992473.
- Kuppermann, Miriam; Learman, Lee A.; Gates, Elena; Gregorich, Steven E.; Nease, Robert F.; Lewis, James; Washington, A Eugene (2006). "Beyond Race or Ethnicity and Socioeconomic Status". Obstetrics & Gynecology. 107 (5): 1087–1097. doi:10.1097/01.aog.0000214953.90248.db. ISSN 0029-7844. PMID 16648415.
- Ostrove, Joan M.; Adler, Nancy E.; Kuppermann, Miriam; Washington, A. Eugene (2000). "Objective and subjective assessments of socioeconomic status and their relationship to self-rated health in an ethnically diverse sample of pregnant women". Health Psychology. 19 (6): 613–618. doi:10.1037/0278-6133.19.6.613. ISSN 0278-6133. PMID 11129365.
- Washington, A. E. (April 4, 1986). "The economic cost of pelvic inflammatory disease". JAMA: The Journal of the American Medical Association. 255 (13): 1735–1738. doi:10.1001/jama.255.13.1735. ISSN 0098-7484. PMID 3951103.
