= Mosaic Brands =

Former Australian fashion retail company

Mosaic Brands Limited
- Formerly: Noni B Limited
- Type: Public
- Traded as: ASX: MOZ
- Industry: Retail
- Founded: 1977; 49 years ago
- Founder: Alan Kindl
- Defunct: April 2025
- Fate: Voluntary administration in October 2024; All stores shut down by receivers January–April 2025: Closed 5 brands in an attempted self-restructure (see footnotes); Forced into receivership after failing to gain the certainty of all creditors; Closed Katies and some stores, then Rivers, then all brands and stores after failing to find a buyer
- Headquarters: Rosebery, Sydney, New South Wales, Australia
- Number of locations: ▼0 stores (~April 2025) ▼Approx. 350 stores (January–February 2025) ▼715 stores (September 2024)
- Key people: Erica Berchtold (CEO)
- Products: Women's clothing
- Brands: Former: La Voca (Note: Closed by the original company and phased out to Noni B.); EziBuy (Note: Closed after the company placed it into administration.); Rockmans (Note: Eliminated by the company as a rescue plan shortly before it collapsed from the plan being denied.); Autograph; Crossroads; W. Lane; Beme; Katies (Note: Later eliminated by receivers and managers after failing to find a buyer for it.); Rivers; Millers (Note: Eliminated by receivers and managers as part of the total liquidation of Mosaic Brands after failing to find a buyer.); Noni B

Mosaic Brands Limited, formerly known as Noni B Limited was an Australian fashion retail company. It operated 715 stores across Australia under the brands Millers, Rockmans, Noni B, Rivers, Katies, Autograph, Crossroads, W. Lane and Beme, most of which got from acquisitions namely of the portfolio of City Chic Collective. The company's core market was women over the age of 50.

In 2024 it was placed into voluntary administration with administrators appointed from FTI Consulting and receivers and managers from KPMG after not gaining approval on an emergency restructure. It announced it would wind down the Rockmans, Autograph, Crossroads, W.Lane and Beme brands, with receivers later winding down the Katies brand as part of extended store closures, followed by the Rivers brand. It then announced that Mosaic Brands would be placed into effective total liquidation with the permanent closure of remaining brands Millers and Noni B. All remaining stores would have closed around late April, and their websites went offline on 16 March, after the sale of any of the brands was reportedly unsuccessful.

Secured creditors are reported to able to be paid in full, with the government fast-tracking employees, with uncertainty and possible legal proceedings for other creditors.

== History ==
Mosaic Brands began as Noni B, a store in Belmont, New South Wales founded by Noni Broadbent. Blacktown Croatian refugee Alan Kindl had been a stockfeed chemist and was seeking a career change. When the opportunity came up in 1977, Kindl partnered with a friend to buy the fashion boutique and another store nearby.

By 1989, there were 38 Noni B stores in New South Wales and Victoria. Kindl's friend wanted to leave the business so Kindl purchased his stake in the company for $1.2 million. In 2000, Noni B listed on the Australian Securities Exchange.

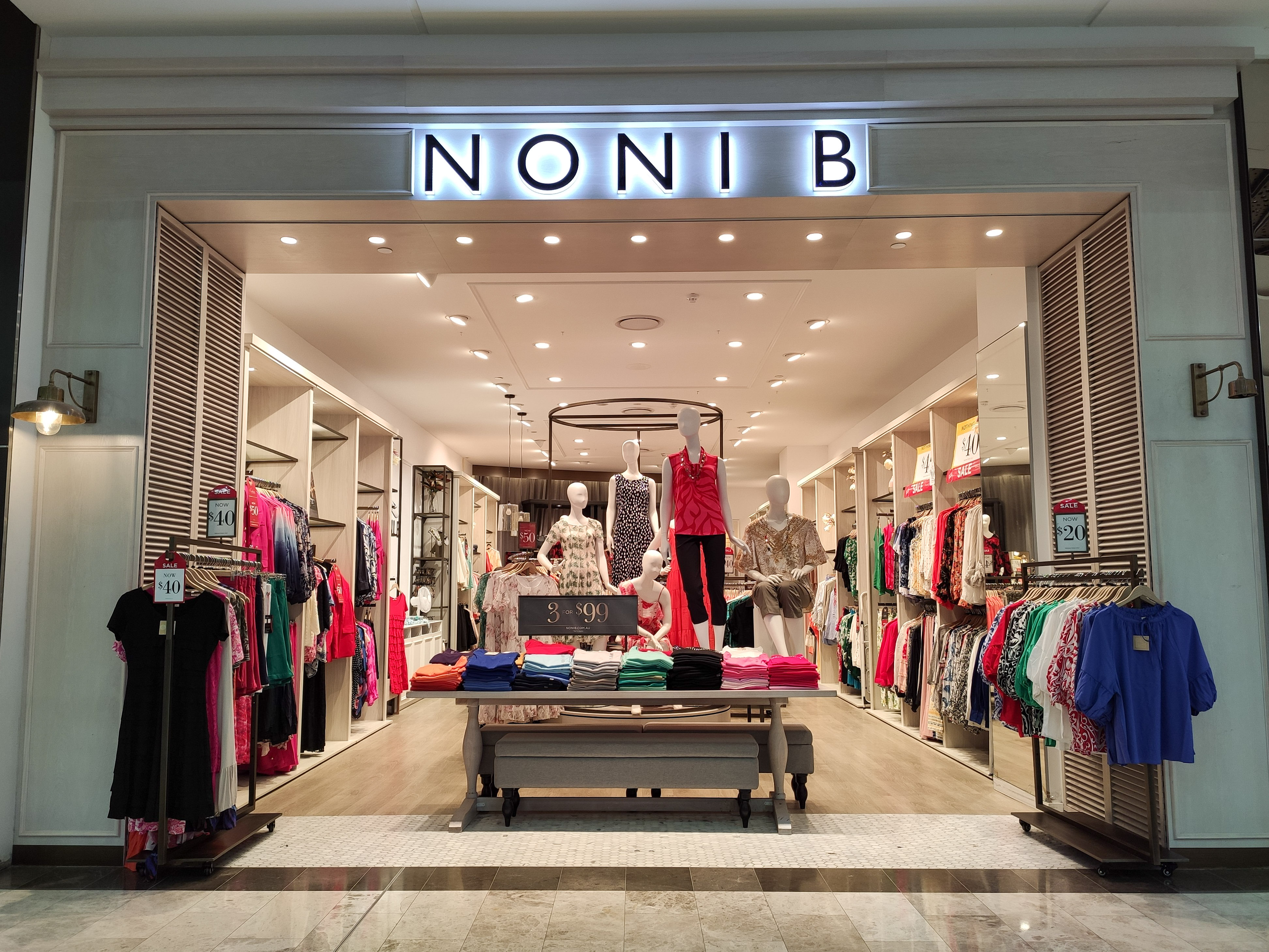
Noni B store in Westfield Carousel

In 2003, Noni established Liz Jordan, a new brand aimed at younger, more upmarket customers. Liz Jordan products were sold in dedicated stores and in many Noni B stores. Although Noni B planned on moving upmarket with Liz Jordan, its products struggled to command higher prices because they were sold in Noni B stores. In August 2006, Noni B launched a new concept called La Voca, aimed at a similar demographic to Liz Jordan but with greater separation from Noni B. At the same time, the company closed its Liz Jordan stores, rebranding them as Noni B or La Voca stores. Liz Jordan products continued to be sold in Noni B stores. In June 2008, Noni shut down the loss making La Voca venture. About half of the 19 La Voca stores were rebranded to Noni B stores.

In September 2014, private investment firm Alceon Group attempted a takeover of Noni B. The Kindl family sold their 42 per cent stake in Noni B to the firm. However, Alceon was blocked from taking the company private when Gannet Capital acquired a 12 per cent stake in Noni B. In November 2014, Scott Evans was appointed CEO of Noni B. In December 2014, Noni B bought two brands—Queenspark and Events—for $675,000.

=== Growth ===
In August 2016, the company purchased Pretty Girl Fashion Group from Consolidated Press Holdings for at least $75 million in cash and shares. Pretty Girl Fashion Group had around 370 stores under the brands Table Eight, Rockmans, BeMe, and W. Lane. In July 2018, Noni B purchased five brands—Autograph, Crossroads, Katies, Millers and Rivers—from Specialty Fashion Group for $31 million.

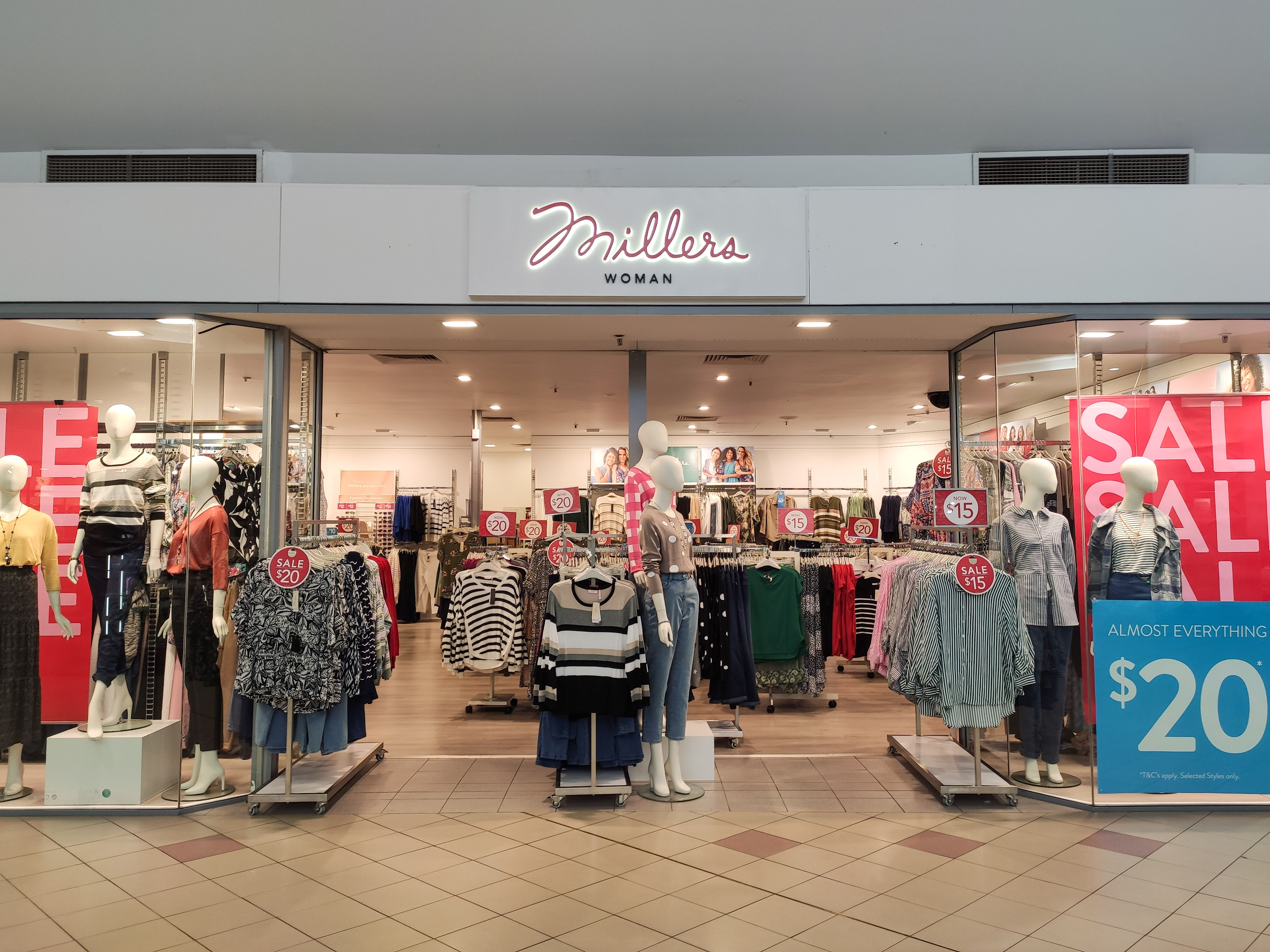
Millers store in Maddington Central

In November 2019, Noni B purchased a 50.1 per cent stake in New Zealand multi-channel retailer EziBuy from Alceon Group in a $1 peppercorn sale. That month, Noni B Limited also changed its name to Mosaic Brands.

=== Decline and non-compliance ===
The onset of the COVID-19 pandemic in Australia led Mosaic to temporarily close its 1379 stores and stand down 6800 staff in March 2020. Between the start of the pandemic and September 2021, the company closed 288 stores. The company announced a $32 million capital raise in September 2021 to help it stay afloat until pandemic restrictions eased.

In May 2021, the company was fined $630,000 by the Australian Competition and Consumer Commission (ACCC) for making false or misleading claims pertaining to hand sanitiser and face mask products. The company was also fined $266,400 in September 2022 for false claims regarding two other products. Mosaic Brands said the two products were from "third-party sellers" and "neither product was ever purchased by a customer".

Mosaic purchased the remaining 49.9 per cent stake in EziBuy in October 2021 for $11 million. In April 2023, Mosaic placed EziBuy into administration, with plans to restructure it. With this the remaining stores were closed down and the retailer went online only. The brand entered liquidation in July 2023 with creditors owed more than $100 million.

In May 2023, Mosaic was fined $29,000 after it pleaded guilty to 324 offences of underpaying long service to workers. The court found that while the underpayments were not deliberate, they occurred due to a lack of care and diligence.

Erica Berchtold was appointed CEO of Mosaic Brands in February 2024. The following month, the ACCC brought proceedings against the company for allegedly making false or misleading representations to consumers about delivery timeframes and their rights regarding refunds for faulty products.

=== Rescue plan and receivership ===
In September 2024, the company announced it would wind down its Rockmans, Autograph, Crossroads, W.Lane and Beme brands. The company had previously begun closing or centralising stores, mostly in rural areas. In late October 2024, Mosaic Brands was placed into voluntary administration, after failing to convince all stakeholders of the restructure, principally the senior lender, and citing reduced spending, structural complexity and massive debts to suppliers. The company appointed administrators from FTI Consulting, with KPMG appointed receivers and managers by the creditor. The company started focusing on the timely holiday period and slashed prices while preparing for a creditors' meeting.

The creditors' meeting revealed an estimate of $240 million in debt from a laundry list of creditors, but the true extent was not disclosed and some debts overlapped. A sale process began, with a dozen interested parties and hints at breakups and resumed store closures, staving off a complete receivership and shutdown. The receivership also left Bangladeshi suppliers out of pocket and owing unpaid wages, and brought shame on the industry from Oxfam and the Bangladesh Garment Manufacturers and Exporters Association with accusations of exploitation, inadvertent free labour, and fears of seamstresses going hungry. Administrators tried to assure creditors that entitlements would be paid in full, despite the receivership (which usually prioritises the appointee) and heavy debt.

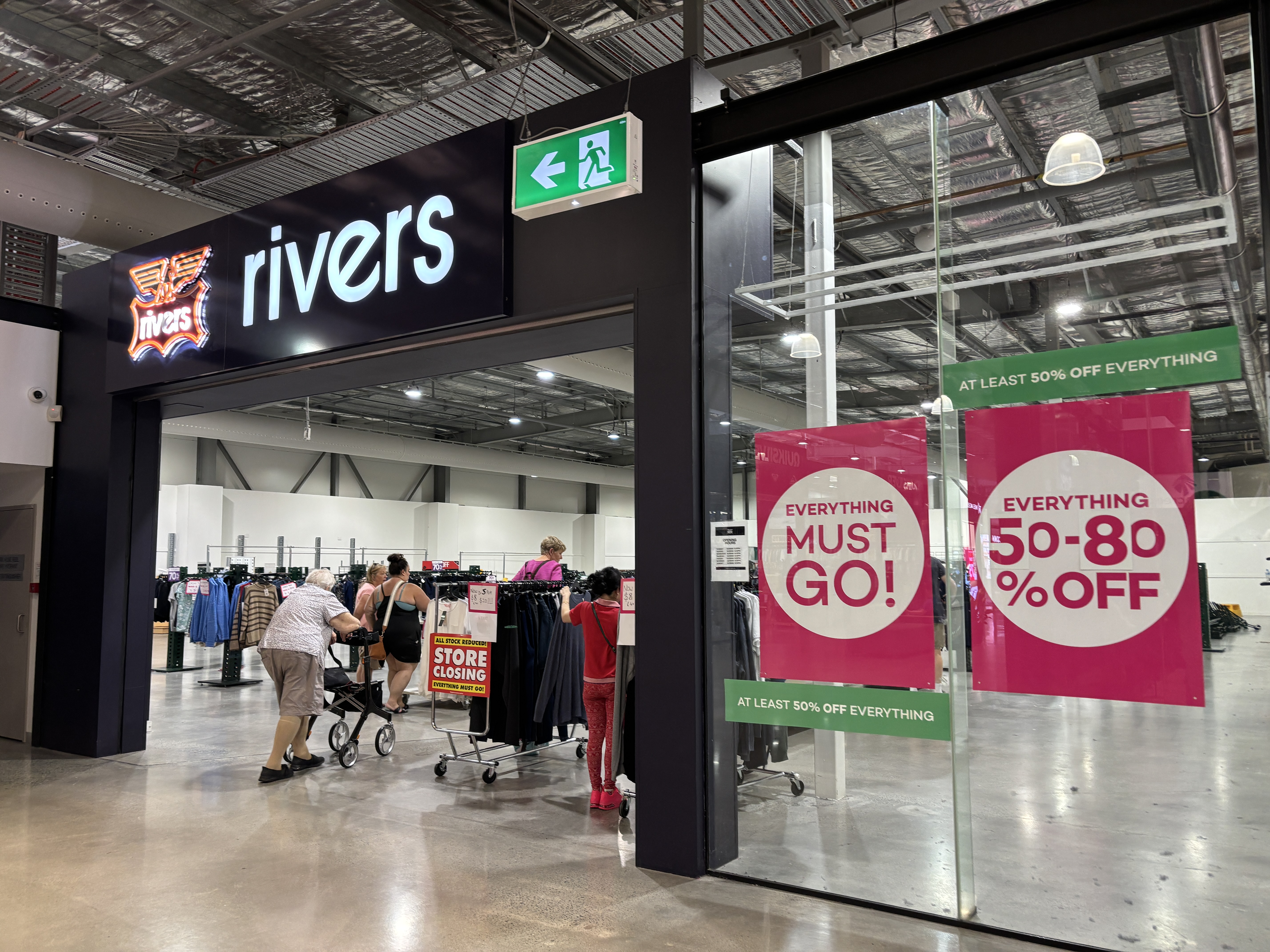
A Rivers store in Canberra during its closing sale in January 2025

Administrators allege the company may have been under safe harbour as early as late 2022. It was pressured to disclose that the company was under safe harbour in August 2024.

On 10 December, receivers announced that the entire Katies brand and an additional combined 80 Millers, Rivers and Noni B stores would be closed down by mid-January 2025, affecting 480 employees. It comes after receivers weeded out remaining underperforming stores and buyers saw the Katies brand as an 'uneconomical' blight that would 'present difficulties' for them. Administrators have been meanwhile trying to sell the group, with the deadline extended from 13 December to the end of December 2024.

On 23 January, whilst aforementioned store closures started to slowly take effect store-by-store, receivers announced that Rivers and all its 136 stores would close down by mid-April affecting another 650 employees, after also failing to find a buyer for the company.

=== Liquidation ===
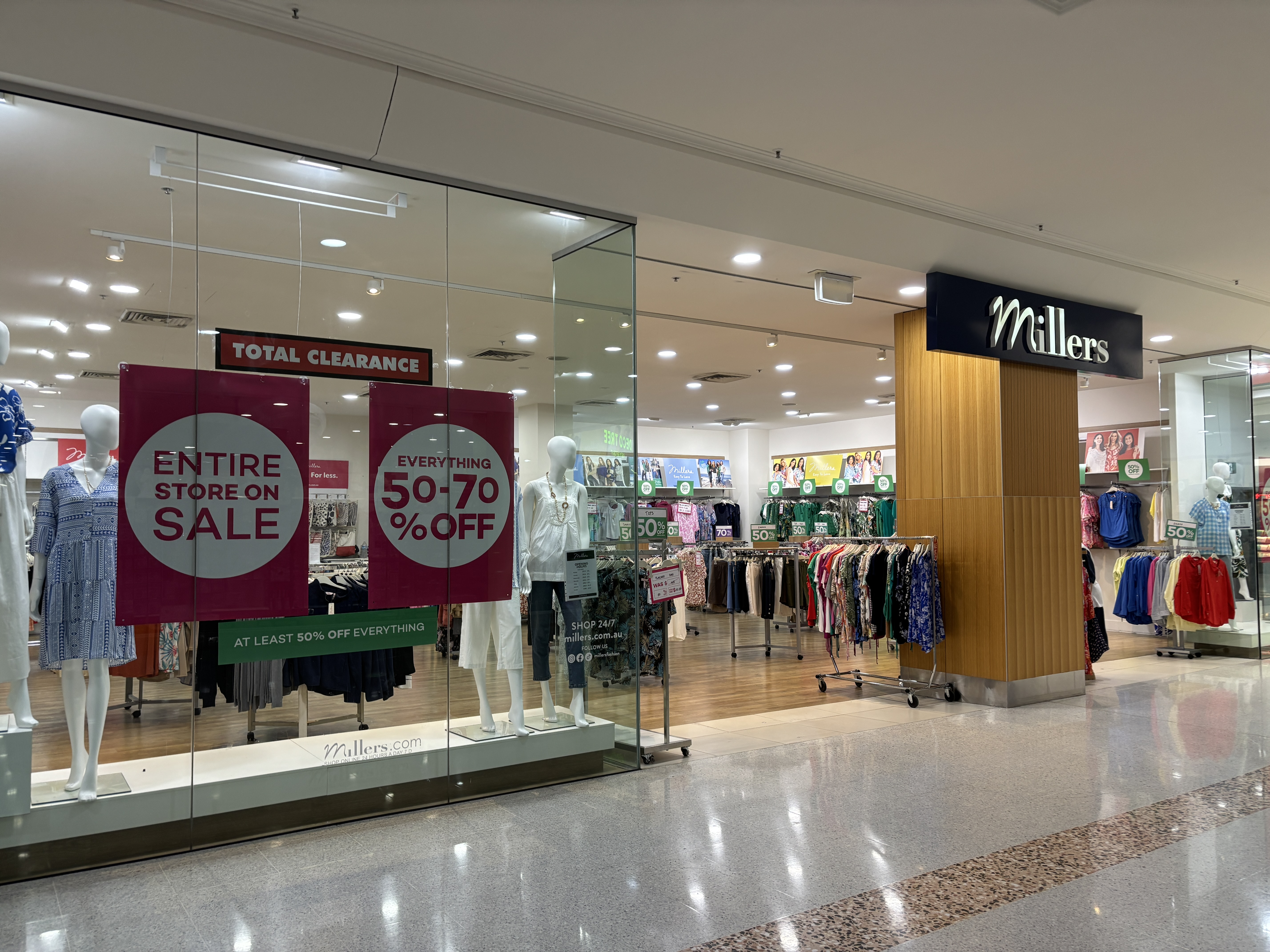
A Millers store in Canberra during its closing down sale in February 2025

On 29 January, receivers announced that remaining Mosaic Brands retailers Millers and Noni B would cease operations, effectively placing Mosaic Brands into total liquidation. All remaining 252 stores across both brands will also permanently close by mid-April alongside Rivers, and will result in the loss of another 933 employees, after the search for a buyer failed.

Administrators weren't drawn on how what ended up being a 'complete' receivership will affect the payment of creditors, particularly the unpaid factory workers, saying they will do some final investigations and hold a creditors meeting in May 2025. On 28 February, the federal government announced they will fast track workers entitlements owed by the company. The company was later also referred to the Australian Securities and Investment Commission by out of pocket suppliers for alleged misconduct. ASIC says they may pursue legal action but there is no evidence to suggest any wrongdoing at the moment.

Final debt tallies were reported to be over $318 million, with $76 million owed wages and loans to be paid but uncertainty about the rest. It was also reported that prospective buyers were unsure about "historical indebtedness" and lack of new supplies and a future for the brands. Jason Andrew from SmartCompany blames a convoluted, aggressive expansion strategy of Noni B that disregarded suppliers, acquired already-struggling chains at bargain prices, "stretched [the company] thin", and came to a head during the pandemic for the total collapse of the company, suggesting the company may have been financially troubled since all the way back in 2000, and also suggesting other factors such as the brands being very similar and targeting the exact same aging demographic with no pull from younger ones. It was reported that the acquisition of Specialty Fashion Group was purported as a strategic turnaround point in the company, only for the pandemic to occur shortly after and cause a near-collapse of the company, and the acquisition to contribute to the total collapse of the company.
