= Jeffrey Gundlach =

American bond trader (born 1959)

- Born: Jeffrey Edward Gundlach; October 30, 1959 (age 67); Amherst, New York, U.S.
- Education: Dartmouth College; Yale University
- Occupations: Businessman, investor, philanthropist
- Employer: DoubleLine Capital
- Spouse: Nancy Draper (div.)

Jeffrey Edward Gundlach (born October 30, 1959) is an American businessman, investor, and philanthropist. He is the founder of DoubleLine Capital, an investment firm.

== Early life ==
Jeffrey Gundlach was born October 30, 1959, in Amherst, New York, to parents Carol and Arthur Gundlach. His father (d. 2013) was a chemist for Pierce and Stevens Chemical Corp. He is a graduate of Dartmouth College where he graduated summa cum laude in math and philosophy in 1981, and attended Yale University for a Ph.D. in mathematics before dropping out.

== Career ==
Gundlach was formerly the head of the $9.3 billion TCW Total Return Bond Fund, where he finished in the top 2% of all funds invested in intermediate-term bonds for the 10 years that ended prior to his departure. He was fired by TCW in 2009. In the aftermath, Gundlach and TCW sued each other and went to jury trial in California; TCW alleged that Gundlach stole trade secrets (TCW prevailed, but was awarded $0 for the claim), Gundlach sued over compensation claims (Gundlach prevailed, and was awarded $66.7 Million).

=== DoubleLine Capital ===
In 2009, shortly after his firing from TCW, Gundlach founded Doubleline, along with Philip Barach and 14 other members of Gundlach's senior staff from TCW. Barach was Gundlach's co-manager of the $12 Billion TCW Total Return bond fund. In a February 2011 cover story, Barron's called him the "King of Bonds".

On March 9, 2011, Gundlach was quoted on CNBC that "Munis Are The New Subprime." Referring to municipal bonds, he said: "You’ve got a history of low defaults, which is comforting. But that kind of sounds like what subprime sounded like back in 2006". Gundlach pointed out that even if defaults do not ultimately climb as high as critics like Meredith Whitney have warned, muni bonds will likely trade much lower. "Between here and the end game, lies the valley. And the valley is full of fear. I think the muni market is going to go down by at least, on the long end, something like 15 and 20 percent," he said.

On March 10, 2011, Gundlach reportedly liquidated 55 percent of his personal holdings in municipal bonds. At the time, Gundlach also stated: "Nobody owns California general obligation bonds because they think it's an improving credit story," he said, drawing chuckles from the audience.

In 2012, he was included in the 50 Most Influential list of Bloomberg Markets magazine.

=== Negative on the US Dollar ===
On 11 November 2020, Gundlach remarked in an interview with Real Vision that he "was previously positive on the US dollar for six to seven years until he turned negative on the US dollar since January 2017." He was quoted on CNBC, that the "dollar is doomed" and "ultimately, the size of our deficits – both trade deficits which has exploded post-pandemic and the budget deficit, which is obviously, completely off the charts – suggest that in the intermediate term — I don’t really think this year, exactly, but in the intermediate term — the dollar is going to fall pretty substantially." He further re-affirms this by stating "In the long term, I think the dollar .... [is] doomed."

Following the Federal Reserve's September 2026 decision to raise its benchmark interest rate by 0.25 percentage point, Gundlach said he would have preferred a 0.50 percentage point increase. He also expressed concern that the U.S. inflation problem was not being fully accounted for.

== Personal life ==
He was married to Nancy Draper, a bassist in his former band, "Radical Flat" (previously known as "The Greens), who filed for divorce from Gundlach in 2010 after being married for more than 20 years. He currently lives in Los Angeles, California.

=== Home burglary and recovery of art ===
Gundlach's Santa Monica home was burgled in his absence in September 2012. Several pieces of art were taken along with some wine, five designer watches, cash and a prized 2010 red Porsche Carrera 4S. Some days after the theft, Gundlach added to a $200,000 "overall" reward a $1 million reward for the Piet Mondrian painting among the missing, and a $500,000 reward for the Jasper Johns. The total value of the stolen property was put at $10 million at the time. Within weeks, a tip led to the recovery of the art works and arrests of suspects in the theft. The rewards—with the one for the Mondrian being termed a record for a single art work—were being said to have played a role in the recovery though no determination of payment had been made. The Porsche was still missing.

=== Philanthropy ===
In 2016, Gundlach donated $42.5 million to Albright–Knox Art Gallery in Buffalo, New York, as part of their capital campaign and expansion project. The gift represents the city’s largest cultural gift from an individual, according to museum director Janne Sirén. The Gallery was renamed the Buffalo Albright-Knox-Gundlach Art Museum, or Buffalo AKG Art Museum for short.
