= Public–Private Investment Program for Legacy Assets =

US financial program

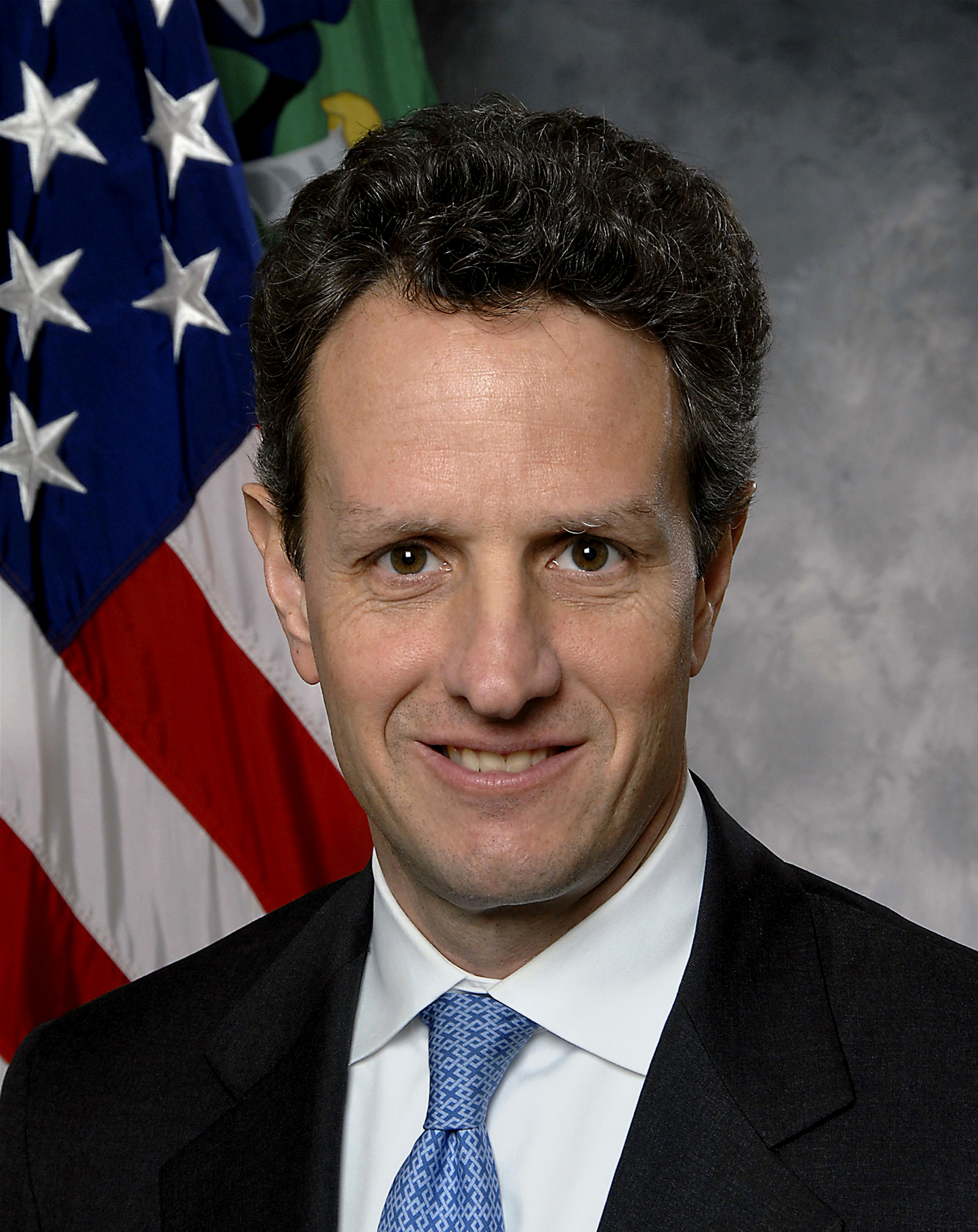
Timothy Geithner

The Public–Private Investment Program for Legacy Assets was a financial program announced on March 23, 2009 by the United States Federal Deposit Insurance Corporation (FDIC), the Federal Reserve, and the United States Treasury Department, designed to provide liquidity for "toxic assets" on the balance sheets of financial institutions. It was one of the initiatives under the Troubled Asset Relief Program (TARP), as implemented by the then US Treasury under-secretary Timothy Geithner.

The major stock market indices in the United States rallied on the day of the announcement, rising by over six percent, with shares of bank stocks rising most. The Legacy Securities Program implemented by the Federal Reserve had begun by the fall of 2009 but the Legacy Loans Program was never implemented. When rolled out, the size of the program was drastically reduced relative to its original proposed size.

== Operation ==
Using $75 to $100 billion in TARP capital and capital from private investors, the Public–Private Investment Program (P-PIP) was expected to generate $500 billion in purchasing power to buy legacy assets, with the potential to expand to $1 trillion over time. The P-PIP was designed around 3 basic principles:

1. Maximizing the use of taxpayer funds: by using government financing in partnership with the FDIC and Federal Reserve and co-investment with private sector investors, substantial purchasing power would be created, making the most of taxpayer resources.
2. Shared risk and profits with private sector participants: the P-PIP ensures that private sector participants invest alongside the taxpayer, with the private sector investors standing to lose their entire investment in a downside scenario and the taxpayer sharing in profitable returns.
3. Private sector price discovery: to reduce the likelihood that the government would overpay for these assets, private sector investors competing with one another established the price of the loans and securities purchased under the program.

P-PIP used a combination of private equity and Government equity and debt through TARP to facilitate purchases of legacy mortgage-backed securities ("MBS") held by financial institutions. In July 2009 Treasury announced the selection of nine Public–Private Investment Fund ("P-PIF") managers. Treasury has obligated $21.9 billion in TARP funds to the program. In January 2010, P-PIP manager The TCW Group Inc. ("TCW") withdrew from the program. On April 3, 2012, P-PIP manager Invesco announced it had sold all remaining securities in its portfolio and was in the process of winding up the fund. At that time the remaining seven P-PIP managers were purchasing investments and managing their portfolios.

According to Treasury the purpose of the P-PIP is to purchase legacy securities through P-PIFs from banks, insurance companies, mutual funds, pension funds, and other eligible financial institutions as defined in EESA. P-PIFs are partnerships formed specifically for this program that invest in mortgage-backed securities using equity capital from private-sector investors, combined with TARP equity and debt. A private-sector fund management firm oversees each P-PIF on behalf of these investors. According to Treasury the aim of P-PIP was to "restart the market for legacy securities, allowing banks and other financial institutions to free up capital and stimulate the extension of new credit". P-PIP originally included a Legacy Loans subprogram that would have involved purchases of troubled legacy loans with private and Treasury equity capital, as well as an FDIC guarantee for debt financing, but TARP funds were never disbursed for this subprogram.

Private investors and Treasury co-invested in the P-PIFs to purchase legacy securities from financial institutions. The fund managers raised private-sector capital and Treasury matched the private-sector equity dollar-for-dollar and provided debt financing in the amount of the total combined equity. Each P-PIP manager was also required to invest at least $20 million of its own money in the P-PIF, making each P-PIF approximately 75% TARP funded. P-PIP was designed as an eight-year program and P-PIP managers had until 2017 to sell the assets in their portfolio. Under certain circumstances Treasury could terminate the plan early or extend it for up to two additional years.

Treasury, the P-PIP managers, and the private investors share P-PIF profits and losses on a pro rata basis based on their limited partnership interests. Treasury also received warrants in each P-PIF that gave Treasury the right to receive a portion of the fund's profits that would otherwise be distributed to the private investors along with its pro rata share of program proceeds.

The P-PIP portfolio, consisting of eligible securities, was valued at $21.1 billion as of March 31, 2012, according to a process administered by Bank of New York Mellon, acting as valuation agent. That was $600 million higher than the portfolio value at the end of the previous quarter. The portfolio value was also affected by Invesco's sale of its remaining securities in March 2012. In addition to the eligible securities, the P-PIP portfolio also consisted of cash assets to be used to purchase securities. The securities eligible for purchase by P-PIFs ("eligible assets") were non-agency residential mortgage-backed securities ("non-agency RMBS") and commercial mortgage-backed securities ("CMBS") that met the following criteria:

- Issued before January 1, 2009 (legacy);
- Rated when issued AAA or equivalent by two or more credit rating agencies designated as nationally recognized statistical rating organizations ("NRSROs");
- Secured directly by actual mortgages, leases, or other assets, not other securities (other than certain swap positions, as determined by Treasury);
- Located primarily in the United States (the loans and other assets that secure the non-agency RMBS and CMBS);
- Purchased from financial institutions that are eligible for TARP participation.

== Criticism ==
Economist and Nobel Prize winner Paul Krugman was critical of the program, arguing that the non-recourse loans led to a hidden subsidy that could be split by asset managers, bank shareholders, and creditors. Mr. Krugman argued that this would lead to wild overbidding for assets. However, research into the structure of the program showed that the overbidding incentives in non-recourse loans were subtle. If there were overbidding incentives, they depended on the amount of leverage, the interest rates, and guarantee fees charged by the Federal Reserve or the FDIC respectively, and the volatility of the toxic assets.

Banking analyst Meridith Whitney argued that banks would not sell bad assets at fair market values because they are reluctant to take asset write downs. Removing toxic assets would also reduce the volatility of banks' stock prices. Because stock is a call option on a firm's assets, this lost volatility will hurt the stock price of distressed banks. Therefore such banks will only sell toxic assets at above market prices.

The program was hampered by the announcement by the rating agency Standard & Poor's that many eligible assets would be downgraded, making them ineligible for the program. Federal Reserve of New York president William Dudley stated on June 4, 2009 that "there's a huge administrative hurdle" to implementing the program.
