= Alceon Group =

Australian private investment firm

- Industry: Venture capital, investments
- Founded: 2010; 16 years ago
- Founders: Trevor Loewensohn; Phil Green
- Headquarters: Sydney, Australia
- Area served: Worldwide
- Key people: Richard Facioni (Executive Directior)
- Website: www.alceon.com.au

Alceon Group is an Australian venture capital, private equity and investment firm. The company was established in 2010 by Trevor Loewensohn and Phil Green.

The company owns Decor Corporation, founded in Melbourne in 1958. It also acquired Marlin Brands in 2017, and Willow Ware Australia, founded in Melbourne in 1887.

== Portfolio ==
=== Marlin Brands ===
Alceon Group owns 50% of Marlin Brands with Oaktree Capital Management.

- Zanui – Homewares stores
- Decor – Food storage containers, brushware and mops
- Reva – Pegs
- Starmaid – Document storage
- Willow – BBQ needs, document storage

=== Mosaic Brands ===
In September 2014, Alceon Group attempted a takeover of womenswear retailer Noni B (later renamed Mosaic Brands). However, Alceon was blocked from taking the company private when Gannet Capital acquired a 12 per cent stake in Noni B. Alceon Group owns 36% of Mosaic Brands.

== Willow Ware ==
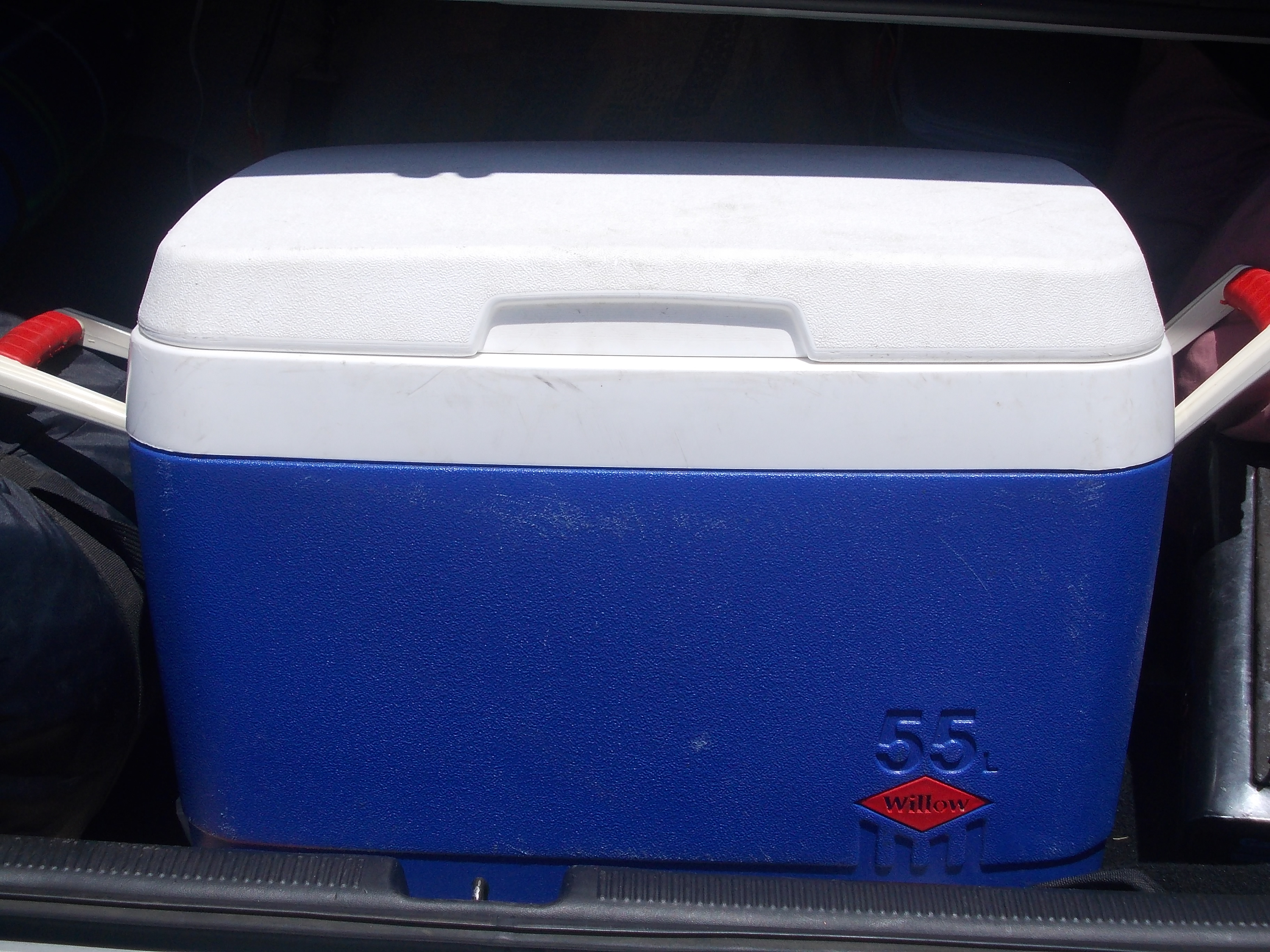
Moulded plastic drink cooler by Willow

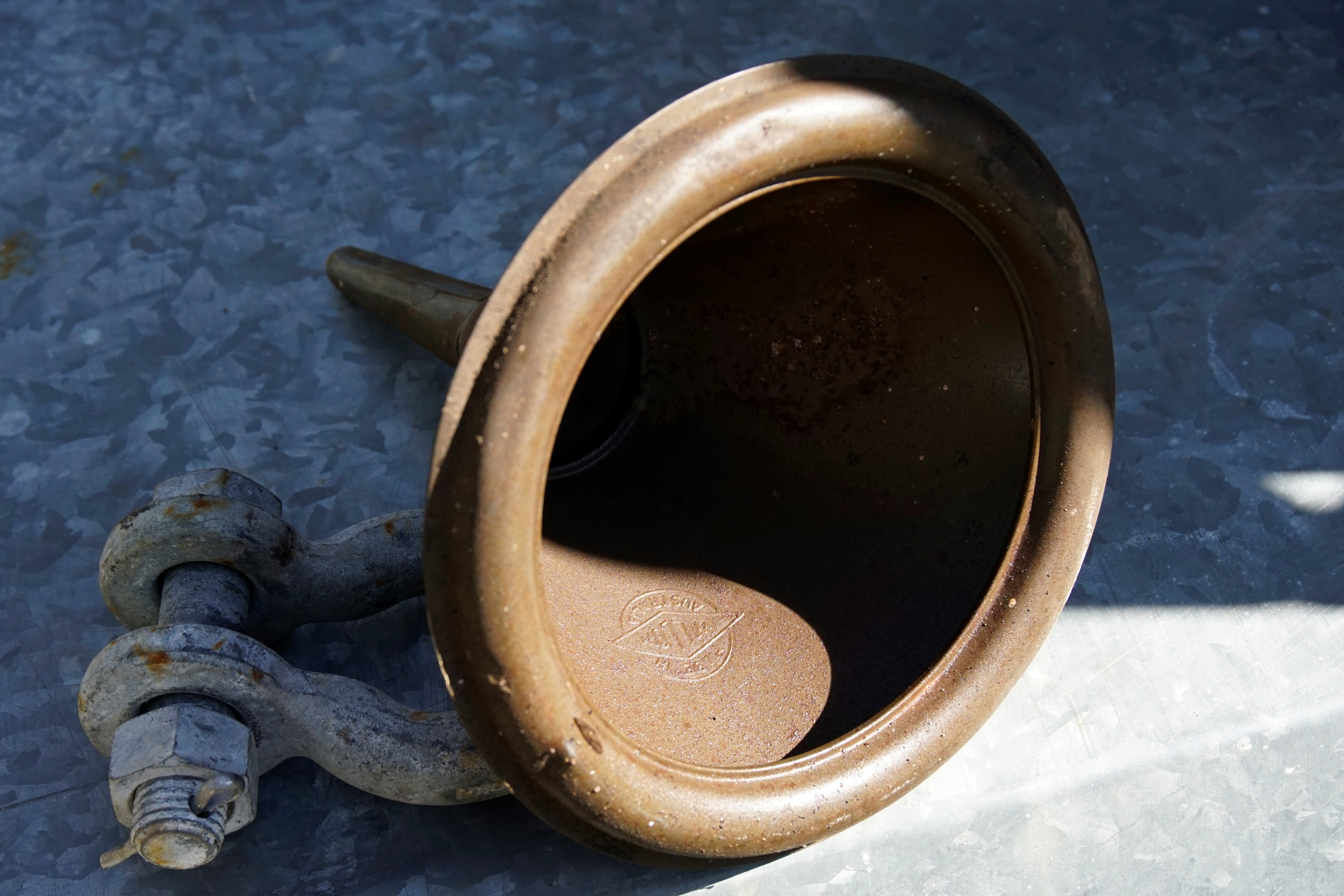
"Willow" oil funnel

Willow Ware had its origin in Wilson Brothers Pty, founded by Ralph and Richard, sons of Ralph Wilson, sen., (c. 1826 – 14 June 1901) and Elizabeth Wilson ( – 21 April 1912). With start-up capital from their parents, they began making tin cans in 1887, and constructed a factory in North Melbourne. Ralph Wilson (1865 – 10 December 1930) married Agnes Kirkwood Twaddell (1870–1946) in 1896, and lived at "Benarty", in High Street, Malvern. Ralph seems to have been a respected employer, but nothing has been found of his brother Richard's involvement, except for his retirement in 1906.

Apart from robberies and vandalism, the company was never in the news. It established the "Willow" brand in the 1920s, making Coolgardie safes, billies and other metal cookware, and became W., M., Y., and A. H. Wilson Ltd. The firm later moved to Tullamarine, and now only makes plastic products. Since 2018, the brand has been owned by Decor Corporation, a subsidiary of Marlin Management Services.
