= TCW Group =

Global investment management firm

The TCW Group, Inc.
- Trade name: TCW
- Type: Private
- Industry: Investment management
- Founded: 1971; 55 years ago
- Headquarters: Los Angeles, California, United States
- Key people: Katie Koch (president & CEO)
- Products: Fixed Income, Equity, and International Mutual Funds, Strategies, and Alternative Investments
- AUM: $201 billion (2025)
- Owner: Company management, Carlyle Group and Nippon Life Insurance Company
- Website: www.tcw.com

The TCW Group, Inc. (TCW), formerly Trust Company of the West, is an American asset management firm. Headquartered in Los Angeles, California, the company operates worldwide, offering a range of investment products, including fixed income, equities, asset management and advisory services. The president and CEO of the TCW Group is Katie Koch.

== History ==
Founded by Robert Addison Day in 1971 and headquartered in Los Angeles; TCW manages a broad range of investment products. Originally known as Trust Company of the West; TCW clients include many of the largest corporate and public pension plans, financial institutions, endowments and foundations in the U.S., as well as foreign investors and high-net-worth individuals.

In 2001, Société Générale (SocGen) acquired a controlling interest in The TCW Group.

In December 2009, TCW fired its top fund manager, Jeffrey Gundlach, who had offered to buy a majority stake in the firm for about $350 million, (less than 50% of the amount paid by SocGen for its controlling interest in 2001). Gundlach established DoubleLine Capital the same month, and was later awarded $66.7 million in TCW earnings by a jury in September 2011.

On February 24, 2010, TCW announced the completion of its acquisition of smaller rival Metropolitan West Asset Management LLC (MetWest) investment management firm.

In February 2013, TCW management and alternative asset manager The Carlyle Group acquired TCW Group from Société Générale. As a result of the transaction, TCW management and employees increased their ownership in the firm to approximately 40% on a fully diluted basis, better aligning interests with clients. Equity for the investment came from two Carlyle investment funds and from TCW management.

In December 2017, Nippon Life Insurance Company purchased a 25% minority stake in TCW from The Carlyle Group. As a result of the purchase, ownership by TCW management and employees increased to 44%, while Carlyle maintains a 31% interest in the firm.
