= Preservation of cultural venues =

Preservation of cultural venues refers to efforts to preserve venues for the arts and for performances, such as theaters, music halls, cafes and bars that feature live music, as well as galleries and exhibition spaces. Such efforts can be based on the cultural or historical significance of a venue.

In a larger sense, the phrase "cultural venue" can also include any artistic site, or public gathering space, i.e. including restaurants, meeting halls, as opposed to commercial venues like retail stores or office buildings, or structures such as warehouses or private homes.

== United States ==
=== Nashville, Tennessee ===
In 2019. the National Trust for Historic Preservation submitted formal comments to the Metro Nashville Planning Commission in Nashville, Tennessee, regarding the city's MusicRow Vision Plan, arguing for more robust historic preservation, particularly in light of the fifty buildings on Music Row that had been demolished between 2013 and 2019.

Its recommendations included a proposal to enact tighter zoning regulations to limit building heights, and thereby preserve the atmosphere in that historic area by preserving smaller historic buildings. They also recommended to develop the city's "Transfer of Development Rights" program, to encourage owners of historic properties to identify an entity that could preserve the site. They also urged creation of a nonprofit to manage a revolving fund for the preservation of music business properties.

== Historical events ==
=== COVID-19 pandemic of 2020 ===
With the extensive financial disruption across all areas of the economy, many governments announced fiscal stimulus and economic bailout packages which included specific resources for the arts and cultural sectors. Equally, various charities and industry bodies raised funds to support their sector.

Arts and culture sector financial stimulus packages from individual countries included:

Australia: In March, a petition of over 50 arts and culture organisations (including peak bodies from the music, dance, visual arts, museums, writers' and indigenous arts groups) requested a financial aid package "...to a value of 2% of the $111.7 billion [cultural and creative] industry". Furthermore, it requesting the Prime Minister "...issue a public statement recognising the value of our industry to all Australians" and noting that the industry had not yet recovered from the impact of the 2019–20 Australian bushfire season. Separately, Live Performance Australia, "the advocacy body for the live performing industry" had requested $850 million for its sector.

Instead of the $2.2billion requested in the petition, In early April the federal government announced a package of $27million in specific Arts funding – $7 million for the Indigenous Visual Arts Industry Support program, $10 million for Regional Arts Australia's regional arts fund, and $10 million for Support Act,"the charity that provides financial support and counselling to people in the music industry". It also expanded unemployment assistance in response to the pandemic – dubbed JobKeeper – however it specifically excluded "freelancers and casuals on short-term contracts, or who have worked for a series of employers in the last year". Given arts sector's high reliance on short-term contracts, a large proportion of arts and cultural sector professionals were ineligible for the scheme.

United Kingdom: Arts Council England announced £160 million would be made available for arts organisations, including £50 million for organisations it does not usually fund and £20 million for individual and freelance artists.

==== United States ====
United States: In late March the United States federal government announced a $2 trillion economic stimulus package in the Coronavirus Aid, Relief, and Economic Security Act. It included: "$75 million for the National Endowment for the Arts and $75 million for the National Endowment for the Humanities, which can pass on the money to institutions that need it. Another $50 million was designated to the Institute of Museum and Library Services, which distributes funds to museums and libraries. Some Republicans criticized US$25 million in relief funding that was allocated for the Kennedy Center as wasteful spending.

In the United States, the COVID-19 pandemic put major pressure on live cultural venues, due to laws about social distancing. The National Independent Venues Association issued a poll, which found that around 90% of its members might be forced to close permanently without federal assistance.In July 2020, Senators Amy Klobuchar (a Democrat) and John Cornyn (a Republican) proposed the "Save Our Stages Act", to provide $10 billion in funding for independent cultural venues.

Also, Marc Geiger, a businessman, announced a new effort to finance live venues, in order to help to preserve them and to keep them open and financially viable.

== See also ==
- Historic preservation
- Historic landmark
- Conservation and restoration of immovable cultural property

== External reading ==
=== News articles ===
- Nashville at a crossroads: preserving music city’s diverse heritage amidst new challenges by Tereza Patočková, nighttime.org.
