= Woollahra =

Suburb in Sydney, New South Wales

- Suburb
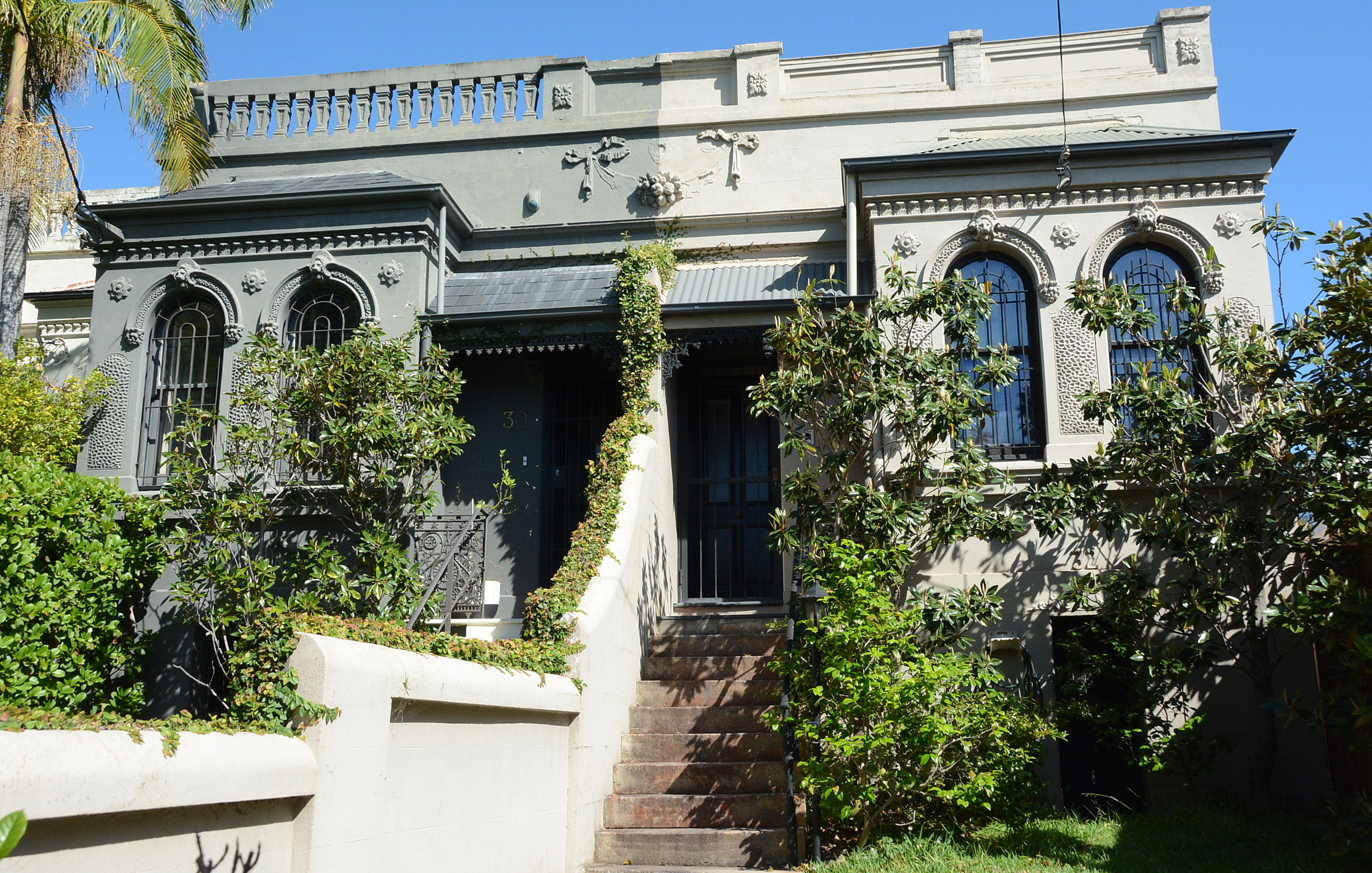
- Woollahra cottages

- Interactive map of Woollahra
- Country: Australia
- State: New South Wales
- City: Sydney
- LGA: Municipality of Woollahra
- Location: 5 km (3.1 mi) east of Sydney CBD

Government
  - State electorate: Sydney, Vaucluse
  - Federal division: Wentworth

Area
  - Total: 1.23 km^{2} (0.47 sq mi)
- Elevation: 72 m (236 ft)

Population
  - Total: 7,189 (SAL 2021)
- Postcode: 2025
Suburbs around Woollahra
Edgecliff	Double Bay	Bellevue Hill
Paddington	Woollahra	Bondi
Moore Park	Centennial Park	Bondi Junction

Woollahra (/wʊˈlɑːrə/ wool-AH-rə) is a suburb in the Eastern Suburbs of Sydney, in the state of New South Wales, Australia. Woollahra is located 5 km (3.1 mi) east of the Sydney central business district, in the local government area of the Municipality of Woollahra. Woollahra is located on the traditional land of the Birrabirragal and Gadigal people of the Eora Nation. The Municipality of Woollahra takes its name from the suburb but its administrative centre is located in Double Bay. Woollahra is known for its quiet, tree-lined residential streets and village-style shopping centre.

== History ==
Woollahra is located on the traditional land of the Birrabirragal and Gadigal people of the Eora Nation. When European settlers arrived in 1788, First Fleet officer Daniel Southwell translated the Dharug (the local Aboriginal language) word Woo-la-ra (also later spelt by others as Willarra and Wallara) as meaning "lookout", but it has also been translated as "camp" or "meeting ground".

The name was adopted by Daniel Cooper (1821–1902), the first speaker of the legislative assembly of New South Wales, when he laid the foundations of Woollahra House in 1856. It was built on the site of the old Henrietta Villa (or Point Piper House). Cooper and his descendants were responsible for the establishment and progress of the suburb and its name was taken from the house.

Although Woollahra is predominantly a residential and retail area today, for over forty years and into early 20th century, there was a large iron foundry and cooking stove factory on Edgecliff Road.

Woollahra was the home of John McGarvie Smith, a metallurgist and biochemist who produced the first preservable anthrax vaccine.

== Heritage listings ==
Woollahra has a number of heritage-listed sites, including:

- 14 Rosemont Avenue: Rosemont (Woollahra)
- Waimea Avenue: Waimea House

== Population ==
At the 2021 census, the population of Woollahra was 7,189, down from 7,405 people in 2016. 63.1% of people were born in Australia. The next most common countries of birth were England 6.7%, New Zealand 2.9%, South Africa 2.8% and the United States of America 1.7%. 79.6% of people spoke only English at home. Other languages spoken at home included Mandarin at 2.7%, Spanish 1.4% and French 1.3%. The most common responses for religion in Woollahra were No Religion 41.3%, Catholic 19.1% and Anglican 14.5%. Over the last 50 years, Woollahra's population has shrunk.

== Commercial area ==
Woollahra, along with its neighbouring suburb, Paddington, has the highest concentration of art galleries in Sydney. There are numerous cafes, restaurants and antique shops clustered around Queen Street.

The suburb is home to many government consulates, including Serbia, Russia, Poland, and Turkey.

== Churches ==
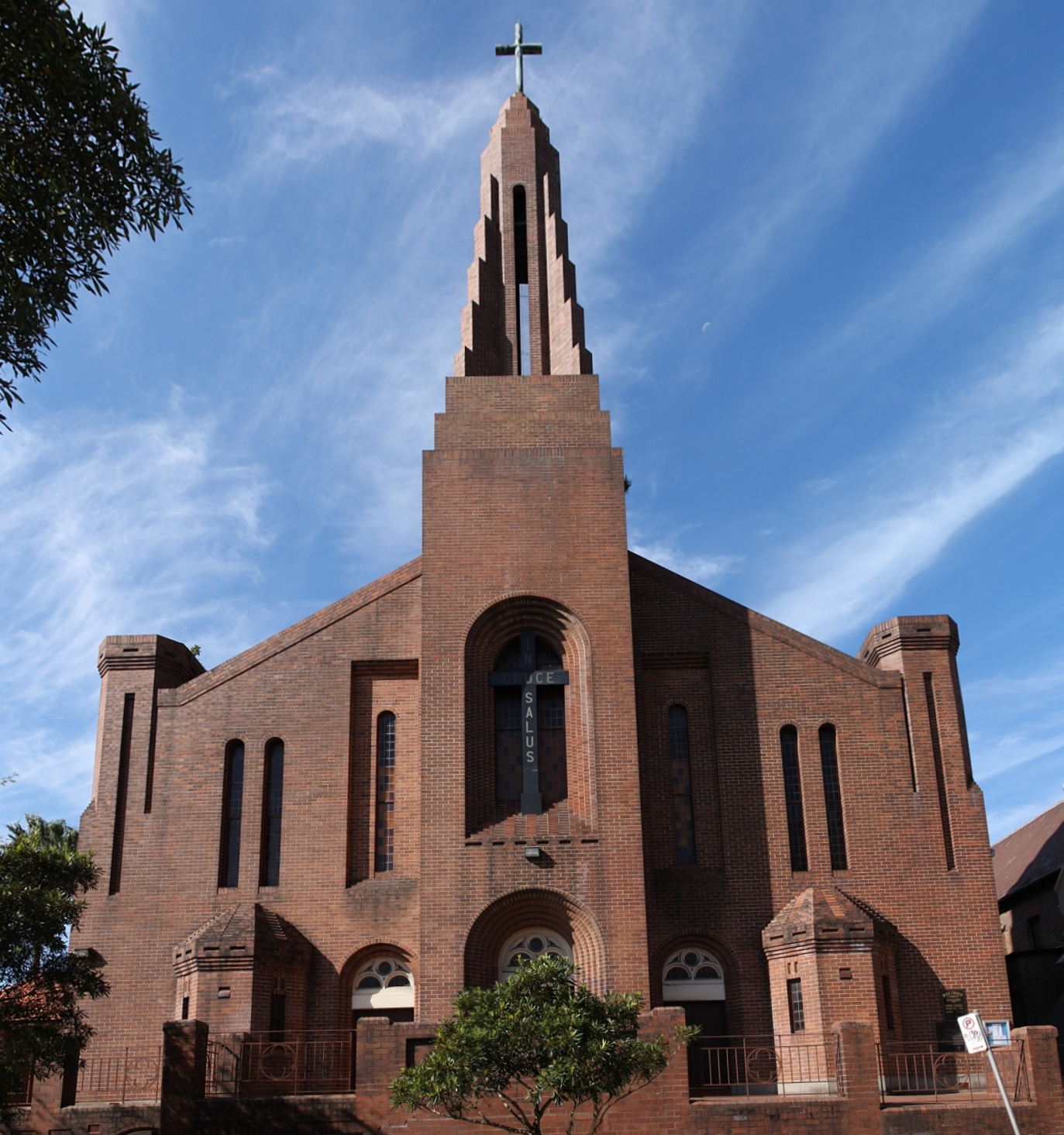
Holy Cross Church, Adelaide Street (designed by Austin Mackay)

One of the more prominent churches, All Saints in Ocean Street, was designed by Edmund Blacket and built from 1874 to 1881. Henry Mort, a resident of Ocean Street, donated £3,000 towards the construction of the church. However, the church was never entirely finished; it includes a porch that was meant to be a base for a tower and spire, which was designed but never built. It is constructed predominantly of dressed sandstone and is now listed on the Register of the National Estate. It has been described as "a beautifully designed and crafted parish church that has important connections with many famous Australian families."

A stylistic contrast is provided by the Holy Cross Church in Adelaide Street. This brick church was designed by Austin Mackay and built in 1940. It is a rarity insofar as it is an Art Deco church, which is unusual enough, and it also shows the influence of Dutch architecture.

The Congregational Church, on the corner of Jersey Road and Moncur Street, was built in 1875–1877 and designed by Benjamin Backhouse. It was burned out much later but eventually restored and converted to residential use. It is listed on the Register of the National Estate.

== Housing ==
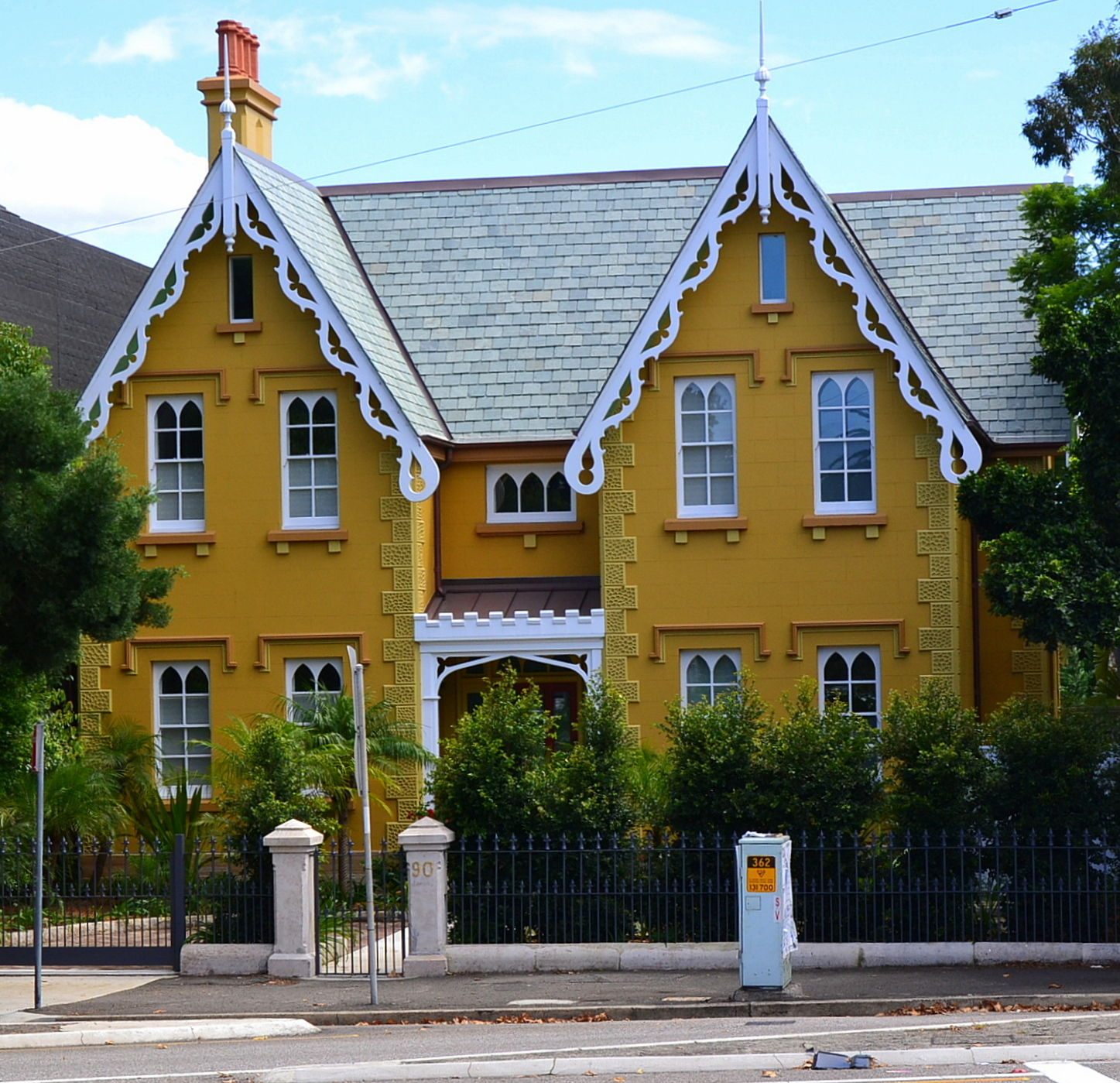
Residential home on Oxford Street

Woollahra is a considerably affluent suburb, due in part to its proximity to the city and the shopping centre at Bondi Junction, plus a wide range of picturesque homes, mostly in various Victorian styles. Moncur Street and Queen Street are particularly affluent areas, with a mixture of residential and commercial buildings and an extraordinarily high number of heritage-listed buildings.

High-rise development has historically been avoided, maintaining the heritage character of the suburb. Residential Woollahra streets are mostly two-story homes or low density unit blocks. In 2014, Woollahra Council recorded 26,050 dwellings in the area, with "approximately 76% of all dwellings being multi-unit housing (generally residential flat buildings)". The remaining 24% of all dwellings are listed in the category of detached houses, semi-detached houses and terrace houses.

In July 2025, Woollahra Council opposed the Government of New South Wales Low and Mid-Rise Housing Policy. The council mailed a brochure "highlighting the impacts" of the policy to all residents.

=== 2025 Woollahra rezoning proposal ===
In August 2025, the state government under Chris Minns announced the Edgecliff Woollahra Precinct proposal to build 10,000 new apartments in the area "over the next 10-15 years" alongside the completion of Woollahra station. The development would create a similar population density to Green Square, and Woollahra Mayor Sarah Dixson said it was a dystopian nightmare in waiting.

The Woolahra Council proposed an alternative scheme with 3600 dwellings. SCT Consultants conducted traffic modelling which reported an ultimate capacity of approximately 5,000 new homes. NSW Minister for Planning Paul Scully claimed "this is just another NIMBY excuse from Woollahra Council to reject plans for thousands of well-located homes in an area with infrastructure capacity."

On 8 September 2026, the NSW Government unveiled more detailed plans to add 9400 new homes in Woollahra, including seven new parks, 9km of new walking and cycling paths and a new local centre. The plans did not include compulsory acquisition. Woollahra is the most feasible area in New South Wales to build new housing.

The plans were expected to result in backlash. Woollahra Council opposed the proposal and described it as a "disaster". Woollahra mayor Sarah Dixson critised the plan, claiming they would become "luxury apartments". Woollahra council allocated $700,000 to oppose the high-rise development plans and hired political strategists Wolf+Smith for over $100,000 without a formal tender process in "their fight against the rezoning proposal".

Woollahra Deputy Mayor Sean Carmichael changed his view from initial criticism to a more supportive position, arguing that the council's alternative plan was an insult to young Sydneysiders.

The provision of homes in Edgecliff and Woollahra was modelled by Transport for NSW to result in a net reduction in vehicle kilometres travelled (VKT) by car across the Sydney Greater Metropolitan Area compared to growth taking place further away from public transport and amenities. No future strategic cycling corridors have been identified for Woollahra (based on Transport for NSW strategic cycleway corridors). Edgecliff may form part of the corridor from Rose Bay to Darlinghurst.

On 24 September, Municipality of Woollahra Mayor Sarah Dixson said planning documents include about $600 million for transport infrastructure and guessed there would be $500 million allocated for the station. She was skeptical the NSW Government would promise Woollahra Council $500 million for a train station in an election year. The former Assistant Government Architect Andrew Andersons described the state-led proposal as "a total travesty of anything to do with urban design". Phillip Thalis (the Australian Institute of Architects 2024 Gold medallist) stated "it needs to be much much better", claiming the state government site amalgamation was "extraordinarily poor".

Thalis has praised the form and analysis of the Woollahra Council's 60-page document but criticised the council. He viewed the alternative plan as "refreshingly strategic"., impressive and well-founded "particularly for a local council". He viewed it "as good as anything I've seen from them", "quite courageous" in what the council was willing to give up, and much more palatable and digestible than the state government report. Thalis stated he wished Woollahra Council had always been this strategic, and that he was not going to speak up in favour of the council as he had to go to court with them many times, as well as at the present. He criticised "all the Eastern Suburbs Councils" for being "derelict" in actually allowing sensible increases in housing density, which Andrew Andersons agreed with.

Anderson's view is that rather than spending $200 million on a station, sites could be purchased to build parkland in all the areas. He stated on 24 September the current plans "just get an uplift", but no infrastructure of public open space. Thalis expressed that planning in New South Wales had been turned into a development industry, rather than city-making, rather than seeking public benefit.

Andrew Andersons claimed at a 50th anniversary event of the Neville Wran government, Chris Minns made a keynote speech where he made "extremely churlish remarks about getting the rich people in Woollahra", which he claimed was received with "mirth".

== Schools ==
Woollahra Public School opened in 1877. It is a two-storey brick building that was designed by J. Wigram and W. Kemp. The building is listed on the Register of the National Estate. The school includes Opportunity Classes in Years 5 and 6 for gifted students. The school celebrated its centenary in 1977 and a time capsule was buried in the grounds.

== Transport ==
Woollahra is serviced by Transdev John Holland and Transit Systems bus services, including the 389 route, as well as numerous services along Oxford Street in the suburb's south. Routes 333 and 440 provide direct services to the Sydney CBD from Oxford Street. The 352 on Oxford Street provides commuters with a service to Surry Hills, Newtown and Marrickville in the city's south.

The Eastern Suburbs Railway runs through Woollahra, with the nearest railway stations being Edgecliff to the north of the suburb and Bondi Junction to the south, both served by the T4 Eastern Suburbs & Illawarra Line. During the railway's construction, Woollahra station remained incomplete due to local opposition and cost blowouts. In August 2025, the state government announced plans to complete the station, expected to open by 2029.

== Culture and events ==
=== Queen Street Fair ===
From 1972, a fair was held in Queen Street. Initially a community fair, it grew and became more commercial until local residents became unhappy with its noise, size, and disruption. Consequently, the fair ceased after 1985.

== Sport and recreation ==
Since 1908, Woollahra has been represented in one of Australia's most popular sporting competitions, the National Rugby League, by the Sydney Roosters, officially known as the Eastern Suburbs District Rugby League Football Club.

== Notable people ==
- Dorothy Jane Adele Helmrich (1889–1984), mezzo-soprano and arts administrator
- David Shoebridge, Australian Greens leader

== Gallery ==
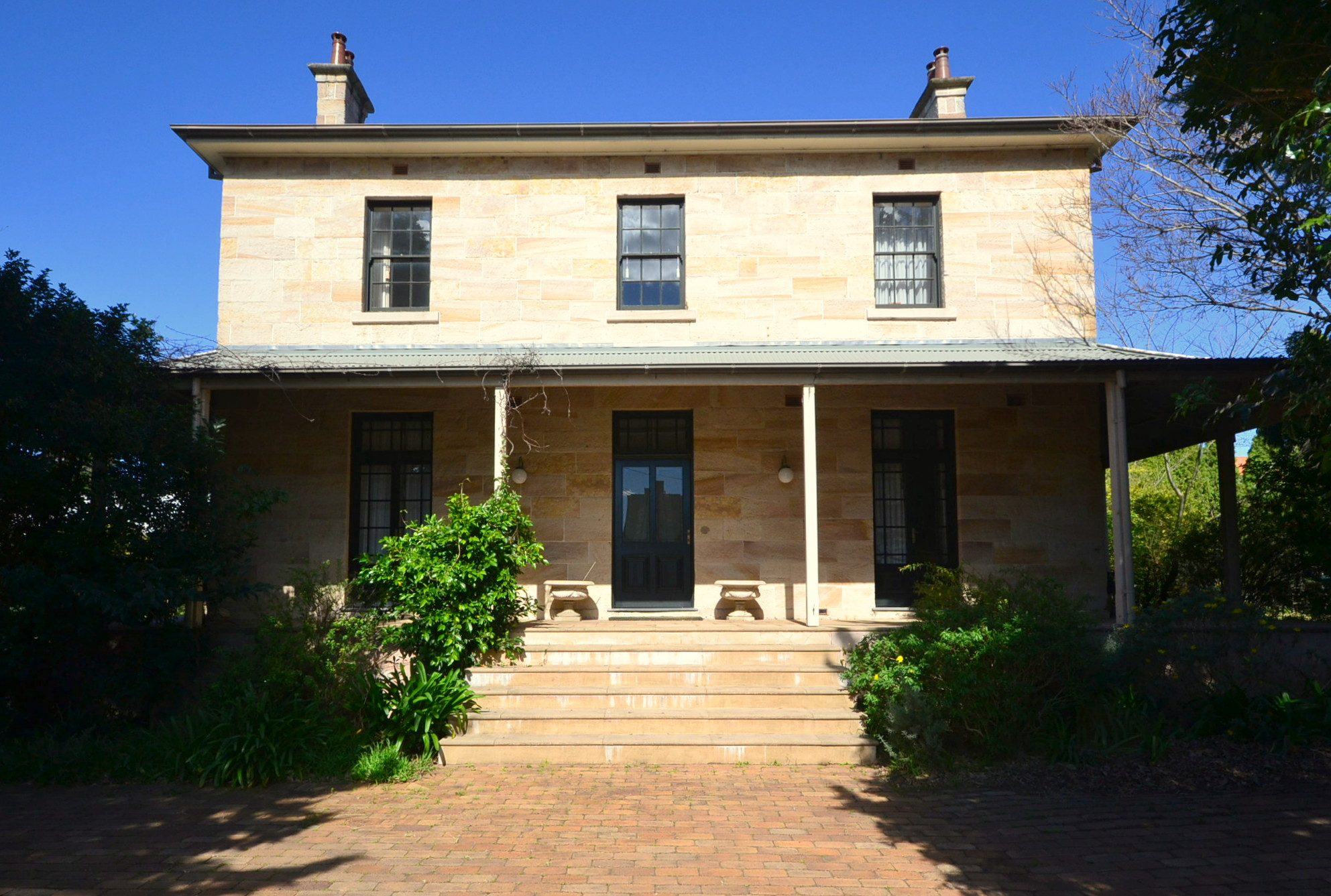
Waimea, heritage-listed Georgian home (circa 1858), Waimea Avenue

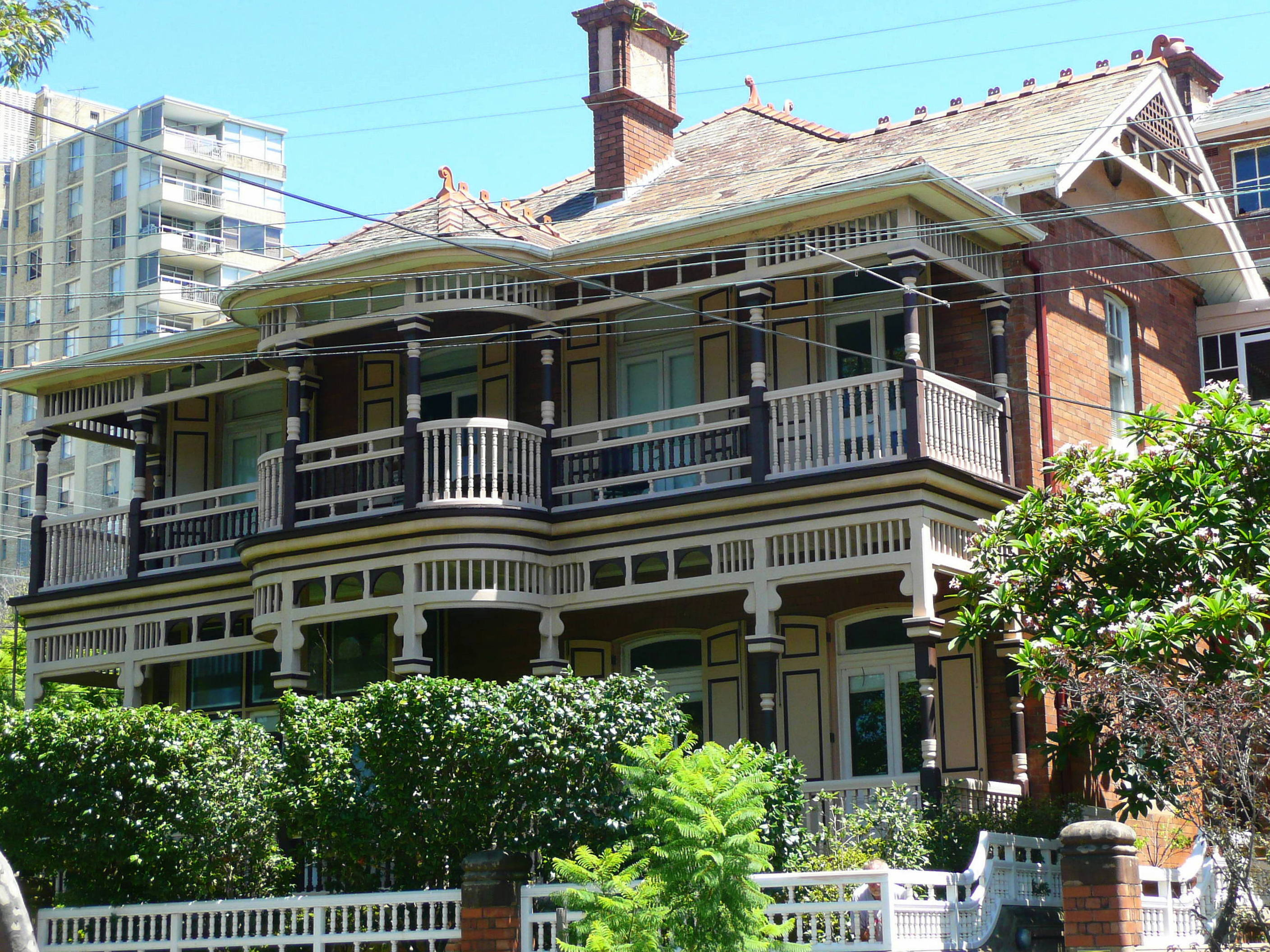
Federation Queen Anne home, Edgecliff Road

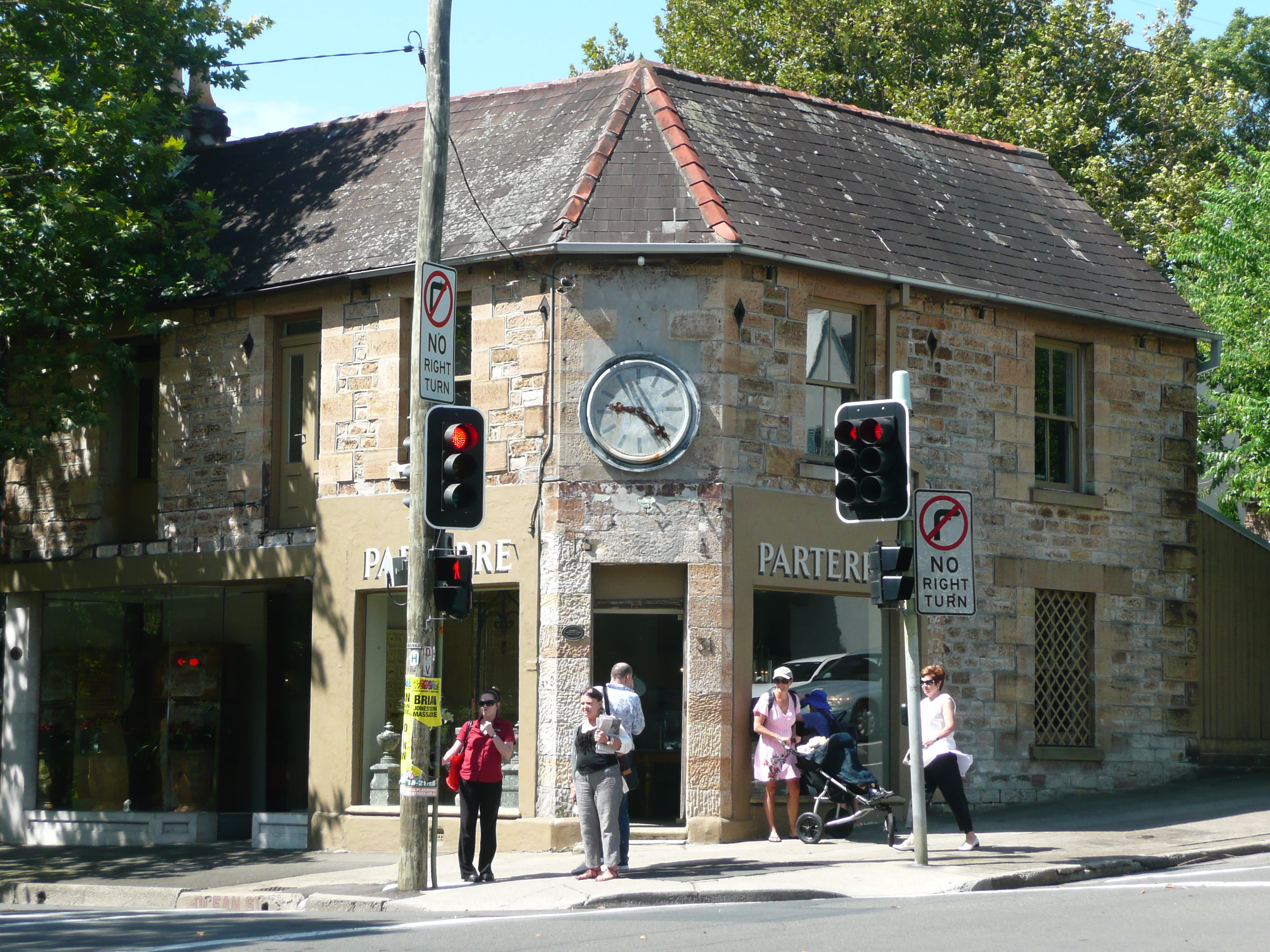
Heritage-listed shop, Ocean Street (circa 1860)

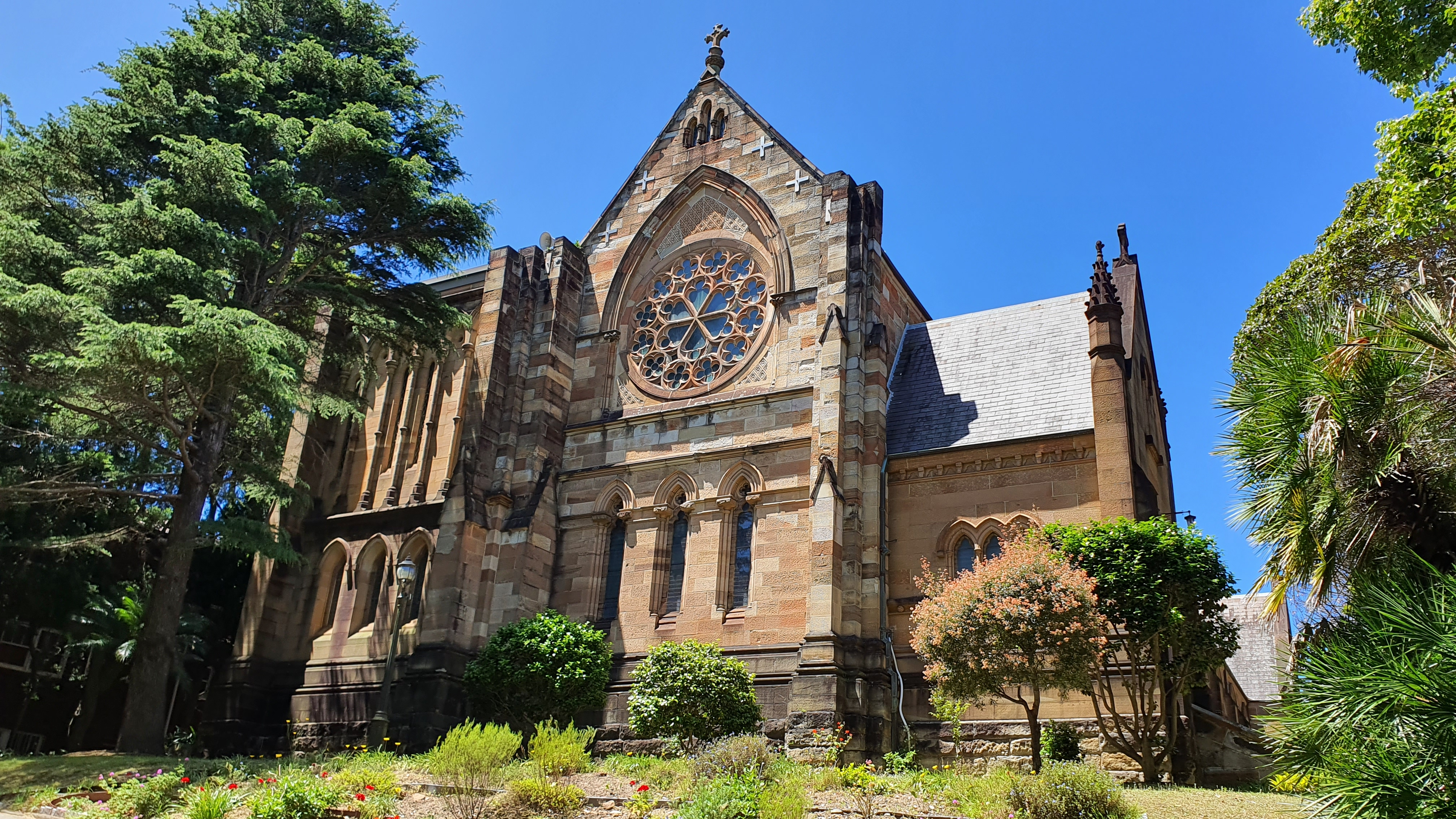
All Saints Church, Ocean Street
