= Bennelong Apartments =

Residential apartment building and multi-use complex in Sydney, Australia

Coordinates: 33.859943°S 151.213074°E

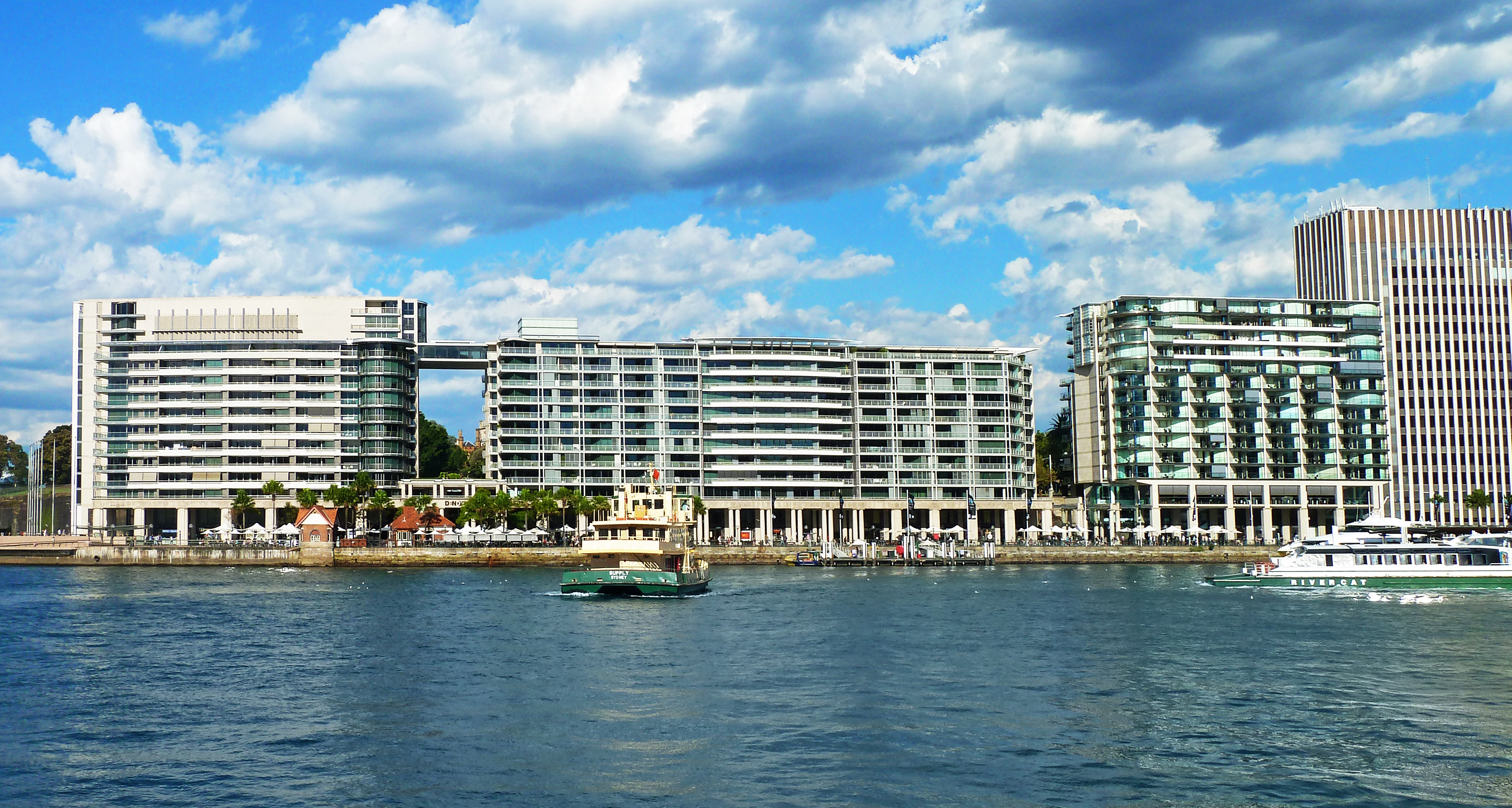
The Bennelong Apartments. From left to right – 1 Macquarie Street, 3-7 Macquarie Street, 61 Macquarie Street.

The Bennelong Apartments is a residential apartment building and multi-use complex on the east side of Sydney's Circular Quay. The buildings were designed by Andrew Andersons and PTW Architects, and completed in 1998.

The Bennelong Apartments consist of three buildings. No. 1 Macquarie Street is the northernmost building in the development. It is connected via a bridge at its southern end to the No. 3-7 Macquarie Street building, which houses a cinema, restaurants and shops, as well as apartments. The southernmost building, No. 61 Macquarie Street, contains the Pullman Quay Grand Hotel and apartments. The nickname "the Toaster" derives from the resemblance of No. 1 Macquarie Street to the kitchen appliance, but the term is also applied to the whole complex.

In November 2007, an apartment in the building sold for $8.4 million. With an internal area of 190 square metres, the price of $44,210 per square metre was an Australian record. In July 2015, a Level 11 penthouse in the Bennelong Apartments sold for approximately $22 million, which at the time was the second most expensive apartment sale in the history of Sydney and Australia.

== Site history ==
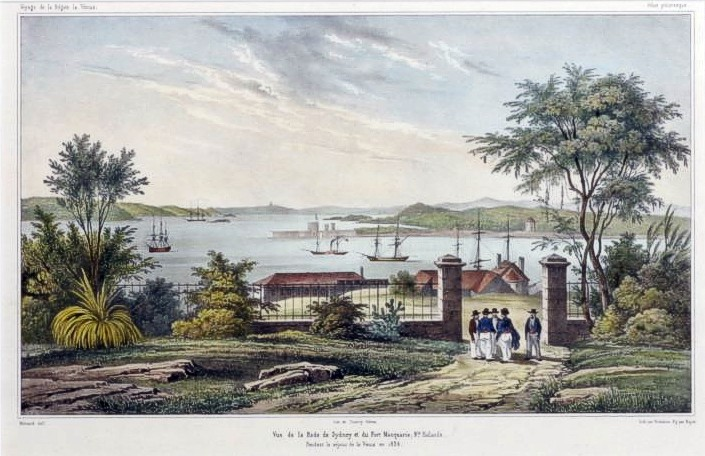
View east across Sydney Cove, c. 1841

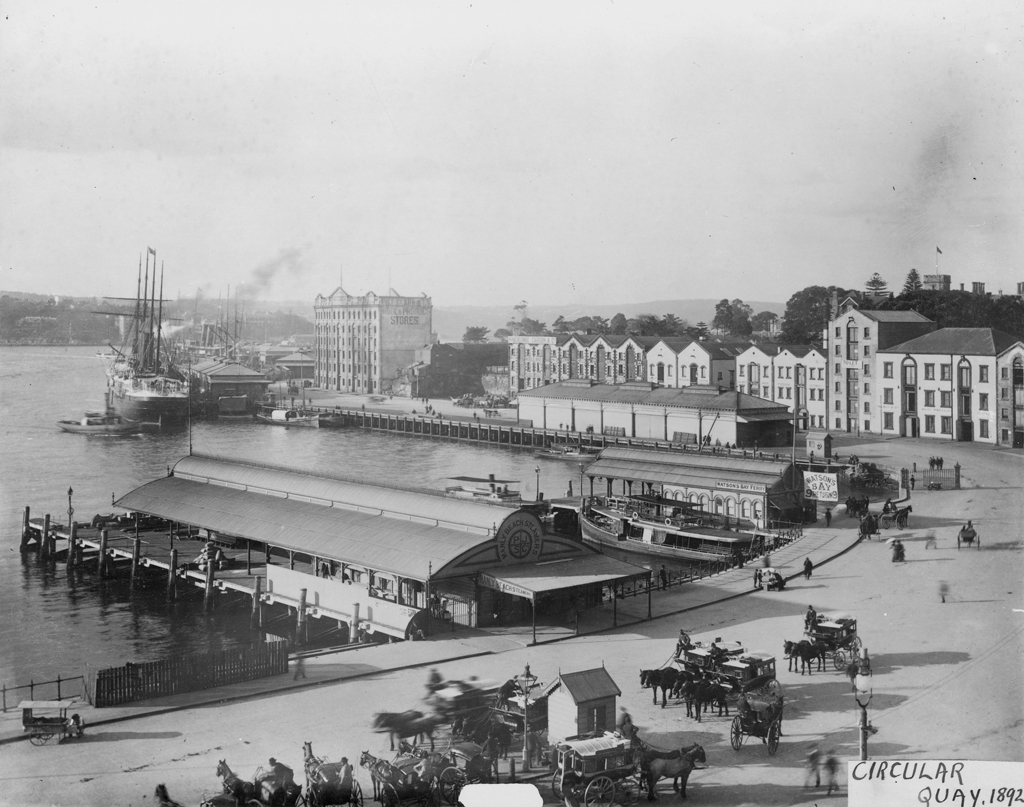
East Circular Quay lined with warehouses, c. 1892

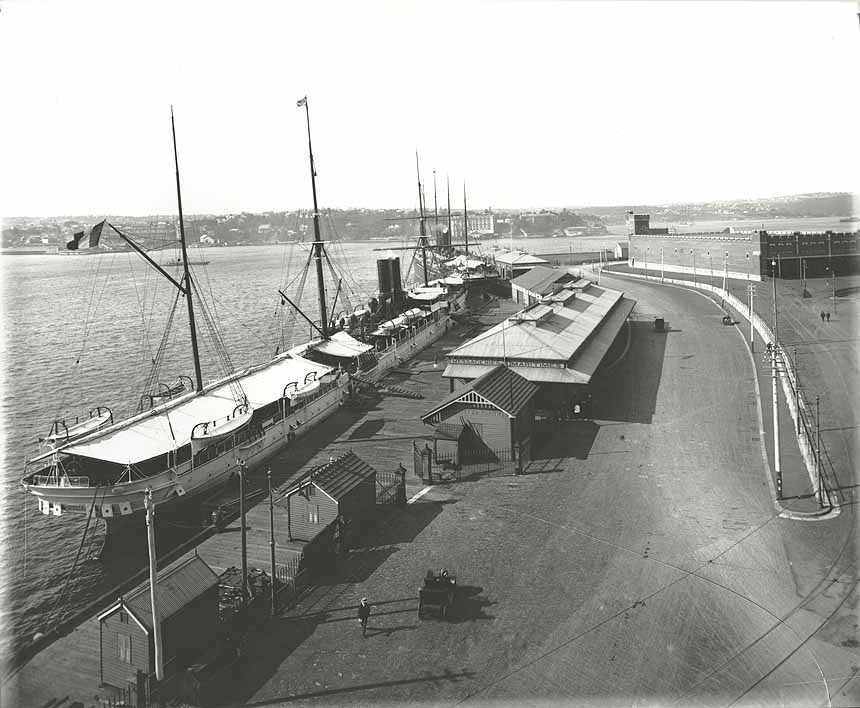
Along the waterfront in East Circular Quay, c.1906

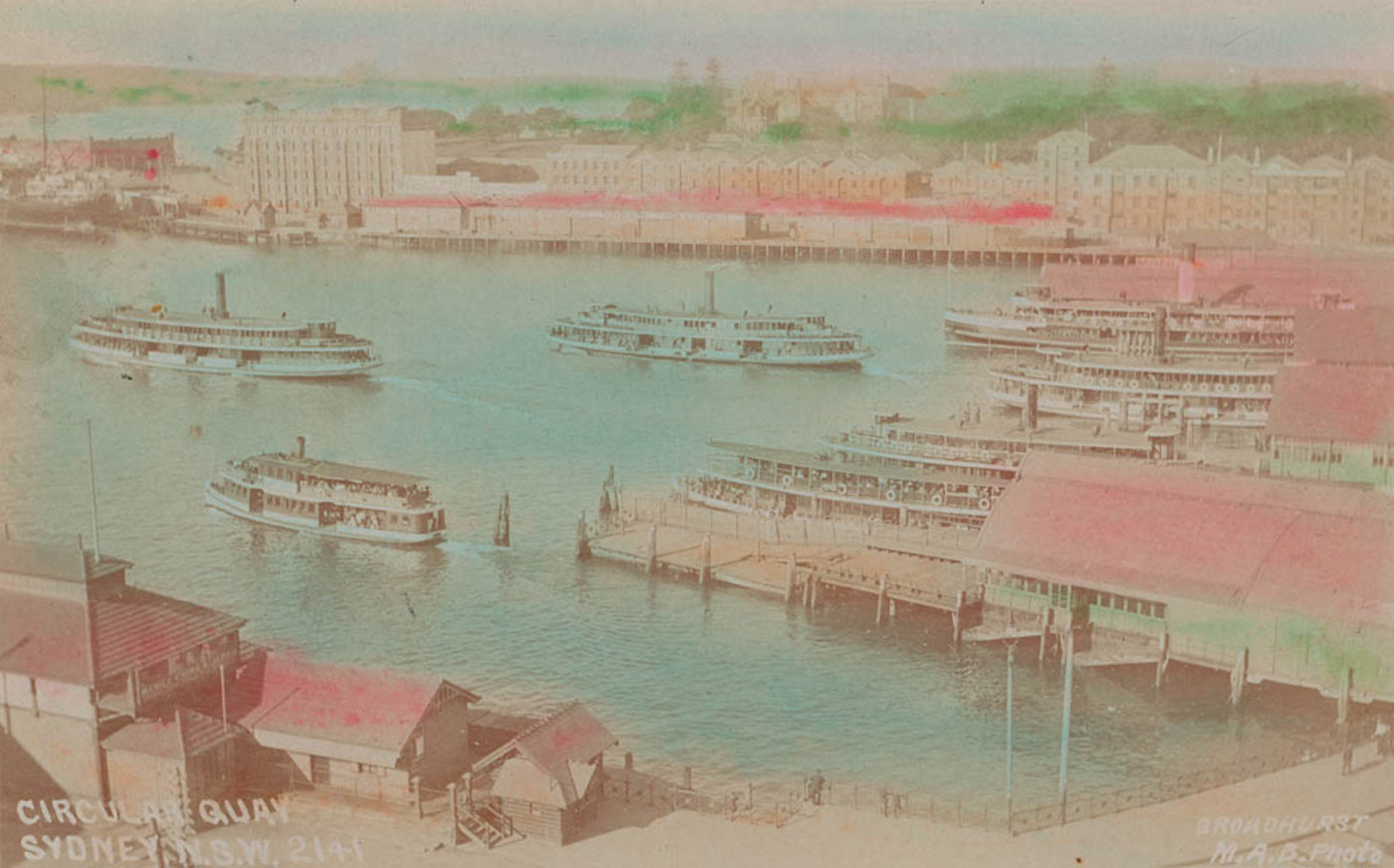
East Circular Quay c.1900-1927

The Bennelong Apartments sit on the eastern side of Sydney Cove or Circular Quay. This was the site of the first landing by Europeans in Sydney, on 26 January 1788. The governor's temporary canvas house was erected on the east side of the cove. Unlike the southern and western sides of Sydney Cove, the eastern side of the cove remained largely uninhabited in the early years of the colony; one notable inhabitant was Bennelong, after whom the adjacent Bennelong Point and Bennelong Apartments are named. In the early 19th century, the entire area was part of the Governor's Domain, though some commercial activity developed along the shoreline.

During the construction of Circular Quay in 1837–1844, the eastern side of the cove was used as a quarry and housed construction works. After the governor's residence was moved up the hill to the present Government House, in the 1840s and 1850s Macquarie Street was extended north through the Governor's Domain to Fort Macquarie. This led to the development of the area between the street and the shore into a commercial working wharf dominated by the wool trade, while the eastern side of the street remained part of the Domain. This part of Macquarie Street became known as the "wool store" end. Wool and bond stores and warehouses appeared on the site. The historic "Moore Stairs" was built in 1868 as a passage between two wool stores, leading from the shore to Macquarie Street.

Major redevelopment of East Circular Quay did not occur until the 1950s. Wool stores were demolished and replaced by a number of modernist commercial buildings lining the eastern side of Circular Quay. The height limit was increased from 150 to 915 feet (46 to 279 m) in 1959.

Between 1971 and 1989, Colonial Mutual Life acquired the buildings along east Circular Quay for a large scale development. The initial, highly controversial design was revised after the intervention of the then Prime Minister Paul Keating. In return for reducing the height of the buildings and adding a colonnade to facilitate public access, the development was permitted to extend further towards the Circular Quay foreshore, with the design finalised in 1992.

In 2017, the last remaining mid-century office building in east Circular Quay, directly south of the Bennelong Apartments complex and located at no. 79 Macquarie Street, was demolished. The former "Amatil Building" will be replaced by a new mixed use development similar to the Bennelong Apartments.

== Criticism ==
In 1994 the Anti-Wall Committee was formed to lobby for the return of the natural landscape of East Circular Quay that existed prior to the erection of modernist office buildings in the 1950s. In 1997 the "Save East Circular Quay Committee" convened to continue lobbying. Both movements were ultimately unsuccessful.

Some commentators are of the view that the design of the building does not enhance the Sydney Harbour foreshore. The building has been criticised for the quality of its design, its occupation of previously public space, and its positioning, and blocking historical sightlines. David Williams describes the Toaster as a "building that most Sydneysiders would quite happily blow up". One of the project's most vocal critics was broadcaster Alan Jones. Jones would later purchase an apartment in 1 Macquarie Street.

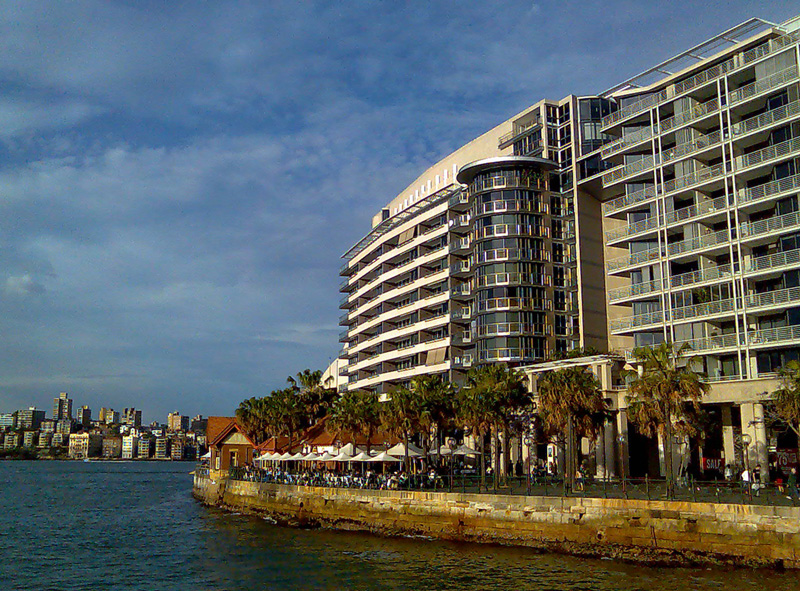
No. 1 Macquarie Street, "The Toaster", view from Circular Quay

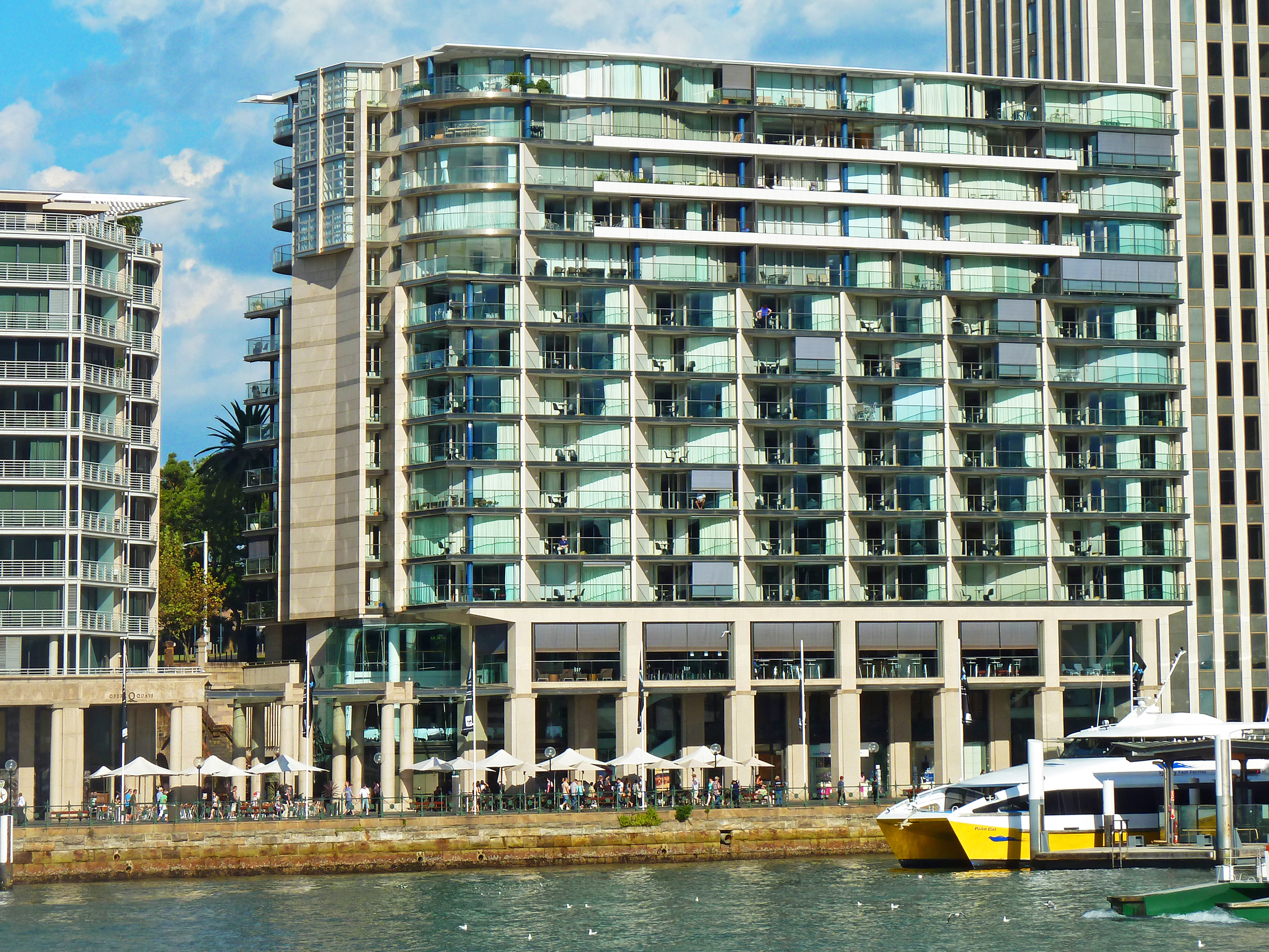
No. 61 Macquarie Street, the Pullman Quay Grand Hotel, view from The Rocks
