= Shave =

Shave may refer to:

- to shave refers to the act of shaving
- Shave (surname)
- Shave (magazine), a periodical magazine
- "Shave", a song by Enon from their 2003 album Hocus Pocus
- Severe Hazards Analysis and Verification Experiment, a database of storm impact based on telephone surveys
