= Shave (surname) =

Shave is an English surname. Notable people with this surname include the following:

- Justin Shave (born 1973), Australian composer and music producer
- Kenneth Shave (1916–2009), Australian soldier, businessman and benefactor of the arts
- Jon Shave (baseball) (born 1967), American baseball player
