= Rosemont, Woollahra =

Rosemont
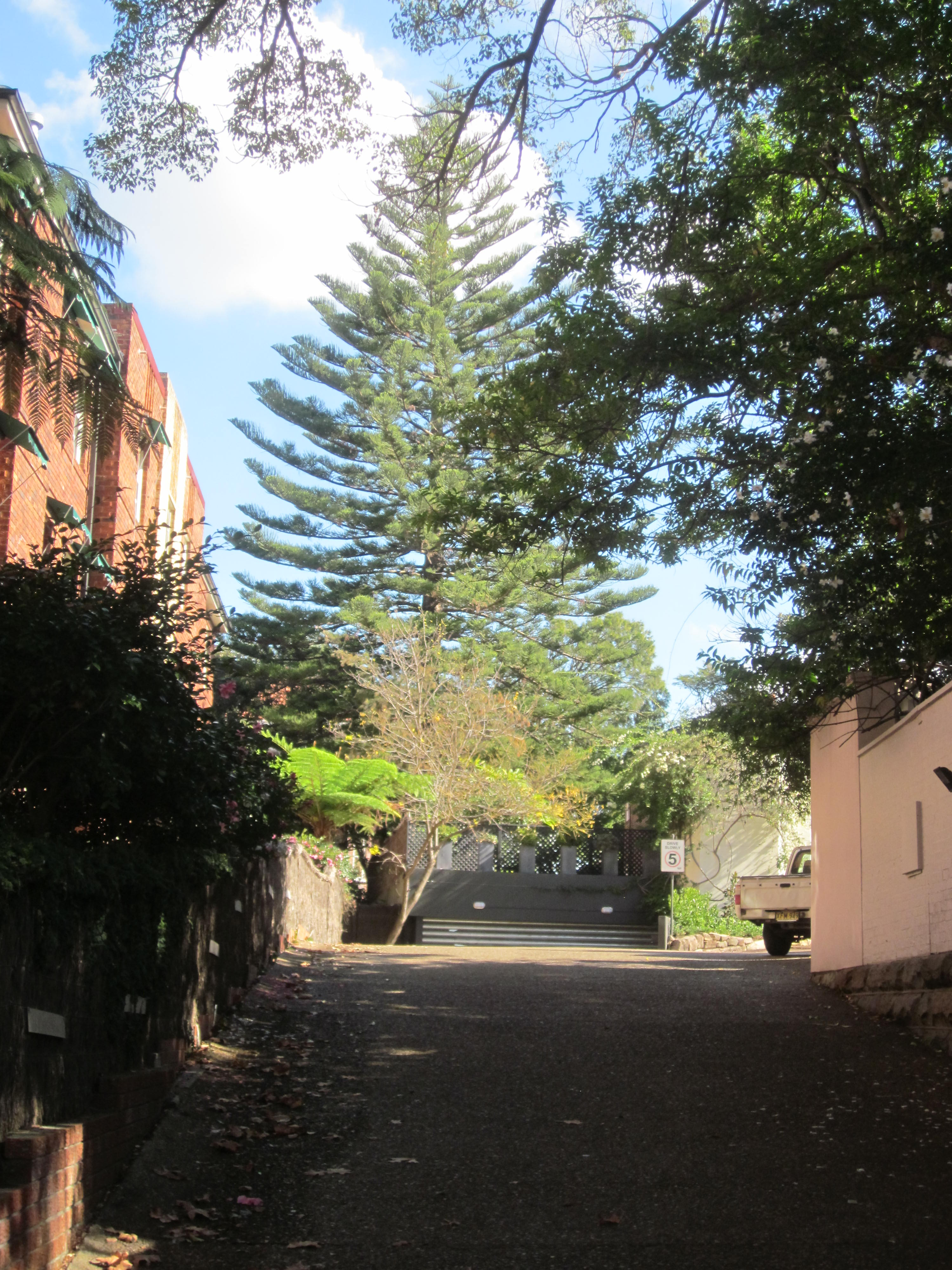
- Entrance to Rosemont, 14 Rosemont Avenue, Woollahra, NSW

- Location within Sydney Location within Australia
- 33°52′56″S 151°14′24″E
- Location: 14 Rosemont Avenue, Woollahra, New South Wales, Australia

Site notes
- Architects: James Hume; Alexander Campbell

New South Wales Heritage Register
- Official name: Rosemont
- Type: State heritage (complex / group)
- Designated: 2 April 1999
- Reference no.: 294
- Type: Villa
- Category: Residential buildings (private)

Rosemont is a heritage-listed residence at 14 Rosemont Avenue, Woollahra, Municipality of Woollahra, New South Wales, Australia. It was designed by James Hume and Alexander Campbell. It was added to the New South Wales State Heritage Register on 2 April 1999.

== History ==
=== Alexander Campbell ownership ===
Rosemont was built around 1857 for Alexander Campbell, merchant banker and at one time a member of the New South Wales Legislative Council and his wife Harietta, who lived there. The stone was quarried in the grounds and Campbell was his own architect. Its cast iron came from the foundry of Peter Nicol Russell.

The garden was bounded by Trelawney Street and Ocean Streets and Edgecliff Road, reaching to Merioola. It was not till many years later, when the property was subdivided, that Rosemont Avenue was created.

It had a large stone-flagged courtyard with numerous offices surrounding it.

Woollahra Council was established in 1860. As rates increased and the need for more houses arose, Campbell began to lease some of his garden to various friends. Kalingra Cottage was built by Maclean, whose wife was a Campbell, Kelston by Mrs Dunsmuir, Harll by Mr Trebeck and Lillingston by Mr Caird, whose daughter married a son of Alexander Campbell. Eylstan was a big house on the corner of Trelawney Street built by Miss Cook, and was a school for girls; later the Gilchrist family lived there, and Mr Marks, who also built Trelawney. The terrace to the north of Rosemont gates dates from about 1860, and at one time Mme. (opera diva, Nellie) Melba lived in one of the houses, and all the neighbours could enjoy hearing that exquisite voice trilling scales. Each gate is flanked with miniature stone pillars and the Rosemont entrance of curved stone walls leads to a long, tree-shaded, avenue, one of the few relics of the past.

In 1879 Lord Augustus Loftus, the new Governor of New South Wales, formally opened the Great International Exhibition in the Botanic Gardens. The Garden Palace was a large building which was entirely destroyed by fire in 1882. A big ball was given at Rosemont to entertain the Commissioners and various distinguished visitors. Eighteen thousand people attended the Exhibition on the opening day.

Rosemont was once 80 acres (mostly to the south of the house) with elaborate, highly structured gardens. Its gardener c. 1880s was Scot Alexander Grant. Grant was born in 1845 at Cullen, Scotland and served an apprenticeship in the gardens of Cullen House in Banffshire. Before migrating to Australia in 1878 he followed his profession in several Scottish gardens, including the Botanic Gardens in Edinburgh. Grant arrived in the colony in 1878 and worked first at Yaralla, Concord West for the Walkers for some considerable time, then at Rosemont, Woollahra for Alexander Campbell MLC, then for Mr Tooth at the Swifts, Darling Point, which he planned and laid out. There is no record of where Grant was living while working at Yaralla and Rosemont, though from 1881 he lived at "Willow Cottage in Point Piper Road - west side (later Ocean Street), Paddington" until he moved to quarters in the Botanic Gardens, Sydney in 1882 for work there. It is likely that the positions at Yaralla and Rosemont both included quarters for a single man and that only after he married Margaret Stevenson in January 1880 was he obliged to find alternative accommodation (Willow Cottage).

Alexander Grant died on 8 November 1891 aged 80. His widow died in London on 8 May 1904 aged 72. Rosemont house is surrounded by other houses built after a 1912 subdivision. The house survives but is surrounded by other houses after its 1912 subdivision.

Subsequent owners included the Hon. J. T. Walker, Sir Charles and Lady Mackellar, the father of poet Dorothea McKellar; Sir Samuel and Lady Cohen; and Sir John Garvan. During Mrs J.T. Walker's regime at Rosemont all visitors came away with bunches of her lovely carnations (Dianthus caryophyllus cv's) or roses. She carried on the tradition of both the old gardens at Rosemont and Wallaroy, whose designers planted with such skill. In 1949 Rosemont was the home of Mr and Mrs Charles Lloyd Jones. By 1923 Charles Mackellar had resigned most of his business appointments as health and memory deserted him. He died at his residence Rosemont, Woollahra on 14/7/1926 and was buried in the Anglican section of the Waverley cemetery (Mitchell, 1986, in the Australian Dictionary of Biography). Russell (1980) adds Dorothea Mackellar lived for some time at Rosemont, Woollahra and from the 1930s at Cintra, Darling Point Road, Darling Point.

=== Sir Samuel and Lady Cohen ownership ===
Sir Samuel Cohen acquired Rosemont as the family home. His older son George was sent to a leading English public school. His younger son, Paul would have followed but for the war. In 1920 when their father's speculations in wheat futures went awry, George was recalled, and the Cohen brothers were enrolled instead in a new Sydney school, Cranbrook, Bellevue Hill.

Cohen became a member of parliament for a country seat. The family served charities, local community organisations and hospitals during their lifetime. Dr R.J. Pierce of Maitland Hospital Committee commented that few firms in the colony were as generous to charitable causes as David Cohen & Co. In 1888 Lewis Levy's family gave to Sydney the marble fountain topped by a bronze figure near the Woolloomooloo gates of the Botanical Gardens. George, Samuel and Neville all held office in the Great Synagogue of Sydney and the family exercised influential leadership in the small Jewish communities of Maitland and Newcastle. Samuel Cohen established the German Jewish Relief Fund which became the Australian Jewish Welfare Society and raised funds, with Commonwealth government support from 1938, to select and provide for deserving refugees to migrate to Australia.

Samuel Cohen, general merchant, migrated from England in the 1830s. His first store, in Campbelltown, failed. His second, in the Hunter Valley, prospered but only after he found a way to undercut his Sydney rivals: he chartered a sailing ship to carry 300 tonnes of merchandise from England up the Hunter River, landing it at Maitland. Cohen stores then followed in Newcastle and other regional centres. Eventually the family settled in Sydney. Successive Cohens joined boards of major companies and donated generously to charity.

Brothers David, Lewis and Samuel Cohen had arrived in Australia between 1831 and 1840. In 1835 Lewis and Samuel bought land in High Street, Maitland which later became the site of their warehouse. In 1836 Samuel opened a shop selling a wide variety of goods and known as Lambeth House. This was the beginning of the Cohen family company in Australia. In 1837 Lewis and Samuel established a business partnership. However, this only lasted until 1839. Samuel continued to trade in Maitland while Lewis set up business in Campbelltown and Sydney. In 1840 their first cousin, Lewis Wolfe Levy migrated to Australia. He lived briefly in Maitland before opening a successful store in Tamworth. Lewis returned to Maitland in 1854. The brother's business interests were consolidated between 1843 and 1845. Samuel Levy filed for insolvency in 1843 and his brother David took over the debts. In 1845 Lewis Levy joined the firm. David Cohen's name (the youngest brother) was given to the firm due to the quality of his reputation and the company became the largest firm in the Maitland district.).

Paul Cullen (later Major General Paul Cullen AC, AO, CBE, DSO & Bar, soldier, company director, pastoralist and Fellow of the Institute of Chartered Accountants) was Sir Samuel's great-grandson.

=== Sir John Joseph Garvan ownership ===
Sir John Joseph Garvan (1873–1927) followed his father into the insurance business. In 1897 he became general manager and a director of the Citizen's Life Assurance Co. Ltd, and in 1899, managing director. He helped the Australian Widows' Fund and the Mutual Life Association of Australasia by amalgamating them with the C.L.A. to form the Mutual Life and Citizens' Assurance Co. Ltd (MLC) in 1908. At a time when theoretical training in economics and allied subjects was meagre, Garvan proved a skilful, prudent and successful businessman, excelling in financial management. He kept the expenses of the MLC low and strengthened policy reserves; his control helped to turn the company into one of the main insurance groups in Australia.

Garvan was a benefactor of several charities, including the St Vincent de Paul Society. Like his father, he was a keen sportsman, especially interested in tennis and polo. Sometime vice-president of the New South Wales Polo Association, in the 1900s he played a reliable game at full back and was a member of a team that twice won the Countess of Dudley Cup; he donated the J. J. Garvan Cup which is still played for. He had a string of racehorses, including Braehead and The Pied Piper, but they had little success.

Garvan died of coronary vascular disease on 18 July 1927 at his home in Darling Point (Rosemont) and was buried in the Catholic section of South Head cemetery. He was unmarried. His estate was sworn for probate at A£156,558. The prime minister, S. M. (Viscount) Bruce, described him as "an outstanding figure in the business life of Australia, and one of its leading financial authorities".

=== Charles Lloyd Jones (1878–1958) ===
After the Mackellars, the Lloyd Jones family of retail renown owned and lived at Rosemont until 1981. Mrs Hannah Benyon Lloyd Jones (d.1982) was the youngest of thirteen children of a Welsh steelmaker and was described in her son's obituary as "a force of nature...Lady Bracknell played by Edith Evans...". She married Charles Lloyd Jones in Chicago in 1929, a week after his divorce from his second wife in Reno, Nevada. In 1932 they purchased Rosemont, Woollahra's grandest house, from the family of Dorothea Mackellar. It was to remain in the Lloyd Jones family for 50 years as a centre of the most august social activity in Sydney's history, outside Government House. The Lloyd Joneses also bought Summerlees at Sutton Forest in 1937, taking up residence for the summer there in 1937–38. Then they came regularly with their two young sons, David and Charles.

At Rosemont the Lloyd Jones' frequently entertained politicians and overseas visitors. (Sir) Robert Menzies was a close friend. A veteran sailor and member of the Royal Sydney Yacht Squadron from 1903, Charles Lloyd Jones was rear-commodore in 1906-08 and commodore in 1949–55. He was a founder of the Rotary Club of Sydney in 1921 and a member of the Australian, Athenaeum and Royal Sydney Golf clubs. Knighted in 1951, he was appointed officer of the Légion d'honneur in 1954. Sir Charles died at Rosemont on 30 July 1958 and was cremated after a service at St Andrew's Cathedral when Menzies gave the funeral oration.

The original property of 80 acres (mostly to the south of the house) has been reduced to less than 1 acre. The original entrance was from Ocean Street, but that section of garden and drive was subdivided off in the 1970s. Its most recent subdivision occurred in c. 1980 when apartments (Rosemont Gardens) were constructed along the former drive, west of the house to Ocean Street.

Louise Warren (1927-2013) was officer-in-charge of the National Trust of Australia (NSW) Women's' Committee House Inspections 1978–81. She organised the auction of the Lloyd-Jones collection (sold on the premises at Rosemont between 7/4/1981 and 10/4/1981). An illustrated edition of the collection (a four-page colour illustrated brochure by James R.Lawson P/L) exists documenting the event. Sir Raymond & Lady Burrell, guided initially by architect Espie Dods and landscape consultant Gai Stanton, have since then rearranged the house and garden with a revised entry through a southern (formerly service) courtyard, which has been given formal emphasis by parterres and trellises. The main rooms have a northern outlook towards the harbour, now enhanced by an understated sequence: grass terrace by the house, stone steps, tennis court and swimming pool.

Old trees, including a bull bay evergreen magnolia (Magnolia grandiflora), and perimeter planting surround the area, while planted pathways run through the interior.

Charles Lloyd Jones, merchant and patron of the arts, was born on 28 May 1878 at Burwood, Sydney, son of native-born parents Edward Lloyd Jones (d.1894), draper, and his wife Helen Ann, née Jones, and grandson of David Jones. He was educated at the Manor House School, London, and Homebush Grammar School but showed little academic aptitude. In 1895 he attended Julian Ashton's art school and later the Slade School of Fine Art, University College, London. Failing in his ambition to exhibit at the Royal Academy of Arts, he gave up hopes of an artistic career, and qualified as a tailor and cutter in London. On 16 November 1900 when visiting Sydney he married Winifred Ethelwyn (d.1916), daughter of Dr Frederick Quaife and granddaughter of Rev. Barzillai Quaife, at Trinity Congregational Church, Strathfield; they were childless.

On his return to Sydney in 1902, Jones worked in David Jones' clothing factory before transferring to the advertising department. His creative flair and awareness of American trends were recognized and by 1905 he was advertising manager. When David Jones Ltd became a public company in 1906, he was appointed a director and was chairman in 1920–58. Under his guidance the firm prospered and expanded: a second store in Elizabeth Street was completed in 1927 (which benefited from the nearby St James station) and a third on the corner of Market and Castlereagh streets was opened in 1938 to mark the firm's centenary. The first interstate extension came in 1953 with the acquisition of Bon Marche in Perth.

A staunch advocate of free enterprise, Jones prided himself that David Jones was a "store with a soul", dedicated to customer service, responsible to its shareholders (who regularly received a ten per cent dividend) and to its staff. Strict when necessary, Jones was approachable and a ready listener; his paternalistic care for staff and his quiet courtesy won him respect and loyalty. Among other public positions Jones was treasurer of the Sydney Chamber of Commerce (1915–16), president of the Retail Traders' Association of New South Wales (1915), the Australian division of the Chartered Institute of Secretaries and of the Kindergarten Union of New South Wales, a founder and director of the board supervising the Australian National Travel Association, chairman of the Cancer Appeal Fund and member of the University Cancer Research Committee. A director of radio station 2BL, he was appointed first chairman of the Australian Broadcasting Commission in May 1932. He hoped to found a national orchestra and wanted the A.B.C. to follow "in the footsteps of the British Broadcasting Corporation" with programmes that would be popular as well as cultural. Educational broadcasts and concerts began, but striking a balance between ideals and resources proved difficult. Conflict over content and disunity in the administration, coupled with the death of his brother and Depression business worries, led him to resign in 1934.

At Auckland, New Zealand, on 29 October 1917 Jones had married Louise Violet Multras (d.1973). He divorced her at Reno, Nevada, United States of America, on 19 July 1929 and at Chicago on 25 July he married Hannah Benyon Jones (d.1982) of Sydney. From the early 1930s they lived at Rosemont, Woollahra, where they frequently entertained politicians and overseas visitors. (Sir) Robert Menzies was a close friend. A veteran sailor and member of the Royal Sydney Yacht Squadron from 1903, Jones was rear-commodore in 1906-08 and commodore in 1949–55. He was a founder of the Rotary Club of Sydney in 1921 and a member of the Australian, Athenaeum and Royal Sydney Golf clubs and the Royal Automobile Club, London. Knighted in 1951, he was appointed officer of the Légion d'honneur in 1954.

Sir Charles died at Rosemont on 30 July 1958 and was cremated after a service at St Andrew's Cathedral when Menzies gave the funeral oration.

=== Sir Charles Kinnaird Mackellar (1844–1926) ===
Sir Charles Mackellar was a physician, politician and businessman. Only son of Frederick Mackellar (d.1863) physician, from Dundee, Scotland and wife Isabella, née Robertson, widow of William McGarvie. Educated at Sydney Grammar, Charles moved with his family to the Port Macquarie district c. 1860. He spent several years on the land before proceeding to Scotland to attend the University of Glasgow. Returning to Sydney he registered with the Medical Board of NSW on 25/3/1872. In 1873-7 he was honorary surgeon at the Sydney Infirmary and Dispensary (Sydney Hospital from 1881) where his father had been first salaried medical officer: (Sir) Henry Normand MacLaurin also joined the staff in 1873 and cemented one of the most important friendships of Mackellar's life. He was a physician at the hospital in 1882 and a director in 1884–1917. He worked "stupendously" at general practice in early years.

In September 1881 Mackellar joined the board, led by Dr Alfred Roberts, which was appointed to control the first serious smallpox epidemic in NSW, and was gazetted as the Board of Health on 6/1/1882. In July Mackellar became Government Medical Adviser, health officer for Port Jackson, chairman of the Immigration Board, and an official visitor to the hospitals for the insane at Gladesville & Parramatta. He was also ex officio emigration officer for Port Jackson, and a member of the Board of Pharmacy and the Medical Board. In July 1883 he campaigned for a federal quarantine system and was appointed president of the Board of Health in August. Contemporaries believed that Mackellar was solely responsible for the organisation of the department but he deferred to Roberts: "it is ratherthat I doggedly and persistently followed his lines than that I formulated any original scheme of my own" (the Mackellar motto was Perseverando).

Persuaded by the attorney-general W.B.Dalley, a private patient, Mackellar resigned his official appointments in August 1885 and was nominated to the Legislative Council to promote public health legislation he had helped to draft, but which lapsed with the resignation of the Stuart government in October. He was an ordinary member of the Board of Health until 1925. In 1886-7 as vice-president of the Executive Council and briefly secretary for Mines Mackellar represented the Jennings government in the Representative Council. He introduced the Dairies Supervision Act of 1886 which helped to reduce infant mortality. Except for October–November 1903, when he was appointed to the Commonwealth Senate, he remained in the council until 1925. In 1903-4 he chaired the Royal Commission on the decline in the birth rate, dominating its proceedings in a manner uncharacteristic of his usually careful approach to scientific enquiry.

In 1882-5 Mackellar had been a member of the State Children Relief Board. In 1902-14 he was president, and was identified with the Neglected Children and Juvenile Offenders Act (1905) which created children's courts and the probationary system. He was soon at loggerheads with his under-secretary Peter Board, largely over the extension of the Board's activities into areas not envisaged by its Act. Criticism, muted while Mackellar remained in office, became public not long after his departure.

Until at least 1912, Mackellar had been convinced that environmental factors determined the development of the young. Enquiries abroad leading to his report as Royal Commissioner on the Treatment of Neglected and Delinquent Children in Great Britain, Europe and America (1913) caused him to modify his views. With Professor D.A.Welsh he published an essay, Mental Deficiency (1917) advocating better training and care of the feeble minded, and suggesting their sterilisation on eugenic grounds. Mackellar consistently lectured and published pamphlets to propagate social reform. He was admired for his reluctance to align himself with any political faction, and for his unselfish devotion to the public interest. Knighted in 1912, he was appointed KPMG in 1916.

On 9/8/1877 Mackellar had married Marion (d.1933) daughter of Thomas Buckland. He acquired considerable pastoral interests and in 1896 succeeded his father-in-law as a director of the Bank of NSW, of which he was president in 1901-23 apart from absences abroad in 1904-5 and 1912–13. Mackellar was chairman of the Gloucester Estate Co. in its later years and succeeded MacLaurin as chairman of the Mutual Life & Citizens' Assurance Co. Ltd; he had been a trustee in 1911–14. He was also a director of Pitt, Son & Badgery Ltd.; the Union Trustee Co. of Australia Ltd.; United Insurance Co. Ltd.; Colonial Sugar Refining Co.; Australian Widows' Fund; and Equitable Life Assurance Co.Ltd. of which he was medical director. He was surgeon in the Volunteer Rifles from 1872; chairman of the medical section of the Royal Society of NSW in 1881; founding councillor and in 1883-4 president of the NSW branch of the British Medical Association; examiner in medicine at the University of Sydney in 1889–1901; vice-president and in 1907-14 president of the Sydney Amateur Orchestral Society; inaugural vice-president of the Royal Society for the Welfare of Mothers and Babies in 1918; and a member of the Australian and Athenaeum Clubs, Sydney.

By 1923 Mackellar had resigned most of his business appointments as health and memory deserted him. He died at his residence Rosemont, Woollahra on 14/7/1926 and was buried in the Anglican section of the Waverley cemetery. His estate, valued for probate at 39,205 pounds, was left in trust to his wife and on her death in 1933 to their surviving children Eric, Malcolm and Dorothea. His eldest son Keith Kinnaird had been killed in action in South Africa in 1900.

=== Isobel Marion Dorothea Mackellar (1885–1968) ===
Dorothea Mackellar was born at Dunara, Point Piper, Sydney, third child of native-born parents (Sir) Charles Kinnaird Mackellar and his wife Marion, daughter of Thomas Buckland. She was educated at home and travelled extensively with her parents, becoming fluent in French, Spanish, German and Italian, and also attended some lectures at the University of Sydney. Her youth was protected and highly civilised. She moved easily between the society of Sydney's intellectual and administrative elite, life on her family's country properties, and among their friends in London.

Mackellar began writing while quite young and surprised her family when magazines not only published but paid for her verses and prose pieces. On 5/9/1908 a poem, "Core of my heart", which she had written about 1904, appeared in the London "Spectator". It reappeared several times in Australia before being included as "My Country" in her first book, "The closed door, and other verses" (Melbourne, 1911). She published "The Witchmaid, and other verses" in 1914 and two more volumes of verse (1923 & 1926), also a novel "Outlaw's luck" set in Argentina. With Ruth Bedford, a childhood friend, she wrote two other novels (1912, 1914). During World War 1 and as a result of its frequent inclusion in anthologies, "My Country" became one of the best known Australian poems, appealing to the sense of patriotism fostered by the war and post-war nationalism.

Photographs of Mackellar in her twenties show her to have been then an ideal image of the Australian girl, pretty, sensitive, and fashionable. She was said to be a strong swimmer, a keen judge of horses and dogs. Her verse shows that she was cultivated and spirited, her novels that she was hopelessly romantic. Between 1911 and 1914 she was twice engaged. The first engagement she broke because the man was over-protective; the second lapsed through misunderstanding and lack of communication after the outbreak of war. Her writing, once the product of youthful passion and enthusiasms, became increasingly souvenirs of travel or dependent on nature for inspiration. She was unable to write of her disappointment in love except in powerful translations from little-known Spanish and German poets.

Despite her "loathing all restrictions and meetings" Mackellar was honorary treasurer of the Bush Book Club of NSW and active in the formation in 1931 of the Sydney P.E.N Club. She became responsible for her aging parents, and apparently wrote little after her father's death in 1926. Her mother died in 1933 and Dorothea, "a not particularly robust dormouse", was frequently in poor health, spending ten years in a Randwick nursing home. Yet she outlived her younger brothers and was able to keep both Cintra, Darling Point, and a house at Church Point on Pittwater. She was appointed OBE just before she died on 14 January 1968 in the Scottish Hospital, Paddington, after a fall at home. She was cremated after a service at St. Mark's Anglican Church, Darling Point and her ashes laid in the family vault in Waverley Cemetery. Her estate was valued for probate at over $1,580,000.

H. M. Green describes her as a "lyrist of colour and light" in love with the Australian landscape. She herself 'never professed to be a poet. I have written - from the heart, from imagination, from experience "some amount of verse". Privileged and unusual, she was also typical of many Australian women of her generation in the contrast between the inspired vigour of her youth and the atrophy of her talent and vitality through lack of use.

== Description ==
Site and garden

Rosemont was once many acres in extent with elaborate, highly structured gardens. It is now a little less than 1 acre divided approximately 60:40 between grounds and house. The garden is formal with a 3-tier fountain dominating a circular carriage drive in front of the house. The grounds include displays of roses, azaleas, large camphor laurels (Cinnamommum camphora) and fig (Ficus sp.) trees on the boundaries.

The original property of 80 acres (mostly to the south of the house) has been reduced to less than 1 acre. The original entrance was from Ocean Street, but that section of garden and drive was subdivided off in the 1970s. Its most recent subdivision occurred in c.1980 when apartments (Rosemont Gardens) were constructed along the former drive, west of the house to Ocean Street.

Sir Raymond & Lady Burrell, guided initially by architect Espie Dods and landscape consultant Gai Stanton, have since then rearranged the house and garden with a revised entry through a southern (formerly service) courtyard, which has been given formal emphasis by parterres and trellises. The main rooms have a northern outlook towards the harbour, now enhanced by an understated sequence: grass terrace by the house, stone steps, tennis court and swimming pool.

Old trees, including an evergreen magnolia/bull bay (Magnolia grandiflora), and new perimeter planting provide privacy while planted "secret" pathways provide detail and interest.

House

Rosemont is a two-storey sandstone house of early Victorian character with an Edwardian character in the later additions. The external sandstone walls and chimneys are painted. The main roof is slate and the verandah roofs iron and copper. The main elevation is symmetrical with two bays projecting forward and an encircling cast iron Ionic colonnade from the Peter Nichol Russell Foundry. At the sides of the house there are balancing single storeyed verandahs supported on cast iron pilasters with frieze. The verandahs are sandstone flagged with some concrete sections. The eastern verandah has been extended to match the original.

Internally much original joinery survives, including six panelled doors and elaborate skirtings, but has been painted. Some marble fireplaces and some plasterwork survive, though substantial alterations are evident. The joinery is elaborate in the main rooms with breast panelling to the windows.

The main staircase and present entrance hall date from the twentieth century. An upper balcony has been formed above the present colonnade with 1880 balustrading. The house has 80 squares with ten bedrooms. A servants' wing extends to the north west and there are several other brick additions. A servants wing was built joining the main house to the original kitchen wing.

Servants Quarters & Courtyard

The house is separated from the servants' quarters and offices by a flagged sandstone courtyard. This was joined to the house in 1914 when a second storey was partially added to the rear section.

=== Modifications and dates ===
The grounds of Rosemont originally included most of the land now bounded by Rosemont Avenue, Trelawney Street, Ocean Street and Albert Street:

- There have been various twentieth century additions and alterations at the rear of the house, joining the originally detached kitchen block to the house. In 1914 a servants wing was built joining the main house to the original kitchen wing. The servants' quarters and offices were joined to the house in 1914 when a second storey was partially added to the rear section. The main stair would date from this period as would the creation of the present entrance hall from 2 rooms of the old house. The roof of the colonnade has also been changed to create a balcony (with 1880s balustrade).
- Internally much original joinery survives, including six panelled doors and elaborate skirtings, but has been painted. Some marble fireplaces and some plasterwork survive, though substantial alterations are evident. The main staircase and present entrance hall date from the twentieth century. A balcony has been formed above the present colonnade.
- 1970s the Lloyd-Jones family sold the western section of garden with driveway to Ocean Street for townhouse development.
- c. 1980 most recent subdivision & apartments (Rosemont Gardens) constructed along the former drive, west of the house
- January 2002 approval s.60 to partially demolish the upper (c.1980) brick section of an older stone boundary wall to the west of the house bounding Rosemont Gardens.

== Heritage listing ==
Rosemont was listed on the New South Wales State Heritage Register on 2 April 1999.

== See also ==
- Australian residential architectural styles
