= Moore Stairs =

Heritage-listed flight of stairs in Sydney, Australia

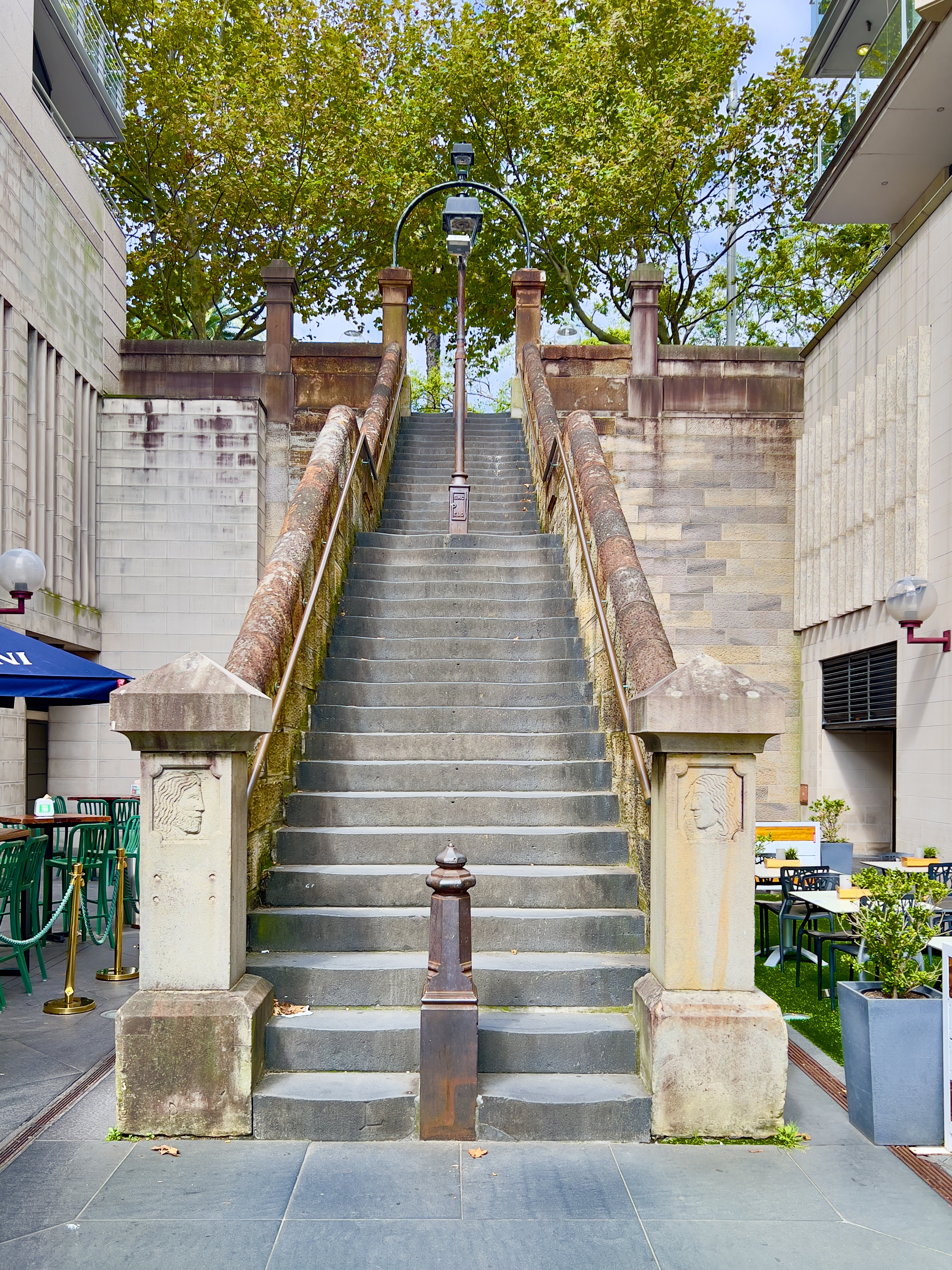
Moore Stairs (2023)

The Moore Stairs, (originally Moore's Stairs) also known as Moore Steps, are a NSW heritage listed public access flight of stairs which connect East Circular Quay with Macquarie Street in Sydney, Australia. Constructed in 1868 of Melbourne bluestone, they were named in honour of the city's mayor Charles Moore, and remain in use.

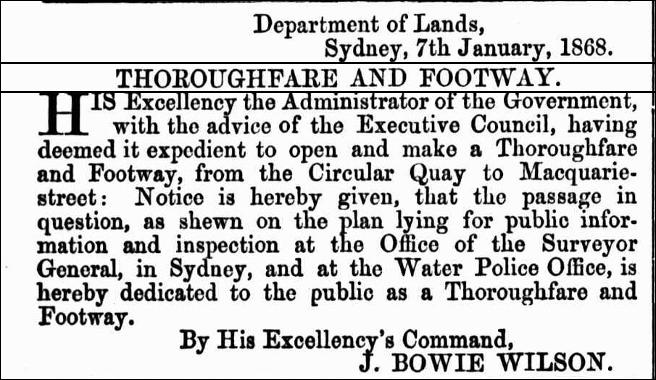
NSW Government Gazette notice of the reserving of the land as a public thoroughfare on 10 January 1868.

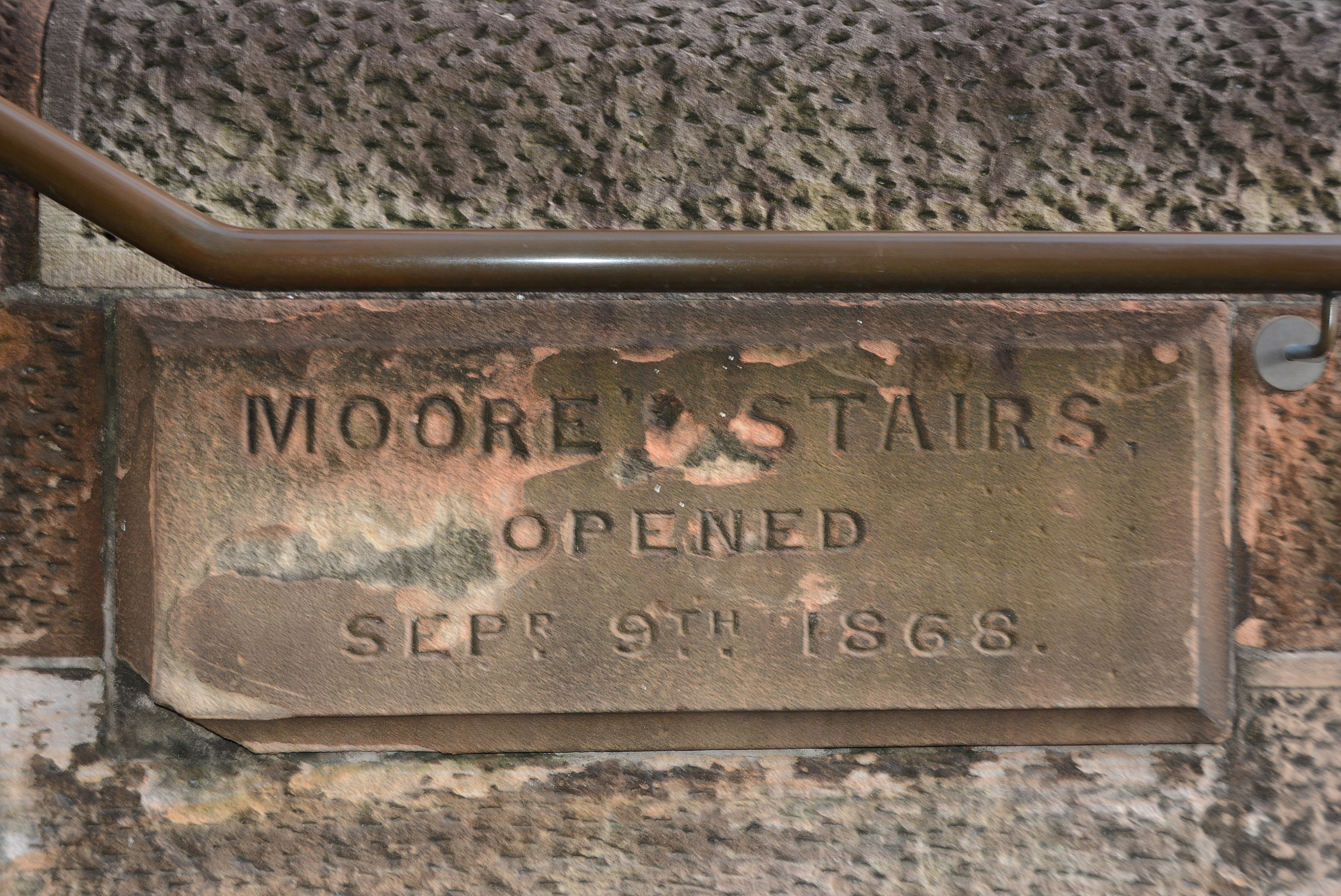
The dedication stone. Unveiled on September 9th, 1868.

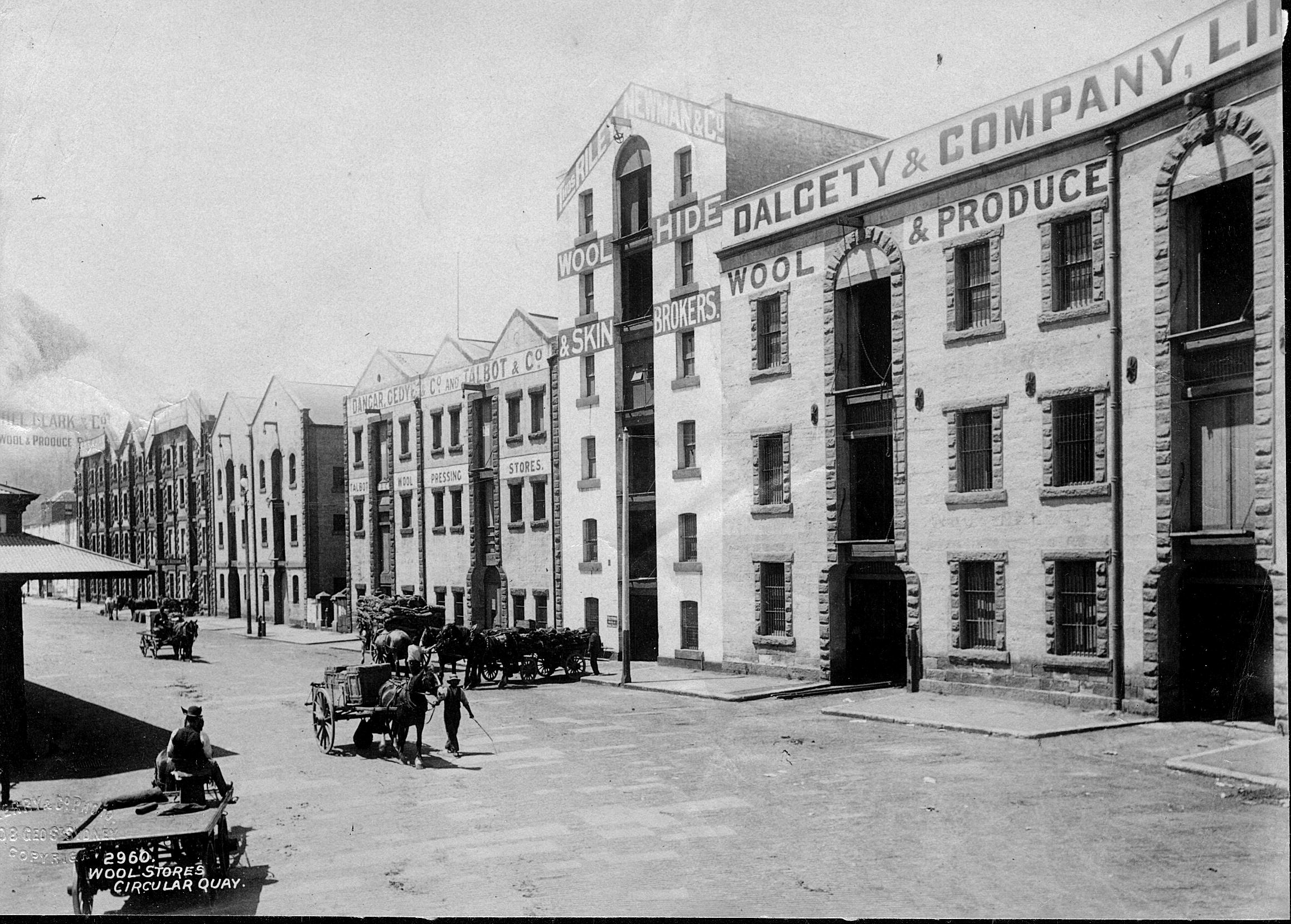
Talbot's woolstores and the stairs visible between them, 1890.

== Need for the stairs ==
By the 1860s, the difficulty of getting between the Tarpeian Way [the path along the top of the escarpment, now part of the Royal Botanic Garden] and the quay had "been the subject of loud complaint" for a number of years. The first design for the stairs, in a drawing by the City Engineer Edward Bell in 1866, shows a single flight of "bottom block Pyrmont stones" rising to a mid-landing where the stairway divides into two and rises in separate flights to Macquarie Street. The space between the flights held a wrought iron lamp frame and gas lamp. All three flights had a Sydney sandstone balustrade of ashlar blocks and topped with a half-round coping. The whole design was to be supported on sandstone arches and in an area 20 feet wide. A building contract was drawn up and signed in March 1867. However, a land ownership claim was raised by the Mr. Talbot, owner of the Talbot Stores buildings on either side. The dispute was resolved in January 1868 with the Government Gazette proclaimed the land as being "...dedicated to the public as a thoroughfare and footway".

An alternate design was then drawn up and again signed by Bell, with the material changing to a basalt, known as Melbourne bluestone, which was more hard-wearing than the soft Sydney sandstone. The stairs today are this second design–consisting of a single straight flight with an intermediate landing–although they have undergone several restorations and the width of the space either side has been increased.

== Opening ==
In the presence of the city aldermen and other dignitaries, the public stars were officially opened at half-past twelve on Wednesday, 9 September 1868 by the Mayor Charles Moore,

In order that what I say may not be misunderstood, or inadvertently misrepresented, I have written down what I propose to say in opening these stairs. In July 1866, the ground on which these stairs are erected was pointed out to me as public property. It was then fenced in, and had been used as a lumber yard by Messrs. Talbot for seven or eight years. Had I not done my duty to the city it would have been a lumber yard still, and the public deprived of a very convenient thoroughfare. Lawsuits followed, and obstacles were thrown in the way, but all the difficulties have at length been removed. I have the pleasure of declaring 'Moore's Stairs' opened for traffic.

A bottle was thereupon smashed by the Mayor "in the most approved orthodox manner", followed by three cheers for the queen and three for the Mayor. The party then departed to a ceremonial planting of trees in Moore's Park (also named in his honour). The events were reported seriously, and satirically, in the local papers. Both the stairs, and the park, are now commonly known as Moore, not Moore's.

== Maintenance ==
Having completed its construction, the Sydney Municipal Council was responsible for the stairs' maintenance. They received various official complaints about the need for cleaning, barricading against rough sleeping, and for the removal of refuse. Under the archways earth closets and a urinal were installed, and eventually, removed – after neighbour and former litigant Mr. Talbot complained they were a "criminal nuisance".

== Contemporary use ==
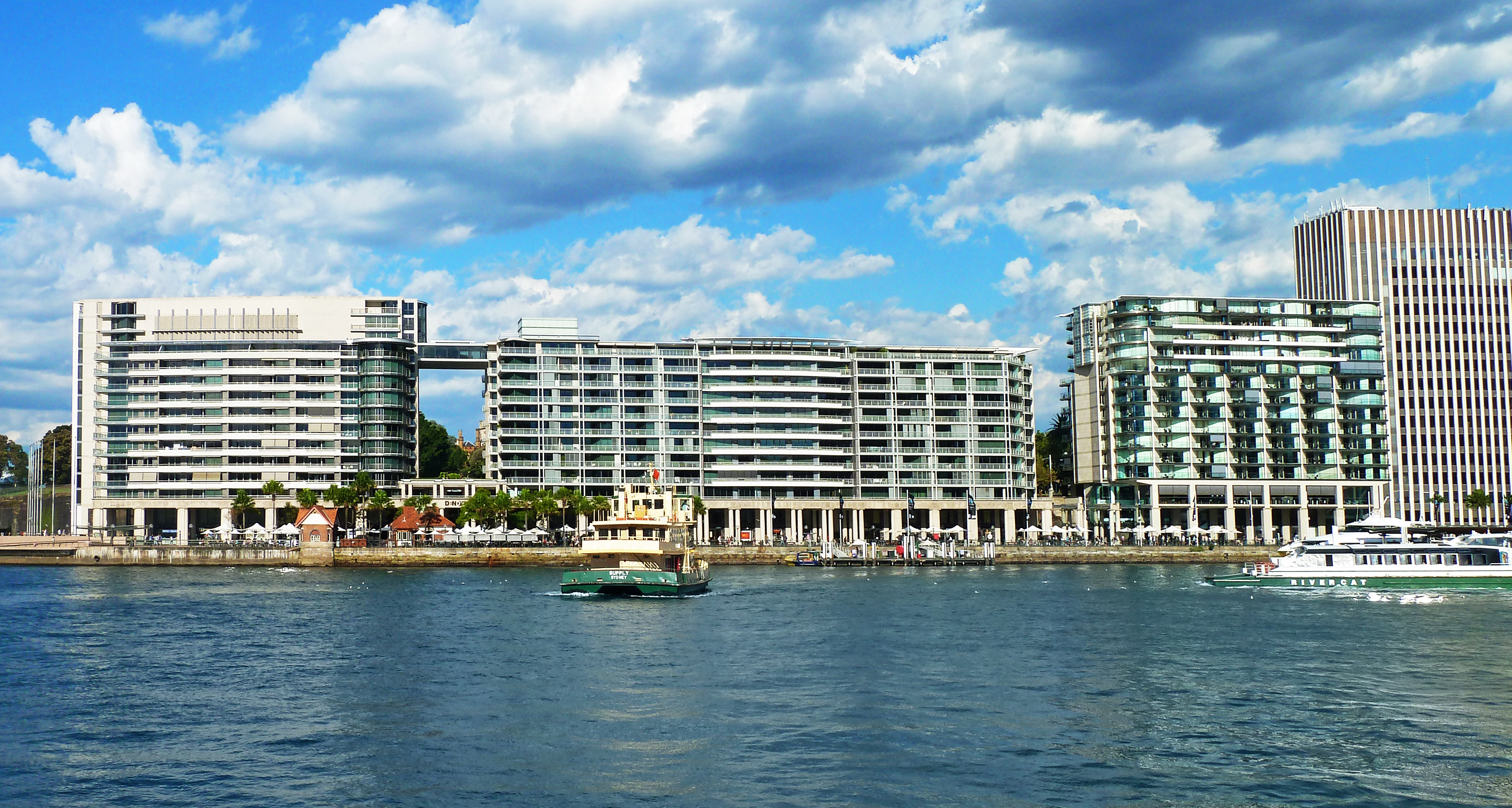
East Circular Quay and the Bennelong Apartments (2011). The Moore Stairs are visible between the central and right buildings.

The stairs remain today, delineating the boundary between two of the Bennelong Apartments buildings – 3-7 Macquarie Street, and 61 Macquarie Street – directly opposite the Museum of Contemporary Art and aligned with the ends of the Circular Quay ferry wharves. They are listed on the NSW Heritage register with the statement of significance that they provide "...a thin vista of Circular Quay in an otherwise impenetrable wall of buildings."
