= Dorothy Helmrich =

Australian mezzo-soprano and arts administrator (1889–1984)

Dorothy Helmrich OBE
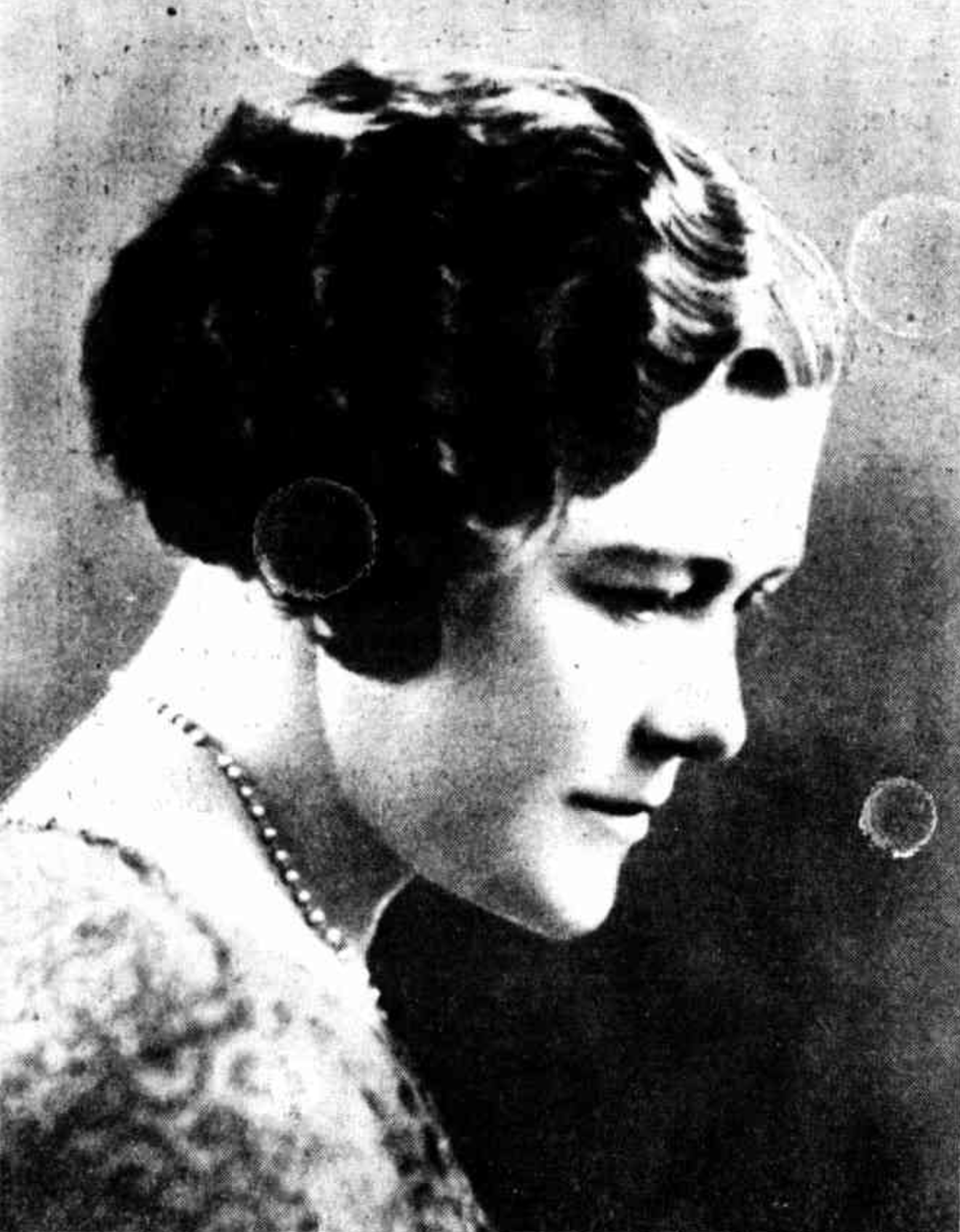
- Born: 25 July 1889; Woollahra, Sydney, New South Wales, Australia
- Died: 1 September 1984 (aged 95); Strathfield, Sydney New South Wales, Australia
- Education: Mosman Academy; Mosman Public School
- Alma mater: New South Wales State Conservatorium of Music; Royal College of Music
- Organization(s): Mosman Musical Society; Arts Council of Australia

Dorothy Jane Adele Helmrich OBE (25 July 1889 – 1 September 1984), known as Jane or Dot, was an Australian operatic mezzo-soprano and arts administrator. She was founder of the Arts Council of Australia.

== Biography ==
Helmrich was born on 25 July 1889 in Woollahra, Sydney, New South Wales, Australia. She was educated at Mosman Academy and Mosman Public School, while singing with the Mosman Musical Society.

Sponsored by a patron, Helmrich undertook singing lessons at the New South Wales State Conservatorium of Music (now called the Sydney Conservatorium of Music) with Stefan Mavrogordato and at the Royal College of Music in London, England with George Henschel.

In England, Helmrich débuted at Wigmore Hall and became a regular soloist at Sir Henry Wood's Promenade Concerts (now the BBC Proms). She was "acclaimed as a singer of the first rank" by London critics. Helmrich also toured in Europe. In 1929, she gave her first recital in Belfast. In 1936 she gave a recital at the Royal Academy of Music in Stockholm, Sweden.

In 1941, Helmrich's portrait was painted in an informal style by William Dobell. He submitted the painting for the Archibald Prize.

After returning to Australia, Helmrich continued her singing career. She gave recitals for the Australian Broadcasting Commission and performed at her alma mater the New South Wales State Conservatorium of Music. She toured to Java, Singapore and New Zealand.

In 1943, Helmrich founded and chaired the Encouragement of Music and the Arts (CEMA), modelled on the Arts Council of Great Britain. The CEMA became the Arts Council of Australia. In 1947, she secured a grant of £600 for Council from the advisory board of Adult Education. She was president of the New South Wales division until 1963 and published The First Twenty-Five Years: A Study of the Arts Council of Australia in 1968.

When Queen Elizabeth II visited Australia on Royal Tour in 1954, Helmrich commissioned a gala performance at the Tivoli Theatre for her entertainment.

Helmrich was awarded the Society of Artists’ medal in 1955 and was appointed as an Officer of the Order of the British Empire in 1959.

Helmrich died on 1 September 1984 in Strathfield, Sydney, New South Wales, Australia, aged 95.
