= Waimea House =

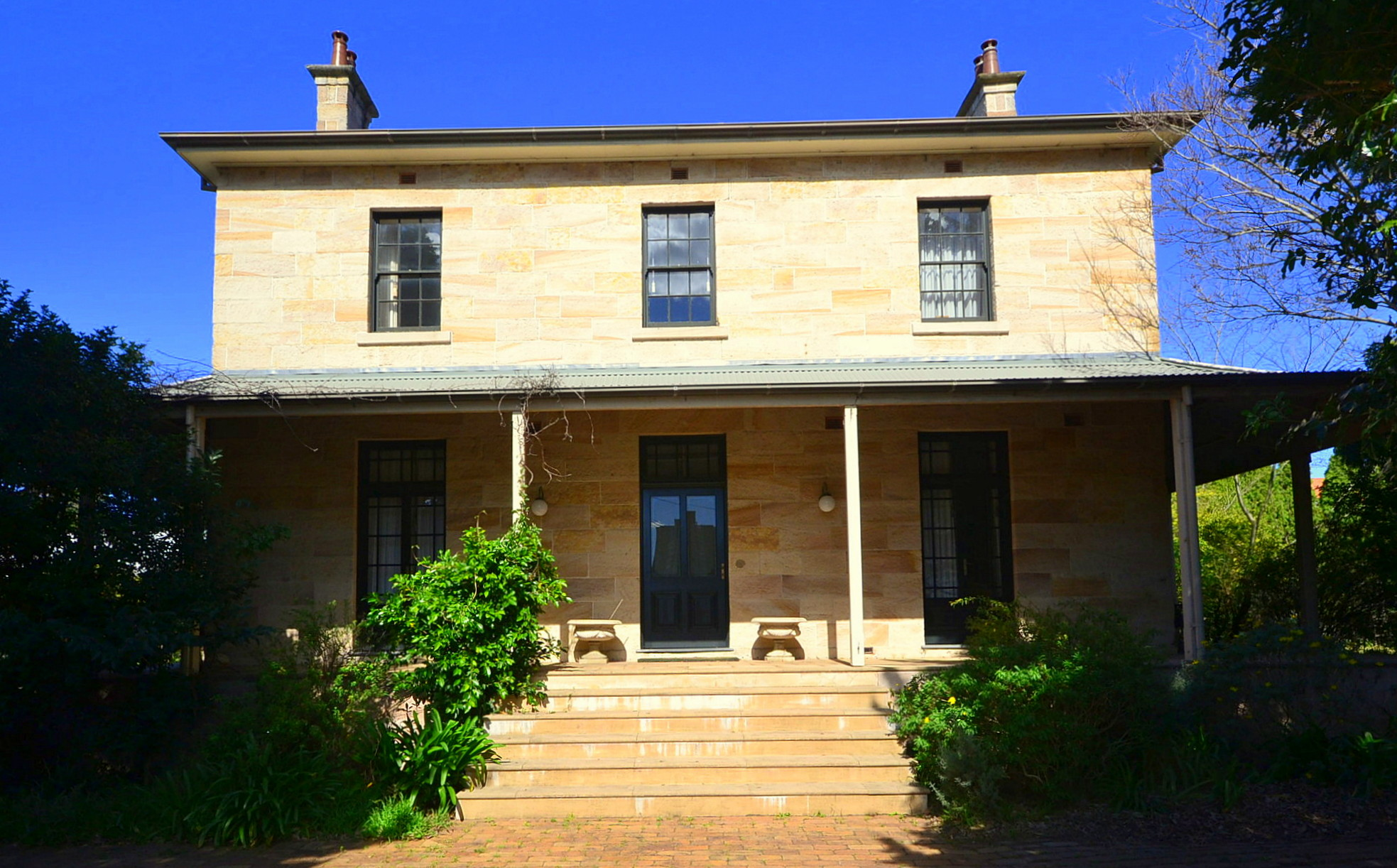
- Waimea House, in September 2014

- Location within Sydney Location within Australia
- 33°53′19″S 151°14′29″E
- Location: Waimea Avenue, Woollahra, New South Wales, Australia

History
- Built: 1858

New South Wales Heritage Register
- Official name: Waimea House; Helen Keller House
- Type: State heritage (built)
- Designated: 2 April 1999
- Reference no.: 226
- Type: House
- Category: Residential buildings (private)

Waimea House is a heritage-listed residence located at Waimea Avenue, Woollahra, New South Wales, Australia. It was built during 1858. It is also known as Helen Keller House. The property is privately owned. It was added to the New South Wales State Heritage Register on 2 April 1999.

== History ==
Waimea formed part of the original grant to Captain John Piper in 1820, who later sold to Daniel Cooper and Solomon Levey in 1830. Cooper & Levey's land holding was massive and they ran a renowned mercantile firm in early Sydney. The land then passed into the hands of Sir Daniel Cooper, the first Speaker of the Legislative Assembly of NSW and the builder of Woollahra House on Point Piper. The foundation stone of Woollahra House was laid by Governor Denison in 1856 and in the same year Cooper leased the land on which Waimea House was to be built by Thomas Wheaton Bowden, who, according to Sands Directory, operated as a broker in Castlereagh and Ocean Streets.

Bowden built a late Georgian Revival style house c. 1858 on this part of the Daniel Cooper estates. A famous tenant was Captain Robert Deane RN, a founder of the RAN House and a director of early shale oil mining companies and the Illawarra Steam Navigation Company. Deane died in 1893.

Waimea Avenue was a subdivision of Waimea estate, where a group of Victorian terraces (1-11, 9-14) was planned and built with good scale and picturesque detail. They group of seven terraces was built c. 1900 in Victorian (Picturesque) Gothic style on the west side of the street, being a mirror image of other terraces on the opposite side. These have an appropriate axial relationship to the early Waimea house at its southern end, which forms a pleasing termination to this important landscape vista.

The property was later leased to John Wood for 56 years until purchased by the Royal Blind Society. In 1949 the house was opened by the then Governor of New South Wales, John Northcott as the Helen Keller Hostel for Blind Women. The foundation stone to the hostel additions was laid by Helen Keller on 24 April 1948. The hostel was operated by the Royal Blind Society until it was sold in 1973. In March 1973, the RBS withdrew an application it had lodged with Woollahra Council to demolish the house and later actually attempted to demolish it. Local residents alerted the Builders Labourers Federation, which placed a "green ban" on the site and subsequently the RBS altered its plans and instead put the property on the market. It was purchased in 1978 by Park Investments P/L.

=== Conservation orders ===
ICO no. 37 was made in respect of the Waimea precinct on 24 August 1979. The order was gazetted over the subject precinct for the following reasons:

- Waimea House forms the nucleus of the precinct, being the most important element in the townscape, and historically provides a reference for the later subdivision pattern that evolved;
- the precinct contains a unique collection of 19th and early 20th century buildings of high architectural quality;
- Waimea and Woods Avenues and The Grove are good examples of Victorian human-scale civic design which respect in visual terms Waimea House;
- the precinct has been subject to much citizen response in both the threat of demolition to Waimea House itself and in terms of the high investment in the buildings made by individual owners.

None of the houses in the precinct have been demolished and most have been restored, which illustrates the social and economic recognition given to the area.

The subject building and the precinct have received continuous heritage recognition from Woollahra Municipal Council, the National Trust of Australia (NSW), the Queen Street and West Woollahra Association and the Heritage Council of NSW.

The Council has had continuing negotiations with various owners for the sympathetic redevelopment of the site. It was only through the action taken by the Builders' Labourers' Federation with the imposition of a "Green Ban" that total demolition was halted on 13 March 1973. The National Trust (NSW) subsequently listed all buildings in the precinct. Woollahra Council adopted the Woollahra Western Zone Area Action Plan on 28 April 1980 adopted the same general approach to this area as it takes in Paddington Conservation Area. Council subsequently supported conservation objectives for this precinct by reducing the density of potential development for the area in the proposed LEP for West Woollahra and including the lower density proposal in a proposed Conservation Area boundary in the same proposed LEP, which was submitted to the Department of Planning. It was expected that the LEP would be certified (gazetted) before the ICO on the precinct expired and that Woollahra Council would be the responsible authority for the precinct. In light of delays with gazetting the LEP, the Heritage Council of NSW resolved to take action under section 36 of the Heritage Act 1977 to place a permanent conservation order on Waimea House individually, due to its particular heritage significance and state of repair.

== Description ==
Setting

The house forms a pleasing termination to the important Victorian landscape vista of Waimea Avenue. It is the key building within this precinct and is the focus of a number of arresting vistas from the surrounding precinct. Waimea Avenue comprises a group of Picturesque Gothic style Victorian terraces (1-11, 2-12) planned c. 1900 with good scale and picturesque detail that have an appropriate axial relationship to the early Victorian house at its southern end, Waimea. It is also still spatially related to other Victorian terraces in Woods Avenue on the east side of the street at the rear of Waimea.

Site

The parcel of land on which Waimea stands has frontage to Waimea Avenue.

Garden

Waimea is surrounded on three sides (west, north, east) with garden. Golden Monterey cypresses (Hesperocyparis macrocarpa "Aurea" form a shelter belt along its northern boundary, and other trees and shrubs are arrayed around the house, along with lawns.

House

Waimea is a two-storey sandstone late Victorian Georgian Revival dwelling built in 1858. It has lost most of its fittings, only the basic stone walls, roof structure and chimneys remaining. It originally contained twelve rooms. A good example of a late Georgian Revival two-storey sandstone house, of symmetrical design with an elegant cast iron columned verandah to three sides. Sheeted iron roof. Waimea House is a good example of Victorian human scale civic design which reflects an earlier historic building in visual terms.

Elegant cast-iron columned verandah to three sides sheeted with curved iron, the main roof original slate, windows were either six-pane Georgian D.H. sash type or two-panel French window type, all shuttered. Doors were eight or four panels with retangular transom panels while internal joinery was standard polished cedar and imported marble chimney pieces.

=== Condition ===
As at 30 April 2013, the building has lost most of its "fittings", only the basic stone walls, roof structure and chimneys remaining. It is common ground that these are structurally stable and capable of restoration in accordance with available documentary evidence.

=== Modifications and dates ===
c. 1900 subdivision to create Waimea Avenue, with small terrace housing. Two sandstone gateposts located at Wallis Street on either side of the corner of Woods Avenue may relate to the former Waimea estate possibly formed part of the estate of Waimea House. The gate posts are at the rear of Waimea [Libby Maher].

== Heritage listing ==
Waimea House was listed on the New South Wales State Heritage Register on 2 April 1999.

== See also ==
- Australian residential architectural styles
