= John McGarvie Smith =

Australian scientist

- Born: 8 February 1844; Sydney, Colony of New South Wales
- Died: 6 December 1918 (aged 74); Sydney, New South Wales, Australia
- Scientific career
- Fields: metallurgy bacteriology

John McGarvie Smith (8 February 1844 – 6 September 1918) was an Australian metallurgist, bacteriologist and benefactor.

Smith married Adelaide Elizabeth née Hoalls on 7 July 1877, the widow of Daniel Deniehy, who died in 1908. Smith died at his home in the Sydney suburb of Woollahra of influenza. He was buried at the Waverley Cemetery.
