= Kenneth Shave =

Ken Shave, about 1941, by Official War Artist Ivor Hele

Lionel Kenneth Osborn Shave, OBE (28 September 1916 – 30 April 2009) was an Australian soldier, businessman, benefactor and patron of the arts. He served with distinction during the Second World War at Tobruk and in Palestine, attaining the rank of lieutenant colonel. He was present at the surrender of the Japanese First Army in the Pacific in 1945 and was appointed an Officer of the Order of the British Empire for his services in intelligence.

Shave's career encompassed whaling, mining and advertising. He had a lifelong interest in the theatre, becoming chairman of The Old Tote Theatre Company. He was a patron of the arts, a friend to many well-known Australian painters and councillor of The Arts Council of New South Wales.

== Early life ==
Lionel Kenneth Osborn Shave was born on 28 September 1916, the eldest child and only son of Lionel Charles Horace Shave and Doris Minnie Helena (née Long) in Mentone, Victoria, Australia. Shave had four sisters, Valerie, Helen, Penelope and Diana, of whom Helen died in infancy. At the age of five years Shave suffered osteomyelitis of the bone of his right arm. Rather than the usual procedure of amputation, Shave's surgeon, Frank Kingsley Norris, employing revolutionary surgical techniques, removed sections of the bones of the lower arm leaving Shave's right arm shorter and weaker, but with the hand functional. Shave went on to play cricket and later to gain a gunners certificate.

Shave was educated at Scotch College, Melbourne, and later at The Scots College, Sydney, where the family moved when Shave was about fourteen. He took a prize for Divinity but failed Geography by drawing a caricature of the Geography master on his exam paper. Shave's father, Lionel Shave, was a journalist, playwright and a founder of Australia's oldest advertising agency, originally Griffin, Shave and Russell, later George Patterson. The family members all had a love of the theatre and performed in a number of stage productions.

Shave's grandfather, Charles Osborn Shave, was Melbourne's leading couturier and it was anticipated that Kenneth would follow the family business. Returning to Melbourne, Shave discovered that he disliked ladies' tailoring. His grandfather was also interested in drilling for oil and Shave followed this interest. Together they drilled at Glenelg, Lakes Entrance and at Taranaki in New Zealand. His interest in the theatre led him to become a founding member of the National Theatre Movement of Victoria, where he was to meet his future wife, Phyllis Knight. As well as being involved in theatre management and stage production, he played a number of roles, including the dashing Robert Browning in The Barretts of Wimpole Street.

== Military service ==
Prior to the commencement of the Second World War in 1939, Shave joined the Victoria Scottish Battalion. At the outbreak of war, Shave presented himself to the medical tribunal headed by Major General Sir Frank Kingsley Norris who had saved his arm as a child, and who proudly pronounced him fit for military service. In 1940 he was posted to the Middle East with the 2/5th Battalion as an intelligence officer and was twice mentioned in despatches. He took part in the North African campaign of 1941, fighting "with skill and distinction" in the action which took Bardia from the Italians.

At Tobruk, Shave was wounded in a night action behind enemy lines. While he was hospitalised he bought a 9mm Beretta automatic pistol that had been taken from an Italian officer. After his return to the battlefront, a convoy in which he was travelling was ambushed by Germans who ordered the Australians from the vehicles. Shave lay on the floor of a vehicle, then used the souvenired pistol to rescue the other members of the party.

The battalion left Tobruk in 1942. On his arrival in Australia, Shave married Phyllis Knight. After a brief week's honeymoon Shave went to Toowoomba to assist in preparations for the New Guinea campaign in which he was attached to General Vernon Sturdee's intelligence corps. The Japanese later stated that they were amazed at "the extent of intelligence the Australians possessed on Japanese units, movements and personalities".

On 2 September 1945, the war ended. Shave was present with General Sturdee on board the aircraft carrier HMS Glory of the British Pacific Fleet when the Japanese General Imamura and Vice-Admiral Kusaka of the Japanese First Army surrendered Rabaul. Shave was appointed an Officer of the Order of the British Empire.

The Australian War Memorial holds a copy of Shave's memoirs: "The ramblings of a World War II army intelligence officer" by Lt-Col L. K. Shave OBE, ED. (Ret).

== Career ==
After the war Shave was invited to become military attache to the Australian Embassy in Nanking. This did not proceed, as Prime Minister Ben Chifley decided not to send military attaches. In 1948 he was offered a job with the United Nations in Kashmir but was unable to travel overseas at the time because of his wife's ill health.

He then joined Burns Philp & Co, and then a new company, Whale Products, becoming the general manager. A whaling station was established at Tangalooma Point on Moreton Island, soon becoming the most successful coastal whaling station in the world, and expanding its interests into mining, agriculture and a coffee plantation in New Guinea. The Australian whaling industry was closely controlled with quotas and seasons. Not so the whaling of some other countries, which brought about a sudden shortage of previously-numerous species, and the closure of the whaling station.

Shave then moved to Sydney, where he and Phyl lived at Darling Point with their two daughters, Margaret and Jillian. He worked for a time with George Pattersons advertising agency, then the construction and mining company McDonald Industries, and finally as a director of Robe River, retiring at 68.

== Patron of the arts ==
Shave grew up in a family that fostered an interest in the work of local artists. It became a lifelong interest of Ken and Phyl Shave to support Australian painters. Many well-known Australian artists such as the Blackmans, Margaret Olley and Cedric Flower became friends. Shave was a councillor on the Arts Council of New South Wales.

The Shaves also retained a lifelong interest in the theatre with Ken becoming chairman of the Old Tote Theatre Company. He was also a committeeman with the Lords Taverners and the honorary Librarian, historian and archivist of the Union Club, a role he held until the age of 91.
