= Regional Arts Australia =

Australian arts organisation

- Founded: 1966
- Type: Peak organisation
- VAT ID no.: ABN: 45 000 525 182
- Location: Melbourne, Victoria, Australia
- Region served: Australia
- Website: regionalarts.com.au
- Formerly called: Arts Council of Australia (1966–1998)

Regional Arts Australia is the national peak body for regional arts organisations throughout Australia. It was formed in 1966 as the Arts Council of Australia. It advocates better recognition and support for the regional, rural and remote arts sector in Australia. It initiates and manages projects to support regional artists, artsworkers and communities in arts practice, arts promotion and audience development in the regional and rural sectors.

== History ==
The origin of the Arts Council movement in Australia was the New South Wales based Council for the Encouragement of Music and the Arts (CEMA) formed in 1943 by the singer Dorothy Helmrich modelled on the British organisation of the same name. In 1947 the New South Wales Division of CEMA decided to change its name to the Arts Council of Australia (NSW Division) with a view to establishing a national body. Lack of funding delayed that vision being realised until 1966. Arts Councils were formed in South Australia (1946, lapsed in 1952 and reformed in 1965), Tasmania (1951), the Australian Capital Territory (lapsed in 1952 and reformed in 1962), Queensland (1961), Victoria (1969), the Northern Territory (1967) and Western Australia (1973). In 1998, the organisation changed its name to Regional Arts Australia.

In 2021, the organisation switched from a member-based structure to being led by a board of directors.

== Alliances and associations ==
In 2003, it joined with four other peak industry bodies, the Federation of Australian Historical Societies, Museums Australia, the Australian Council of National Trusts, and the Australian Library and Information Association, to form The Regional Cultural Alliance in order to "help regional artists gain greater access to skills development and training as well as present a united front when lobbying government ... to better co-ordinate existing programs for cultural development in the regions and recognise the economic opportunities art and culture create for regional centres."

== See also ==
- Kenneth Shave
