= Andrew Andersons =

Australian architect

Andrew Andersons AO
- Born: 5 July 1942 (age 84); Riga, Latvia
- Citizenship: Australian
- Education: University of Sydney; Yale University
- Occupation: Architect
- Spouse: Sarah Bennett
- Children: Bridget Andersons, Sybil Andersons
- Practice: New South Wales Government Architect Office; Peddle, Thorp and Walker

Andrew Andersons AO (born 5 July 1942) is an Australian architect. Buildings he has designed include various extensions to art museums, a number of theatres and concert halls as well as public, commercial and residential buildings.

== Background ==
Andersons was born in Riga, Latvia and his family settled in Australia in August 1949. He was educated at Sydney Boys High School, University of Sydney (B.Arch University Medal 1964), and Yale University (M.Arch 1966). Andersons was made Officer of the Order of Australia in 1983 for services to architecture and is a Life Fellow of the Australian Institute of Architects.

== Career ==
=== Professional experience ===
From 1959–1963 he was a trainee in the NSW Government Architects office and in 1966–1967 worked in the office of Arup Associates in London. From 1966 to 1988 he was again with the Government Architects office, becoming Assistant Government Architect in 1984 and offered the position of Government Architect in 1988. He did not accept this position when informed by the Minister for Public Works, Wal Murray, of the newly elected coalition government's intention to change the office to a small management agency. In 1989 he became a Director of Peddle, Thorp and Walker, now PTW Architects, retiring in 2013.

Andersons is now a freelance architectural design consultant. In the early 1980s and in 1989–90 he was a visiting Professor of Architecture at the University of New South Wales (UNSW).

=== Projects with the NSW Government ===
In the late 1960s Andersons was responsible for the Captain Cook Wing of the Art Gallery of NSW and Parramatta Court House and Police Station.

Between 1972 and 1985 as Principal Architect Special Projects, later Assistant Government Architect, he was responsible for the NSW Parliament House Project, additions to the State Library of NSW, the Ryde College of Catering and Hotel Administration and Riverside Theatres Parramatta as well as a number of regional art galleries.

From 1984–1988, he led a team of architects and consultants on the upgrade of the public realm of Macquarie Street and Circular Quay, including the design of the Sydney Opera House forecourt and lower concourse. At the same time he was involved with the initial planning of the Darling Harbour Project as well as writing the brief and superintending upon the design and construction of the Sydney Entertainment Centre (now demolished).

=== Projects with Peddle Thorp & Walker ===
- Quadrangle Building, UNSW
- Redevelopment of East Circular Quay
- Walsh Bay Redevelopment, Roslyn Packer Theatre
- Jones Bay Wharf
- Woolloomooloo Finger Wharf
- Darling Island Redevelopment
- Angel Place Offices and City Recital Hall
- Lend Lease Offices, 30 The Bond Sydney
- Vero Building, Auckland
- Additions to Art Gallery of South Australia
- New entrance and Indigenous Art Wing, National Gallery of Australia
- Heide Gallery, Melbourne
- Additions to Ballarat Gallery
- City of Sydney Library, Customs House
- Redevelopment of Inveresk railroad yards, Launceston, for Queen Victoria Museum and University of Tasmania.
- Restoration of the Capitol Theatre, Sydney
- Sydney Grammar School Concert Hall

Andersons has designed numerous apartment buildings including "The Forum", "Bennelong Apartments", "Quay Grand", "North", "The Bondi", "Pacific Bondi Beach", "No. 1 Onslow", "Kingston Waterfront" and "The Alexander".

Andersons has been involved with numerous masterplans, including: Sydney Olympics 2000; the Olympic Village; Channel 7 Site, Mobbs Lane, Epping; World Square site; and was a member of the Lend Lease bid team for Barrangaroo.

=== Awards ===
- Sir John Sulman Medal, 1975 and 1989 for additions to the Art Gallery of New South Wales whilst at the NSW Government Architect.
- Numerous Australian Institute of Architecture awards, State and National for architecture, interior and civic design.
