= Anchorage Capital =

Anchorage Capital may refer to:

- Anchorage Capital Group, an American company
- Anchorage Capital Partners, an Australian company
