= Erica Berchtold =

Australian businesswoman (born 1976)

- Born: 1976 (age 49–50)
- Occupations: CEO of David Jones, former CEO of Mosaic Brands
- Known for: First female CEO of David Jones
- Children: 3

Erica Berchtold (born 1976) is an Australian businesswoman. During her career, Berchtold has worked in many senior management positions, notably becoming the first female CEO of David Jones in June 2026.

== Career ==
Berchtold held numerous senior management positions before joining Super Retail Group, including national product management roles at Harvey Norman and general manager of two Women's clothing businesses for Specialty Fashion Group. She has also been a councillor on the board of the Australian Retailers Association, and is currently a board member of the Sydney FC A-League club, and president of the Australian Sporting Goods Association.

In 2023, she was voted third place in the Top 50 People in Ecommerce Awards, organised by Inside Retail. Berchtold was nominated for the NSW Women of the Year Awards in 2014 and InStyle Women of Style Businesswoman of the Year Award. Further, she was also named Michael Page Retail Executive of the Year in 2016.

=== Super Retail Group ===
Over a twelve-year period, Berchtold served as managing director of the sports division of Super Retail Group, including Rebel Sport, Amart Sports, Infinite Retail, and Goldcross Cycles. Over her tenure, Berchtold oversaw revenue increases ranging from AUD $600 million to AUD $1 billion.

=== The Iconic ===
In February 2019, following her employment at Super Retail Group, Berchtold assumed the position of CEO of online retailer The Iconic, superseding previous CEO Patrick Schmidt. Under Berchtold, the Iconic expanded beyond apparel, and oversaw the introduction of "Considered", an ethical means by which The Iconic's customers could shop by attributes like recycled materials or brands that provide donations to charitable causes. Berchtold was outspoken and critical of the federal government over JobKeeper payments during the COVID-19 pandemic, citing a lack of support for the retail sector, with The Iconic not meeting the required 30 per cent loss of revenue threshold to receive payments. She cited personal commitments for her eventual departure from The Iconic after four years, with Jere Calmes succeeding her as CEO.

=== Best & Less ===
Berchtold was set to become the CEO of Best & Less on September 4 2023, following on from Rodney Orrock, who stepped down due to health complications. Chair of Best & Less at the time, Jason Murray, said Berchtold was appointed following a global search for someone to fill the position, with Berchtold ultimately chosen due to her "track record of delivering profitable growth in a variety of retail markets" and "leadership skills". Her position at Best & Less would be paid AUD $816,903, including bonuses, and an AUD $180,000 sign-on incentive loan requiring repayment against any short-term bonuses up to 50% of her base salary. However, following an off-market takeover, businessman Ray Itaoui became CEO instead.

=== Mosaic Brands ===
In February 2024, Berchtold was appointed CEO of Mosaic Brands, the company behind clothing brands such as Noni B, operating 700 women’s fashion stores in Australia and New Zealand. Over the course of a year, Berchtold worked on saving the brand before its collapse.

=== David Jones ===
Before her appointment as CEO, Berchtold joined the department store in the newly created Chief Commercial Officer role, tasked with leading the "retailer’s value chain transformation program" and overseeing the Merchandise and Supply Chain. Berchtold assumed the position of CEO 2 June 2025, responsible for the retailer’s Merchandise and Supply Chain divisions eight months following on from Mosaic Brands' placement into administration. David Jones’ private equity owner Anchorage Capital stated that this move was part of a "planned transition" from former CEO Scott Fyfe, becoming the first female chief executive in David Jones' 188-year history. Berchtold plans to focus David Jones' efforts on fashion and online luxury growth, as well as cost efficiency and brand revitalisation under the execution of David Jones' five year transformation plan INSPIRE30. Berchtold's elevation to CEO means that for the first time, alongside Myer's CEO Olivia Wirth, Australia's two leading department stores are women-led. Her appointment corresponds with a new three-year loan of over AUD $200 million with restructuring specialist Hilco Capital.

== Personal life ==
Berchtold was born in 1976. She graduated from the Australian Institute of Company Directors. Berchtold is a mother of three and became CEO of The Iconic when she was five months pregnant. In 2019, Berchtold told the Australian Financial Review that she wanted to show women that they can "have these roles and have children".
