= Thomas Ahern =

Thomas Ahern may refer to:

- Thomas Ahern (businessman) (1884–1970), owner and manager of the Western Australian department store chain Aherns
- Thomas Ahern (rugby union) (born 2000), Irish rugby union player

== See also ==
- Thomas Ahearn, Canadian inventor and businessman
