= Lorna Jane =

Australian manufacturer and retailer of women's activewear

Coordinates: 27.4322855°S 153.0880405°E

Lorna Jane Pty Ltd

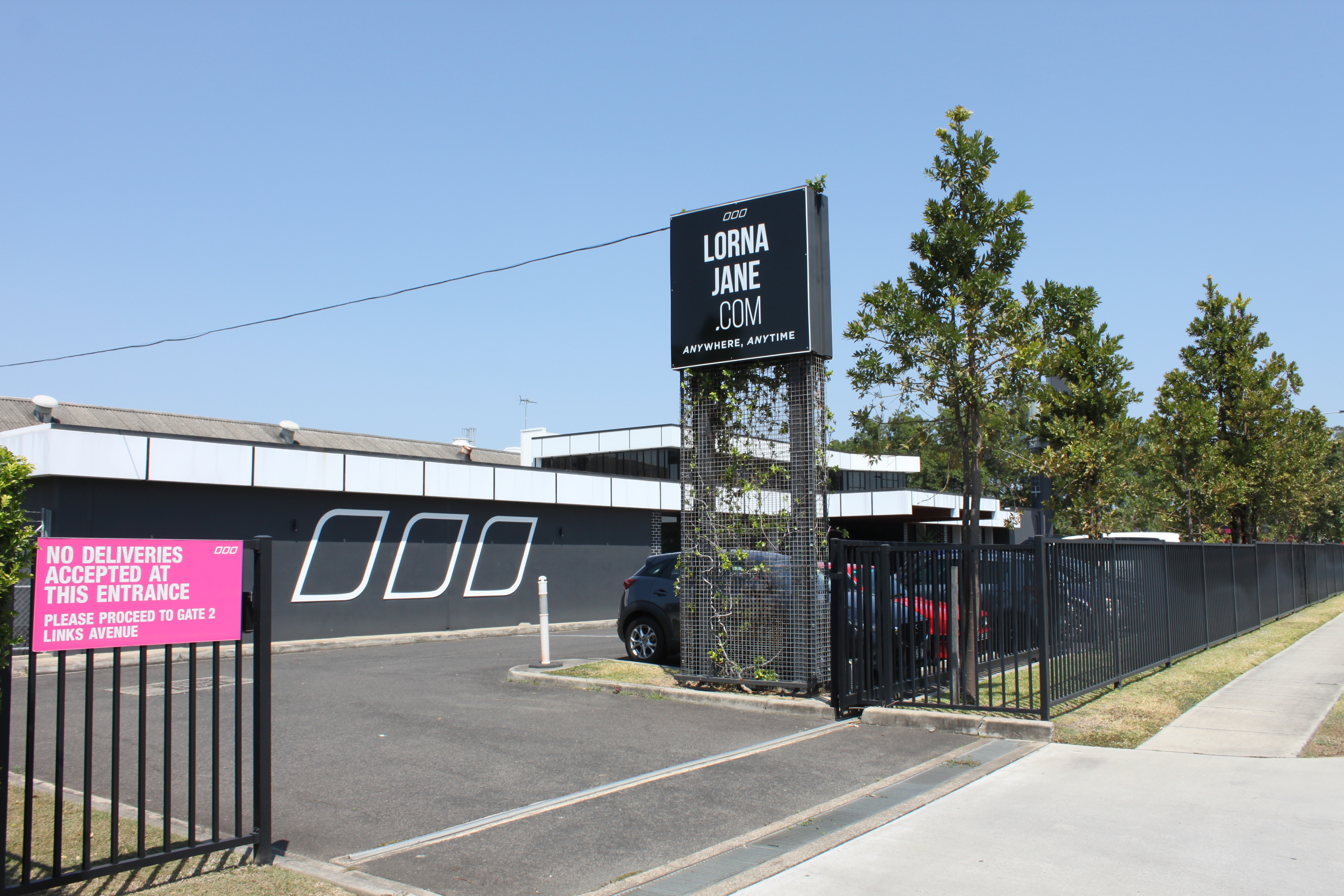
- Headquarters at Eagle Farm
- Type: Private
- Industry: Retail
- Founded: 1989
- Founder: Lorna Jane Clarkson and Bill Clarkson
- Headquarters: Brisbane, Queensland, Australia
- Number of locations: 116
- Key people: Lorna Jane Clarkson (Founder & Chief creative officer); Bill Clarkson (Founder)
- Products: Athletic apparel
- Revenue: AUD$ 223 million
- Owners: Lorna Jane Clarkson and Bill Clarkson
- Number of employees: 1,800 (2015)
- Website: lornajane.com.au

Lorna Jane is an Australian women's activewear brand headquartered in Brisbane, Queensland. The company was founded in 1989 by Lorna Jane Clarkson (née Smith) and her husband Bill Clarkson, with the first retail store opening in Brisbane's CBD in 1990. The brand is one of Australia's largest women's activewear retailers, operating 116 stores across Australia and New Zealand as of 2025.

The company is currently led by Chief Executive Officer Anna Fowler who was appointed in early 2023. The founder, Lorna Jane Clarkson has continued as Chief Creative Officer. The Clarksons have been the sole owners of the business since March 2020, when they reacquired a 40% stake previously held by private equity firm, CHAMP Ventures, for AU$28 million.

Lorna Jane has received recognition for its ethical manufacturing practices within the Australian fashion industry. In 2025, it became the first brand participating in Oxfam's 'What She Makes' campaign, to ensure all workers in the supply chain received at least a minimum wage. The company is a member of Seamless, an Australian clothing stewardship scheme. Baptist World Aid Australia's 2024 Ethical Fashion Report recognized Lorna Jane as the second most-improved brand among over 100 Australian fashion businesses, with a 20.3-point increase in its score since 2022.

== Products ==
Lorna Jane produces and sells a wide range of garments, including tights, sports bras, tops, shorts, pants, jackets and hoodies, shoes, and various accessories. The brand releases two new collections every month and maintains a year-round core "Essentials" range.

The company is well-known for its "Lotus Leggings", which have been produced in various lengths, including 3/4, 7/8, anklebiter, and full length. Body + Soul reported that a pair of Lotus Leggings was being sold approximately once every minute in 2023. In the 2024–25 financial year, Ragtrader referred to the "Thermal Leggings" as the company’s best-selling style, with approximately one pair sold every four minutes at peak.

== History ==
=== Foundation ===
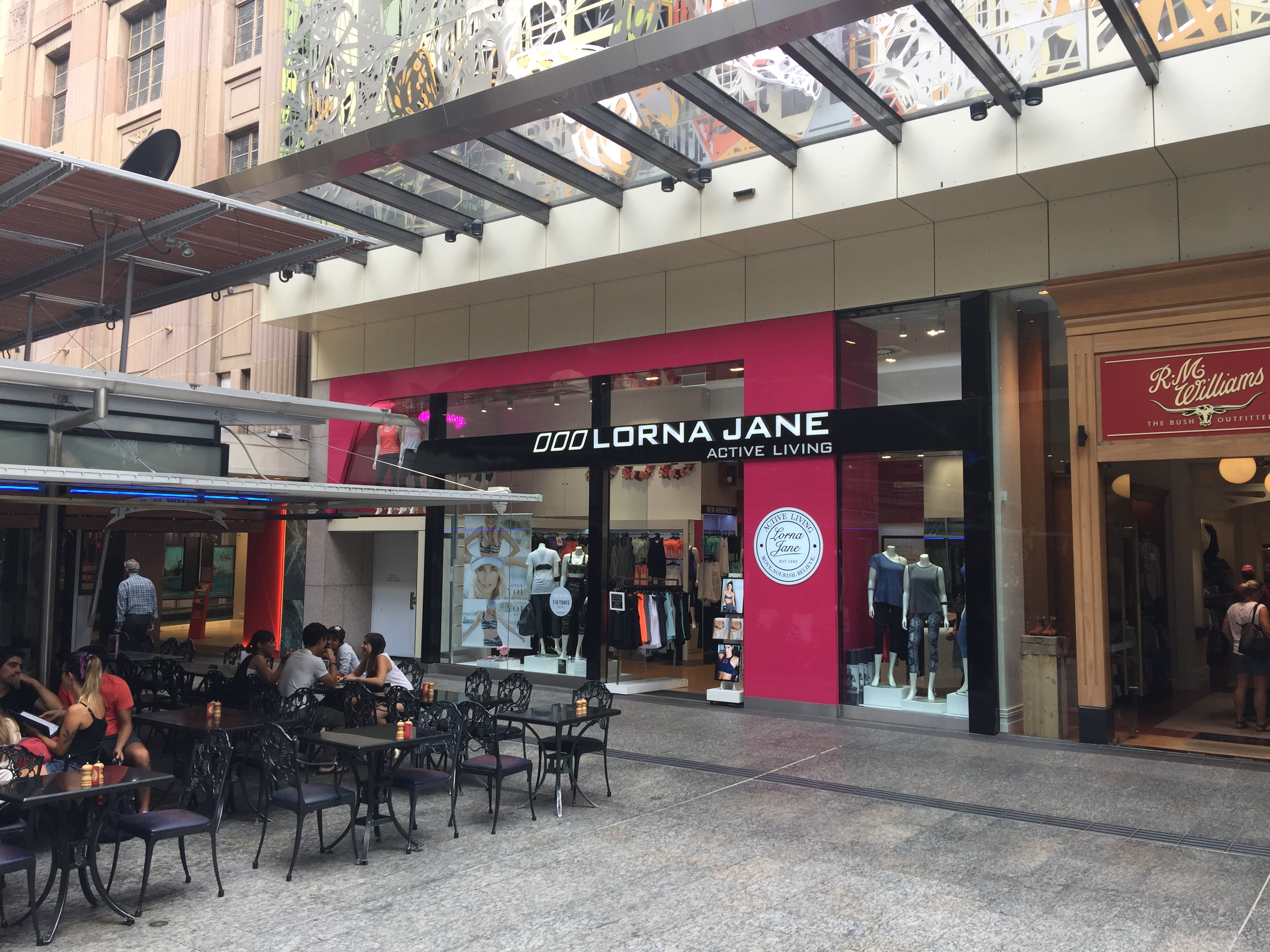
Lorna Jane shopfront in Brisbane's Queen Street Mall in 2017, close to the former location of the first Lorna Jane store

Lorna Jane Clarkson was born in Lancashire, England, in November 1964 and emigrated to Australia with her family as a child. Working as an aerobics instructor in Queensland during the 1980s, she found the available workout clothing unsatisfactory in both function and style, and began sewing her own activewear without formal training in garment production. After her students began requesting she make pieces for them, she and her husband Bill opened the first Lorna Jane retail store in 1990 at Broadway on the Mall in Brisbane's CBD.

While Clarkson has been credited with coining the term "activewear" in 1989, the Merriam-Webster Online Dictionary places the first known usage of the word in 1924.

The origin of the Lorna Jane logo: a stylized L and J

The company logo is three rhombi, each with two of its opposing corners curved. The shape represents a stylized "L" and "J" joined together.

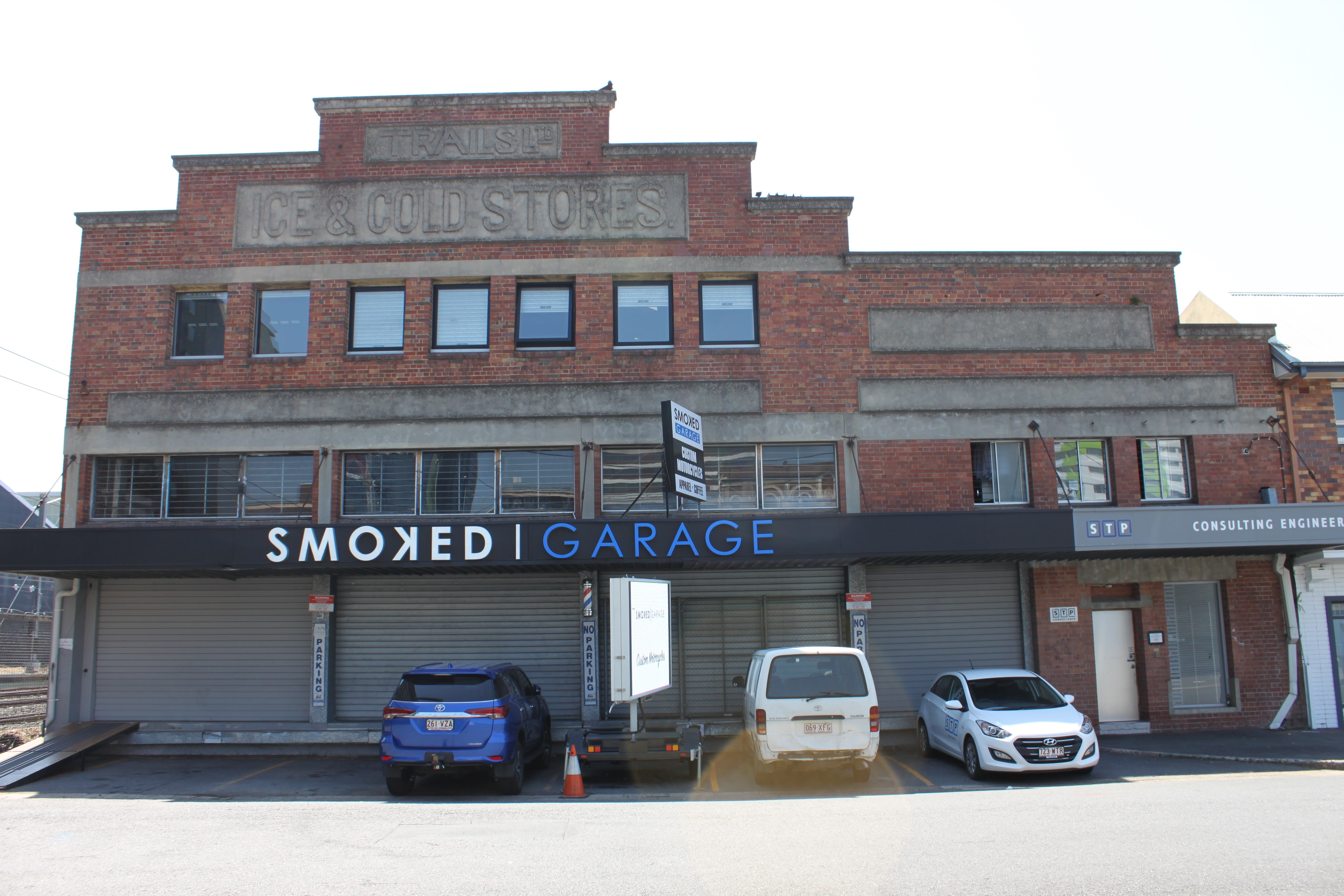
Lorna Jane's first factory building, at 99 Bridge Street, Fortitude Valley, Brisbane. In 2017, it is occupied by a motorcycle customisation business.

=== Early growth (1990s–2008) ===
Through the 1990s, the brand expanded across Queensland. By the year 2000, the business had outgrown its original premises; the Clarksons sold their family home to purchase a building in Fortitude Valley for AU$465,000, which appreciated to approximately AU$4 million within two years and provided collateral for further growth.

=== Expansion with CHAMP Ventures (2010–2014) ===
In April 2010, private equity firm CHAMP Ventures acquired a 40% stake in the business, enabling national and international expansion. At the time of the investment, the company had grown from 32 to 72 stores in three years. The brand's first United States store opened in Malibu, California in March 2012. By 2013 Lorna Jane held a 9.4% share of the Australian athletic clothing market.

=== Historic initiatives ===
Following the 2010–11 Queensland floods, Lorna Jane launched a 'Swap Shop' initiative under which customers could exchange used activewear of any brand for store credit, with the collected clothing donated to the Salvation Army. Originally intended as a one-week program, it was extended permanently. By 2017, more than 45,000 garments had been donated through the scheme.

=== Sale explorations (2014–2019) ===
In early 2014, the Clarksons and CHAMP Ventures considered an initial public offering at a reported target valuation of AU$500 million. After deciding against a float, the company ran a sales process that attracted interest from more than 40 prospective buyers, including Under Armour, Foot Locker and European private equity firm Permira. The Clarksons ultimately withdrew from the process, and CHAMP retained its stake. A second sales process was explored in approximately 2019 but was also pulled before completion.

=== Family ownership restored (2020) ===
In March 2020, shortly before the COVID-19 pandemic disrupted non-essential retail in Australia, the Clarksons bought back CHAMP Ventures' 40% stake for AU$28 million, valuing the business at AU$70 million.

=== Recent operations (2021–present) ===
Following the buyback, the company decided to begin focusing on Australia, New Zealand, and South East Asia, and wound down US operations during and after the COVID-19 pandemic. As of 2025 the brand operates 116 stores across Australia and New Zealand, including 11 stores in New Zealand. The Australian network includes a wholesale presence in 160 Rebel Sport stores and through online retailer, The Iconic.

In September 2025, Lorna Jane Clarkson personally acquired the SOMA wellness retreat in the Byron Bay hinterland, New South Wales, marking an expansion of the wider Lorna Jane brand into experiential wellness. The property had previously been used as a filming location for the television series Nine Perfect Strangers.

=== Leadership ===
Lorna Jane is led by Chief Executive Officer Anna Fowler, who was appointed to the role in early 2023. Fowler joined the company in 2007 and had previously served as Chief Operating Officer, a role in which she oversaw the brand's expansion from 26 to over 150 stores, and its entry into international markets. She holds a Bachelor of Business (Human Resource Management) from Queensland University of Technology. Lorna Jane Clarkson has continued as Chief Creative Officer, and her husband and co-founder Bill Clarkson remain involved in the business. The Clarkson family retains full ownership of the company.

== Sustainability and ethical sourcing ==
=== We Are Citizens ===
From 2024, Lorna Jane consolidated its environmental, social and governance work under a framework called "We Are Citizens." The framework is organised around four United Nations Sustainable Development Goals and prioritises ethical labour practices, responsible material sourcing, and circularity, according to CEO Anna Fowler in an interview with Inside Retail in February 2025.

=== Seamless foundation member ===
In June 2023, Lorna Jane was named one of the six foundation members of Seamless, led by the Australian Fashion Council with support from the NSW Environment Protection Authority. The other foundation members were BIG W, David Jones, R. M. Williams, Rip Curl, and The Iconic. Each foundation member contributed AU$100,000 to the 12-month transition phase. In an International Women’s Day 2024 interview with Ragtrader, Clarkson said the decision to sign off the investment reflected her view that circularity was "a dream that I feel we need to get together as a country and work on."

=== Pre-loved resale marketplace ===
In April 2025, Lorna Jane launched a company-operated pre-loved resale marketplace, reported by Ragtrader, 7News, and Fashion Journal as one of the first brand-owned resale platforms in the Australian activewear category.

Lorna Jane's website reiterates the brand's commitment to sustainable practices including production and sourcing. They claim to have one principal source of production that they have been working with for more than 28 years.

=== Living wage (2025) ===
In 2025, Oxfam Australia reported that Lorna Jane had become the first brand in its "What She Makes" company tracker campaign to complete a wage gap analysis, implement back-pay, and achieve payment of a living wage to all workers at its sole manufacturing partner. According to Oxfam’s economic justice lead, Nayeem Emran, the milestone was "a significant" one, and Oxfam was encouraging other brands to follow. Lorna Jane’s manufacturing partner, Active Apparel Group, produces approximately 97% of the brand’s apparel at an exclusively owned factory in China.

The company prides itself for providing superior conditions for its factory workers, and claims that as few as three workers fail to return from Chinese New Year each year, when the norm for factories in the region is "hundreds". Workers refer to the factories as "Lorna Land". Lorna Jane production is WRAP Gold Certified, but because they did not respond to their survey, the 2016 Ethical Fashion Guide produced by Baptist World Aid Australia rated Lorna Jane as "D" grade for being non-responsive. Executive marketing and e-commerce manager Jessie Dean told the ABC that "it is important to us that our manufacturing source reflects who we are as a brand and our active living philosophy. We continually work to ensure that our workplace code of conduct protects the welfare of every employee and their environment." Clarkson says she would prefer to be still manufacturing in Australia, but the closure of Australian fabric mills and a lack of government support for the clothing industry made that impossible to sustain.

== Community partnerships ==
=== Parkrun Australia and New Zealand (2024–2026) ===
In July 2024, Lorna Jane announced a two-year partnership with Parkrun Australia and Parkrun New Zealand. The Parkrun AU blog reported the partnership covered more than 500 weekly 5-kilometer events across both countries and aimed to encourage women’s participation in regular exercise. At the time of the announcement, parkrun stated that approximately 600,000 women and girls had participated in parkrun events in Australia and New Zealand.

=== Encoreship (2024) ===
In 2024, Lorna Jane partnered with Encoreship, an Australian program supporting women returning to the workforce after extended breaks, as an employer participant. Ragtrader reported the partnership as part of the company’s broader focus on women-in-work programs.

=== Women’s Community Shelters ===
Women’s Community Shelters, an Australian charity that partners with local communities to open and operate shelters for women and children experiencing homelessness or domestic violence, is the company’s primary charity partner. Lorna Jane Clarkson’s Never Give Up podcast donates AU$5,000 per episode to a charity chosen by the guest or, by default, to Women’s Community Shelters.

== Controversies ==
=== Controversy over job advertisement ===
In July 2015, the company experienced backlash over an advertisement for a job vacancy on Seek for a "receptionist/fit model" that specified body dimensions to meet the model requirements to fit a sample size. Critics accused the company of including this element to provide a basis on which to hire a receptionist of a particular body type. Lorna Jane defended the ad and insisted that the fit model requirements were a genuine vacancy within the business that was being combined with the receptionist position out of a desire for efficiency, since both positions were only required on a part-time basis. The ad was taken down after two days, which Lorna Jane claimed was due to the company having received a sufficient number of applicants for the position. Clarkson later said that, in hindsight, she wished the ad had been worded differently, and speculated that the word "fit" had been misconstrued by critics to mean "physically fit" rather than a model to test-fit clothes.

=== Allegations by ex-manager ===
In September 2015, Amy Robinson, a former manager of the Lorna Jane outlet store at the DFO Brisbane centre, commenced legal action against the company, complaining that she was bullied over her weight regularly when she worked there for six months in 2012. She sought over $500,000 in damages The company denied the allegations.

The case went to trial in the Brisbane District Court on 14 February 2017. Rebecca Treston QC, representing Lorna Jane pointed out that in a twelve-page letter to management in 2012, outlining various grievances, Robinson had not once mentioned being bullied over her weight.

The trial resumed to hear the remainder of the medical evidence and adjourned pending Judge Gregory Koppenol's decision. The decision was handed down on November 2017 in Lorna Jane's favour. The decision stated that Amy Robinson had failed to prove any of her claims and the company had acted fairly and reasonably in its responses. Judge Gregory Koppenol also stated that he found her to be an "unreliable witness with serious credibility issues".

=== Impersonator asks women for revealing photos ===
On 16 October 2015, a 32-year-old Gold Coast psychologist (kept anonymous in press reports) said that she had received unsolicited contact from a man who claimed to be representing Lorna Jane, offering her work as a model. The man, who identified himself as "Victor," first made contact via telephone, and subsequently arranged a Skype interview with her. Victor asked that she send him photos of herself in Lorna Jane sports bras and shorts, which she did, later recalling, "I was so excited about the possibility of being in a Lorna Jane catalogue as I adore the brand and what it stands for so sent the photos through." Victor claimed that Lorna Jane was interested in her story because of how she maintained an active lifestyle while living with rheumatoid arthritis.

In a later phone call, Victor told her that she would have to lose another 5-6 kilograms, would have to hide the bandages and gloves she wears to support her arthritic wrists, and would require botox injections to hide her wrinkles before she could model for Lorna Jane. After direct contact between the woman and Lorna Jane, the company revealed that other women had been approached by the same man, including two yoga instructors in Hobart, and that they were working with Queensland Police's Cyber Crime Unit. Lorna Jane expressed disappointment that initial media accounts had not reported on the fraudulent nature of "Victor's" requests. The victim said she was "embarrassed" to have been scammed, and felt sorry for Lorna Jane that the media had reported a Lorna Jane representative would have said "such awful things."

=== Criticism by Universal Society of Hinduism ===
In December 2015, the president of the Universal Society of Hinduism, Rajan Zed, issued a press release criticising Lorna Jane and Sydney Airport for charging fees for yoga classes that passengers could take at the Lorna Jane Active Living room there. In the statement, Zed said that charging fee for yoga at a public facility like Sydney Airport did not seem right to him. Sydney Airport responded that the space was operated by Lorna Jane as a retail business and is not a public space but that it was free for passengers to use outside of class times.Lorna Jane stated that the company was supportive of anything that encouraged passengers to look after their health and have the space available for passengers to use.

=== Patent infringement ===
In March 2019, Carolyn Taylor, a Bendigo based physiotherapist claimed the activewear company's leggings infringed her patent that was filed in 2010 and licensed to manufacturers. Bill Clarkson argued that Lorna Jane had been designing "compressive and supportive activewear" since 1989 when it was founded. Such activewear was part of Lorna Jane's business for over 2 decades before Taylor's patent was accepted.

In January 2020, these proceedings were dismissed by order of the Federal Court, with the consent of both parties. The applicants’ claim against Lorna Jane for patent infringement were dismissed, and Lorna Jane's cross-claim that the Applicants’ patent was invalid was also dismissed. No costs were ordered as part of the dismissal.

=== Lorna Jane South Africa ===
In July 2019, Thomas Stringfellow, the managing director of Lorna Jane South Africa was arrested on fraud charges related to loan agreements to fund Lorna Jane. Investors had allegedly lost in excess of AUD10m.

=== Misleading marketing used to exploit COVID-19 fears ===
In July 2020, Lorna Jane was fined AUD $40,000 by the Therapeutic Goods Administration (TGA), over a range of activewear that the company promoted as protecting wearers against COVID-19. The clothing was made using "LJ Shield exclusive technology," which the brand promoted the range with slogans such as "Cure for the Spread of COVID-19? Lorna Jane Thinks So." and claimed "With Lorna Jane Shield on our garments it meant that we were completely eliminating the possibility of spreading any deadly viruses"

This marketing move was criticised by health organisations, including the Royal Australian College of General Practitioners. RACGP president, Dr Harry Nespolon, criticised Lorna Jane for allegedly exploiting fears regarding the COVID-19 pandemic, stating that "active wear is great for the gym but it can’t protect you against viruses or bacteria".

In December 2020, the Australian Competition & Consumer Commission (ACCC) instituted proceedings against the company in the Australian federal court over the false and misleading claims. ACCC commissioner Sarah Court stated that the claims made by Lorna Jane "gave the impression that the COVID-19 claims were based on scientific or technological evidence when this was not the case. We are particularly concerned about this because consumers often trust well-known brands and assume that their marketing claims are backed up by solid evidence." The ACCC alleged that Lorna Jane had done no testing to back up the claims and that company founder Lorna Jane Clarkson was knowingly involved in the alleged conduct via claims she made in a media release and Instagram video promoting the range.

In July 2021, the company was fined $5 million, with the court holding that Lorna Jane sought to exploit that fear and concern of the public through the use of misleading, deceptive and untrue representations about the properties of LJ Shield activewear.

== See also ==
- List of companies named after people
