= Edward Lloyd Jones =

Australian businessman

- Born: 23 April 1874; Sydney
- Died: 2 February 1934 (aged 59); Sydney
- Education: Newington College; All Saints College, Bathurst; Sydney Grammar School
- Occupations: Shorthorn cattle breeder chairman of David Jones
- Spouse(s): 1897, Jane Mander, née Jones (Dec 1909); 1911, Sarah Ruby, née Jones
- Children: 3 sons and 3 daughters
- Parent(s): Edward Lloyd Jones and Helen Ann, née Jones

Edward Lloyd Jones (23 April 1874 – 2 February 1934) was an Australian Shorthorn cattle breeder and chairman of David Jones. David Jones was founded in Sydney in 1838 and is the world's oldest continuously operating department store still trading under its original name.

== Early life ==
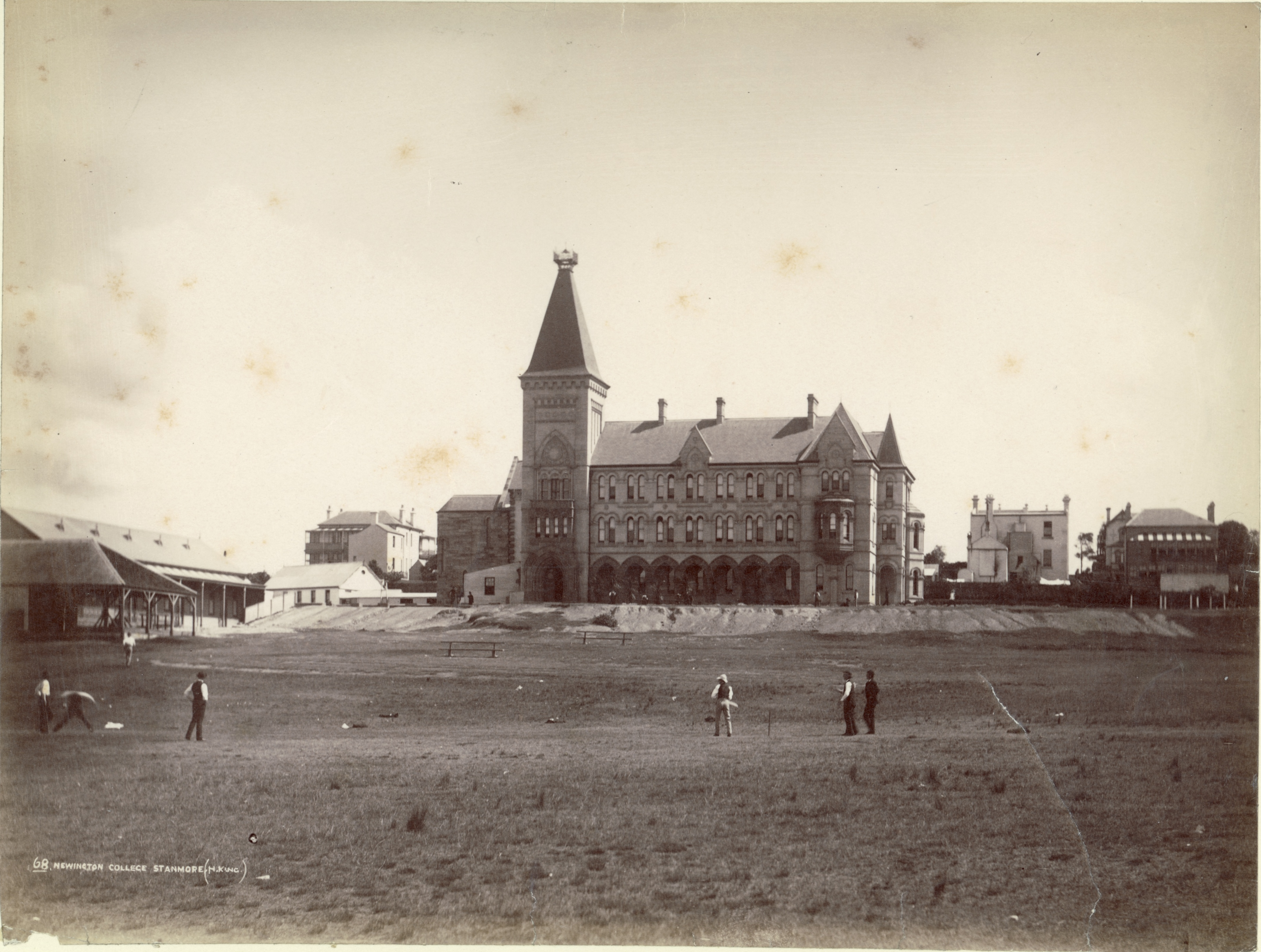
Newington College, c.1880

Edward Lloyd Jones was born in Sydney, the fourth of six children of Edward Lloyd Jones and grandson of David Jones founder of the department store bearing his name. He was the older brother of Eric Lloyd Jones and Charles Lloyd Jones. He was educated at Newington College from 1885 until 1887, then at All Saints College, Bathurst, and from October 1889 at Sydney Grammar School, although no leaving date is recorded in Grammar's register.

== David Jones ==
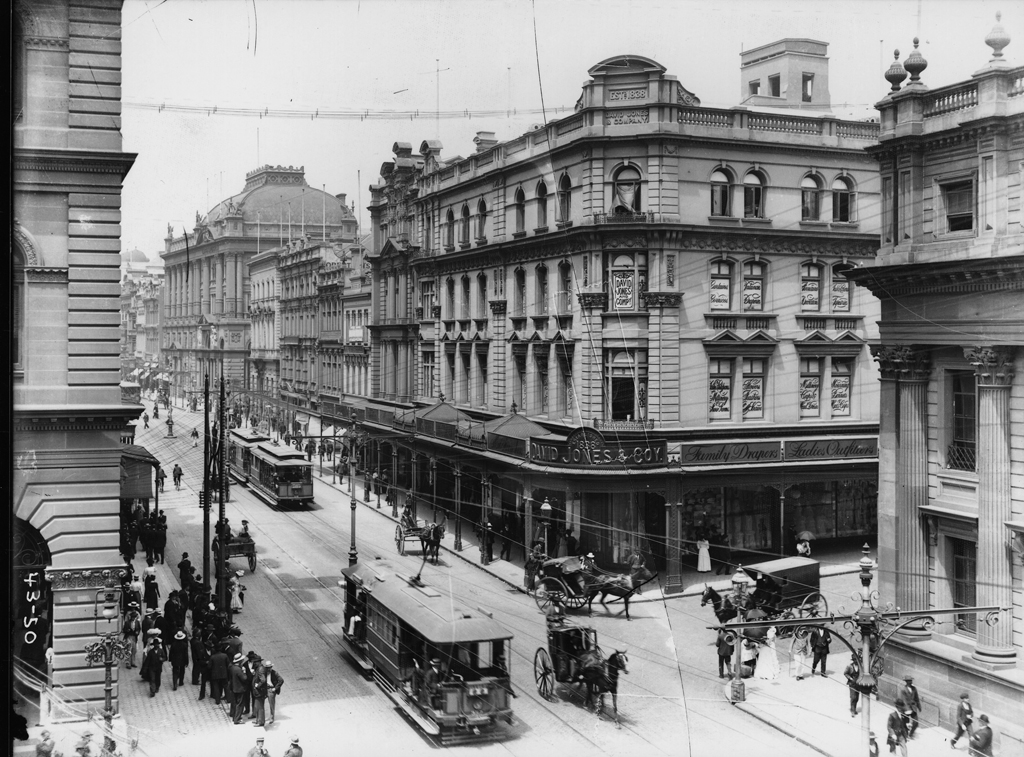
David Jones and Coy c.1900

At eighteen years of age, Jones journeyed to England and entered the London office of David Jones. On his return to Australia he gained pastoral and cattle experience in the Burnett district of Queensland. He re-entered the family business upon the death of his father in a train accident at Redfern, New South Wales in 1894. David Jones was then a private company but in 1906 it became a limited liability company. Jones then became chairman of directors, a position he held until he resigned in 1920. From 1906 until 1910 Jones and his family lived at Halsbury, 12–14 Albyn Road, Strathfield, a large two-storey Federation style house designed by architects Slatyer and Cosh in 1898.

== Cattle breeder ==
From 1921, Jones devoted his attention to the breeding of beef Shorthorn cattle at Hambledon Hill, Singleton, New South Wales where in 1915, he had established a cattle stud. His Shorthorns won many prizes at the Sydney Royal Easter Show and Royal Melbourne Show, and at important country shows. He was president of the Beef Shorthorn Society of New South Wales for some time, and at his death was a vice-president. Jones was also president of the Northern Agricultural Association. Subsequently, he acquired a property at Tarcutta where he lived at the time of his death.

== Family and death ==
Jones married his cousin, Jane Mander Jones, the daughter of Philip Sydney Jones, in 1897. They had two sons and two daughters. In 1911, after the death of his first wife, he married her younger sister, Miss Sarah Ruby Jones, who survived him on his death. There was a son and a daughter by his second marriage. His three sons (Edward, Charles, and David Owen Lloyd Jones ), and three daughters, all survived him. Jones had come to Sydney from his cattle station at Tarcutta to see his mother before her death at Strathfield, on the Saturday before he died. He was cremated at Rookwood Cemetery, following a service at Trinity Uniting Church, Strathfield, which was built by his family and designed by his cousin, George Sydney Jones.

Business positions
Preceded by Edward Lloyd Jones	Chairman of David Jones; 1894 – 1920	Succeeded by Charles Lloyd Jones
