= The Iconic =

Australian online fashion retailer

- Type: Subsidiary
- Industry: E-commerce, Fashion
- Founded: 2011
- Founder: Adam Jacobs; Finn Age Haensel; Andreas Otto
- Headquarters: Sydney, Australia
- Key people: Jere Calmes (CEO); Rostin Javadi (COO)
- Products: Clothes, shoes and accessories
- Parent: Global Fashion Group
- Website: theiconic.com.au

The Iconic (styled as THE ICONIC) is an Australian online fashion and sports retailer based in Sydney. The company was launched in 2011 and is one of Australia's largest fashion, sports, beauty, kidswear and homewares destinations. with over 1500 brands and 165,000 items, including Australian labels P.E Nation, Sass & Bide, Camilla and Marc, Country Road, Witchery and Lorna Jane. International brands stocked include Nike, Levi’s, Calvin Klein, Adidas, MAC, Estee Lauder and more. The Iconic's Yennora based fulfilment centre spans a 28,000 sqm footprint with 46,000sqm of space, including one of the largest mezzanines and pick towers in the Southern Hemisphere.

== History ==
The Iconic was launched in 2011 by three founders and is part of the Global Fashion Group. By 2016. the company had over 400 employees. In 2016, The Iconic moved its headquarters from a Surry Hills warehouse space to an office in the Sydney central business district.

In January 2018, it was announced that CEO Patrick Schmidt would take on a new role as co-CEO of GFG with former Kinnevik Investment Director, Christoph Barchewitz. The Iconic began trialling 1-hour delivery in Sydney in May 2018. The company launched The Iconic Kids in August 2018.

Former Rebel Managing Director, Erica Berchtold, took over as CEO of The Iconic in February 2019. Under Berchtold, The Iconic expanded beyond apparel. In September 2021, The Iconic began a partnership with AirRobe, assisting customers in reselling, renting or recycling of their purchases.

Jere Calmes succeeded Berchtold as CEO in July 2023. In January 2024, email/password combinations stolen from another site were used to access The Iconic's website and accounts were taken over. The Iconic responded to this incident by refunding all ineligible purchases.

In October 2025, The Iconic launched its Front Row loyalty program.

== Achievements and milestones ==
- Wins “Best New Online Retailer” category at the 2012 Online Retailer Industry Awards (ORIAs).
- Wins “Best Social Commerce” category at the 2013 ORIAs.
- Wins “Best Social Commerce” category at the 2013 ORIAs.
- Wins “Best Mobile Commerce Site/App” at the 2014 ORIAs.
- In November 2014, The Iconic becomes the first Australian fashion retailer to deliver parcels on Saturdays with partner, Australia Post.
- In 2016, The Iconic hosted the world's first runway Swim Show on Sydney's iconic Bondi Beach.
- Wins the "Best Fashion Retailer" and "Best Online Only Retailer" at the Power Retail All Star Bash 2020 Awards.
