= David Jones (department store) =

Australian department store

- David Jones store in the Canberra Centre
- Type: Private
- Industry: Retail
- Founded: 1838; 188 years ago, Sydney, Australia
- Founder: David Jones
- Headquarters: Two Melbourne Quarter, 697 Collins Street, Docklands, Victoria, Australia
- Number of locations: 38 (2026)
- Area served: Australia, New Zealand
- Key people: Erica Berchtold (CEO); Megan Gale (Ambassador)
- Products: Cosmetics, Fashion, Homewares, Furniture, Electrical, Food
- Revenue: ▲A$2.2 billion (2016)
- Operating income: ▲A$170 million (2016)
- Number of employees: 7,200 (2014)
- Parent: Anchorage Capital Partners
- Website: www.davidjones.com

David Jones Pty Ltd, trading as David Jones (colloquially referred to as DJs), is an Australian premium and luxury department store. It was founded in 1838 by David Jones, a Welsh merchant and future politician, after he emigrated to Australia. It is the oldest continuously operating department store in the world still trading under its original name.

In 1980, the Adelaide Steamship Company acquired a substantial interest in David Jones, culminating in a complete takeover. The recession of the early 1990s caused the department store assets to be floated as "David Jones Limited". For the next three decades, the company went through turbulent times, eventually leading to discussions of a merger with Myer, and then, in 2014, a takeover by South African retail group Woolworths. In 2016, Woolworths sold the iconic 1938 Market Street store and announced the relocation of David Jones' head office to Richmond, Victoria. In December 2022, David Jones was sold to private equity firm Anchorage Capital Partners for approximately $100m.

It was a member of the International Association of Department Stores from 1979 to 2004.

David Jones Limited currently has 39 stores located throughout most of the Australian states and territories (except Tasmania and the Northern Territory). David Jones' main competitor is the larger department store chain Myer. On 28 July 2016, David Jones opened its first New Zealand store in Wellington after buying Kirkcaldie & Stains, and on 21 November 2019, opened its first Auckland store in the newly developed Westfield Newmarket.

In November 2026, following restructure attempts by Anchorage, the company entered into voluntary administration, with backer Hilco Capital placing it in receivership. It was later announced at least 19 stores will close before the end of the year, including the remaining New Zealand store.

== History ==
David Jones Store, corner George and Barrack Streets, Sydney, c. 1900

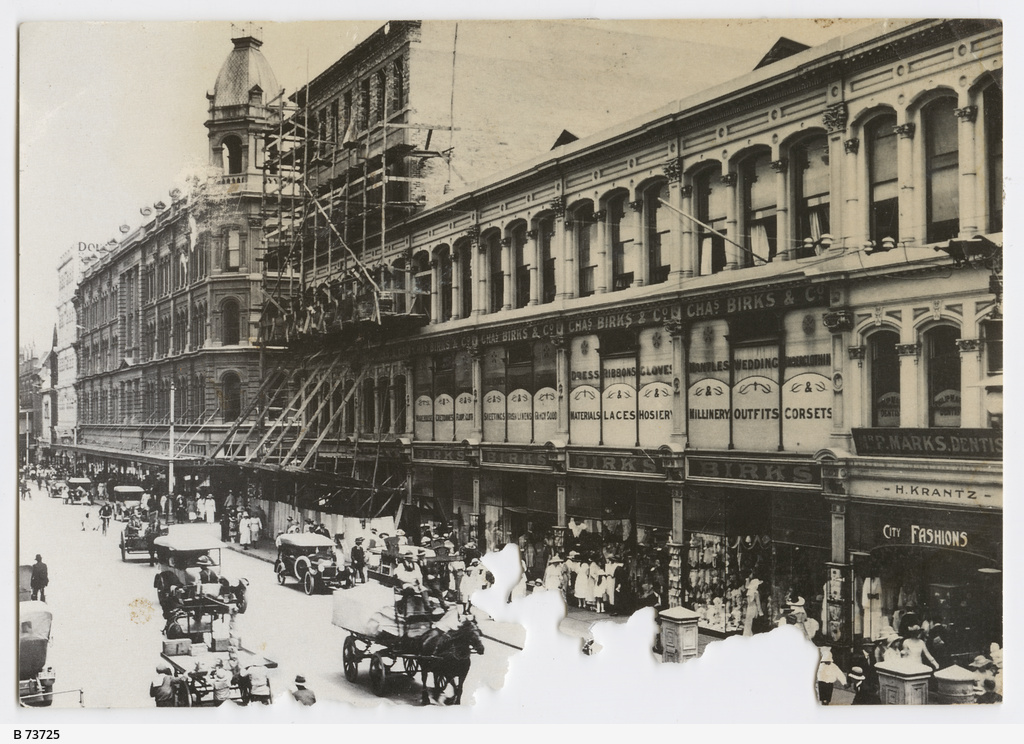
David Jones store in Rundle Street, Adelaide c. 1919.

David Jones, a Welsh merchant, met a Hobart businessman, Charles Appleton, in London. Appleton had established a store in Sydney in 1825 and Jones subsequently established a partnership with him, moved to Australia in 1835, and the Sydney store became known as Appleton and Jones. When the partnership was dissolved in 1838, Jones moved his business to premises on the corner of George Street and Barrack Lane. Jones survived the depression of the 1840s, and by 1856 had retired from active management of the business. A few years later when the firm failed, he returned to manage its affairs and within a few years had fully discharged all obligations to his creditors.

By 1887, the George Street store had been rebuilt and a mail-order facility was introduced. A factory was opened in Marlborough Street, Sydney, to reduce reliance on imported goods. On the death of the founder, his son, Edward Lloyd Jones (1844–1894), led the company. At 18, Edward Lloyd Jones, Jr. (1874–1934) journeyed to England and entered the London office of David Jones. On his return to Australia, he gained pastoral and cattle experience in the Burnett district of Queensland. He re-entered the family business upon the death of his father in the train disaster at Redfern in 1894. David Jones was then a private company, but in 1906, it became a public company. Edward Lloyd Jones, Jr. became chairman of directors and held that position until he resigned in 1921. The Elizabeth Street store was opened in 1927 under the guidance of chairman Charles Lloyd Jones. A further store was opened in Market Street, Sydney, in 1938. A small branch was located in the Australia Hotel on Martin Place. In 1954, a state banquet was held for visiting Queen Elizabeth II in the restaurant of the Elizabeth Street store.

=== 1940–1980 ===
==== Regional NSW and interstate entry ====
Within New South Wales, David Jones established its first store in Newcastle by acquiring Scott's on Hunter Street in 1957 (closed 2011), and in Wollongong, the retailer Walter Lance and Co. in 1960. David Jones acquired and then converted the Big W Department Stores at Kotara Fair and the two-storey Big W at Warrawong in 1971. The Warrawong store closed in February 1986. A store in Wagga Wagga was added due to the purchase of David Copland and Co in 1953 (closed 1971).

David Jones' expanded into Victoria in the 1960s and in 1982 acquired the three stores of Buckley & Nunn located in Bourke Street, Northland, and Chadstone (closed the latter in 1983). In 1987, David Jones purchased the former GJ Coles store and building at 299 Bourke Street, Melbourne, converting it into a David Jones store. David Jones also owned the former Georges store in Collins Street, Melbourne between 1981 and 1995. In South Australia there were the acquisitions of Charles Birks & Co (Adelaide) in 1954 and John Martin's (Adelaide) in 1985. In Western Australia, it acquired Bon Marche (Perth) in 1954 (closed 1979), Foy & Gibson in 1964 (closed 1978), and Aherns (Perth) in 1999. In Queensland, David Jones purchased Finney Isles (Brisbane) in 1955, McKimmons (Townsville) in 1960 (relocated from Flinders Street and then closed in 1994), T.C. Beirne (Brisbane) in 1961, Marsh and Webster (Mackay) in 1963 (closed 1981), Boland's (Cairns) also in 1963 (relocated to Earlville in 1984, since closed), Wyper Bros. (Bundaberg) in 1972 (closed 1981), and Stuparts (Maryborough) in 1977 (closed 1981).

==== United States ====
In 1974, David Jones acquired a group of 12 stores in the United States, called Buffum's. These were ultimately rolled into Adelaide Steamship Company and closed by that company in May 1991.

==== David Jones Art Gallery ====
Sydney Ure Smith Memorial Exhibition, David Jones Gallery, Elizabeth Street, Sydney, May 1950

A significant feature of the Elizabeth Street shop, contributing greatly to its aura of quality and exclusivity, was the David Jones Art Gallery founded in 1944. Directors included Will Ashton (1944–47), Marion Hall Best (1947–49), John Amory (1949–50), M P Ferrandiere (1950–53), George Duncan (1953–63), Robert Haines (1963–76), Brian Moore (1976–84), and Peta Phillips (1984–92). Among the many drawcards were the Dobell exhibition of 1944, the Duke of Bedford's collection in 1962, and the Mendel Collection of Modern Painting, also in 1962. Prominent arts societies that held annual exhibitions there included the Australian Art Society, the Society of Artists, Australian Watercolour Institute, Contemporary Art Society, and Society of Sculptors and Associates. Prize exhibitions held in the Gallery included those sponsored by WD & HO Wills and Transfield. The gallery also imported Thai and Cambodian works in the 1960s and 70s.

==== Dajonian Repertory Society ====
Throughout the 1930s and '40s, the Sydney store supported the Dajonian Repertory Society, a Staff Club amateur theatre group. Its members were known as "the Dajonians". Their plays were variously performed in the David Jones theatrette, and such theatres as St James' Hall and the Independent Theatre.

They engaged the services of a permanent producer (Carl Francis throughout the '30s and Frederick Hughes from 1940) and produced six plays a year, mostly light comedies by recognised playwrights such as J. B. Priestley. Through this time the company was led by Sir Charles Lloyd Jones until his death in 1958. By 1959, the store network had expanded to eight stores, with expansion focused upon the burgeoning new suburbs of Sydney.

=== 1980–2000 ===
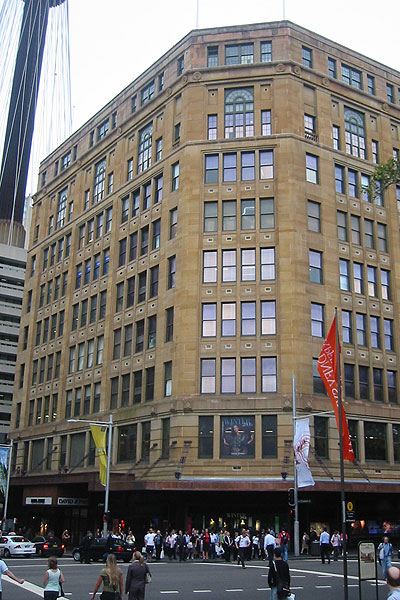
David Jones' flagship building on the corner of Elizabeth Street and Market Street, Sydney

In 1980, the Adelaide Steamship Company, headed by John Spalvins, acquired a substantial interest in David Jones, culminating in a complete takeover that took the company out of the Jones' family hands for the first time in its history. Through the 1980s and into the 1990s, the two companies involved themselves in a complex company structure whereby they each owned about half of each other, and financed by huge borrowings, acquired a portfolio of other companies. Other acquisitions made by Adelaide Steamship included Petersville Sleigh, Tooth & Co, Penfolds, and numerous others.

The recession of the early 1990s caused the nervous lenders (over 200 banks) to demand the return of their assets. This forced the liquidation of the portfolio at "fire-sale" prices and led the two companies into bankruptcy; the worthless Adelaide Steamship Company was renamed "Residual Assco Ltd" and was delisted. The worthless David Jones Limited was renamed "DJL". A number of the assets with value were very successfully sold off via public floats, in particular, National Foods, Woolworths, and the department store assets of DJL were floated as "David Jones Limited". In 1995, David Jones announced an $800 million public float of the David Jones and John Martin retail operations. The "new" David Jones Limited was subsequently listed on the Australian Securities Exchange with a new ASX code of DJS. The separation and public float of the department store assets in 1995 resulted in structural and cultural changes, which had periods of stagnancy and high staff turnover. Changes in management had DJs falter in the late 1990s. Shares initially offered at A$2 fell as low as A$0.90.

=== 2000–2020 ===
In 2000, David Jones returned to Western Australia after a near 25-year absence in the state. All five stores of the former department store Aherns were converted into David Jones stores in Karrinyup, Booragoon, Claremont, Rockingham and the Perth CBD. The Perth CBD Store was the only store of the five that was renovated. Over time, David Jones opened two more stores in Western Australia in Mandurah and Cannington, as well as two more stores in Hillarys and Innaloo on hold as of 2021 which would make them the largest department store chain in Western Australia.

In 2003, after a 20 million dollar loss, a strategic review in the company led to the closure of David Jones Rockingham, and the exit of the lease of David Jones Fountain Gate, as well as the closure of the loss-making David Jones Online web-based business and its gourmet food retail stores, Foodchain. It revitalised many of its stores, including its flagship Elizabeth Street and Market Street stores in Sydney (two individual buildings, linked both underground and via air bridge through Westfield Sydney). During this period, sales growth and profit growth were not increasing despite a consumer spending boom and the securing of exclusive deals with Australian and international brands. In this period, the share price was volatile; it reached a high over $4.50. The global downturn in 2009 affected David Jones, reporting a sales decline of 6.4% to $1,061.2m in the first half of 2009.

In June 2010, CEO Mark McInnes resigned after allegations that he had sexually harassed a female employee. McInnes' successor, Paul Zahra, led the company through significant restructuring, including the expansion of the online retail presence until October 2013, when he announced his intention to resign. Zahra retained his position, however, on account of strong shareholder support against Board Chairman Peter Mason, who eventually resigned along with two other directors who had been accused of insider trading.

In October 2013, Myer approached David Jones with a conditional, nonbinding, indicative proposal for a potential merger of the two companies. Myer believed the combined group would have generated pro forma sales and earnings before interest and taxes in 2013 around $5.0 billion and $364 million, respectively. In addition, Myer expected that a merger could have achieved more than $85 million of ongoing annual cost synergies within three years, primarily driven by structural efficiencies. The board of David Jones rejected the offer in November 2013. In February 2014, Myer again approached David Jones offering to buy the company at market value, with David Jones having a market capitalisation of $1.7 billion. Myer also indicated that its reappointed chief executive Bernie Brookes would be capable of managing the combined entity should the merger occur. David Jones acknowledged the letter stating it would consider any proposal that is in the best interest of its shareholders but made no further comment.

In April 2014, Myer withdrew its proposed merger of equals following on from David Jones' announcement that it had recommended a $4.00 cash per share proposal and entered into a scheme implementation deed with South African retail group Woolworths, implying a market capitalisation of $2.15 billion. The takeover bid was approved in July 2014 by the Federal Court of Australia. In mid-August 2014, despite the previously stated intention by Woolworths to retain CEO Paul Zahra, Zahra announced his resignation once more amid indications of significant differences between strategy and the future of the company, giving three months' notice to ensure a smooth handover. Woolworths then announced that Country Road CEO Iain Nairn would succeed Zahra as chief executive.

In July 2015, the Wellington, New Zealand, department store Kirkcaldie & Stains agreed to be purchased by Woolworths South Africa. The existing Wellington store closed in 2016. It reopened on 28 July 2016 as the first David Jones' store in New Zealand. The David Jones website does not provide delivery to New Zealand, remaining a solely Australian trading website.

Woolworths South Africa sold the 1938 Market Street store in 2016, with the plan that DJ's would lease and occupy the site until late 2019. The store was closed in 2019 with the nine floors of homewares, furniture, electricals, and menswear being merged into the 1927 flagship Elizabeth Street store, which was renovated and had those floors devoted to shopping space expanded from eight to 12.

=== 2020–present ===
In March 2023, David Jones was purchased from Woolworths Holdings by Australian private equity firm Anchorage Capital Partners for a fraction of the value of the 2014 transaction. The new private equity owner has previously invested in Australian retail brands such as Dick Smith and Golden Circle.

In August 2023, David Jones launched a retail media department called ‘Amplify’. It aims to provide a revenue source by advertising brands such as Jaguar Land Rover, Destination Canada, and Regent Cruises to its customer base.

In 2023, the company embarked on a transformative store optimisation and refurbishment initiative, committing significant investment to reimagine its store portfolio. This journey began with a $15 million overhaul of the flagship Bourke Street Mall store, alongside complete refurbishments of key locations, including Burwood, Bondi Junction, Chatswood Chase, and Southland all due to be completed by late 2025.

The company permanently closed its Eastland store in January 2024 as a part of a company restructure that would see flagship stores prioritised.

By April 2026, David Jones was facing declining sales and financial losses, with analysts fearing it might collapse financially in following weeks. In the 2024 financial year the retailer posted a $74 million loss and has yet to lodge its most recent financial statements, reportedly due last October.

The company received criticism for its nonpayment, disenchantment and favouritist treatment of suppliers, with many exclusive partners defecting to Myer and Accent Group receiving a lump sum and cash on delivery after threatening to pull its brands from stores. The suppliers have been put into a payment plan which would not see them get fully paid for 20 weeks. There are doubts for the financial sustainability of the company since the unforeseen May downturn and into the Christmas season. Amid the financial turmoil, a new Chief Financial Officer, Erica Berchtold, was appointed and financier Hilco Capital. An ageing demographic was also blamed for the decline.

Hilco reportedly later appointed McGrathNicol to advise on its options, further sparking fears the company is teetering on receivership and comparisons with moves on other companies such as Dick Smith and Cue. David Jones' lawyers outright deny these reports, labelling them and questioners about their financial position wrong and damaging to the company and its members including their reputation with suppliers.

In October 2026, Country Road Group announced it would significantly reduce its concessions in David Jones stores in 2027 as both companies battle increasing financial pressure.

In late October 2026, it was alleged David Jones has broken banking covenants with Hilco Capital, but Hilco decided to not act on the breach, expressing belief in the company and helping it survive into the Christmas season with emergency stock funding. It was also revealed the company is in talks for "radical" last-ditch plans to turn around the business, including drastically reducing its store numbers and space, rent waivers, shares in the company and further emergency funding from another lender. In November 2026, it was reported the company missed its deadline to file its financial reports with ASIC a second time, and that it may close many locations as part of an agreement to avoid going into administration, including the Southland store and a few other Westfield locations. The company also faced scrutiny from interest groups over selling gift cards in this state, with fears they will become worthless, and an outage blamed on an outage of the GiveX gift card platform.

On 4 November, Westfield said it had not been paid rent since 30 September, is defaulting the company, and had provided a lifeline the company rejected. On Thursday 5 November 2026, the company entered voluntary administration, with McGrathNicol appointed administrators to the company and FTI Consulting appointed receivers by Hilco. Soon after, underpaid concession suppliers preemptively emptied almost entire stores of their products and customers rushed to use up gift cards before they may lose value, as unsecured creditors and Anchorage expect to bear the brunt of the move. Small businesses are especially affected, and say they were not being paid since April but still continued to stock shelves, and the company failed to communicate with them on the lack of payment. On 7 November, receivers finally stopped selling gift cards, but change-of-mind refunds were also discontinued except exchanges were restricted to 14 days of purchase. On 9 November, receivers said they were pleased at record traffic and sales experienced in response to the collapse and uncertainty, saying it is testament to the continuing value of the company, as they smoothly restock stores despite the massive collapse in concessions.

On 11 November, receivers announced that 19 stores will close by the end of the year after the Christmas season, as administrators try to make the business more sustainable. The store closures include 5 in New South Wales, 3 in Victoria, 3 in Western Australia (including the flagship Perth CBD store), 2 in South Australia, 2 in Queensland, Woden in the Australian Capital Territory, and their last remaining New Zealand store in Newmarket.

A creditors' meeting was set for 17 November, with 30 buyers said to be interested, including billionaires with links to rivals and suppliers as well as Anchorage itself via a deed of company arrangement. Scentre Group, Westfield, also contemplates a $1.5 billion bill to repurpose any closed stores. The creditors' meeting revealed that the company owes almost $500 million, including $100 million to suppliers, $200 million to lenders and $10 million to staff. Debts to suppliers go up to the hundreds of thousands of dollars each.

=== Management ===
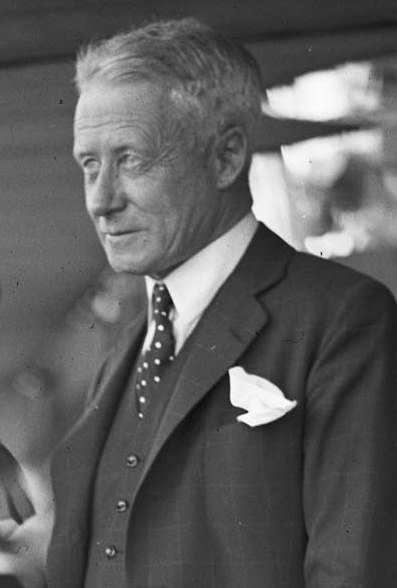
Sir Charles Lloyd Jones, scion of the Jones family and chairman of David Jones Ltd from 1921 until his death in 1958

==== Executive chairmen ====
- David Jones, 1838–1868
- Edward Lloyd Jones, 1868–1894
- Edward Lloyd Jones, Jr., 1894–1921
- Sir Charles Lloyd Jones, 1921–1958
- David Lloyd Jones, 1959–1961
- Charles Lloyd Jones, Jr., 1961–1980

==== Nonexecutive chairmen ====
- Dick Warburton, 1995–2003
- Bob Savage, 2003–2013
- Peter Mason, 2013–2014
- Gordon Cairns, 2014–2016
- Ian Moir, 2016–present

==== Chief executive officers ====
- John Spalvins, 1980–1991
- Rod Mewing, 1991–1994
- Chris Tideman, June 1994 – 10 March 1997
- Peter Wilkinson, 12 March 1997 – 11 September 2002
- Mark McInnes, 3 February 2002 – 18 June 2010
- Paul Zahra, 18 June 2010 – August 2014
- Iain Nairn, 2014–2015
- John Dixon, January 2016 – 23 March 2017
- David Thomas, 20 September 2017 or May 2018 – 6 February 2019
- Ian Moir (interim), 2019 – November 2020
- Scott Fyfe, 26 October 2020 – June 2026
- Erica Berchtold, 22 June 2026 – present

== Branding ==
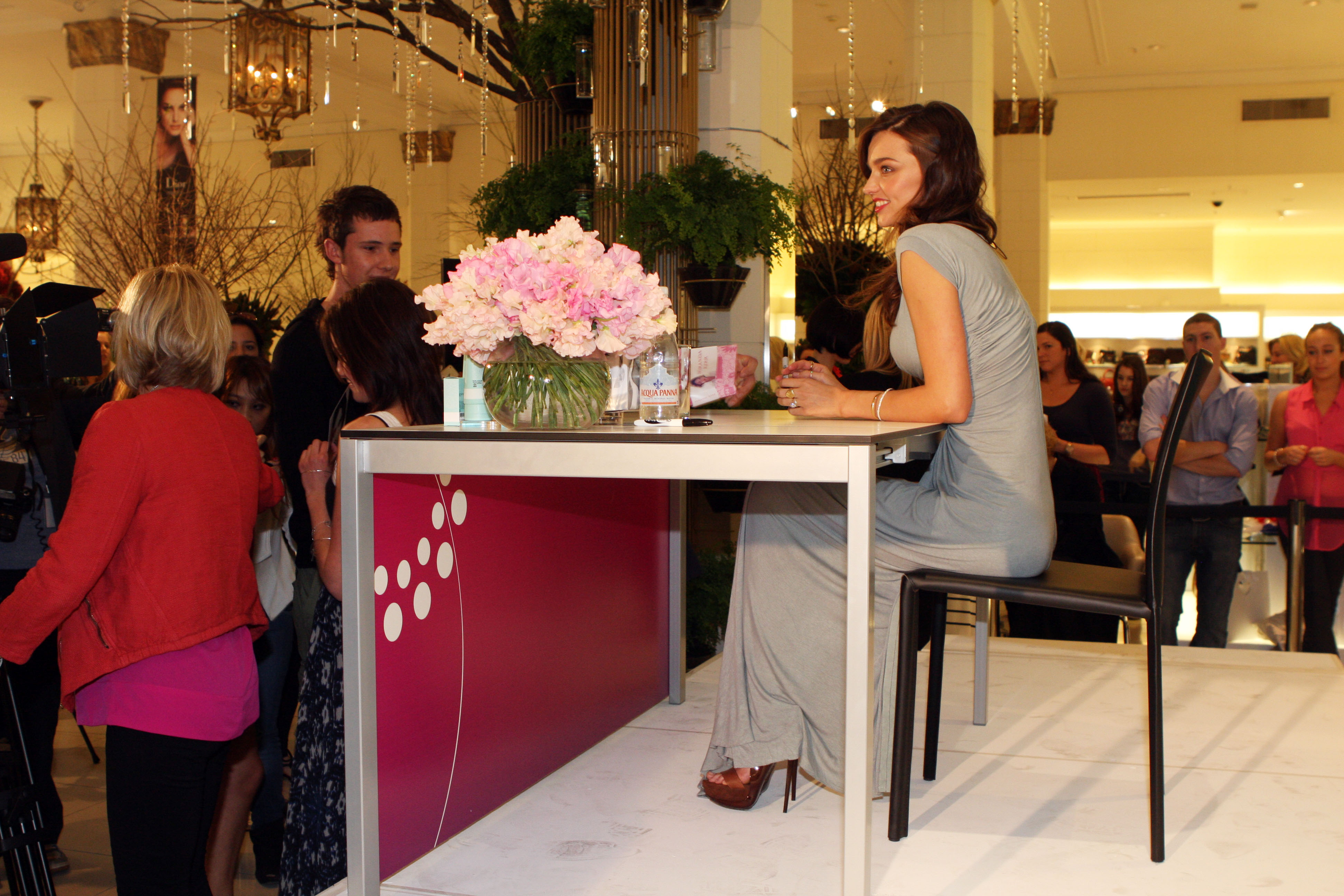
Model Miranda Kerr (seated) at a David Jones book signing in Sydney: Kerr was the spokesperson of the company from 2008 until 2013.

David Jones' branding—a black-on-white houndstooth pattern—is one of the most recognised corporate identities in Australia. A government-sponsored panel judged it in 2006 as one of Australia's top-10 favourite trademarks. The iconic design was the result of a 1967 rebranding exercise by Charles Lloyd Jones, Jr., who desired that the store would be so well known by the design as to not require the use of the name on the packing. It was inspired allegedly from the houndstooth design on a Miss Dior perfume bottle of his mother's, Hannah Jones. On 25 July 2016, David Jones' introduced a new logo, with a revised font style and removed references to the houndstooth online.

Slogans have been used for some time at David Jones'. Often, the slogans have been used for multiple decades and have become the definition of the David Jones' offer for a generation. Past slogans include "For Service" (1960s), "There's no other store like David Jones" (1980s and 1990s), "The most beautiful store in the world" (1980s), "Was. Is. Always" (2010s), "'Live an extraordinary life" (2014–2016), and "One name: endless possibilities" (2016–present).

David Jones has for some decades used models and "personalities" as a way of creating cut through in advertising. In the late 20th century, it was Maureen Duval, who also hosted Good Morning Sydney part sponsored by David Jones on TEN-10 Sydney. In the current century, the new models used include Megan Gale, Miranda Kerr, and Jessica Gomes. Kerr worked for the retailer from 2008 until 2013. On 23 March 2013, model Jessica Gomes was announced as Kerr's replacement. Celebrities used by David Jones in recent times include Liz Hurley and Kim Cattrall.

Five stores have food halls, which are viewed as a key part of the David Jones brand, emphasising quality and style, yet have come under recent criticism. The failed Foodchain experiment—effectively a smaller chain of standalone food halls—was sold to the parent company of Freedom Furniture in 2003 after it proved unprofitable. It was announced in July 2016, Neil Perry, a foodservice and restaurant operator, will consult to David Jones' on the new Food Halls, including assortment, presentation, and service.

== Stores ==
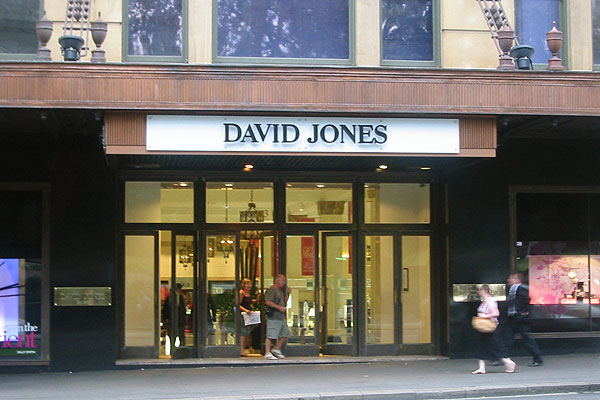
Elizabeth Street entrance in Sydney

David Jones currently has department stores in all Australian capital cities except Hobart and Darwin. It also has stores in Kotara, Tuggerah, Maitland, Wollongong, Maroochydore, Robina and Broadbeach Waters.

As of November 2026, David Jones has 38 stores in Australia and New Zealand:

- ACT: 2 stores
- New South Wales: 13 stores
- New Zealand: 1 store
- South Australia: 3 stores
- Queensland: 7 stores
- Victoria: 7 stores
- Western Australia: 5 stores

Stores are located in city centre retail areas and enclosed shopping centres. In 2007, David Jones recast its criteria for store locations, reflecting CEO Mark McInnes' intention to concentrate on "low-risk, high-value locations". Stores in Sydney at Bankstown Central (closed July 2007) and Westfield Eastgardens (October 2007) were replaced by Myer, but David Jones replaced the Myer store in Westfield Burwood in May 2007 and opened a new store at Westfield Chermside in August 2007 and a new store at QueensPlaza, Brisbane in February 2008. The Melbourne Bourke Street stores were completely renovated in mid-2010 at a cost of $250 million.

In January 2008, David Jones announced that the Claremont store would be closed in 2009 to allow for a complete rebuilding to reopen in 2011. The new store increased floor space by 60%. David Jones' opened a new format, fashion focused format in Malvern, Victoria on 12 September 2013. On 1 May 2014, David Jones opened in Indooroopilly Shopping Centre, Brisbane. In October 2014, David Jones opened in Macquarie Centre, at the same time a number of foreign retailers opened in the centre including H&M, Zara, and Uniqlo.

In March 2016, the new owners of David Jones', Woolworths South Africa, announced the sale of the nine-floor Market Street Sydney store, housing the Home, Food, and Menswear departments, which is to be incorporated into a renovated Elizabeth Street store, which will have its shopping floors increased from eight to 12. The Market Street store was opened in 1938. The store closed on 16 March 2020.

In February 2017, David Jones announced a three-store deal at Westfield Shopping centres in Western Australia. The three stores are in Westfield Carousel, Westfield Innaloo and Westfield Whitford City. The first store opened in Westfield Carousel in August 2018. As of May 2020, the other two stores have either been put on hold, or silently cancelled. On 22 March 2018, two new stores opened, one in Stockland Green Hills in East Maitland, NSW, and another in Mandurah, WA, in the Mandurah Forum Shopping Centre.

In July 2020, David Jones announced the sale of the iconic Melbourne Menswear, Home and Food building at 299 Bourke Street. All departments relocated into the refurbished main building at 310 Bourke Street in July 2022. The Food Hall closed permanently during April 2021 in the COVID-19 pandemic lockdown. A tailored selection of food has been retained and incorporated into the renovated main building on level 5. In late 2022, David Jones announced the closure of its Westfield Mt Gravatt store in 2023 after 52 years of trading.

In 2021, it was announced that David Jones in Wellington, the first in New Zealand, would close on 12 June 2022. This left the David Jones store at Westfield Newmarket in Auckland as the only remaining store in New Zealand.

In early 2026, the Tuggerah and Castle Hill stores closed permanently, with signage pointing customers to nearby stores in Hornsby, Parramatta, and in Chatswood Chase (which had been recently renovated) outside the former Castle Hill store.

In 2026, significant store closures were a major talking point in discussions with landlords like Scentre Group as well as receivers.

In November 2026, receivers announced that 19 stores will close in the near future after the end of the 2026 holiday shopping season, including the remaining New Zealand store and a large majority of stores in Western Australia, South Australia and ACT. The planned store closures are:

- ACT: Woden
- New South Wales: Green Hills, Hornsby, Macquarie Centre, Macquarie Square, Parramatta, Warringah Mall and Wollongong Central
- New Zealand: Newmarket
- South Australia: Marion and West Lakes
- Queensland: Robina Town Centre and Sunshine Plaza
- Victoria: Glen Waverly, Highpoint, and Malvern Central
- Western Australia: Carousel and Hay Street Mall (Perth CBD flagship)

== Gallery ==
David Jones' previous logo, featuring the "There's no other store like" slogan

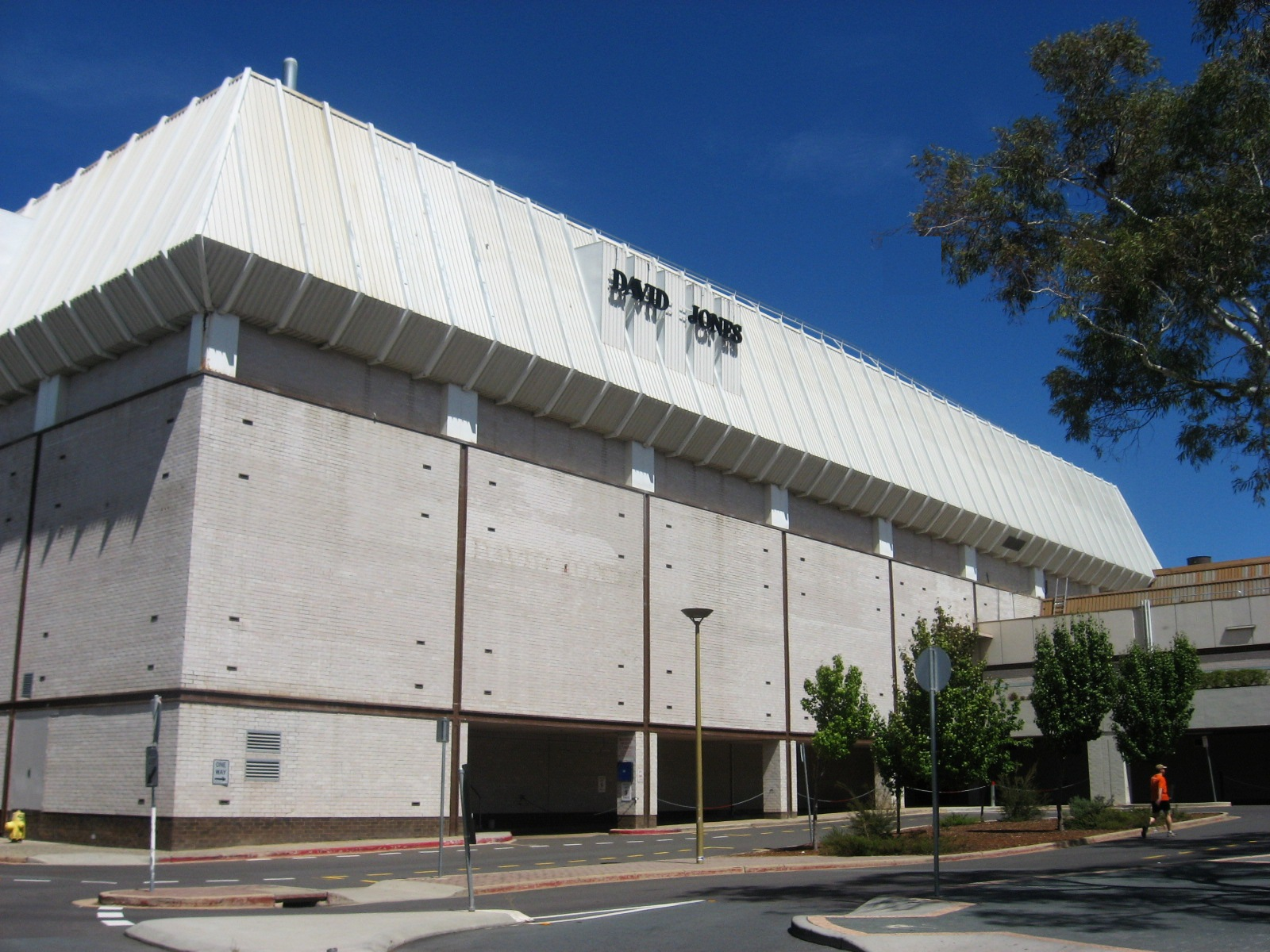
David Jones at Woden Town Centre in Canberra

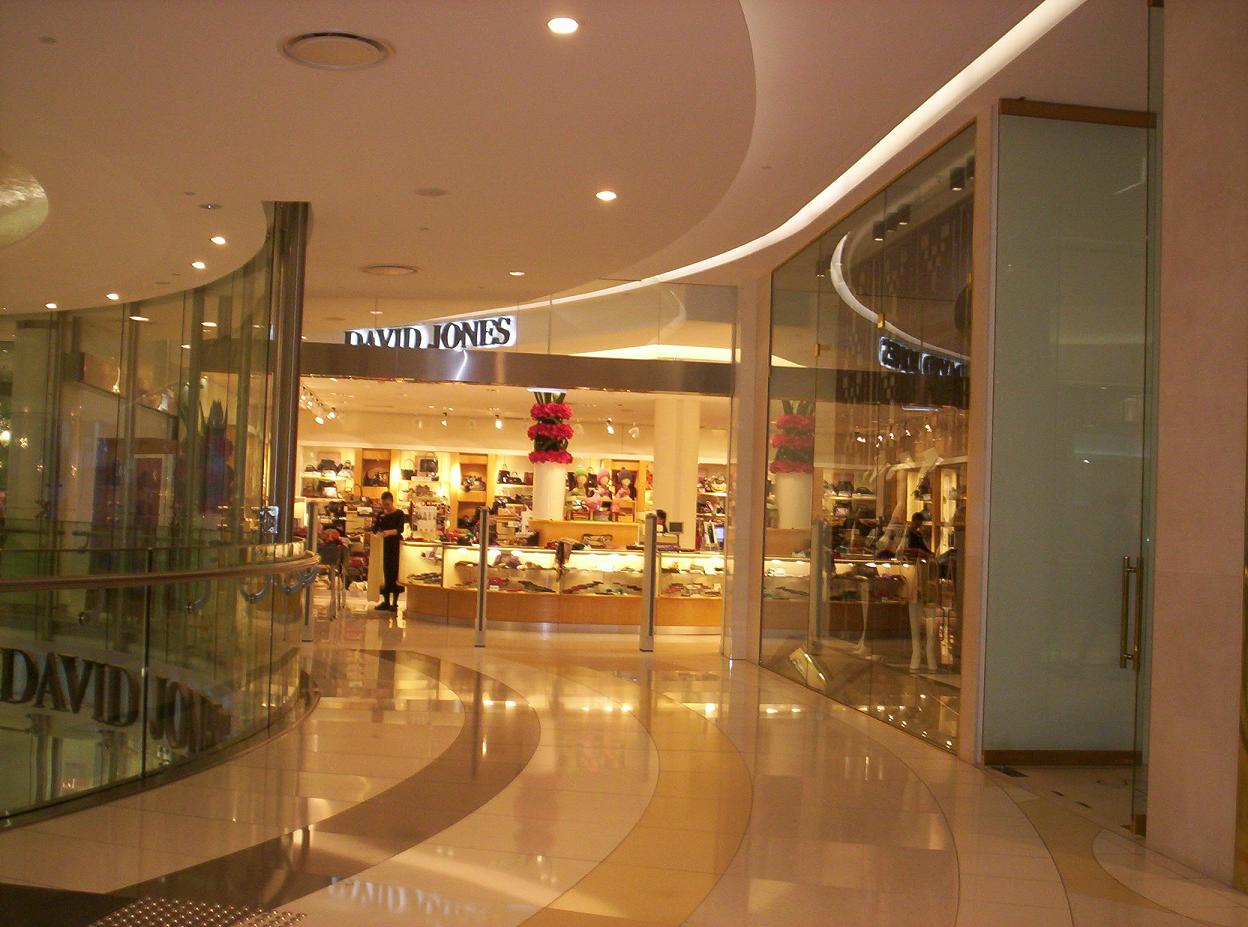
David Jones – second floor at QueensPlaza in Brisbane (Queen Street Mall end)

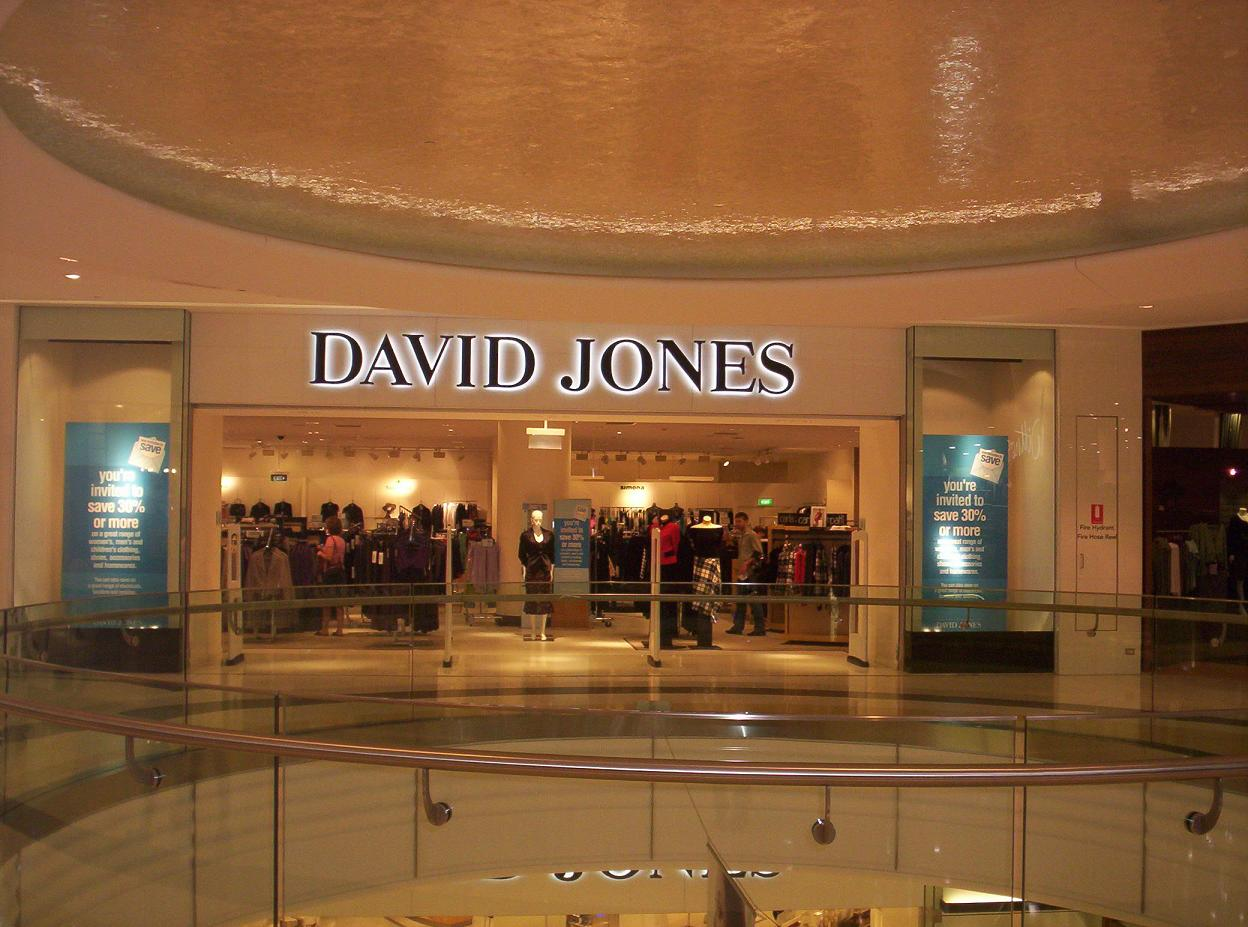
David Jones – second floor at QueensPlaza in Brisbane (Adelaide Street end)

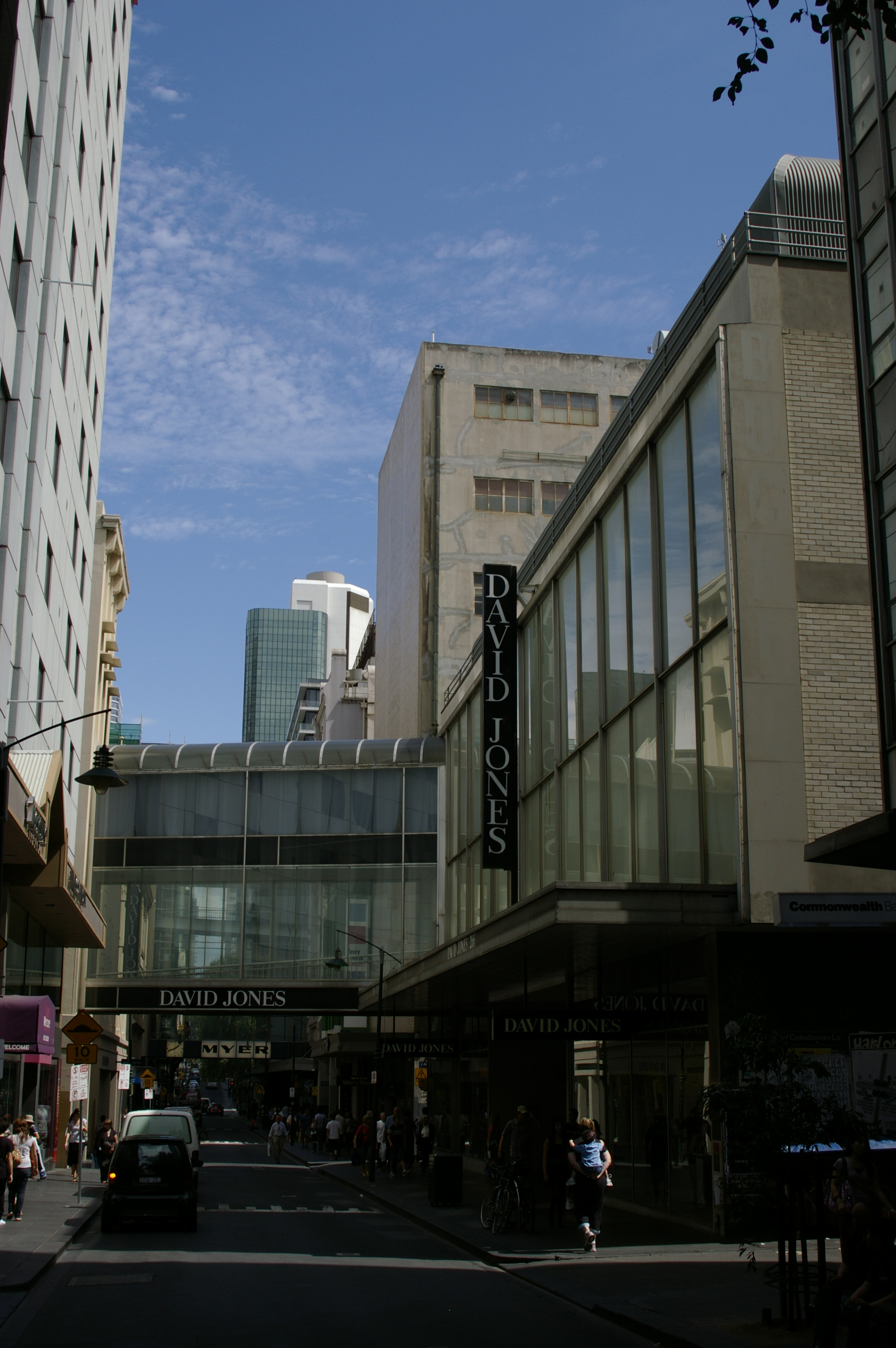
The former David Jones Melbourne, redeveloped in 2010

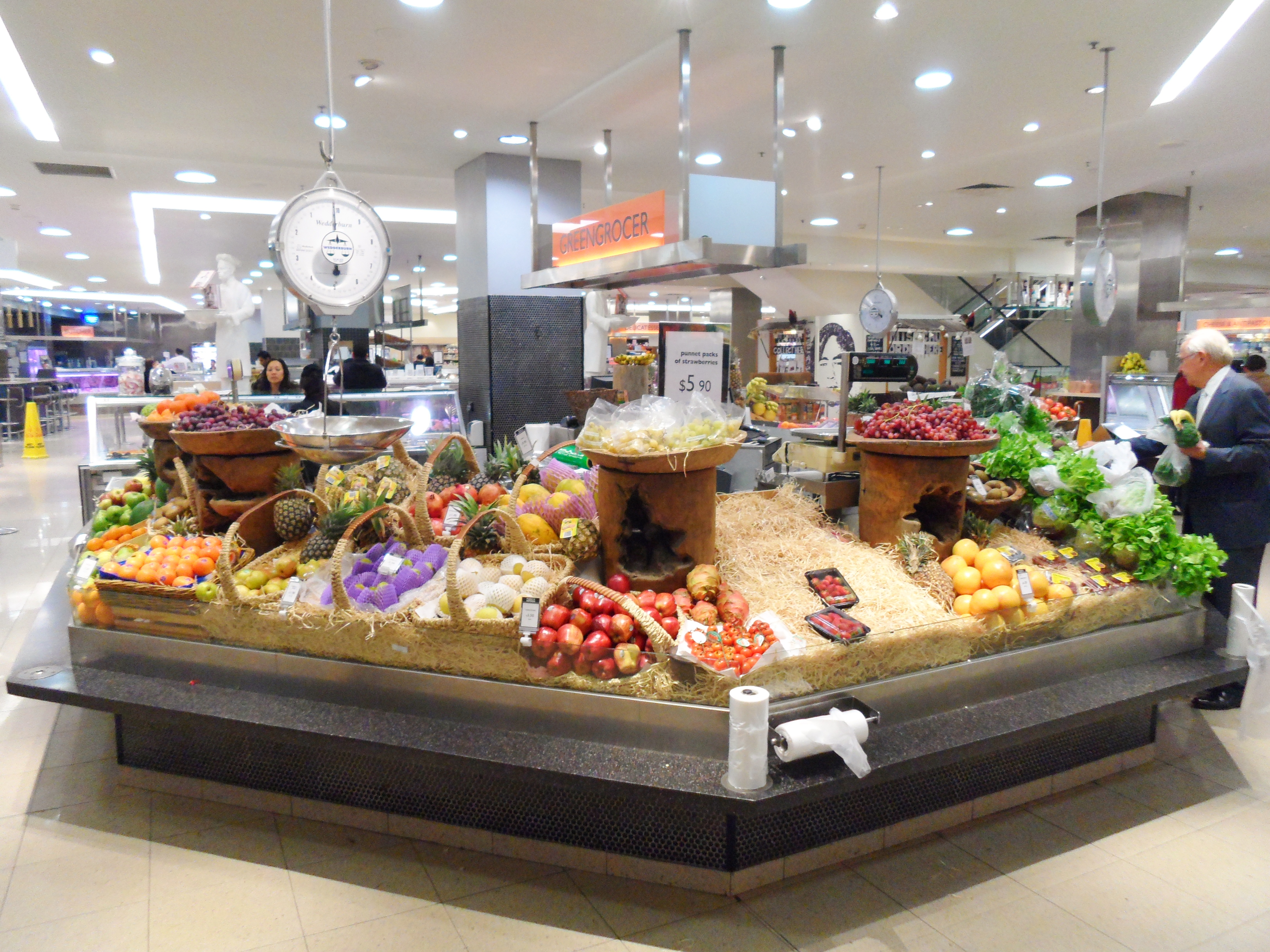
The Foodhall at David Jones Market Street, Sydney store

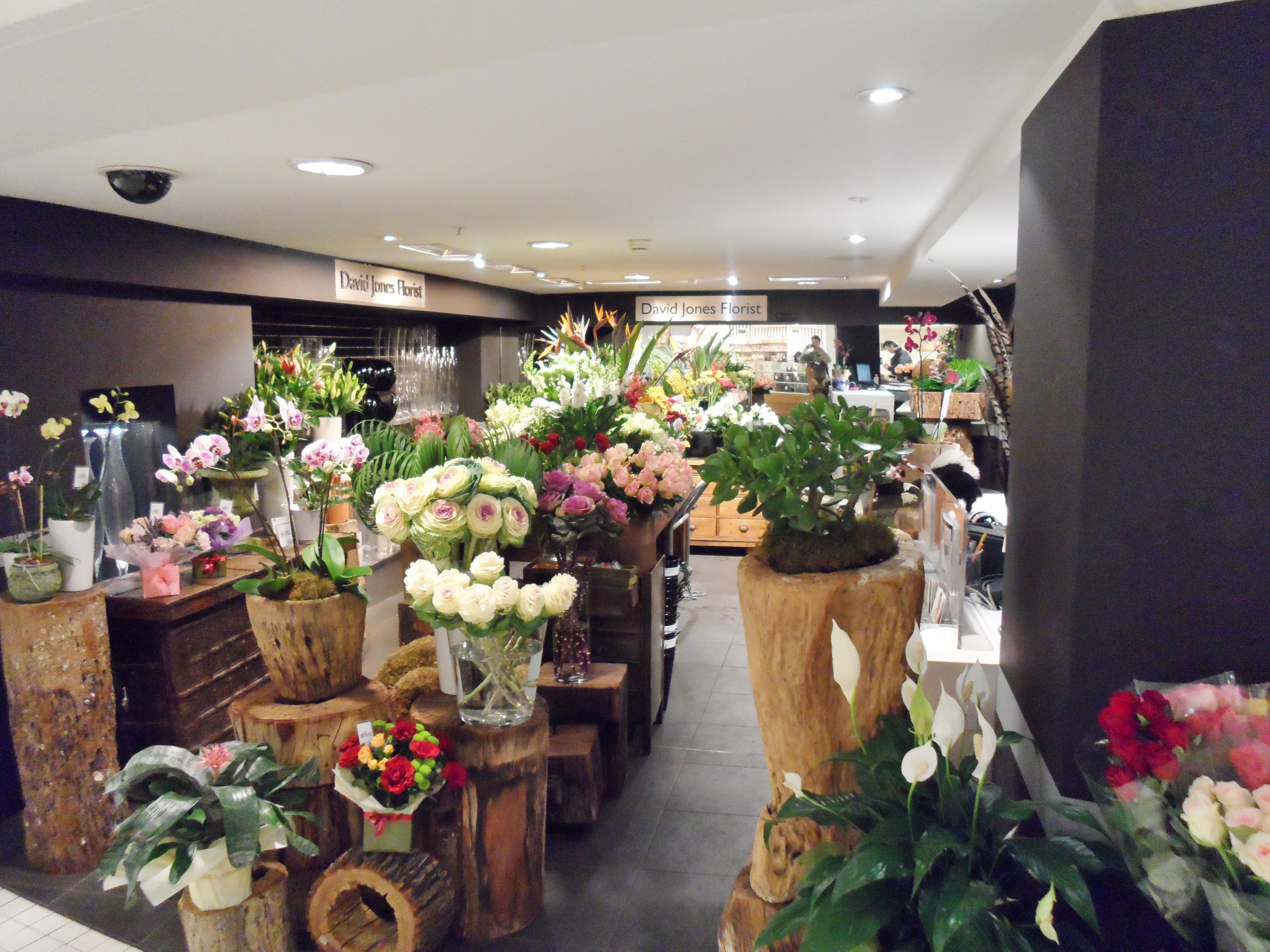
David Jones Florist at David Jones Elizabeth Street, Sydney store

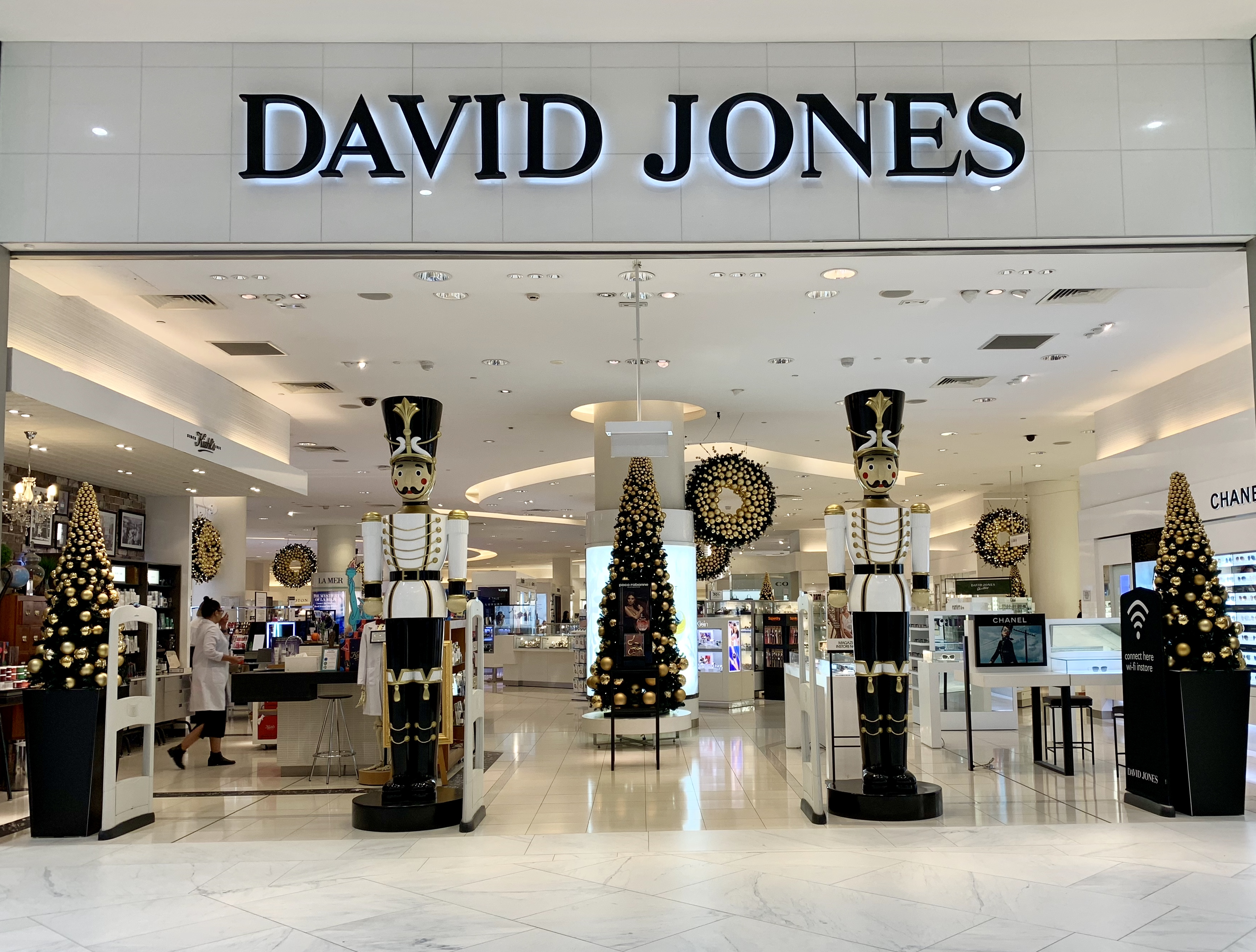
Christmas decorations in David Jones at QueensPlaza in Brisbane

Francis Bradford modelling for David Jones Department Store, c. 1935

Shoe floor displays, David Jones, Elizabeth Street, Sydney, June 1953

David Jones Building under construction, Elizabeth Street, Sydney, 1924-25

David Jones Building under construction, Elizabeth Street, Sydney, 1924-25

David Jones Building under construction, Elizabeth Street, Sydney, 1924-25

== Arms ==
Coat of arms of David Jones
Adopted Granted by the Kings of Arms, 1 January 1968 (Earl Marshal's Warrant, 6 November 1967). Crest On a Wreath Or and Gules, a Dragon's Head erased Sable between two Fleurs-de-lys Or. Helm A closed Helmet, mantling Or doubled Gules. Escutcheon Checky alternate Or and checky Argent and Sable, two Flaunches Azure on each a Fleurs-de-lys Or. Supporters On the dexter side a Dragon Gules winged Argent, and on the sinister side a Kangaroo proper. Compartment A field of Grass Vert. Motto Latin: Sedula Cura ("Attentive care") Badge A Caduceus Or, the Serpents Vert, between and conjoined with two Fleurs-de-lys Or. Symbolism In the escutcheon, the subdivisions represent the departments of a department store. The checky portions represent accounting. The flaunches with the Fleurs-de-lys are drawn from the Jones family arms granted in 1954. The Dragons represent Wales and the Welsh ancestry of the Jones family, but with white wings to differentiate from the Royal Dragon. The Kangaroo is taken from the Coat of arms of New South Wales and represents the home state of the company. The Caduceus in the badge is symbolic of Mercury, the Roman god of commerce.

== See also ==
- Department stores around the world
- List of companies named after people
