= Anchorage Capital Partners =

Australian private equity company

- Type: Private
- Industry: Finance
- Founded: 2007
- Headquarters: Sydney, Australia
- Area served: Australia; New Zealand; Asia Pacific
- Key people: Phil Cave (Founder, Executive Chair); Simon Woodhouse (Managing Partner); Callen O'Brien (Managing Partner); Edward Bostock (Managing Partner)
- AUM: ~$1,200 million (2026 forecast)
- Website: www.anchoragecapital.com.au

Anchorage Capital Partners is a private equity firm which specialises in buyout investments across Australia and New Zealand. These have included well-known domestic brands such as David Jones, Dick Smith and Golden Circle.

== Company name ==
In 2015, the company lost a case in the Federal Court against a similarly named American company, Anchorage Capital Group, which also does business in Australia. The Australians were the first to register their website and claimed that the Americans had infringed on their trademark. The judge accepted the Australians had not copied the name of the pre-existing American company when choosing a name of their own.

== Founders and management ==
Anchorage Capital Partners was founded in 2007 by Phillip Cave, Daniel Wong and Michael Briggs. Cave had worked in private equity during the 1980s on transactions involving Australian brands such as Victa and Sunbeam, and later served as an executive director at Macquarie Bank.

The firm’s leadership team comprises Cave with managing partners Simon Woodhouse, Callen O’Brien and Edward Bostock. O'Brien is also chairman of not-for-profit disability service provider Ability First Australia.

== History ==
In 2007, Anchorage bought the Australian-owned canned fruit company Golden Circle and sold it about six months later to Heinz.

In 2009, it bought the New Zealand master franchiser for Burger King, Antares Restaurant Group, which it sold in 2011 to the Blackstone Group.

Between 2010 and 2014, Anchorage traded several other businesses including First Engineering and Bisalloy Steel Group.

In 2012, the Dick Smith Electronics chain was bought for A$20 million. The chain was floated on the Australian Securities Exchange the following year with a market capitalisation of $520 million. The float was described as the "greatest private equity heist of all time" by Forager Fund Management chief investment officer Steve Johnson. The Shop, Distributive and Allied Employees Association told a Senate inquiry that the chain had been stripped of cash. The company collapsed and the stores closed in 2016 but the brand name was sold to Kogan.com, which continued online sales. The company founder, Dick Smith, blamed Anchorage's greed for the chain going into receivership with the loss of more than 3,000 jobs. However, Anchorage management told the Senate inquiry they had left Dick Smith Electronics in a good financial position.

In 2013, Anchorage reached a first and final close on its second fund at the hard cap of $250 million. The vehicle, which came in oversubscribed, spent less than six months in the market.

In 2014, irrigation company Total Eden was sold to Ruralco for $57 million.

In 2017, Anchorage closed its third fund at over $350 million. The fund was reportedly oversubscribed and reached a final close within three months of launch.

In 2020, Scott's Refrigerated Logistics, which supplies trucks and warehouses to supermarket chains in Australia, was bought for about $75 million from Eagers Automotive. The same year, rail freight company CF Asia Pacific was bought, and rebranded a year later as Rail First Asset Management.

In 2021, Anchorage sold its childcare business Affinity Education to Quadrant Private Equity. Affinity was Australia's second-largest listed childcare business, operating 161 centres with a capacity of 12,682 children. The same year, financial software group GBST Holdings was acquired. Also in 2021, the firm bought clothing and footwear retailer Brand Collective from Pacific Brands and sold it later in the year to the LK Group, the holding company of Melbourne businessman Larry Kestelman.

In 2022, Anchorage completed the sale of Rail First to a consortium of infrastructure investors. The same year, the David Jones department store chain was bought from Woolworths South Africa.

In 2023, Anchorage closed its fourth institutional fund after surpassing its $500 million target. The same year, Anchorage acquired in-home nursing provider Access Community Health from New Zealand-based Green Cross Health. Also in 2023, turnaround plans for Scott's Refrigerated Logistics were hampered due to flooding and the COVID-19 pandemic. The company went into receivership, 1,500 workers were laid off, and plans were made to sell Scott's 500 trucks. Union officials blamed supermarket chain Aldi for refusing to sign a supply chain charter. A spike in fuel prices caused by the Russian invasion of Ukraine also hurt profitability.

In 2026, Anchorage agreed to acquire 100 per cent of HMA International, an Australian industrial products and services group, via a scheme of arrangement. The same year, David Jones went into receivership after failing to renegotiate its rent with landlord Westfield.

== Portfolio ==
As at December 2025, Anchorage was estimated to manage over $1 billion in assets under management. Previous funds were speculated to have generated returns of over 40 per cent.

Notable former investments include Brand Collective, Burger King, Dick Smith, Golden Circle, RailFirst and Total Eden. Other investments have been in a diverse range of industries such as childcare, facilities management, manufacturing, industrials, technology services and telecommunications.

Fund	Year closed	Capital
Anchorage Capital Partners Fund I	2008	$200 million
Anchorage Capital Partners Fund II	2013	$250 million
Anchorage Capital Partners Fund III	2017	$350 million
Anchorage Capital Partners Fund IV	2023	$500 million
