= Profitable growth =

Economic concept

Profitable growth is the combination of profitability and growth, more precisely the combination of Economic Profitability and Growth of Free cash flows. Profitable growth is aimed at seducing the financial community; it emerged in the early 80s when shareholder value creation became firms’ main objective.

Profitable Growth stresses that Profitability and Growth should be jointly achieved. It is a break from previous firms’ development models which advocated growth at first to achieve economies of scale and then profitability (see BCG Growth-share matrix).

A study by Davidsson et al. (2009) found that small and medium-sized firms (SMEs) are much more likely to get a position of high growth AND high profitability starting from high profitability/low growth than from high growth/low profitability. Firms with the latter performance configuration instead more often transitioned to low growth/low profitability.

Brännback et al. (2009) replicated these findings in a sample of biotech firms.

Ben-Hafaïedh & Hamelin (2022) undertook a replication on more than 650,000 firms and confirmed the same main results separately in each of 28 studied countries as well as across industry sectors, firm age and size classes, time spans from 1 to 7 years, alternative growth and profitability measures, and using several alternative analysis techniques.

The conclusion is that firms (at least SMEs) do usually not grow into profitability. Instead, profitable growth usually starts with a sound level of profitability at smaller scale. These are arguably among the most consistently data-supported conclusions in all of business research.

== The Profitable Growth Paradox ==
Profitable Growth hides in fact a contradiction in terms, one often speaks of the Profitable Growth paradox. Most growth investment will at first reduce the profitability, cost reduction efforts to boost the bottom line usually have a negative impact on future growth. This is especially true with mature products or services. The only way out of the Profitable Growth paradox is through innovation. It concerns not only technical innovation but mainly business model innovation, a new product-market space where there is no competition (see Blue Ocean Strategy). An interesting piece of research by the BCG shows that no business model is able to achieve a sustainable competitive advantage for more than 10 years.

== Economic Profitability ==
Economic Profit is the residual wealth calculated by deducting the cost of capital from the firm's operating profit. It is defined as: Net Operating Profit After Taxes (NOPAT) - Cost of Capital Employed

- NOPAT (Net Operating Profit After Tax) NOPAT = EBIT x (1 - Tax Rate)
NOPAT measures a company's potential cash earnings.

- Capital Employed Capital Employed is the amount of funds which has been used over the period by the company to generate the NOPAT.

There are 2 ways to measure Capital Employed (CE) :
- CE = Shareholders’ Equity + Net Financial Debt
Net Financial Debt is computed as: interest bearing Debt – Cash and Cash equivalents.
- CE = Fixed Assets + Net Working Capital
Net Working Capital is usually computed as: Account Receivables + Inventories – Account Payables.

Both definitions lead to the same measure of Capital Employed. One prefers the first one when computing Capital Employed at the firm level; the second one is more practical when focusing on a company's business unit.
