= Thomas Ahern (businessman) =

Thomas Ahern (23 December 1884 – 22 May 1970) was the owner and manager of the Western Australian department store chain Aherns.

== Early life ==
Ahern was born on 23 December 1884 in the village of Ballymacoda, Ireland. His parents were farmers Patrick Ahern and his wife Mary, née McGrath. Following his education at the village school, Ahern had to support himself – the family farm could not adequately provide for him and his five brothers. He also served in several other roles, including as trustee of the Karrakatta Cemetery Board and a justice of the peace. He became an apprentice to a draper in Midleton, and from 1904 found employment in Tipperary, Dublin, Kilkenny and Waterford.

In 1910 he applied for an assistance package to come to Australia, in place of a colleague who would not be going. He made the journey in 1911, getting off at Fremantle following the recommendation of a Catholic priest. Ahern found employment in Boulder, and arranged for his fiancé, Nora McGrath, to travel to Australia. They married in Perth on 19 June 1912, and relocated there.

== Business ==
Ahern's job in Boulder was at Brennans' drapery. In Perth he became a departmental manager for Bon Marché from 1912 to 1918, and subsequently was the manager of Brennans' store in Perth. In 1922 he was offered the opportunity to manage the Quinlan family's store Robertson and Moffat's Successors, which sold drapery and furniture. Ahern demanded a controlling interest in a partnership, which he received. The store opened as Aherns on 15 May 1922, with 50 employees.

The company was profitable from the start, and over time Ahern bought out the remaining shares from his partners. In 1970 Aherns had 500 employees; around that time his sons had proposed expanding with new stores in suburbs, which the elder Ahern eagerly endorsed.

== Other roles and personal life ==
Ahern had five children with his wife Nora, three sons and two daughters. Their third, Tom, was born in 1919, and became a doctor and was an honorary consultant ear, nose and throat surgeon at Royal Perth Hospital.

Ahern took on several roles apart from managing his business. He was a trustee of the Karrakatta Cemetery Board from 1938 to 1942, patron of the Claremont Football Club between 1940 and 1969, president of the Retail Traders' Association of Western Australia from 1945 to 1947, and president of the Perth Chamber of Commerce from 1954 to 1955.

Ahern was also pointed a papal knight of St Sylvester in Rome in 1927, whilst on a trip to Europe; and a justice of the peace in 1940. Other interests included golf, swimming, and racing horses – he owned three horse.

Ahern died on 22 May 1970, and was buried at Karrakatta Cemetery.

== Legacy ==
By 1997 Aherns had grown to employ 1,500 workers, and had stores in Rockingham, Claremont, Booragoon and Karrinyup, in addition to the original Hay Street location. David Jones bought Aherns and its five stores in October 1999 for $29 million.

Ahern was recognised as one of the most influential Western Australian businesspeople in The West Australian's 2013 list of the 100 most influential.
