= Anchorage Capital Group =

American hedge fund

Anchorage Capital Group, L.L.C

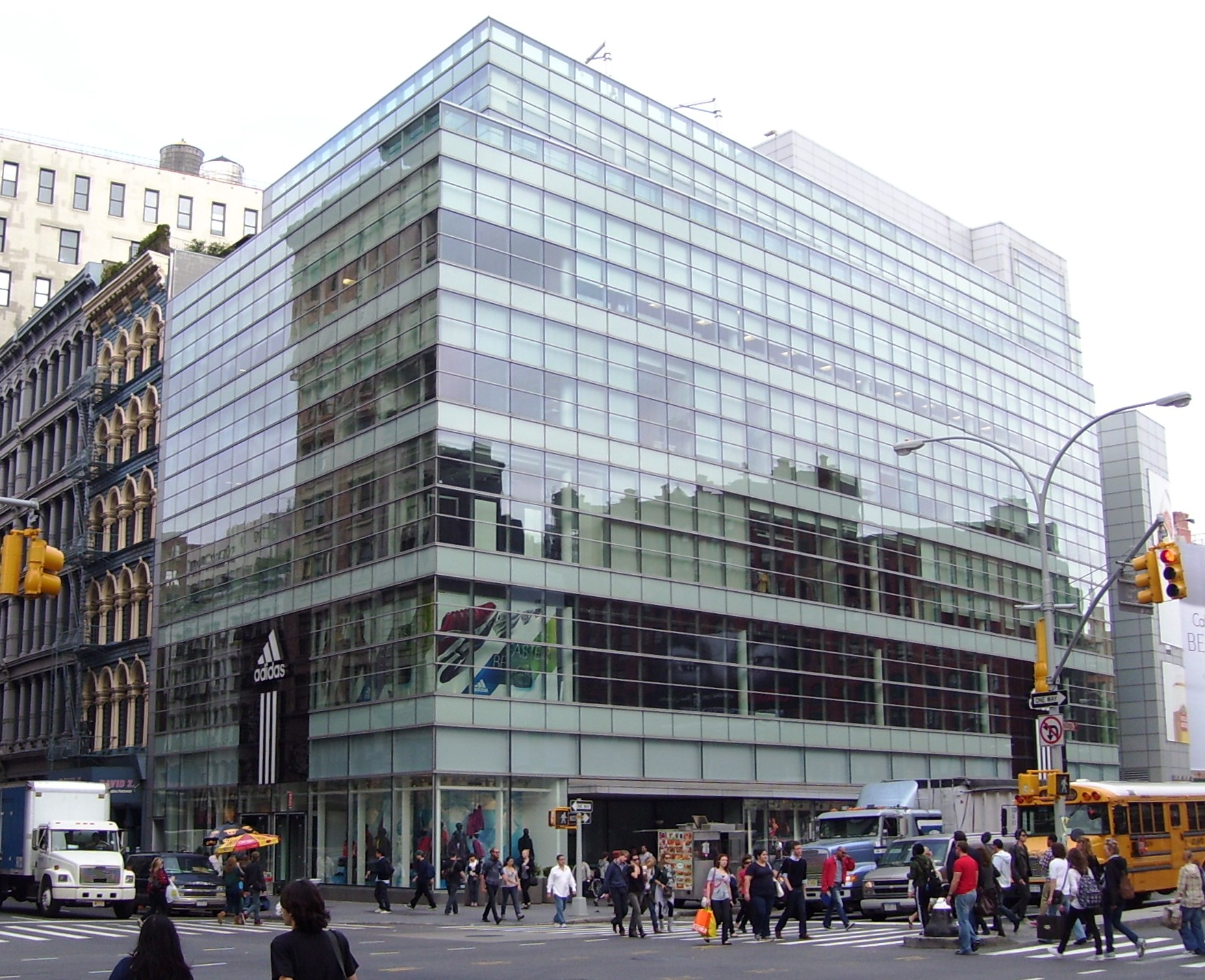
- Headquarters at 610 Broadway
- Company type: Private
- Industry: Investment management
- Founded: 2003; 23 years ago
- Founders: Kevin Ulrich; Tony Davis
- Headquarters: 610 Broadway, New York City, U.S.
- Products: Alternative investments Hedge funds Distressed securities Private credit Venture capital
- AUM: US$32 billion (2022)
- Number of employees: 100 (2022)
- Website: anchoragecap.com

Anchorage Capital Group (or simply Anchorage) is an American investment management firm based in New York City. The firm is known as one of the world's most prominent vulture funds, which are funds that invest in distressed securities.

== Background ==
Anchorage was founded in 2003 by Kevin Ulrich and Tony Davis. Both previously worked in the distressed-debt business of Goldman Sachs. The firm received $100 million in seed money from Reservoir Capital Group. Later on, Davis left the firm to start Inherent Group, which focused on ESG investments.

In December 2021, Anchorage announced it would close its $7.4 billion credit flagship fund (ACP Capital) due to lackluster returns and difficulties in markets such as distressed securities. The firm moved on to focus on investments related to structured finance, such as collateralized loan obligations, as well as private credit. At the same time, co-founder Ulrich announced he was stepping down from his role as CEO to a new role as chairman. One potential factors that led to this, apart from the firm's recent performance, was that in 2019, Ulrich was sued by a woman accusing him of sexual assault in a Manhattan hotel. The complaint was withdrawn later after Ulrich settled with the accuser, but the firm's clients were displeased with the firm's failure to disclose the allegations after they appeared on public record. Anchorage is headquartered in New York City and has an additional office in London.

Although Anchorage mainly invests in distressed securities of companies such as Eir and New Look, in recent years it has been involved in funding startups and early stage companies such as Brat TV, Eko and SingleStore.

== Notable deals ==
=== MGM Studios ===
One of the most notable deals Anchorage was involved in was investing $500 million in MGM Studios in 2010 to bring it out of bankruptcy. Ulrich joined its board in 2010 and became chairman in 2017. During the period Anchorage held MGM Studios, it had to fight off efforts by activist shareholder Carl Icahn to take control the Studios. Gary Barber was brought in by Ulrich to become CEO in 2010 but a rift developed between the two. In October 2017, Barber received a contract renewal for five years until 2022. Several months later, he was fired and given a $260 million severance package. Barber was never replaced and in the interim, the company was led by the newly formed "Office of the CEO". In 2021, MGM studios was sold to Amazon for $8.45 billion which resulted in a $2 billion profit for Anchorage.

=== J.Crew ===
On May 4, 2020, J.Crew announced that it would apply for bankruptcy protection amidst the COVID-19 pandemic. On September 11, 2020, it was announced that J.Crew had exited bankruptcy after an investment from Anchorage.

== Disputes ==
In 2013, BNP Paribas sued Anchorage Capital after it agreed to purchase $60 million worth of debt from Irish Bank Resolution Corporation and then failed to pay. The court ruled in favour of BNP Paribas.
