= List of shopping centres in Australia =

This is a list of notable shopping centres in Australia. It does not include street shopping strips such as Chapel Street, Melbourne or Oxford Street, Sydney which were prevalent in Australian cities until the 1960s.

== Australian Capital Territory ==
- Canberra Centre
- Erindale Centre, Wanniassa
- Kippax Fair, Holt
- Majura Park Shopping Centre, Majura Park
- South.Point Tuggeranong, Greenway
- Westfield Belconnen
- Westfield Woden (formerly Woden Plaza and Woden Shopping Square), Phillip

== New South Wales ==
=== Sydney City ===
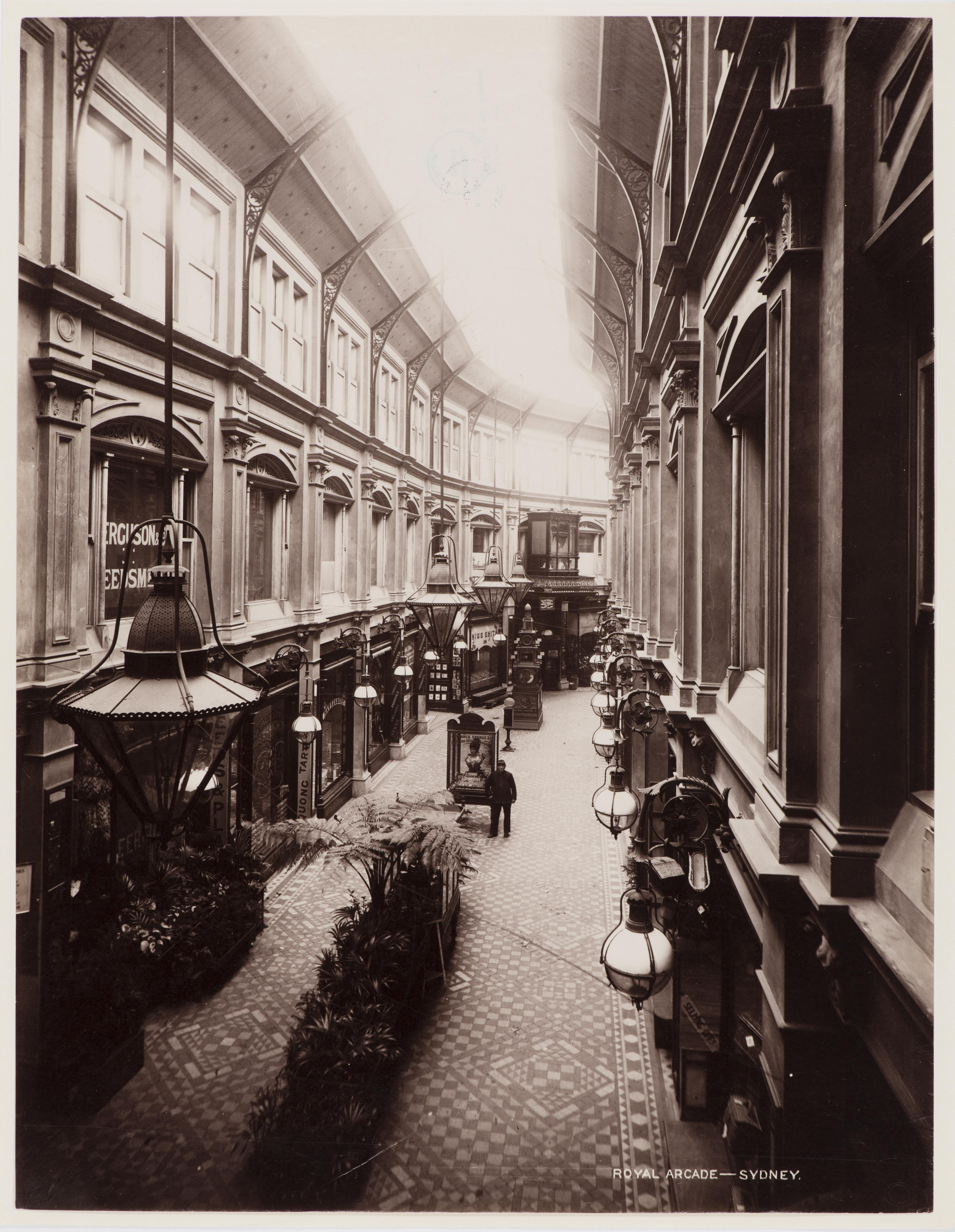
Sydney's Royal Arcade, since demolished. This arcade, one of the earliest examples of a shopping centre in Australia and one of many of its kind in Sydney's city centre, ran from George Street near the markets, through to Pitt Street.

- Broadway Shopping Centre, Sydney CBD
- Central Park Mall, Sydney CBD
- The Galeries, Sydney CBD
- Glasshouse, Sydney CBD
- Market City, Sydney CBD
- MidCity, Sydney CBD
- Queen Victoria Building, Sydney CBD
- The Strand Arcade, Sydney CBD
- Westfield Sydney
- World Square, Sydney CBD
- 25 Martin Place, Sydney CBD

=== Greater Sydney ===
- Ashfield Mall, Ashfield
- Balgowlah Village, Balgowlah
- Bankstown Central, Bankstown
- Bass Hill Plaza, Bass Hill
- Birkenhead Point Outlet Centre, Drummoyne
- Burwood Plaza, Burwood
- Carlingford Court, Carlingford
- Castle Towers, Castle Hill
- Casula Mall, Casula
- Chatswood Chase, Chatswood
- Chatswood Interchange, Chatswood
- DFO Homebush, Homebush
- Eastgate Bondi Junction, Bondi Junction
- HomeCo. Roselands
- Hurstville Central, Hurstville
- Kings Cross Centre, Potts Point
- Lachlan's Square Village, Macquarie Park
- Lidcombe Shopping Centre, Lidcombe
- Macarthur Square, Campbelltown
- Macquarie Centre, Macquarie Park
- Marina Square, Wentworth Point
- Narellan Town Centre, Narellan
- North Rocks Shopping Centre, North Rocks
- Pacific Bondi Beach, Bondi Beach
- Pacific Square, Maroubra
- Royal Randwick Shopping Centre, Randwick
- Rhodes Waterside, Rhodes
- Rockdale Plaza, Rockdale
- Rouse Hill Town Centre, Rouse Hill
- Southpoint Shopping Centre, Hillsdale
- St Ives Shopping Village, St Ives
- Strathfield Plaza, Strathfield
- Stockland Merrylands, Merrylands
- Stockland Wetherill Park, Wetherill Park
- Top Ryde City, Ryde
- Warriewood Square, Warriewood
- Westfield Bondi Junction, Bondi Junction
- Westfield Burwood, Burwood
- Westfield Chatswood, Chatswood
- Westfield Eastgardens, Eastgardens
- Westfield Hornsby, Hornsby
- Westfield Hurstville, Hurstville
- Westfield Liverpool, Liverpool
- Westfield Miranda, Miranda
- Westfield Mount Druitt, Mount Druitt
- Westfield Parramatta, Parramatta
- Westfield Penrith, Penrith
- Westfield Warringah Mall, Brookvale
- Westpoint Blacktown, Blacktown

=== Hunter Region ===
- Charlestown Square, Charlestown
- Stockland Glendale, Glendale
- Stockland Green Hills, East Maitland
- Westfield Kotara, Kotara

=== Illawarra ===
- Dapto Mall, Dapto
- Stockland Shellharbour, Shellharbour City Centre
- Warrawong Plaza, Warrawong
- Wollongong Central, Wollongong

=== Central Coast ===
- Deepwater Plaza, Woy Woy
- Erina Fair, Erina
- Westfield Tuggerah, Tuggerah

=== North Coast ===
The North Coast refers to the Mid North Coast and the Northern Rivers regions.

- Port Central, Port Macquarie
- Toormina Gardens, Coffs Harbour
- Lismore Square, Lismore
- Ballina Fair, Ballina
- Tweed City, Tweed Heads
- Taree Central, Taree

=== Regional ===
- Lavington Square, Lavington
- Wagga Wagga Marketplace, Wagga Wagga

== Northern Territory ==
=== Greater Darwin ===
- Casuarina Square, Casuarina
- Palmerston Shopping Centre, Palmerston
- Smith Street Mall, Darwin CBD

=== Regional ===
- Alice Plaza, Alice Springs
- Katherine Central, Katherine
- Todd Mall, Alice Springs
- Yeperenye Shopping Centre, Alice Springs

== Queensland ==
=== Brisbane CBD ===
- Anzac Square Arcade, Brisbane central business district
- Brisbane Arcade, Brisbane central business district
- Broadway on the Mall, Brisbane central business district
- MacArthur Central, Brisbane central business district
- Post Office Square, Brisbane
- Queen Street Mall, Brisbane central business district
- QueensPlaza, Brisbane central business district
- Uptown, Brisbane central business district
- Wintergarden, Brisbane central business district

=== Greater Brisbane ===
- Brookside Shopping Centre, Mitchelton
- DFO Brisbane Airport, Brisbane Airport
- DFO Jindalee, Jindalee
- Indooroopilly Shopping Centre (formerly Westfield Indooroopilly), Indooroopilly
- Grand Plaza Shopping Centre, Browns Plains
- Logan Hyperdome, Shailer Park
- McWhirters Marketplace, Fortitude Valley
- Mount Ommaney Shopping Centre, Mount Ommaney
- Riverlink Shopping Centre, North Ipswich
- Strathpine Centre (formerly Westfield Strathpine), Strathpine
- Taigum Square, Taigum
- Toombul Shopping Centre (formerly Centro Toombul, formerly Westfield Toombul), Nundah
- Toowong Village, Toowong
- Westfield Carindale, Carindale
- Westfield Chermside, Chermside
- Westfield Mt Gravatt, Upper Mount Gravatt
- Westfield North Lakes, North Lakes

=== Gold Coast ===
- Australia Fair, Southport
- Chevron Renaissance, Surfers Paradise
- Harbour Town, Biggera Waters
- Meriton Retail Precinct Sundale, Southport
- Oasis Shopping Centre, Broadbeach
- Pacific Fair, Broadbeach Waters
- Paradise Centre, Surfers Paradise
- Q Super Centre, Mermaid Waters
- Robina Town Centre, Robina
- The Pines, Elanora
- The Strand at Coolangatta, Coolangatta
- The 4217, Surfers Paradise
- Westfield Coomera, Coomera
- Westfield Helensvale, Helensvale

=== Toowoomba ===
- Grand Central Shopping Centre, Toowoomba
- Clifford Gardens Shopping Centre, Toowoomba
- Wilsonton Shopping Centre, Toowoomba
- Toowoomba Plaza Shopping Centre, Toowoomba

=== Sunshine Coast ===
- Kawana Shoppingworld, Buddina
- Noosa Civic, Noosa
- Sunshine Plaza, Maroochydore
- Nambour Plaza, Nambour

=== Gympie ===
- Gympie Central, (formerly Centro Gympie) Gympie

=== Rockhampton ===
- Parkhurst Town Centre, Parkhurst
- Stockland Rockhampton, Rockhampton

=== Mackay ===
- Caneland Central, Mackay

=== Townsville ===
- Townsville Shopping Centre, Aitkenvale
- Willows Shopping Centre, kirwan
- Castletown shopping Centre

=== Cairns ===
- Cairns Central, Cairns

=== Regional ===
- Stockland, Hervey Bay
- Stockland, Bundaberg
- Stockland, Kensington
- Hinkler Central, Bundaberg

== South Australia ==
=== Adelaide CBD ===
- Adelaide Central Market
- Hutt Street
- Rundle Mall shopping precinct including:
  - Adelaide Arcade
  - Adelaide Central Plaza
  - City Cross Arcade
  - Myer Centre

=== Adelaide suburbs ===
- Armada Arndale, Kilkenny
- Burnside Village, Glenside
- Castle Plaza, Edwardstown
- Colonnades Shopping Centre, Noarlunga Centre
- District Outlet Shopping Centre, Parafield
- Elizabeth Shopping Centre, Elizabeth
- Harbour Town, Adelaide Airport
- Mitcham Square Shopping Centre, Torrens Park
- Port Adelaide Plaza, Port Adelaide
- Westfield Marion, Oaklands Park
- Westfield Tea Tree Plaza, Modbury
- Westfield West Lakes, West Lakes
- Mount Barker Central, Mount Barker

=== Mount Gambier ===
- Mount Gambier Central, Mount Gambier

=== Regional ===
- Gawler Central Shopping Centre, Gawler
- Murray Bridge Marketplace, Murray Bridge
- Phoenix Plaza, Gawler
- Victor Central Shopping Centre, Victor Harbor
- Westland Shopping Centre, Whyalla

== Tasmania ==
=== Hobart CBD ===
- Cat and Fiddle Arcade, Hobart CBD
- Centrepoint Shopping Centre, Hobart CBD
- Icon Complex, Hobart CBD

=== Hobart Suburbs ===
- Channel Court, Kingston
- Claremont Plaza, Claremont
- Cove Hill Shopping Centre, Bridgewater
- Eastlands Shopping Centre, Rosny Park
- Glenorchy Central, Glenorchy
- Glenorchy Plaza, Glenorchy
- Gateway Shopping Centre, Sorell
- Glebe Hill Village, Howrah
- Green Point Plaza, Bridgewater
- Kingston Town Shopping Centre, Kingston
- Kingston Plaza, Kingston
- Moonah Central, Moonah
- Northgate Shopping Centre, Glenorchy
- New Town Plaza Newtown
- Shoreline Shopping Centre, Howrah
- Sorell Plaza, Sorell

=== Launceston ===
- Brisbane Street Mall, Launceston
- Prospect Vale Marketplace, Prospect

=== Regional ===
- Burnie Plaza, Burnie

== Victoria ==
=== Melbourne CBD ===
- Collins Place, Collins Street
- Emporium Melbourne, Bourke Street
- Block Arcade, Collins Street
- The District Docklands, Docklands
- Galleria, Elizabeth Street
- Melbourne Central, Lonsdale Street
- Melbourne GPO, Bourke Street
- QV Village, Lonsdale Street
- Royal Arcade, Bourke Street
- Southbank Promenade, Southbank
- Kmart Centre, Bourke Street
- Collins Arcade, Collins Street

=== Melbourne suburbs ===
- Armada Dandenong Plaza, Dandenong
- Bayside Shopping Centre, Frankston
- Box Hill Central, Box Hill
- Broadmeadows Central, Broadmeadows
- Caulfield Plaza Shopping Centre, Caulfield
- Central Square, Thornhill Park
- Central Walk Shopping Centre, Melton
- Chadstone Shopping Centre, Malvern East
- Chirnside Park Shopping Centre, Chirnside Park
- Cobblebank Village, Cobblebank
- Coburns Central, Melton West
- DFO Essendon, Essendon Fields
- DFO Moorabbin, Cheltenham
- DFO South Wharf, South Wharf
- DFO Unihill, Bundoora
- Eastland Shopping Centre, Ringwood
- Essendon Fields Shopping Centre, Essendon Fields
- Forest Hill Chase Shopping Centre, Forest Hill
- Greensborough Plaza, Greensborough
- Highpoint Shopping Centre, Maribyrnong
- HomeCo. Woodlea Town, Aintree
- Karingal Hub Shopping Centre, Frankston
- Langwarrin Plaza Shopping Centre, Langwarrin
- M-City Shopping Centre, Clayton
- Malvern Central Malvern
- Melton Homemaker Centre, Melton
- Melton Station Square, Melton South
- Northcote Plaza, Northcote
- Northland Shopping Centre, Preston
- Opalia Plaza, Weir Views
- Pacific Epping, Epping
- Pacific Werribee, Werribee
- Pran Central, South Yarra
- Stockland Highlands, Craigieburn
- Stockland Point Cook, Point Cook
- Sunshine Marketplace, Sunshine
- The Glen Shopping Centre, Glen Waverley
- The Jam Factory, South Yarra
- The Links Shopping Centre, Oakleigh South
- The Pines Shopping Centre, Doncaster East
- Tooronga Village, Glen Iris
- Victoria Gardens Shopping Centre, Richmond
- Watergardens Town Centre, Taylors Lakes
- Waverley Gardens Shopping Centre, Mulgrave
- Westfield Airport West, Airport West
- Westfield Doncaster, Doncaster
- Westfield Fountain Gate, Narre Warren
- Westfield Knox, Wantirna South
- Westfield Plenty Valley, South Morang
- Westfield Southland, Cheltenham
- Woodgrove Shopping Centre, Melton West
- Uni Hill Factory Outlets, Bundoora

=== Geelong ===
- Market Square Shopping Centre, Geelong
- Waurn Ponds Shopping Centre, Waurn Ponds
- Westfield Geelong, Geelong

=== Regional ===
- Central Square, Ballarat
- Gateway Plaza, Warrnambool
- Horsham Plaza, Horsham
- Mildura Central, Mildura
- Riverside Plaza, Kialla
- Stockland Wendouree, Wendouree (Ballarat)
- Traralgon Centre Plaza, Traralgon
- Wodonga Plaza, Wodonga

== Western Australia ==
=== Perth CBD ===
- Carillon City (formerly Carillon Arcade and City Arcade), Perth
- enex100, Perth
- Forrest Chase, Perth
- Piccadilly Arcade, Perth
- Plaza Arcade, Perth
- Raine Square, Perth
- Watertown Brand Outlet Centre, West Perth

=== Perth metropolitan ===
- Armadale Shopping City
- Belmont Forum, Cloverdale
- Bull Creek Central
- Claremont Quarter
- Cockburn Gateway
- DFO Perth
- Dianella Plaza
- Dog Swamp Shopping Centre, Yokine
- Galleria Shopping Centre (formerly Centro Galleria and Westfield Galleria), Morley
- Home Co. Southlands Boulevarde, Willetton
- Karrinyup Shopping Centre
- Lakeside Joondalup
- Livingston Marketplace, Canning Vale
- Mandurah Forum
- Midland Gate
- Mirrabooka Square
- Ocean Keys, Clarkson
- Riverton Forum
- Rockingham Centre
- Stockland, Baldivis
- Stockland Shopping Centre, Harrisdale
- Victoria Park Central
- Westfield Booragoon
- Westfield Carousel, Cannington
- Westfield Innaloo
- Westfield Whitford City, Hillarys
- Warwick Grove

== See also ==
- List of largest shopping centres in Australia
- List of Westfield shopping centres in Australia
