= List of largest shopping centres in Australia =

Australian shopping centres by size

There are many different types of shopping centres in Australia. In 2018, the Shopping Centre Council of Australia Identified Australia has had 1,630 existing shopping centres, being defined as a major Integrated retail centre with at least 1,000 m^{2} (11,000 sq ft) of lettable retail floor-space, with over 67,000 specialty shops. Of the 1,630 shopping centres, 78 are defined as regional centres, 96 as central business district centres, 291 as sub-regional centres (being those that include at least one discount department store as the major anchor tenant) and 1,120 Neighbourhood or supermarket-based shopping centres. The remaining centres are smaller sub-regional centres, neighbourhood centres or speciality shops with typically less than 10,000 m^{2} (110,000 sq ft) gross leasable area. Regarding foot traffic, Rundle Mall in Adelaide receives the most annual visits with over 54 million in 2024, making it the busiest shopping precinct in the country and in the Southern Hemisphere.

== List by gross lettable area ==
Centre	Location	Suburb	State	Current size	
Centre	Location	Suburb	State	Area	Ref
1	Chadstone Shopping Centre	Malvern East	VIC	237,441 m^{2} (2,555,790 sq ft)	
2	Westfield Fountain Gate	Narre Warren	VIC	177,755 m^{2} (1,913,340 sq ft)	
3	Westfield Chermside	Chermside	QLD	175,553 m^{2} (1,889,640 sq ft)	
4	Eastland Shopping Centre	Ringwood	VIC	173,736 m^{2} (1,870,080 sq ft)	
5	Robina Town Centre	Robina	QLD	155,933 m^{2} (1,678,450 sq ft)	
6	Pacific Fair	Broadbeach	QLD	150,150 m^{2} (1,616,200 sq ft)	
7	Highpoint Shopping Centre	Maribyrnong	VIC	149,600 m^{2} (1,610,000 sq ft)	
8	Westfield Knox	Wantirna South	VIC	144,130 m^{2} (1,551,400 sq ft)	
9	Westfield Mt Gravatt (Garden City)	Upper Mount Gravatt	QLD	143,132 m^{2} (1,540,660 sq ft)	
10	Westfield Parramatta	Parramatta	NSW	140,070 m^{2} (1,507,700 sq ft)	
11	Macquarie Centre	Macquarie Park	NSW	138,500 m^{2} (1,491,000 sq ft)	
12	Westfield Marion	Oaklands Park	SA	137,105 m^{2} (1,475,790 sq ft)	
13	Westfield Carindale	Carindale	QLD	136,185 m^{2} (1,465,880 sq ft)	
14	Westfield Warringah Mall	Brookvale	NSW	132,102 m^{2} (1,421,930 sq ft)	
15	Westfield Bondi Junction	Bondi Junction	NSW	131,510 m^{2} (1,415,600 sq ft)	
16	Westfield Southland	Cheltenham	VIC	129,290 m^{2} (1,391,700 sq ft)	
17	Westfield Miranda	Miranda	NSW	128,607 m^{2} (1,384,310 sq ft)	
18	Westfield Doncaster	Doncaster	VIC	123,126 m^{2} (1,325,320 sq ft)	
19	Indooroopilly Shopping Centre	Indooroopilly	QLD	117,424 m^{2} (1,263,940 sq ft)	
20	Westfield North Lakes	North Lakes	QLD	115,109 m^{2} (1,239,020 sq ft)	
21	Erina Fair	Erina	NSW	114,993 m^{2} (1,237,770 sq ft)	
22	Castle Towers	Castle Hill	NSW	114,043 m^{2} (1,227,550 sq ft)	
23	Karrinyup Shopping Centre	Karrinyup	WA	114,000 m^{2} (1,230,000 sq ft)	
24	Westfield Carousel	Cannington	WA	109,747 m^{2} (1,181,310 sq ft)	
25	Pacific Werribee	Hoppers Crossing	VIC	109,325 m^{2} (1,176,760 sq ft)	
26	Macarthur Square	Campbelltown	NSW	108,100 m^{2} (1,164,000 sq ft)	
27	Sunshine Plaza	Maroochydore	QLD	106,600 m^{2} (1,147,000 sq ft)	
28	Logan Hyperdome	Shailer Park	QLD	104,481 m^{2} (1,124,620 sq ft)	
29	Lakeside Joondalup	Joondalup	WA	99,400 m^{2} (1,070,000 sq ft)	
30	Westfield Tea Tree Plaza	Modbury	SA	99,087 m^{2} (1,066,560 sq ft)	
31	Northland Shopping Centre	Preston	VIC	98,926 m^{2} (1,064,830 sq ft)	
32	Westfield Hornsby	Hornsby	NSW	98,012 m^{2} (1,054,990 sq ft)	
33	Westfield Belconnen	Belconnen	ACT	95,201 m^{2} (1,024,740 sq ft)	
34	Westfield Sydney	Sydney	NSW	91,765 m^{2} (987,750 sq ft)	
35	Westfield Penrith	Penrith	NSW	91,409 m^{2} (983,920 sq ft)	
36	Bayside Shopping Centre	Frankston	VIC	90,418 m^{2} (973,250 sq ft)	
37	Grand Central Shopping Centre	Toowoomba	QLD	90,000 m^{2} (970,000 sq ft)	
38	Colonnades Shopping Centre	Noarlunga Centre	SA	88,554 m^{2} (953,190 sq ft)	
39	Canberra Centre	Canberra City	ACT	89,500 m^{2} (963,000 sq ft)	
40	Charlestown Square	Charlestown	NSW	88,000 m^{2} (950,000 sq ft)	
41	Stockland Shellharbour	Shellharbour	NSW	87,766 m^{2} (944,710 sq ft)	
42	Bankstown Central	Bankstown	NSW	85,689 m^{2} (922,350 sq ft)	
43	Westfield Whitford City	Hillarys	WA	85,190 m^{2} (917,000 sq ft)	
44	Westfield Tuggerah	Tuggerah	NSW	85,154 m^{2} (916,590 sq ft)	
45	Westfield Eastgardens	Eastgardens	NSW	83,102 m^{2} (894,500 sq ft)	
46	Westfield Kotara	Kotara	NSW	82,462 m^{2} (887,610 sq ft)	
47	Westfield Liverpool	Liverpool	NSW	82,424 m^{2} (887,200 sq ft)	
48	Westfield Chatswood	Chatswood	NSW	80,999 m^{2} (871,870 sq ft)	
49	Wollongong Central	Wollongong	NSW	80,270 m^{2} (864,000 sq ft)	
50	The Glen	Glen Waverley	VIC	79,949 m^{2} (860,560 sq ft)	

== List by number of stores ==
The number of stores recorded in this list is approximate only, and subject to regular change.

Rank	Centre	Location	Number of stores	Ref(s)
1	Chadstone Shopping Centre	Malvern East, Victoria	530	
2	Westfield Chermside	Chermside, Queensland	515	
3	Eastland Shopping Centre	Ringwood, Victoria	503	
4	Westfield Bondi Junction	Bondi Junction, New South Wales	500	
5	Westfield Miranda	Miranda, New South Wales	500	
6	Westfield Parramatta	Parramatta, New South Wales	500	
7	Westfield Mt Gravatt	Upper Mount Gravatt, Queensland	470	
8	Highpoint Shopping Centre	Maribyrnong, Victoria	450	
9	Westfield Carindale	Carindale, Queensland	450	
10	Westfield Fountain Gate	Narre Warren, Victoria	424	
11	Pacific Fair	Broadbeach, Queensland	400	
12	Robina Town Centre	Robina, Queensland	400	
13	Westfield Doncaster	Doncaster, Victoria	413	
14	Westfield Knox	Wantirna South, Victoria	383	
15	Indooroopilly Shopping Centre	Indooroopilly, Queensland	366	
16	Macquarie Centre	Macquarie Park	360	
17	Macquarie Centre	Macquarie Park, New South Wales	350	
18	Westfield Liverpool	Liverpool, New South Wales	345	
19	Sunshine Plaza	Maroochydore, Queensland	345	
20	Westfield Penrith	Penrith, New South Wales	345	
21	Westfield Hornsby	Hornsby, New South Wales	335	
22	Macarthur Square	Campbelltown, New South Wales	330	
23	Erina Fair	Erina, New South Wales	330	
24	Westfield Carousel	Cannington, Western Australia	330	
25	Westfield Marion	Oaklands Park, South Australia	330	
26	Westfield Warringah Mall	Brookvale, New South Wales	330	
27	Bankstown Central	Bankstown, New South Wales	320	
28	Castle Towers	Castle Hill, New South Wales	310	
29	Westfield Eastgardens	Pagewood, New South Wales	305	
30	Westfield Whitford City	Hillarys, Western Australia	305	
31	Lakeside Joondalup	Joondalup, Western Australia	300	
32	Canberra Centre	City, Australian Capital Territory	300	
33	Karrinyup Shopping Centre	Karrinyup, Western Australia	300	
34	Melbourne Central Shopping Centre	Melbourne, Victoria	290	
35	Westpoint Blacktown	Blacktown, New South Wales	290	
37	Westfield Belconnen	Belconnen, Australian Capital Territory	290	
38	Westfield Sydney	Sydney, New South Wales	285	
38	Westfield North Lakes	North Lakes, Queensland	280	
39	Top Ryde City	Ryde, New South Wales	280	
40	Westfield Chatswood	Chatswood, New South Wales	280	
41	Westfield Booragoon	Booragoon, Western Australia	280	
42	Pacific Werribee	Hoppers Crossing, Victoria	275	
43	Westfield Tuggerah	Tuggerah, New South Wales	275	
44	Charlestown Square	Charlestown, New South Wales	270	
45	Westfield Hurstville	Hurstville, New South Wales	260	
46	Bayside Shopping Centre	Frankston, Victoria	260	
47	Westfield Tea Tree Plaza	Modbury, South Australia	260	
48	Northland Shopping Centre	Preston, Victoria	258	
49	Westfield Kotara	Kotara, New South Wales	255	
50	Westfield Woden	Phillip, Australian Capital Territory	255	

== See also ==
- List of shopping centres in Australia
- List of Westfield Group shopping centres in Australia
