= List of Westfield shopping centres =

The Westfield brand, first launched by the Australian Westfield Group in 1960, is currently used for over 80 shopping centres across Australia, New Zealand, the European Union, the United Kingdom and the United States.

Westfield is a brand name for retail shopping centres originated by the Australian Westfield Group in 1960, and now shared between Scentre Group (for Westfield centres in Australia and New Zealand), Unibail-Rodamco-Westfield (for Westfield centres in the European Union, the United Kingdom and the United States), and Cenomi (for Westfield centres in Saudi Arabia).

== Current Scentre Group centres ==
Westfield-branded shopping centres in Australia and New Zealand are owned and operated by Scentre Group.

=== Australia ===
==== Australian Capital Territory ====
- Westfield Belconnen
- Westfield Woden

==== New South Wales ====
- Westfield Bondi Junction
- Westfield Burwood
- Westfield Chatswood
- Westfield Eastgardens
- Westfield Hornsby
- Westfield Hurstville
- Westfield Kotara
- Westfield Liverpool
- Westfield Miranda
- Westfield Mount Druitt
- Westfield Parramatta
- Westfield Penrith
- Westfield Sydney
- Westfield Tuggerah
- Westfield Warringah Mall

==== South Australia ====
- Westfield Marion
- Westfield Tea Tree Plaza
- Westfield West Lakes

==== Victoria ====
- Westfield Airport West
- Westfield Doncaster
- Westfield Fountain Gate
- Westfield Geelong
- Westfield Knox
- Westfield Plenty Valley
- Westfield Southland

==== Queensland ====
- Westfield Carindale
- Westfield Chermside
- Westfield Coomera
- Westfield Helensvale
- Westfield Mt Gravatt
- Westfield North Lakes

==== Western Australia ====
- Westfield Booragoon
- Westfield Carousel
- Westfield Innaloo
- Westfield Whitford City

=== New Zealand ===
- Westfield Albany
- Westfield Manukau City
- Westfield Newmarket
- Westfield Riccarton
- Westfield St Lukes

== Current Unibail-Rodamco-Westfield centres branded as Westfield ==
Westfield-branded shopping centres in the European Union, the United Kingdom and the United States are owned and operated by Unibail-Rodamco-Westfield.

=== European Union ===
==== Austria ====
- Westfield Donau Zentrum (in German)
- Westfield Shopping City Süd

==== Czech Republic ====
- Westfield Chodov
- Westfield Černý Most

==== France ====
- Westfield Carré Sénart
- Westfield CNIT
- Westfield Euralille
- Westfield Forum Les Halles
- Westfield Les Quatre Temps
- Westfield Parly 2
- Westfield La Part-Dieu
- Westfield Rosny 2
- Westfield Vélizy 2

==== Germany ====
- Westfield Centro
- Westfield Hamburg-Überseequartier
- Westfield Ruhr Park

==== Netherlands ====
- Westfield Mall of the Netherlands

==== Poland ====
- Westfield Arkadia
- Westfield Mokotów
- Westfield Wroclavia

==== Spain ====
- Westfield Glòries
- Westfield La Maquinista
- Westfield Parquesur

==== Sweden ====
- Westfield Mall of Scandinavia
- Westfield Täby Centrum

=== United Kingdom ===
==== England ====
- Westfield London
- Westfield Stratford City

==== Scotland ====
- Westfield St. James Quarter

=== United States ===
==== California ====
- Westfield Century City
- Westfield Culver City
- Westfield Fashion Square
- Westfield Galleria at Roseville
- Westfield Topanga
- Westfield Valley Fair
- Westfield UTC

==== Illinois ====
- Westfield Old Orchard

==== Maryland ====
- Westfield Montgomery
- Westfield Wheaton

==== New Jersey ====
- Westfield Garden State Plaza

==== New York ====
- Westfield World Trade Center (managed, owned by the Port Authority of New York and New Jersey)

==== Washington ====
- Westfield Southcenter

== Current Cenomi centres branded as Westfield ==
=== Saudi Arabia ===
- Westfield Riyadh (opening 2026)
- Westfield Dammam
- Westfield Jeddah

== See also ==
- List of shopping centres in Australia
