= List of Scentre Group properties =

The following is a list of properties owned by Scentre Group, an Australian commercial real estate company with assets in Australia and New Zealand. Their portfolio includes a number of Westfield-branded shopping centres that were originally owned by Westfield Group, and spun-off into the Scentre Group in 2014.

== Australia ==
=== Australian Capital Territory ===
- Westfield Belconnen
- Westfield Woden

=== New South Wales ===
- Westfield Bondi Junction
- Westfield Burwood
- Westfield Chatswood
- Westfield Eastgardens
- Westfield Hornsby
- Westfield Hurstville
- Westfield Kotara
- Westfield Liverpool
- Westfield Miranda
- Westfield Mount Druitt
- Westfield Parramatta
- Westfield Penrith
- Westfield Sydney
- Westfield Tuggerah
- Westfield Warringah Mall

=== South Australia ===
- Westfield Marion
- Westfield Tea Tree Plaza
- Westfield West Lakes

=== Victoria ===
- Westfield Airport West
- Westfield Doncaster
- Westfield Fountain Gate
- Westfield Geelong
- Westfield Knox
- Westfield Plenty Valley
- Westfield Southland

=== Queensland ===
- Westfield Carindale
- Westfield Chermside
- Westfield Coomera
- Westfield Helensvale
- Westfield Mt Gravatt
- Westfield North Lakes

=== Western Australia ===
- Westfield Booragoon
- Westfield Carousel
- Westfield Innaloo
- Westfield Whitford City

== New Zealand ==
- Westfield Albany
- Westfield Manukau City
- Westfield Newmarket
- Westfield St Lukes
- Westfield Riccarton

== Former centres ==
This list includes centres which were owned by the original Westfield Group.

=== New South Wales ===
- Blacktown (1959–1973, demolished in 2004)
- Baulkham Hills (1963–TBC)
- Dee Why (1963–TBC), now Dee Why Town Centre)
- Eastwood (1963–TBC), now Eastwood Village)
- Maroubra (1963–TBC)
- Yagoona (1963–TBC)
- Centrepoint (2001–2010, now Westfield Sydney)
- Figtree (1965–2015, currently owned by 151 Property, a subsidiary of The Blackstone Group)
- North Rocks (1982–2015, currently owned by Challenger Group)
- Warrawong (1985–2015, currently owned by 151 Property, a subsidiary of The Blackstone Group)

=== Victoria ===
- Casey Central Shopping Centre in Narre Warren. The Westfield Group obtained 50% joint ownership with AMP in October 2006 for A$51 million. Scentre Group sold this centre to British investment giant M&G Real Estate.

=== Queensland ===
- Indooroopilly Shopping Centre (1970–2000, currently owned by Eureka Funds Management)
- Toombul Shopping Centre (1967–2003, sold to Centro Properties Group (renamed to Vicinity Centres), currently owned by Mirvac)
- Strathpine (1983–2015, currently owned by 151 Property, a subsidiary of The Blackstone Group)

=== South Australia ===
- Armada Arndale, Kilkenny (formerly Westfield Arndale)

=== Western Australia ===
- Galleria Shopping Centre (Perth), (1996–2003, sold to Centro Properties Group (renamed to Vicinity Centres), previously called Westfield Galleria)

=== New Zealand ===
- Chartwell Shopping Centre, Hamilton, sold to Stride Property in November 2015
- Downtown Shopping Centre, Auckland CBD, (formerly Westfield Downtown), demolished in 2016 to make way for a new development and the City Rail Link train tunnel.
- Glenfield Mall, Glenfield, Auckland (formerly Westfield Glenfield), sold to Ladstone Glenfield Ltd. in November 2015
- Pakuranga Plaza, Pakuranga, Auckland (formerly Westfield Pakuranga), sold to GYP Properties in October 2014
- Queensgate Shopping Centre, Lower Hutt, sold to Stride Property in November 2015
- Shore City Shopping Centre, Takapuna, Auckland (formerly Westfield Shore City), sold its 50% share to Aviva Investors in June 2012
- WestCity Waitakere, Henderson, Auckland (formerly Westfield WestCity), sold to Australian family business Angaet Group in February 2017.

== See also ==
- List of Westfield shopping centres
- List of shopping centres in Australia
- List of shopping centres in New Zealand
