= Robina Town Centre =

Shopping centre in Gold Coast, Queensland

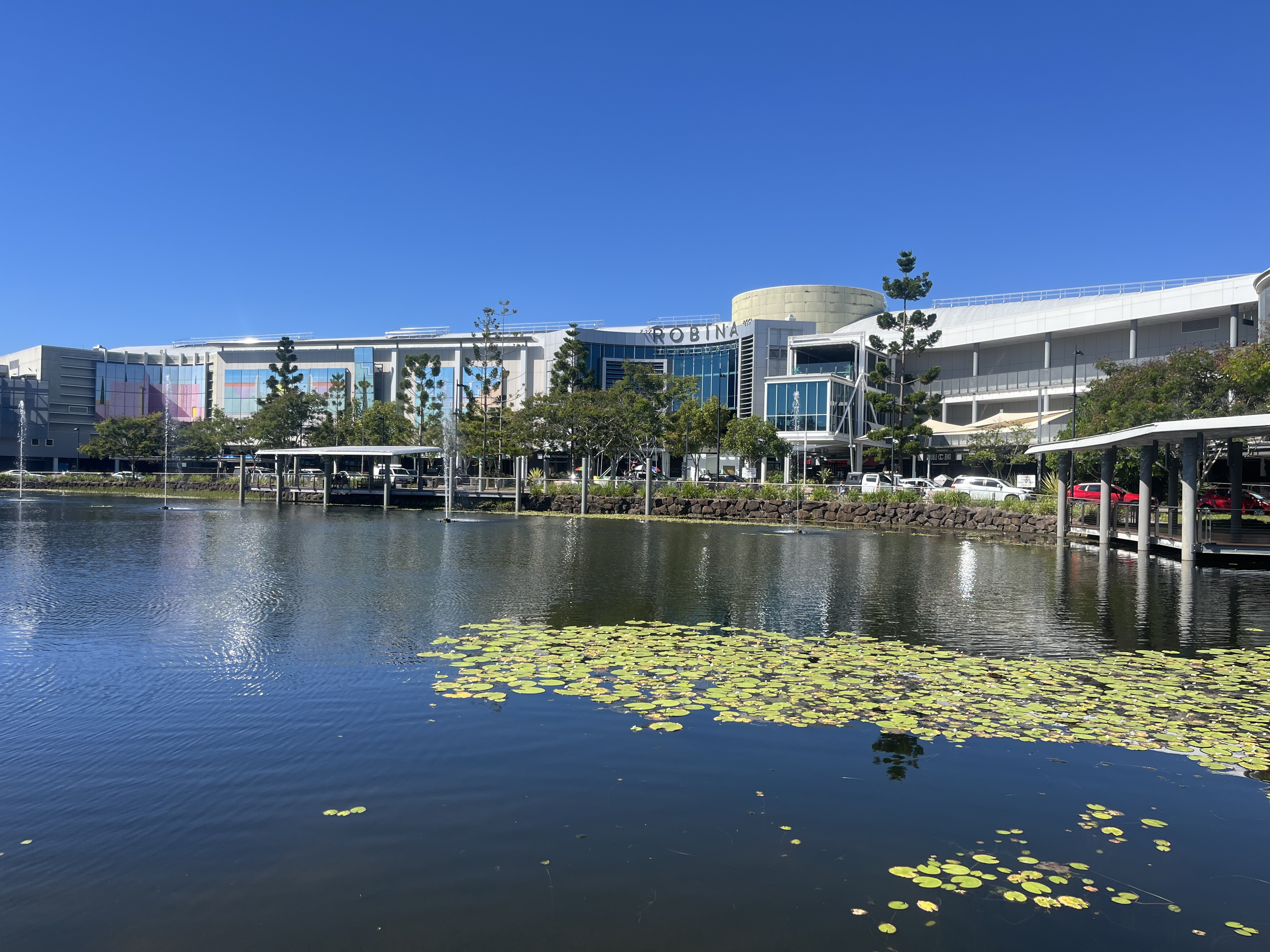
- Location: Robina, Queensland, Australia
- Coordinates: 28°04′35″S 153°23′07″E
- Opened: 28 April 1996; 30 years ago
- Owner: Queensland Investment Corporation
- Num. of stores: Over 400
- Num. of anchor tenants: 7
- Floor area: 138,000 square metres (1,490,000 sq ft)
- Floors: 5
- Parking: approx. 6,000
- Website: robinatowncentre.com.au

Robina Town Centre is a large shopping centre on the Gold Coast, Australia. The site covers 34 hectares (84 acres) in the suburb of Robina, with seven anchor tenants and over 400 retail outlets covering over 130,000 square metres (1,400,000 sq ft).

== History ==
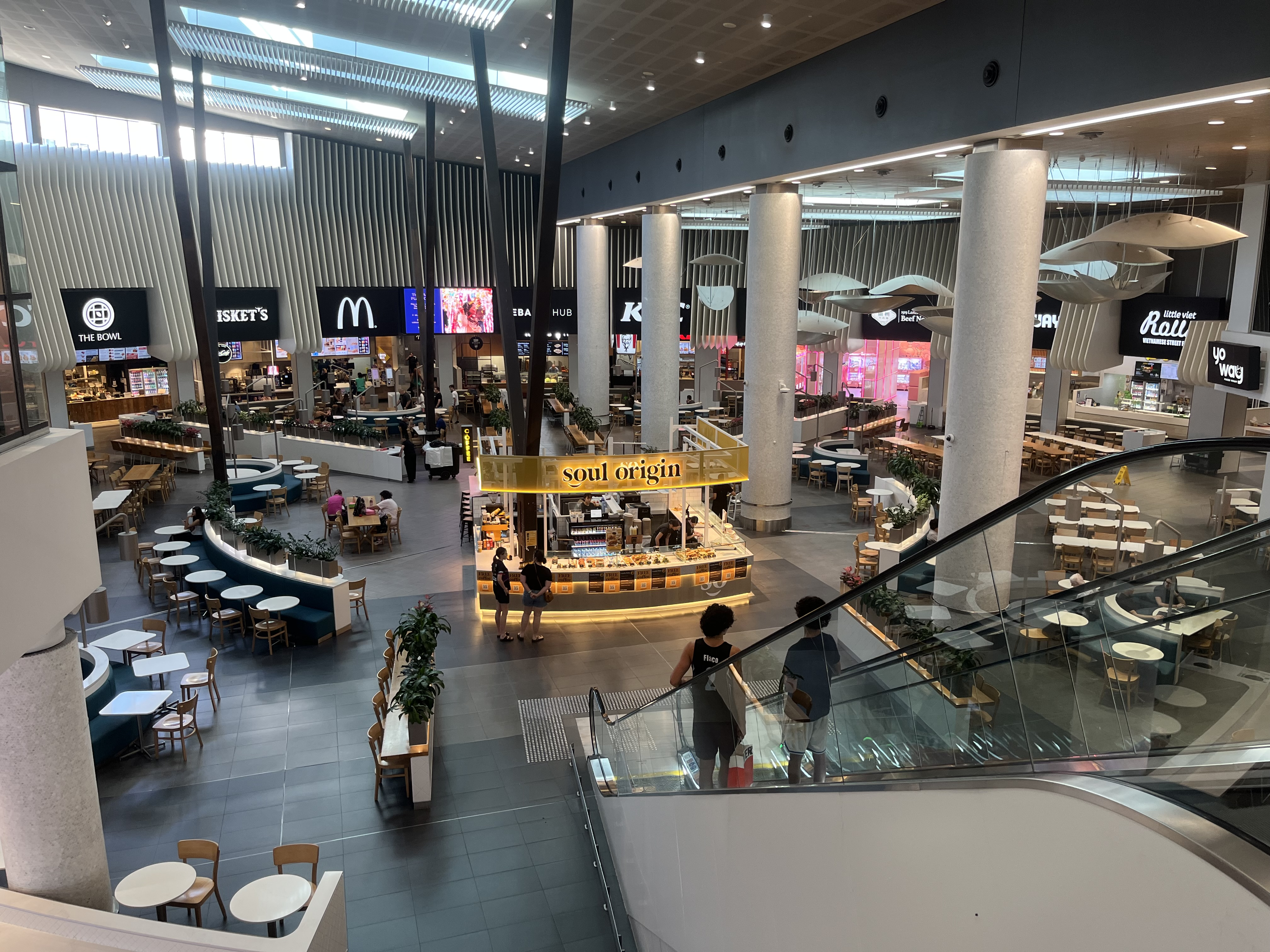
The Food Atrium at Robina Town Centre.

Construction began on the centre in 1994 on land that was previously paddocks and bushland, and it was at the time the largest mall in Australia to be built in a single development period.

Stage One of the development opened in late April 1996, and Stage Two, with two extra levels of shopping, opened in late August 1996. The original stages were characterised by a central courtyard with a clocktower, fountains and masonry structures, open-air avenues, and a food court raised on a large balcony.

The centre has since been taken over by the Queensland Investment Corporation from the original developers Robina Land Corporation and redevelopment and refurbishment has occurred in 2002–2003, 2007–2010 and 2014–2016. The 2007-2010 redevelopment cost A$400 million.

In 1998, the centre received a commendation from the Royal Australian Institute of Architects. Robina Library was housed on a lower level of Robina Town Centre near the lake until relocating off-site in 2000.

In May 2015, a new mall opened adjacent to Market Hall with a 4,200 square metres (45,000 sq ft) Coles Store and an additional 1,500 square metres (16,000 sq ft) of retail space. Stage 2B of Market Hall (The Kitchens) opened in late 2016 with 55 new retailers.

In November 2026, the David Jones store in the centre was included on a list of 19 stores planned to close after the 2026 holiday season.

== Parking and transport ==
Robina Town Centre has an intelligent parking system, with parking assist bays and empty parking indicators to assist in finding a space. With approximately 6,000 car parks available, mostly undercover, the parking assist works using sensors above parks with LED indicators if a park is empty (green) or taken (red).

== See also ==
- List of shopping centres in Australia
