= Eastland Shopping Centre =

Shopping Centre in Ringwood, Victoria, Australia

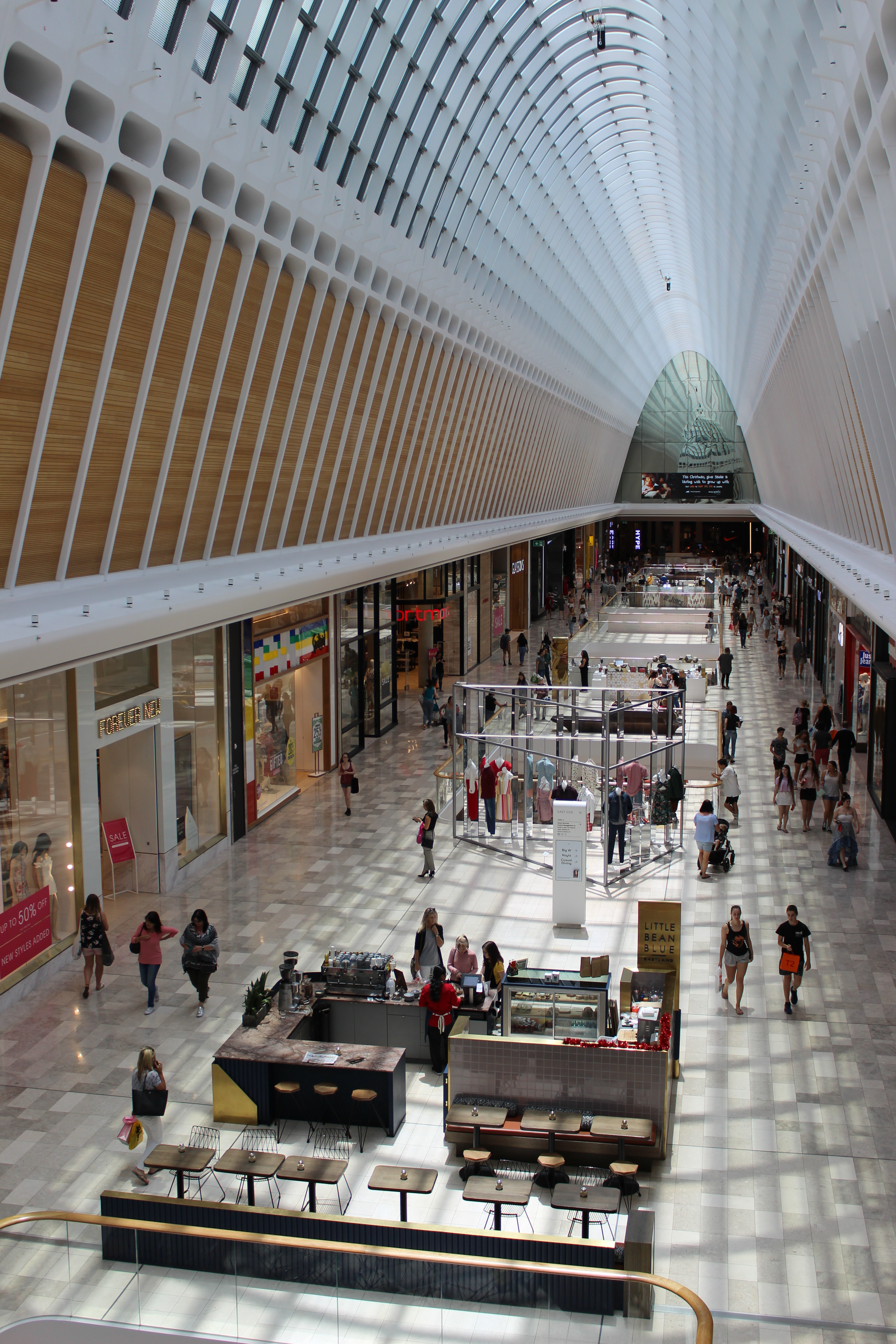
- Location: Ringwood, Victoria, Australia
- Coordinates: 37°48′47″S 145°13′45″E
- Address: 175 Maroondah Highway
- Opened: 31 October 1967; 59 years ago
- Developer: Queensland Investment Corporation
- Owner: Queensland Investment Corporation
- Num. of stores: 503
- Num. of anchor tenants: 7
- Floor area: 173,440 m^{2} (1,866,900 sq ft)
- Floors: 3
- Parking: 5300
- Public transit: Ringwood; Bus routes 271, 364, 370, 668, 669, 670, 679, 684, 742, 901
- Website: eastland.qicre.com

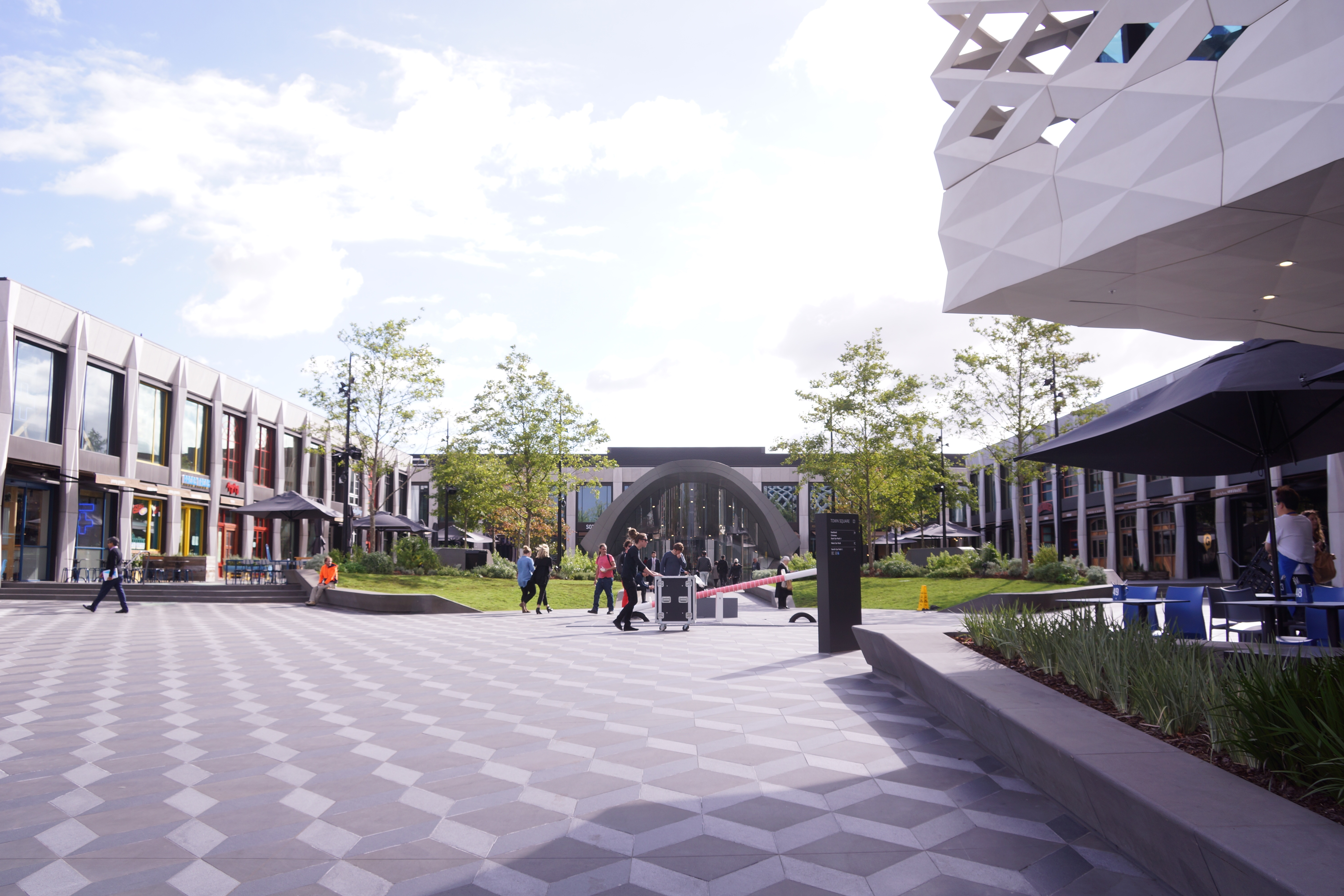
Eastland Town Square

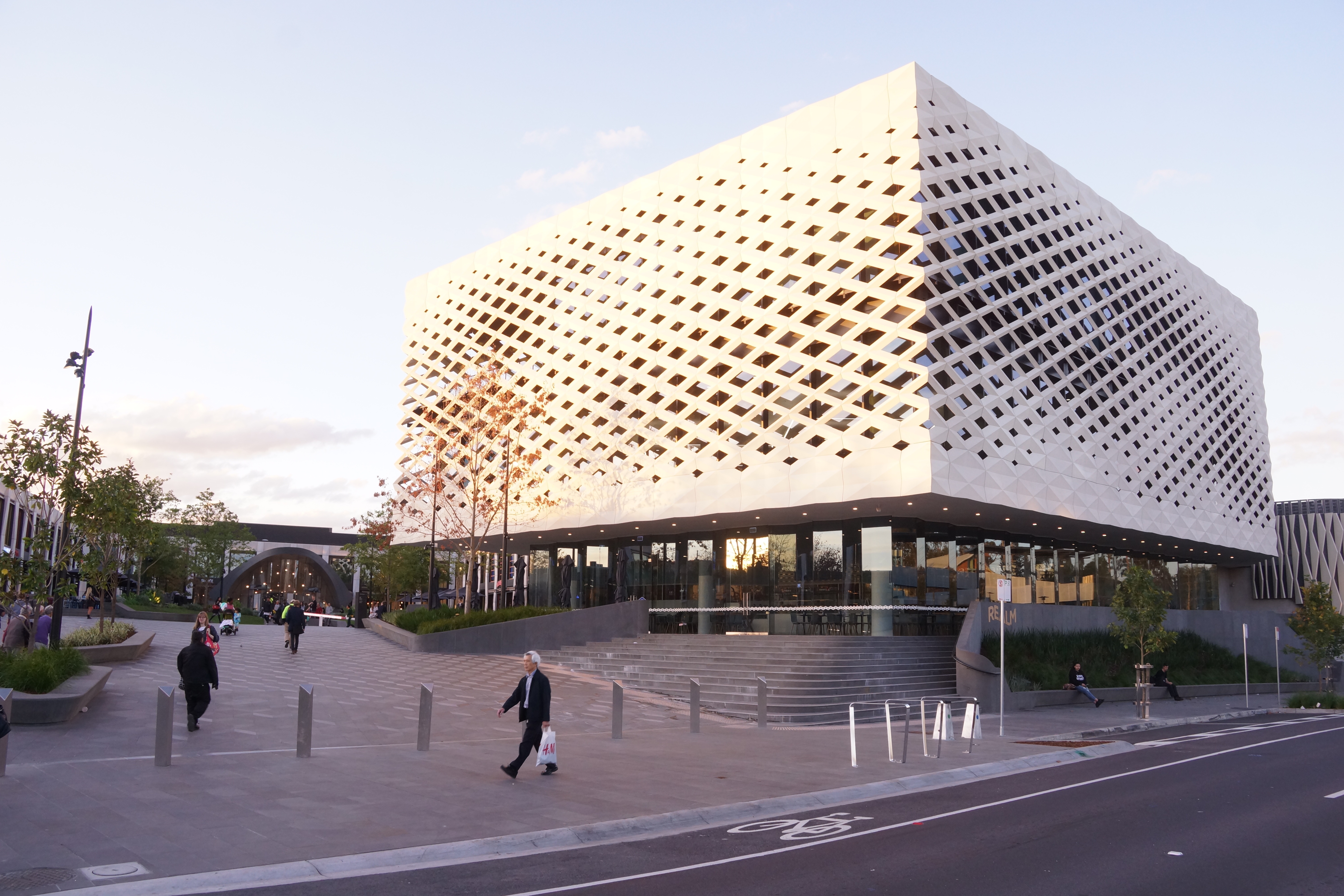
Realm Library on Eastland Town Square

Eastland Shopping Centre is a large, indoor shopping centre complex located in the eastern Melbourne suburb of Ringwood, Victoria, Australia. The fourth-largest shopping centre in Australia, it first opened on 31 October 1967 and has since grown to host over 503 retail stores and services.

It is adjacent to Maroondah Highway, Ringwood railway station and a major bus interchange. The centre features two main levels of shops, with a third level containing a Hoyts 12-screen cinema complex and restaurants, forming a total of approximately 530 stores. Eastland also contains a library, 120 room hotel and large outdoor dining precinct. It is the largest shopping centre in the City of Maroondah.

== History ==
=== Inception ===
Eastland was one of three large shopping centres planned by the department store Myer in Melbourne in 1960. Together with Northland in Preston and Southland in Cheltenham, these were the first indoor shopping centres in Victoria.

After years of planning, the tender from Eastland Shopping Centre Pty. Ltd. was accepted by Ringwood City Council on 1 February 1966. It was leased from the Council for 30 years on the site of a public park and sportsground. Some private properties were also compulsorily acquired by the Council to make way for the centre, including 13 houses, 14 shops and a private hospital. This was unsuccessfully challenged by the landowners in the High Court of Australia. It was the first time that these compulsory acquisition powers were used by a local government in Victoria.

The plan for a new shopping centre in Ringwood was heralded by some, believing it would bring new investment and people into the area, and opposed by others, who feared traffic congestion and other impacts from the forecast 150,000 extra visitors to the area.

=== Construction ===
Construction commenced on the two-level enclosed complex in July 1966 on the site of a former sporting field. This caused significant disruption and change in Ringwood, now seen as an increasingly important suburban centre. The Ringwood Clock Tower, located on the corner of Main Street and Warrandyte Road, was moved to make way for construction of new roads and car parking to service the new buildings. It remains today on this new site on the corner of Main Street and the Maroondah Highway. Many existing buildings and vegetation were also demolished or moved.

The complex was finished on 31 October 1967. Myer and Safeway were the major anchor tenants together with 40 speciality stores and a 1250 space car park. The initial centre cost $13,000,000 (1966) ($167,568,115.94 (2017)) to construct on a 5.67-hectare (14.0-acre) parcel of land just north of the Maroondah Highway.

There was a minor expansion in 1973 when two new storeys and a carpark were built by demolishing houses on nearby Ringwood Street.

=== Redevelopment (1993-1995) ===
In 1993, a massive redevelopment of the centre was announced. This $120 million project involved the demolition of the existing centre in its entirety except for the 4-storey Myer building which was instead refurbished. More existing commercial and residential buildings were demolished to make way for new car parking. After a series of three staged openings, the 'new look' Eastland was relaunched in May 1995 after it closed in March 1994. This extension brought the centre to 53,300 m^{2} (574,000 sq ft) with major retailers Myer, Woolworths and Kmart and 170 specialty retailers.

In December 1996, the Queensland Investment Corporation (QIC) purchased Coles Myer's 50% shareholding.

=== First expansion (2002) ===
In early 2001, QIC announced plans for an expansion of the new buildings. This included a Hoyts 12 screen cinema complex, new restaurants (including a Pancake Parlour), a Big W store, and a Bi-Lo Mega Fresh store. A regular Bi-Lo store opened instead in October 2002 with the cinemas opening on Boxing day later in the same year. This brought an additional 50 specialty stores to the centre, increasing its retail area by approximately 25,000 m^{2} (270,000 sq ft) and bringing the total number of car parking spaces to 4,878.

=== Second expansion (2013-2016) ===
Plans for further expansion of the centre were created in the mid-2000s. This was partially funded by the State Government committing $44.5 million over 2007 and 2008 for planning and construction. Development was originally scheduled to commence in 2009 but this was delayed due to the 2008 financial crisis.

Enabling works commenced in 2012 allowing for changes to be made to the Eastern Multilevel carpark; the entry ramp to the third level of the carpark was moved, and the Kmart Tyre & Auto Service centre was relocated to the North-Western carpark.

QIC publicly unveiled the plans on 28 October 2013. The $665 million redevelopment expanded retail space from 80,000 to 113,000 m^{2} (860,000 to 1,220,000 sq ft) and included construction of an additional three storeys connecting the southern end of the centre with the Maroondah Highway. This included a new entrance to the third level of Myer, an outdoor public square with food and beverage outlets and a new public library. Office and hotel towers were also proposed adjacent to the new precinct together with a Target.

The first stage of the redevelopment opened almost two years later in October 2015 with the second on 5 May 2016.

=== Future development ===
The adjacent Ringwood Market site, built in 1984, is also owned by the same company that controls Eastland. It was demolished in 2009 to make way for a new retail/commercial development. The 12,000 m^{2} (130,000 sq ft) space was planned to be occupied by one of Costco, IKEA and Masters Home Improvement shops. Since then, Melbourne's second Costco Australia store was confirmed with construction commencing in August 2012. The 14,500-square-metre (156,000 sq ft) store was opened on 20 November 2013, although a planned underground connection to Eastland was not built.

A second office tower on Bond Street opened in 2024 on the property next to Costco.

In January 2024, David Jones closed their store at Eastland. The former David Jones store was replaced by a relocated H&M in December of 2024.

Rebel Sport would relocate to the former H&M store, opening up a ‘Rebel RCX’ store, one of the biggest in suburban Melbourne, on August 21st, 2025.

After much speculation on what would replace the former Rebel Sport, the center announced that TK Maxx would open on the 26th of February, 2026.

== Retail ==
Major retailers include Myer, H&M, Uniqlo, Target, Kmart, Big W, Harris Scarfe, Cotton On, Woolworths, Coles, Rebel Sport, JB Hi-Fi and TK Maxx.

== Legacy and significance ==
Eastland was the first indoor shopping centre to be built in the eastern suburbs of Melbourne.

The band AC/DC performed at Eastland in September 1975 as part of their High Voltage tour of Australia.
