= Kings Cross Centre =

- Location: Potts Point, New South Wales, Australia
- Coordinates: 33°52′30″S 151°13′21″E
- Address: 82/94 Darlinghurst Road
- Opened: 2008; 18 years ago
- Manager: Wingdom Group
- Owner: Wingdom Group
- Num. of stores: 30
- Num. of anchor tenants: 1
- Floors: 3
- Public transit: Kings Cross railway station
- Website: www.kxcentre.com

Kings Cross Centre is a shopping centre in Kings Cross, a locality in the inner-city suburb of Potts Point. It is located underneath the Coca-Cola billboard and Zenith residential apartments.

== History ==
In 1971 the Kingsgate Hotel and restaurants opened and the Coca-Cola billboard opened in 1974 underneath the apartments. The hotel was later renamed as Millenium Hotel. In 1981 it was renamed to Hyatt Kingsgate which operated until its closure in 2003 following the 2000 Summer Olympics and later on the "oversupply" of hotel rooms.

In 2006 the former Hyatt Kingsgate hotel was redeveloped to apartments and was eventually sold off. The lower levels of the former hotel was converted to a nightclub and a shopping centre in 2008. The shopping centre is known as Kings Cross Centre and featured 28 stores on the ground level and a two-level Coles and Liquorland in the basement level.

On 10 May 2018 Holey Moley opened its flagship mini golf and bar in the former nightclub space underneath the Coca-Cola billboard.

== Transport ==
The Eastern Suburbs line offer frequent services to Kings Cross station which is located diagonally opposite the centre.

Kings Cross Centre has Transdev John Holland operated bus services to Sydney CBD and the Eastern Suburbs, as well as local surrounding suburbs. The majority of its bus services are located Bayswater and Darlinghurst Roads.
