= Carindale bus station =

Bus station in Brisbane, Australia

Coordinates: 27°30′13.49″S 153°06′10.69″E

Carindale
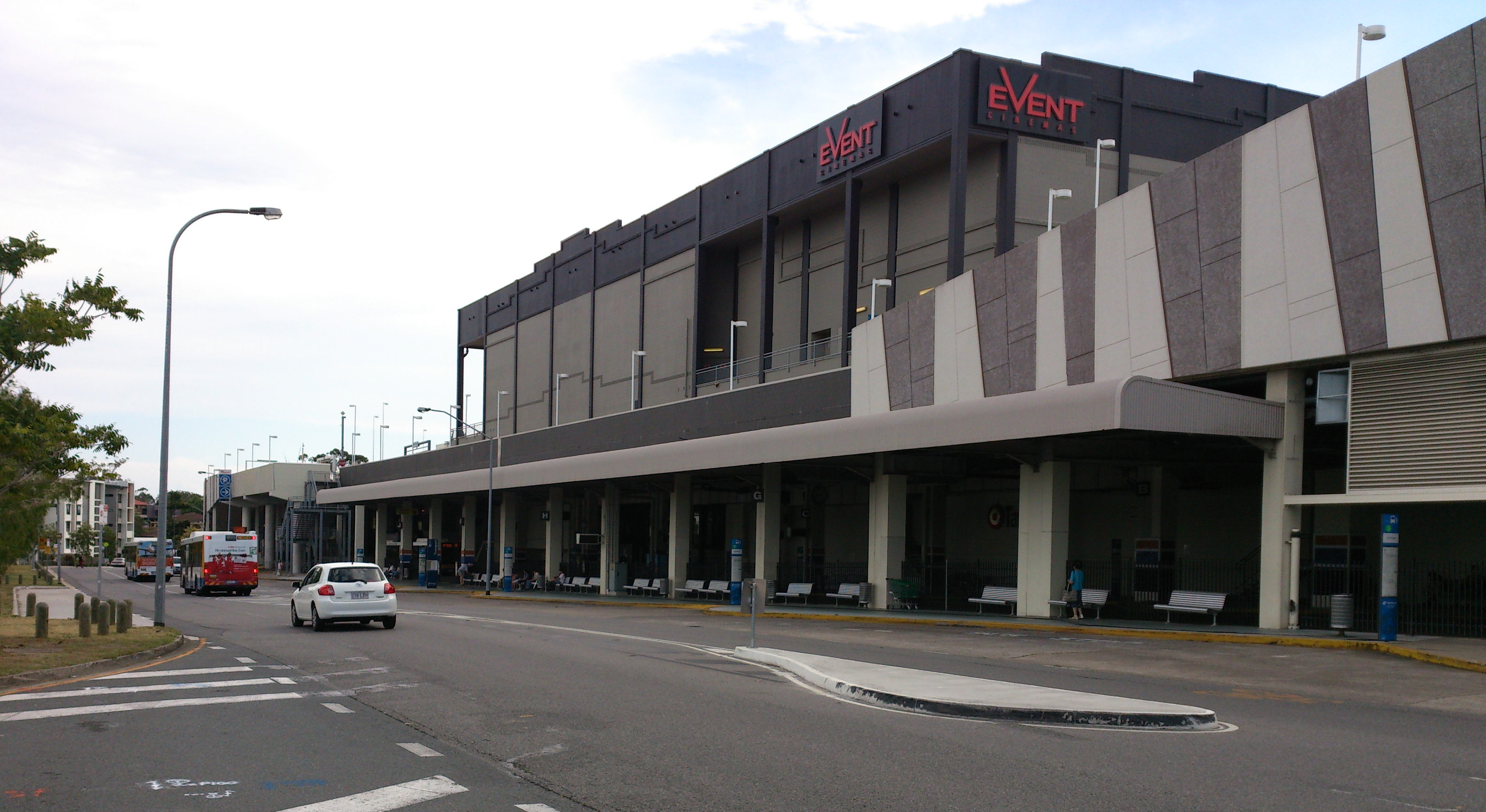

General information
- Location: Carindale Street, Carindale
- Owner: Department of Transport & Main Roads
- Operator: Transport for Brisbane
- Platforms: 2
- Bus stands: 10

Construction
- Accessible: Yes

Other information
- Fare zone: 2

History
- Opened: 11 March 1991
Location

Carindale is a bus station operated by Translink. It opened in 1991 and is located at Westfield Carindale in the Brisbane suburb of Carindale. It is a ground level station, featuring two side platforms with ten bus stands.

== History ==
It was first used on 11 March 1991, being officially opened on 1 July 1991.

The station in its present location was constructed as part of renovations to the neighbouring Carindale shopping centre in the 1990s. Subsequent renovations to the station have included minor improvements, such as the addition of electronic passenger information displays, improved CCTV surveillance and tactile paving as well as changes to access between the bus station and the shopping centre.

The station is under cover but is not enclosed or air-conditioned. It is configured in two platforms – the inner being adjacent to the shopping centre and the outer being an island exposed to Carindale Street. One stop was removed from the original configuration to make way for a centrally located pedestrian crossing between the two platforms. A holding stand and bus turning bay is located on the opposite side of the street. Stops A and B provide facilities for articulated buses, although no buses of this type currently service the station.

The station is also the terminus of a Personalised Public Transport (PPT) taxi service operated by the Brisbane City Council. The PPT route operates independently of the TransLink system and services areas of Carindale Hills which do not have a dedicated bus service.

No dedicated public parking facilities are provided, and in July 2012 Westfield introduced paid parking as a means of discouraging commuter parking within the shopping centre.

== Eastern Busway ==
The station will be near the proposed Carindale busway station to be built on the Eastern Busway.

No specific date has been announced for commencement of construction, however, since the opening of the first sections of the Eastern Busway in 2009 and 2011, many routes servicing the Carindale bus station now travel via the completed sections of the Eastern Busway.
