= Caneland Central =

- Location: Mackay, Australia
- Coordinates: 21°08′19″S 149°10′41″E
- Opened: 1979
- Manager: Sentinel Property Group
- Num. of stores: ~240
- Num. of anchor tenants: 10
- Floor area: 62,500 m^{2} (673,000 sq ft)
- Floors: 2
- Website: www.canelandcentral.com.au

Caneland Central is a regional shopping centre located adjacent to the Pioneer River in Mackay, Queensland, Australia. The centre has stores including a Myer department store, Coles and Woolworths supermarkets, Big W and Target discount department stores, Best & Less and Pillowtalk stores as well as the electronic store JB Hi-Fi. The centre is home to over 230 specialty stores, of which the majority are related to fashion. Caneland houses two foodcourts, including one overlooking the Pioneer River.

Caneland Central opened in 1979. In December 2022, Caneland Central was sold by Lendlease’s Australian Prime Property Fund Retail to the Sentinel Property Group.
