= Nambour Plaza =

- Location: Nambour, Queensland
- Owner: PPI Funds Management
- Floors: 1
- Parking: 600
- Website: http://www.nambourplaza.com.au/

Nambour Plaza is a sub-regional shopping centre located in Nambour on the Sunshine Coast, Queensland. The 11,282 square metre centre includes anchor tenants, Woolworths and Big W and 40 speciality stores.

== Nambour Central ==
Neighbouring the plaza is Nambour Central, a small 3,196sqm community shopping mall with about five retailers. Above the mall is also an office suite.
