= The Strand at Coolangatta =

Shopping centre in Coolangatta, Gold Coast, Queensland

The Strand at Coolangatta is a shopping centre in Coolangatta, Gold Coast, Queensland. Anchor tenants include Woolworths and Aldi. It was built from 1988 to 1990.
