= Grand Central Shopping Centre =

Grand Central
- Location: Toowoomba, Queensland Australia
- Coordinates: 27°33′39″S 151°56′55″E
- Opened: September 1996; 30 years ago
- Developer: Queensland Investment Corporation
- Manager: Queensland Investment Corporation
- Owner: Queensland Investment Corporation
- Num. of stores: 136 (approx)
- Num. of anchor tenants: 8
- Floor area: 90,000 m^{2} (970,000 sq ft) (approx)
- Parking: 4,000 (approx)
- Website: grandcentralshopping.qicre.com

Grand Central Shopping Centre is a retail shopping centre in Toowoomba, Queensland, Australia. Owned by the Queensland Investment Corporation, it is the largest shopping centre in the Darling Downs, with the first stage opening in September 1996. A second stage opened in June 1999, and a third in 2017.

It features a Target, Coles, Birch, Carroll & Coyle five-screen cinema, a Kmart, Woolworths, Big W, Myer, Søstrene Grene, Best & Less, and H&M and over 180 specialty stores over three levels. In November 2014, a $500 million redevelopment commenced that doubled the floor area to 90,000 m^{2} and the number of parking spaces to 4,000. It was completed in early 2017. New anchor tenants include Country Road, Esprit and H&M among others, taking its size to over 90,000 m^{2} (970,000 sq ft).
