= Westfield Coomera =

- Location: Coomera, Queensland
- Coordinates: 27°51′09″S 153°18′54″E
- Address: Foxwell Road
- Opened: 11 October 2018
- Developer: Queensland Investment Corporation; Scentre Group
- Manager: Scentre Group
- Owner: Queensland Investment Corporation (50%); Scentre Group (50%)
- Num. of stores: 140
- Num. of anchor tenants: 6
- Public transit: Coomera railway station Kinetic Gold Coast bus services
- Website: www.westfield.com.au/coomera

Westfield Coomera is a shopping centre in the Gold Coast suburb of Coomera in Queensland, Australia. It is located adjacent to the Coomera railway station and 500 metres from the Pacific Motorway that connects Coomera with the southern suburbs of the Gold Coast as well as Brisbane. Westfield Coomera was developed by the Scentre Group and is planned to be the heart of the booming northern region of the Gold Coast. The shopping centre opened on 11 October 2018.

== Construction ==
The development was initially announced in August 2017, after being approved by the Gold Coast City Council after almost 20 years of planning and debate. Westfield Coomera was expected to cost approximately $470 million and create 7,500 jobs during both the construction and operating phase of the new shopping centre. It was developed by the Queensland Investment Corporation and Scentre Group.

=== Layout ===
The new shopping centre precinct opened with 140 specialty stores, anchored by Woolworths, Coles, Kmart, Target, Event Cinemas and later H&M.
