= Westfield Chermside =

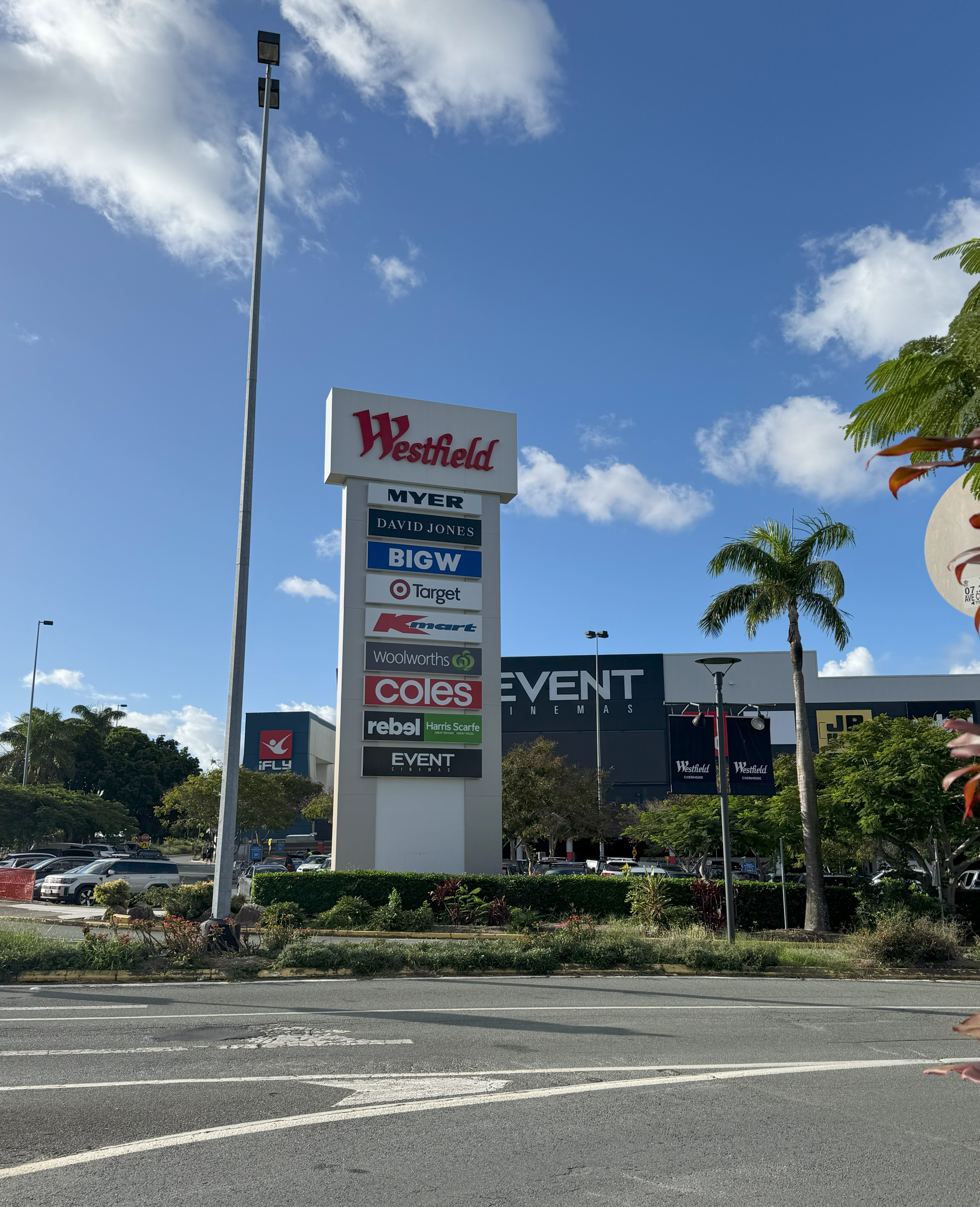
- Gympie Road entry to Westfield Chermside in April 2025
- Location: Chermside, Queensland, Australia
- Coordinates: 27°22′58″S 153°02′01″E
- Address: Gympie Road
- Opened: 31 May 1957
- Manager: Scentre Group
- Owner: Scentre Group
- Num. of stores: 486
- Num. of anchor tenants: 10
- Floor area: 176,585 m^{2} (1,900,745 sq ft)
- Floors: 4
- Parking: 7,000 spaces
- Public transit: Chermside bus station
- Website: www.westfield.com.au/chermside

Westfield Chermside (colloquially known as Chermside or Chermy) is a major indoor/outdoor shopping centre in the northern suburb of Chermside in Brisbane, Queensland.

== Transport ==
Chermside bus station is a bus transit hub for the area. Many bus routes commence and terminate at this bus station. It is served by Transport for Brisbane services.

Westfield Chermside has multi-level car parks with 7,200 spaces.

== History ==
=== 20th century ===
==== Mid-1950s: construction ====
Construction of Chermside Drive-In Shopping Centre began in October 1955 on the site of what was originally Early’s Paddock. The site was prone to flooding and 6-foot drainage pipes were constructed underneath the complex to carry Somerset Creek under the car park to Downfall Creek to overcome this issue.

==== Late 1950s opening ====
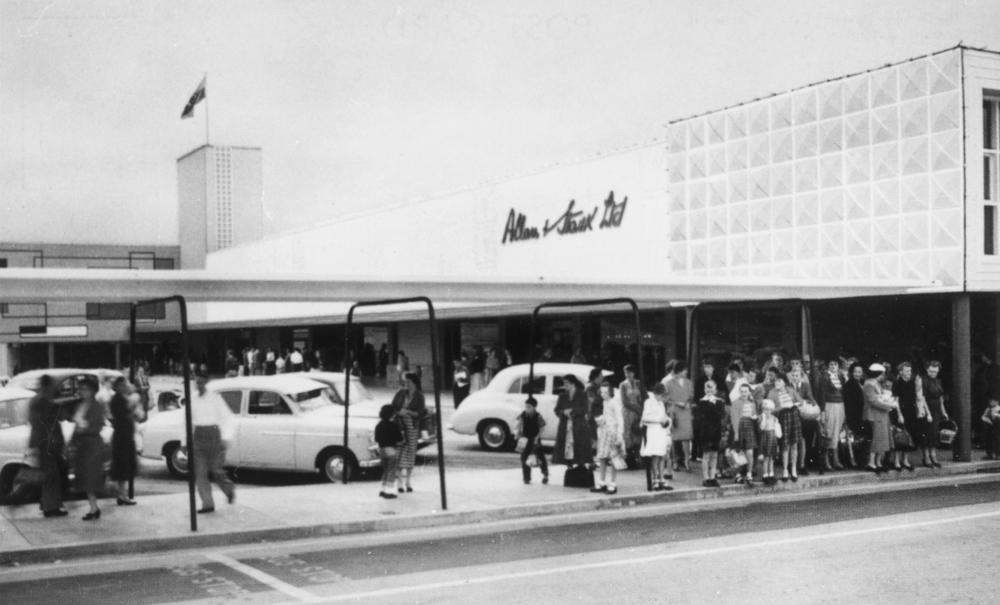
A bus station was integrated into the centre from its opening and trams stopped nearby

Chermside Drive-In Shopping Centre opened on 30 May 1957 by the Premier of Queensland, Vince Gair. It was the first post-war major shopping centre to open in the Southern Hemisphere. The shopping complex cost £600,000 and was set on 28 acres (11.33ha). It was developed by Allan & Stark who promised a shopping experience that would be "both fun and a thrill".

More than 15,000 people visited the centre on the opening day and 20 police were on hand for crowd control. The opening had "all the trappings of a Hollywood premiere – prominent personalities, brass bands, popping flashbulbs ... and crowds".

Chermside Drive-In Shopping Centre featured an Allan & Stark department store, a Brisbane Cash & Carry (BCC) supermarket, 24 specialty stores including a florist, a milk and doughnut bar, a fruit and vegetable shop, a newsagent, a butcher's shop, a beauty salon, an optometrist, and a chemist. The centre also had its own children's nursery. There was parking for 650 cars. The terminus of tram route 72 to Enoggera via the Brisbane central business district was located opposite the centre.

BCC was taken over by Woolworths supermarket in 1958 resulting in that chain entering the Queensland grocery market. The Myer Emporium Group purchased Allan & Stark in 1959 and the Chermside store was rebranded to Myer and the shopping centre came under the ownership of Myer Emporium.

==== 1960s ====
The first major development occurred in 1965 at a cost of $2.5 million. This redevelopment added escalators, air-conditioning and a restaurant. In 1966 a $500,000 new Woolworths supermarket opened which was the largest store in Australia at that time.

In December 1968, the tram route 72 to Enoggera via the Brisbane CBD closed. It was replaced by a bus route 172 and eventually split into routes 370 Chermside to Brisbane CBD and 390 Brookside Shopping Centre to Brisbane CBD.

==== 1970s ====
In September 1972, a Target discount department store opened.

At around 7am on 19 December 1972, a major fire destroyed Woolworths and caused extensive damage to Myer and Clark Rubber and several specialty stores. The total damage bill was estimate to between $1.5 and $3 million at the time.

In June 1974, a four-year redevelopment plan was unveiled. It was known as the "New Project to Rise from the Ashes" and would cost around $16 million. The proposal was to expand Target, demolish and build a new three-level Myer store and add another 40 specialty shops. The retail area would expand to 33,445m² and the total number of parking space would be 2,500 and the existing bus terminal would be upgraded. The new Myer store opened in a new large three level building in June 1977. In 1979, the new Target discount department store opened.

==== 1980s ====
In 1985, the Myer Emporium Group merged with Coles to form the Coles-Myer Group resulting in the centre coming under the ownership of them. In that same year a five-stage refurbishment program was announced.

The refurbishment started in 1986 and in that same year an expansion added another 29 stores and an underground car park to the centre.

In May 1987, Chermside celebrated its 30th anniversary by attracting major personalities including international cricket star Ian Botham to the Centre Stage.

By October 1987, the first four stages of the $7 million redevelopment had been completed.

==== 1990s ====
In February 1992, a business mall opened. A third fire broke out in the centre in March 1993. The fire occurred in the plant room behind Target. This was followed by a severe thunderstorm in January 1994 which flooded the site and damaged 60% of the shopping centre.

In December 1996, the Westfield Group purchased Chermside from Coles Myer for $127 million and the centre was subsequently renamed to Westfield Chermside.

In 1999, work began on the $235 million major redevelopment of the centre which was to double its floor space. The redevelopment resulted in most of the existing structure being demolished except for the Myer store and some of the adjoining mall to make way for the larger complex. This redevelopment also resulted in the demolition of the old Chermside Police Station on the corner of Hamilton Road to be make way for the Chermside Bus Exchange and the nearby small row of shops to make way for the redevelopment. Stage one opened on 9 August 1999, which contained a Coles supermarket and a new bus station.

=== 21st century ===
==== 2000s ====
In 2000, the second stage of the redevelopment opened which included a new mall containing a Kmart discount department store, Bi-Lo Mega Fresh supermarket, Target, a 900-seat food court and 100 specialty stores. Westfield Chermside was the first Westfield in QLD to feature 'The Street' entertainment and lifestyle precinct with new 16 screen Birch Carroll & Coyle cinema complex which opened in late 2000. The opening of the new cinema complex resulted in customers moving away from the cinemas at Westfield Toombul.

In 2005, construction began on the first stage of the $150 million redevelopment. This development resulted in the expansion of the complex and includes a major discount department store, a supermarket, five mini majors, 100 speciality shops, additional 4000m² of commercial and mixed-use space and additional parking spaces.

The first stage of the $200 million redevelopment opened on 18 October 2006 which included an open-space market square area surrounded by an alfresco dining area, new Woolworths supermarket, Big W discount department store, JB Hi-Fi, 80 specialty stores and an additional 2,300 parking spaces. The floor area increased from 78,000m² to 110,000m². Before the end of 2006, Borders, Dan Murphy's and another 20 specialty stores have opened. On 4 August 2007, the two level David Jones store officially opened as part of that redevelopment.

In March 2008, the Bi-Lo supermarket closed down after eight years of trade. It was replaced by the first ever Harris Scarfe department store in Brisbane which opened 14 August 2008. On 14 November 2009, the Apple Store opened in the centre.

==== 2010s ====
In June 2011, Westfield Chermside announced a new 'Park Assist' system to help shoppers find available car parks quicker and a paid parking scheme designed to stop commuters parking vehicles at the centre. This paid parking scheme was introduced in late October and has sparked controversy amongst shoppers and locals.

In January 2015 work began on the $355 million redevelopment involving the construction of a two-level gallery mall which connects with the upper levels of Myer and David Jones department stores contain up to 95 new retailers including local and international mini-major stores. A new dining and entertainment precincts containing more than 12 large restaurant tenancies and 13 small-format street food stores linking the Event Cinemas complex.

Stage one of the redevelopment known as "The New Westfield Chermside" opened on 6 April 2017 and features a new two-level gallery mall featuring a two-level Zara store, a single level H&M and as well as Brisbane's first Sephora store, a newly relocated JB Hi-Fi and Rebel and an additional 50 specialty stores. This redevelopment has added an extra 33,000m² of floor space, 1300 extra parking spaces bring the total to 7300 and as well as ticketless parking.

Stage two of the redevelopment opened on 22 June 2017 and features a subtropical resort style landscape new dining, entertainment and lifestyle precinct containing water fountains with ex-ground palms, trees and shrubs and as well as a large-scale aluminium dome structure at the centre of the precinct is known as the ‘Urchin’. It's distinctive shape resembles the round, spiky edges of a sea urchin. More than 20 cafes and restaurants opened in the dining precinct. In addition, a new gymnasium and a child-minding centre were opened in the lifestyle precinct. In September 2017, Kingpin opened on level 2 and features a bowling alley, laser tag, arcade games, bars and karaoke. The opening of Uniqlo on 5 October 2017 concludes the $355 million redevelopment.

On 1 May 2019, Brisbane's first ever indoor sky diving centre iFLY opened its $15 million indoor sky diving facility in the newly built space outside the centre.

==== 2020s ====
In 2021, the 2000m² two-level Zara store closed and the ground level was replaced by Cotton On Mega whilst the upper level was split into two retail tenancies. In that same year H&M announced that it would be closing up to seven stores across Australia with Chermside being one of them. H&M closed in early 2022 and was replaced by Holey Moley which opened on 18 November 2022 and Hijinx Hotel which opened on 31 March 2023. The remaining space of H&M was split into three retail tenancies.

In July 2025, Scentre Group sold a quarter interest to Dexus Group. Dexus Group had purchased a 25% stake in Westfield Chermside for $683 million. The deal values Scentre Group's book value on 30 June 2025 and reflects a 5% capitalisation rate.

== Tenants ==
Westfield Chermside has 176,585m² of floor space. The major retailers include David Jones, Myer, Harris Scarfe, Big W, Kmart, Target, Coles, Woolworths, Dan Murphy's, Cotton On, Uniqlo, Anaconda, Apple Store, JB Hi-Fi, Rebel, iFLY, Hijinx Hotel, Holey Moley, Kingpin and Event Cinemas.

== Gallery ==
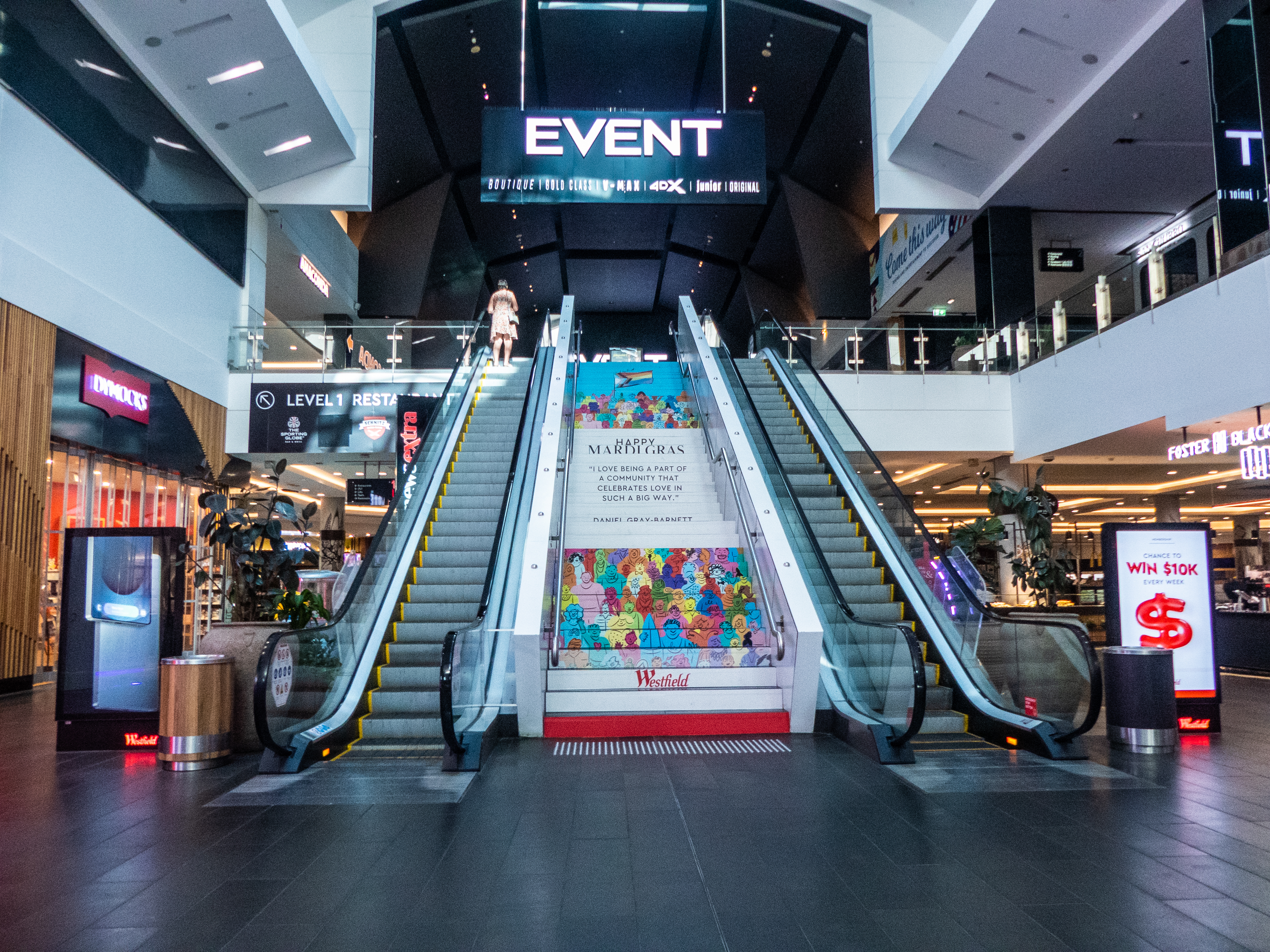
View of Event Cinemas in the South Atrium

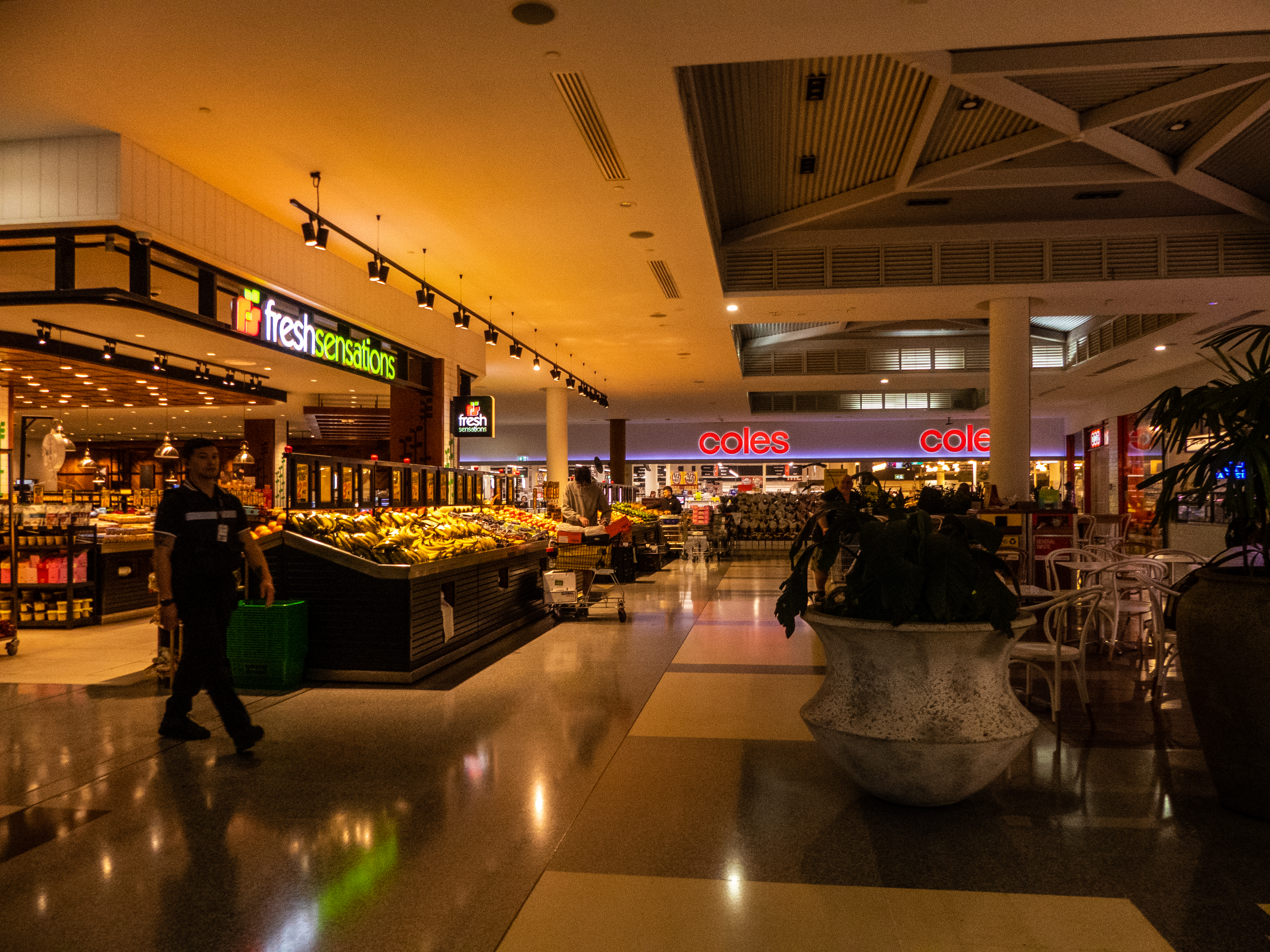
View of Coles and Fresh Sensations

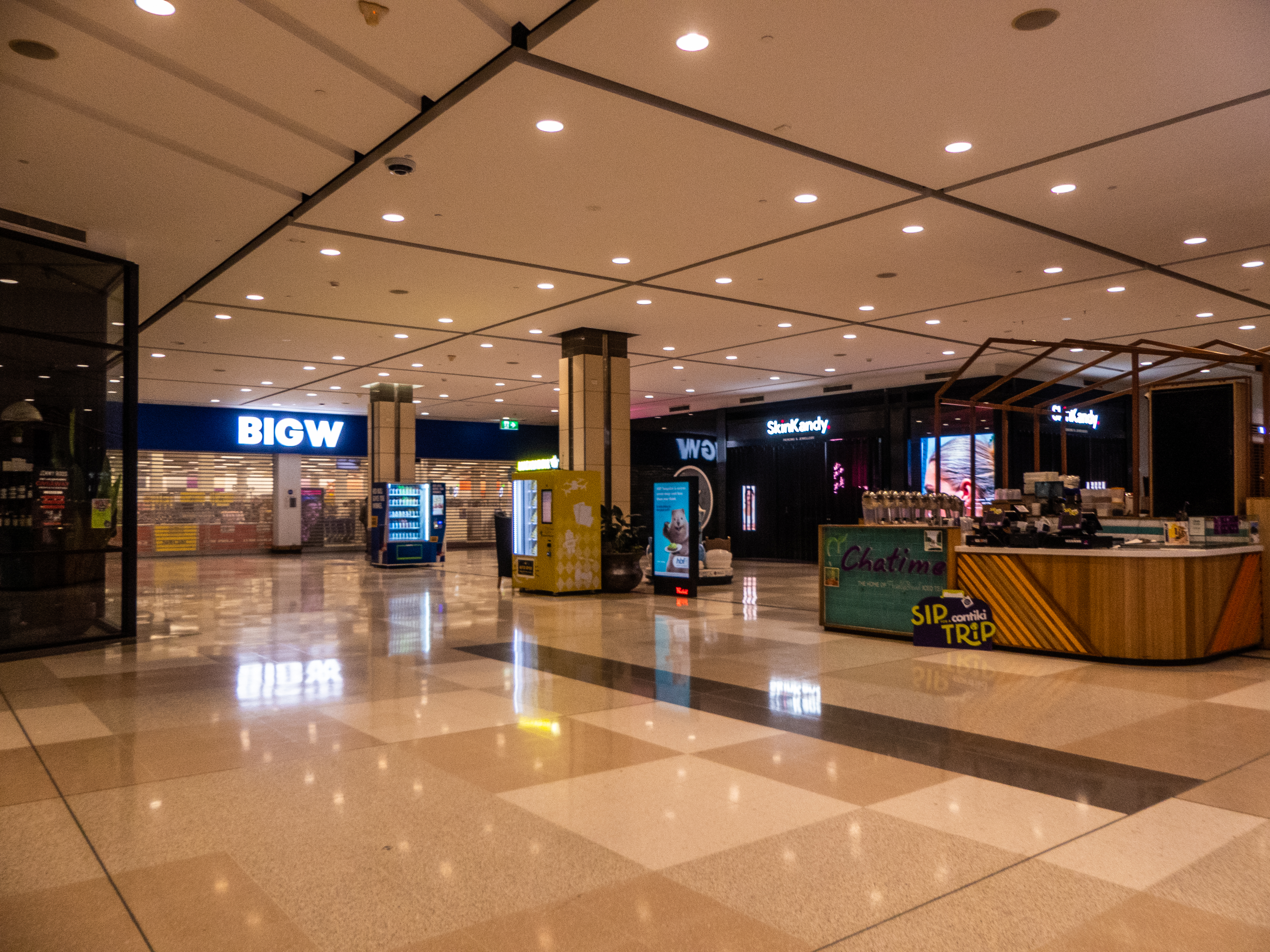
View of Big W

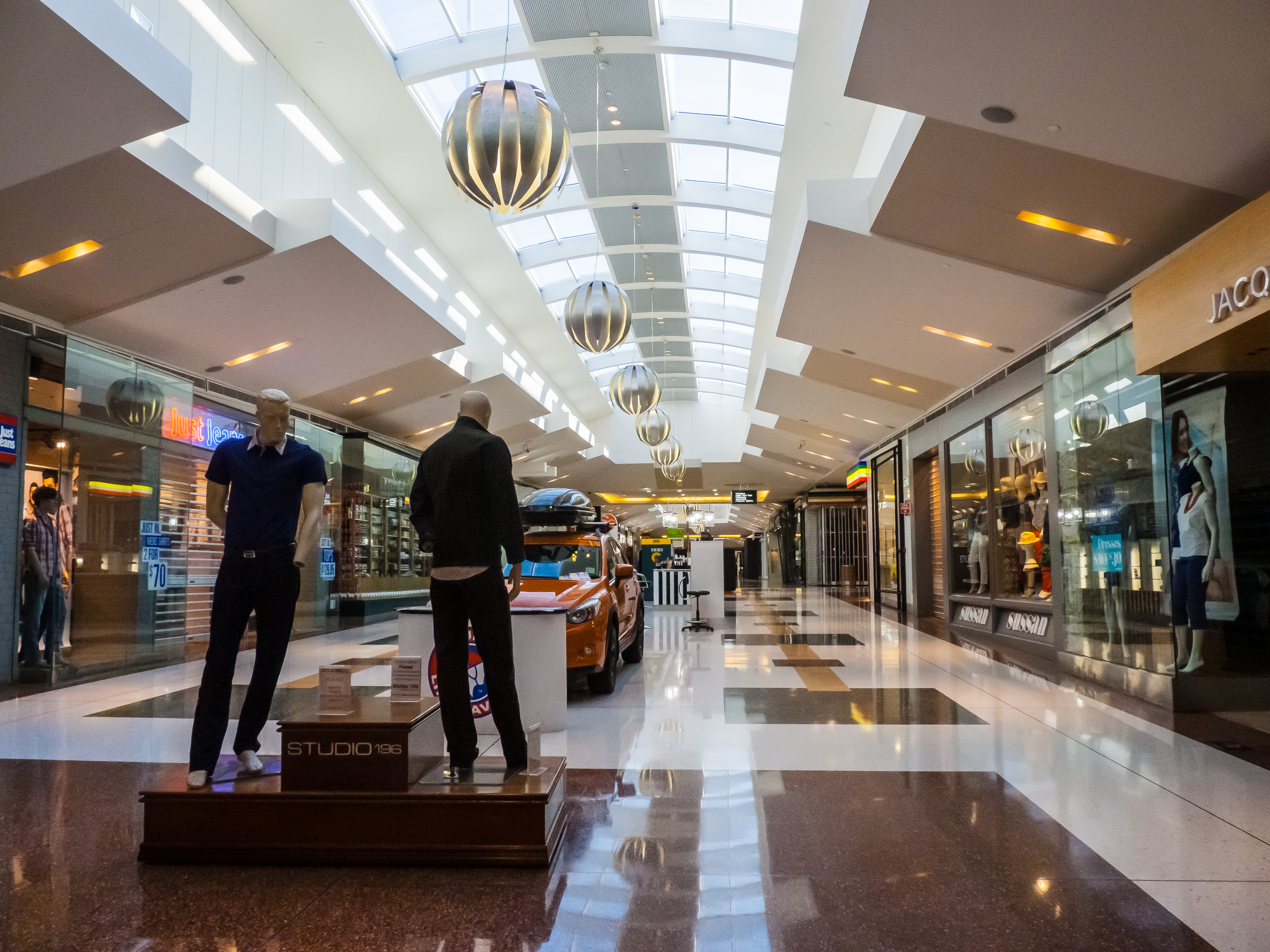
Fashion stores in the Western Mall near Myer

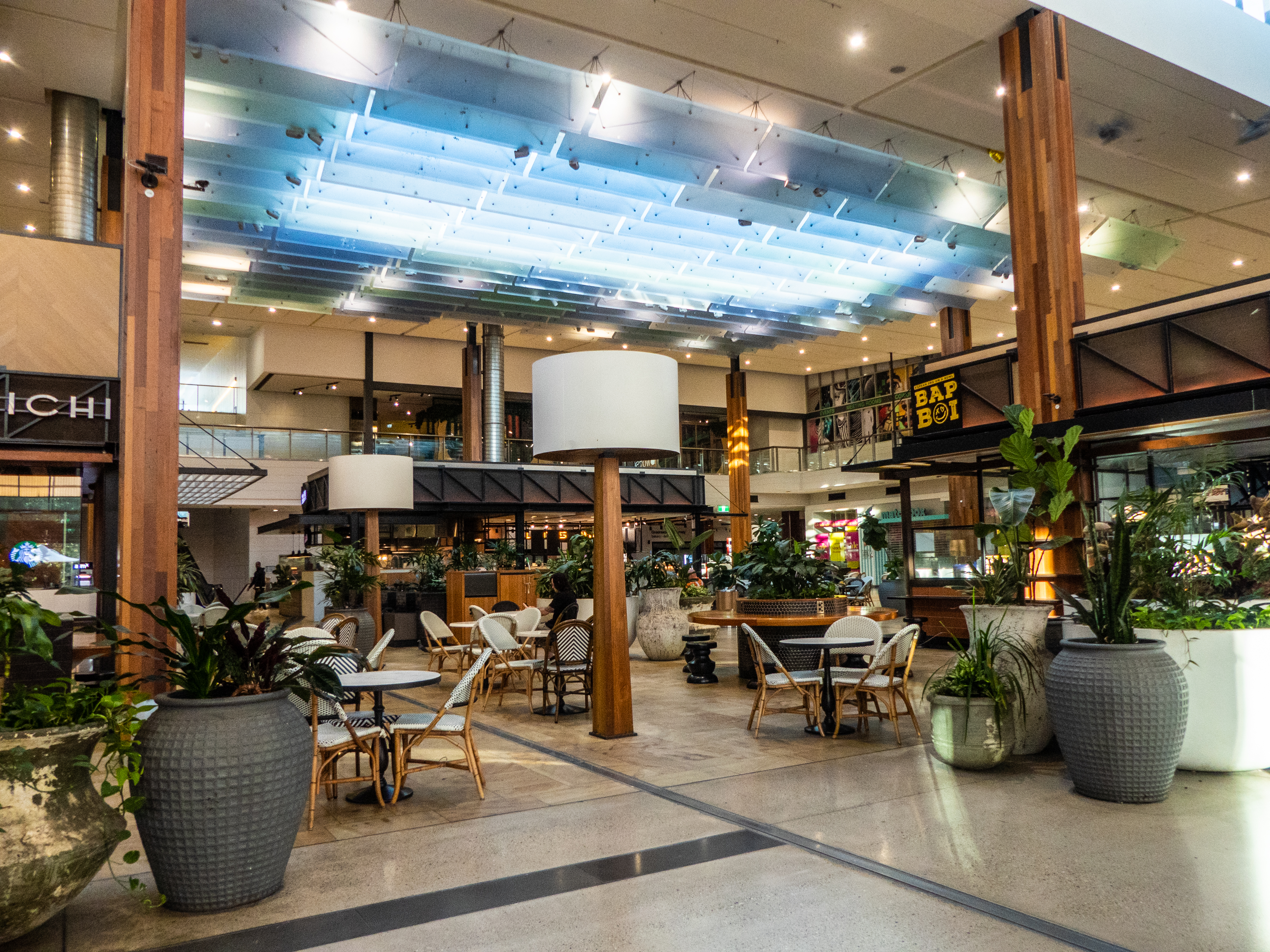
North Atrium food court

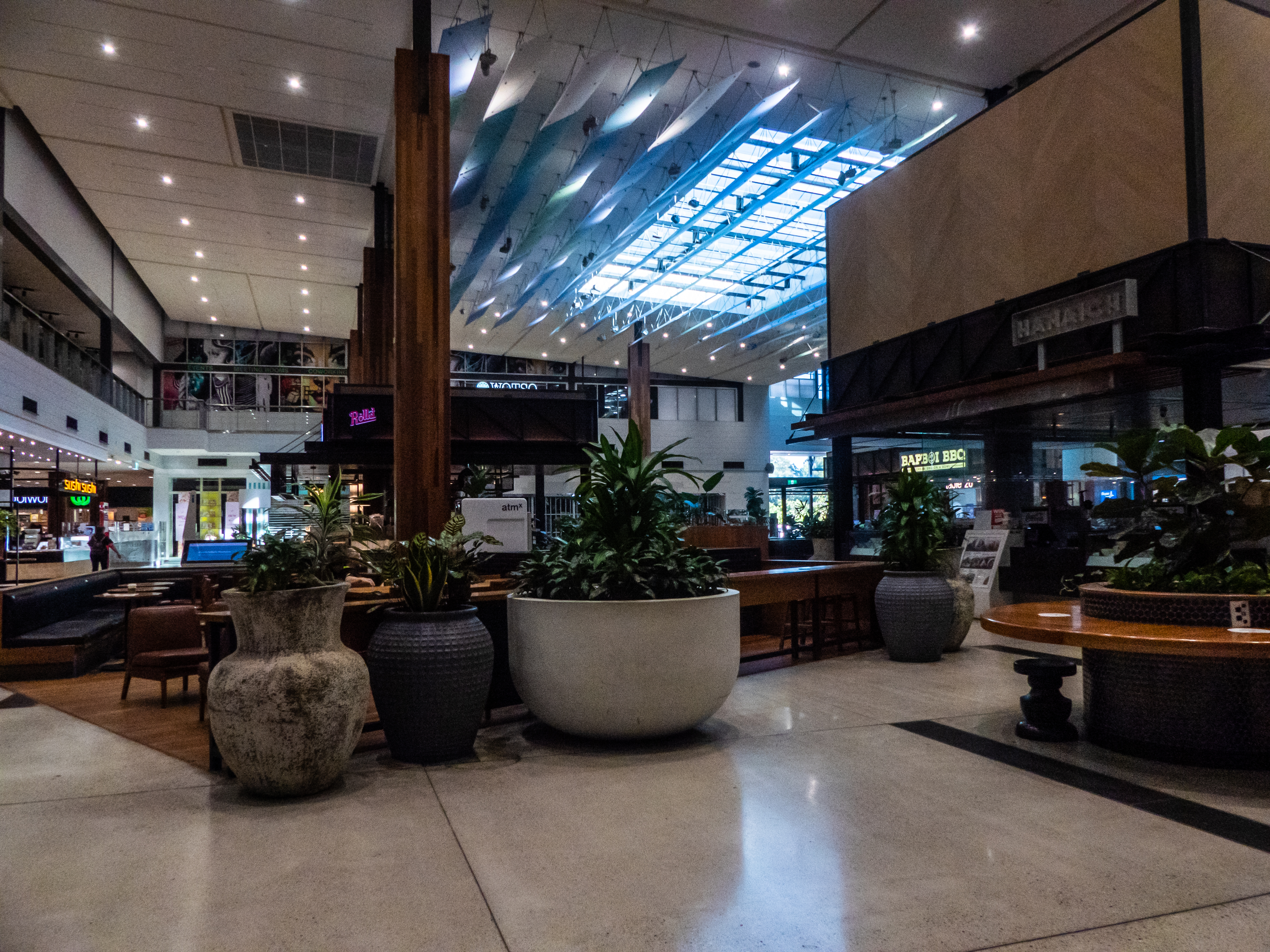
North Atrium food court with Woolworths in the background

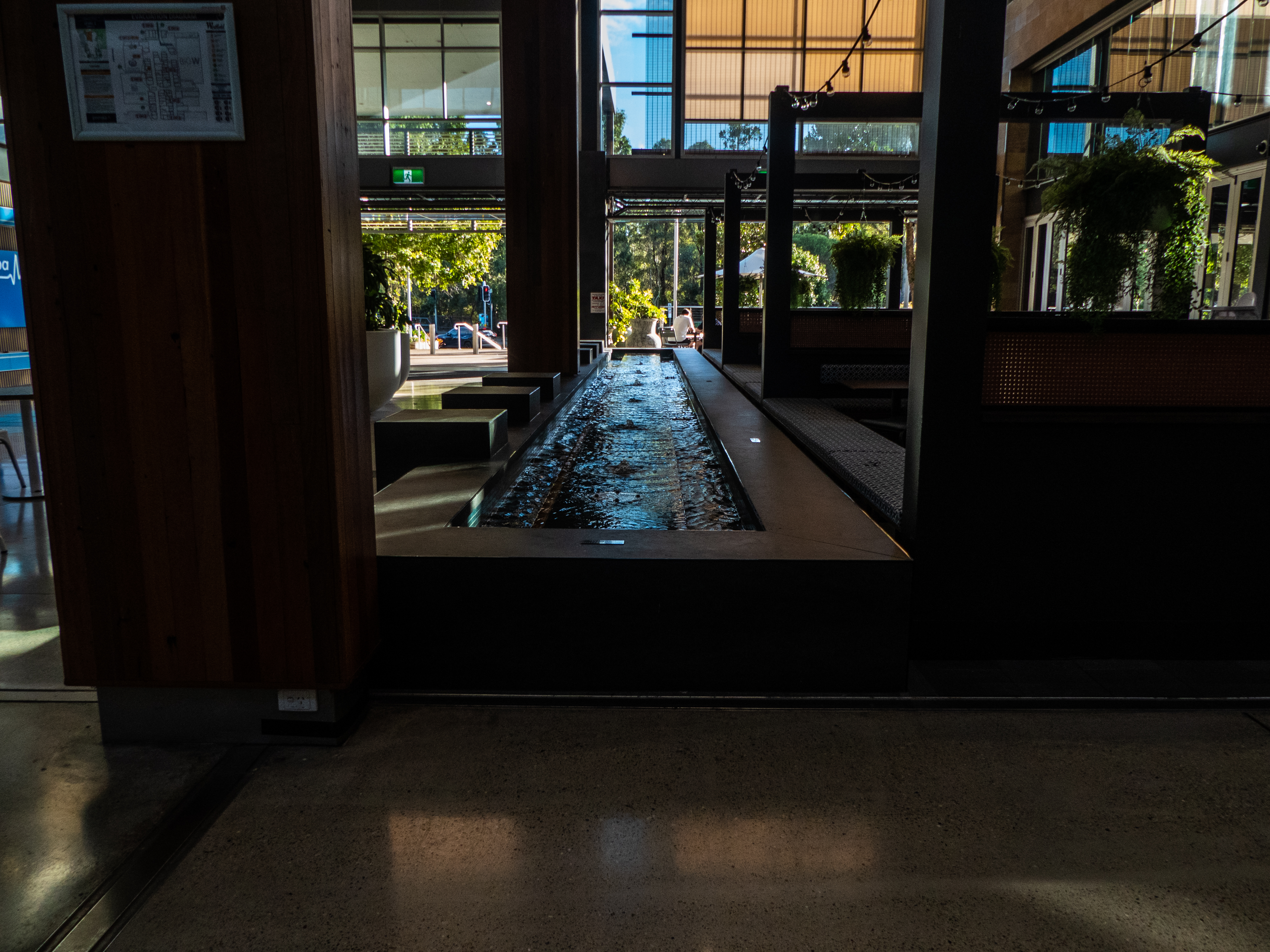
North Atrium water feature

== See also ==
- List of shopping centres in Australia
