= Westfield Penrith =

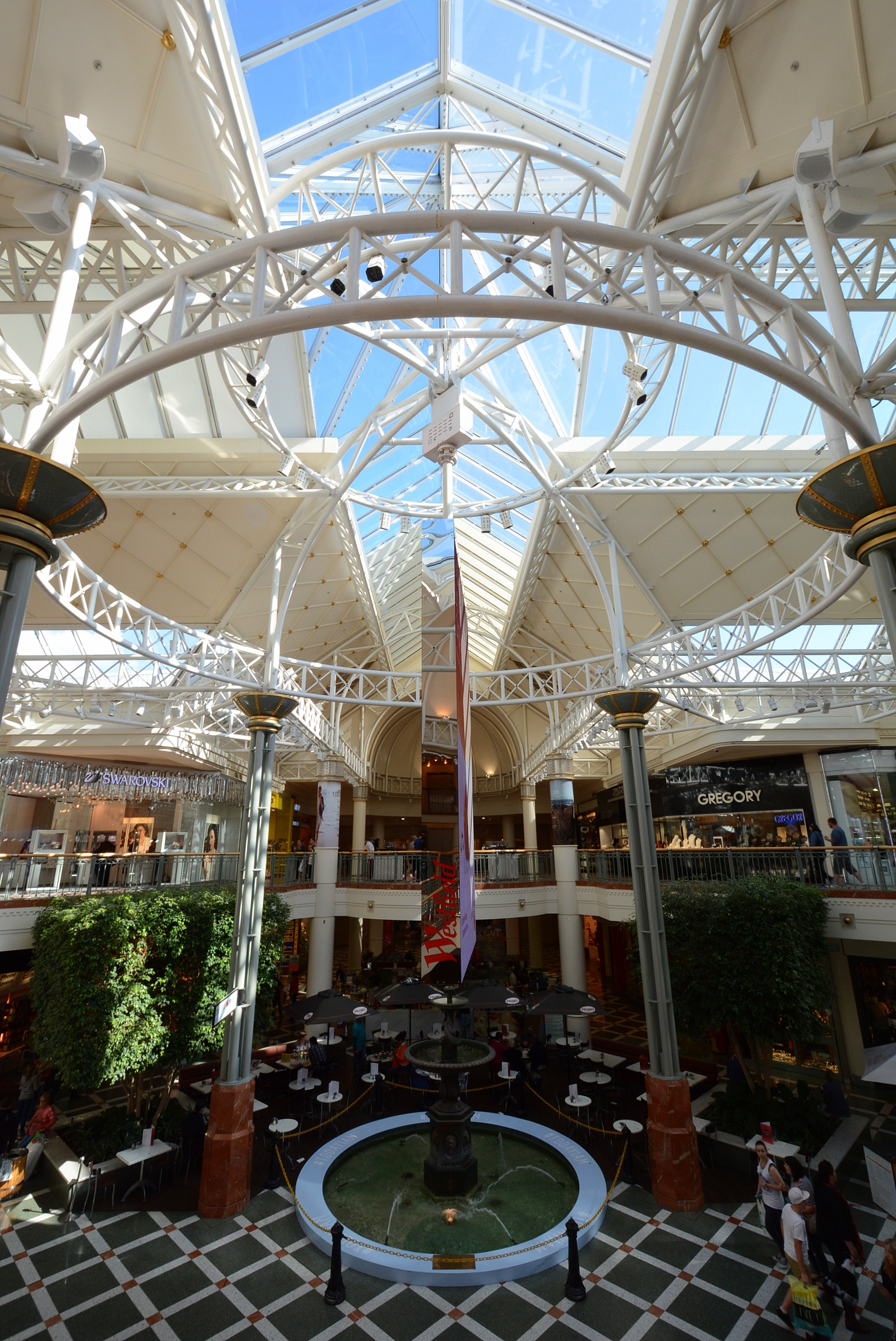
- Location: Penrith, New South Wales, Australia
- Coordinates: 33°45′05″S 150°41′29″E
- Address: 585 High Street
- Opened: 31 March 1971
- Developer: Liam McWilliams
- Manager: Scentre Group
- Owner: GPT (1971-2005); GPT (50%), Westfield (50%) (2005-)
- Num. of stores: 67
- Floor area: 91,409 m^{2} (983,918 sq ft)
- Public transit: Penrith railway station
- Website: www.westfield.com.au

Westfield Penrith, formerly Penrith Plaza, is a shopping centre in Penrith, New South Wales, Australia.

== History ==
The shopping centre opened as Penrith Plaza on 31 March 1971 with Myer as lead tenant and was sold to the General Property Trust (GPT) in April 1971. By 1993, the ANZ Bank had a shareholding.

In early 2005, GPT reached agreement with the Westfield Group to sell 50% of Penrith Plaza after which it became known as Westfield Penrith.

In 2005, the centre underwent a $140 million expansion which added 16,000 square metres (170,000 sq ft) including 105 retailers and left the centre with 83,000 square metres (890,000 sq ft) of space.

In November and December 2022, Westfield Penrith debuted a $33 million update including a Coles supermarket and a Holey Moley indoor golf course.

== Tenants ==
Westfield Penrith has 91,409 m² of floor space. The major retailers include Aldi, Apple Store, Archie Brothers Cirque Electriq, Best & Less, Big W, Coles, Cotton On, Hoyts, JB Hi-Fi, Myer, Rebel and Woolworths.
