= Westfield Carindale =

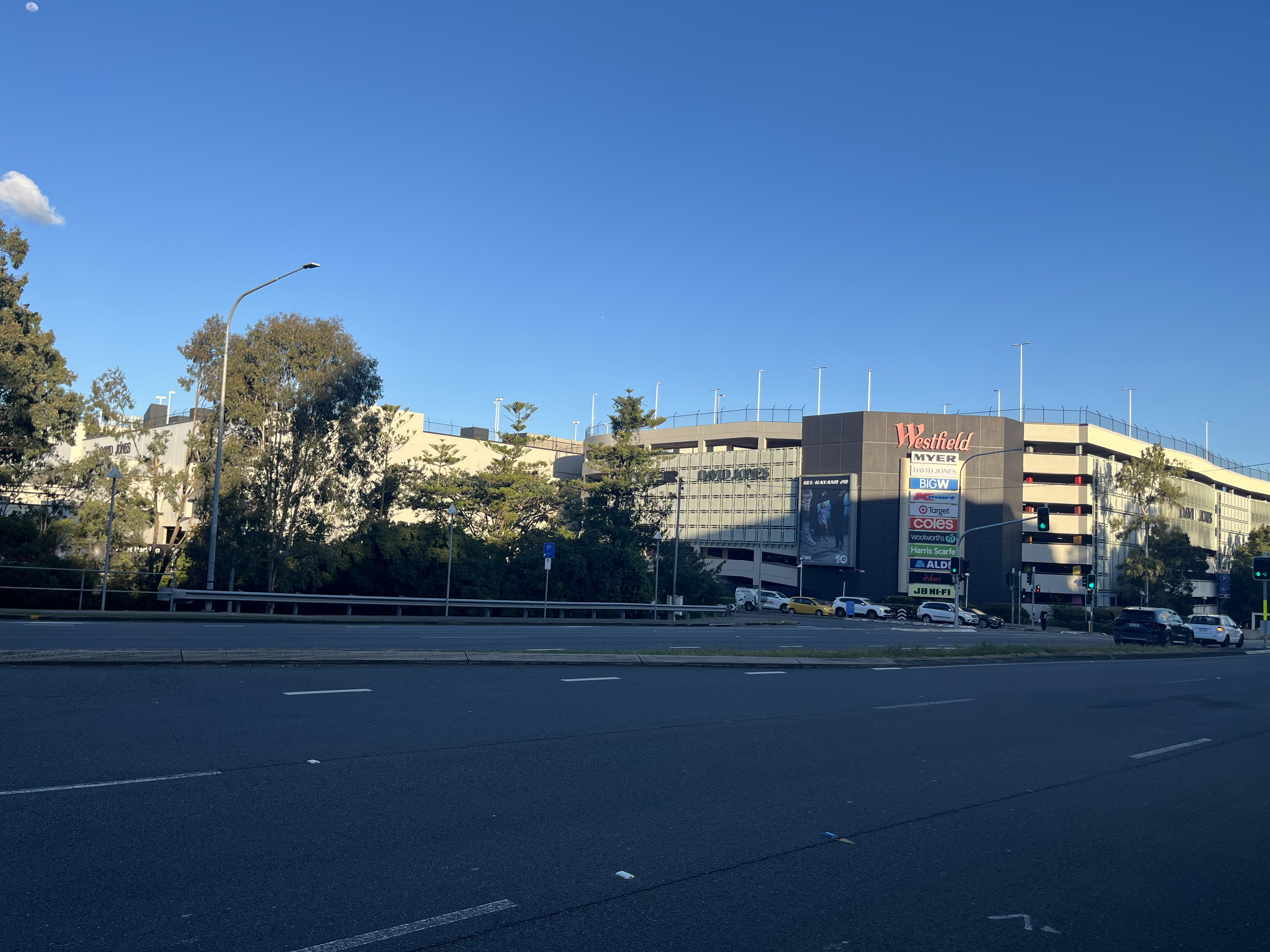
- Westfield Carindale from Creek Road in 2026
- Location: Carindale, Brisbane Australia
- Coordinates: 27°30′10″S 153°06′05″E
- Address: 1151 Creek Road
- Opened: 14 November 1979; 46 years ago
- Manager: Scentre Group
- Owner: Carindale Property Trust (Scentre Group); Australian Prime Property Fund (Lendlease)
- Num. of stores: 450
- Num. of anchor tenants: 12
- Floor area: 136,373 square metres
- Floors: 3 (Event Cinemas and Go Health Club on level three)
- Parking: 6,750 spaces
- Website: www.westfield.com.au

Westfield Carindale is a large Australian shopping centre in the Brisbane suburb of Carindale. The centre is one of the largest shopping centres in Australia. The centre contains over 450 specialty stores and almost 6,000 car parking spaces. Other features include a food court, a Brisbane City Council library, and a state of the art luxury Glasshouse Dining Precinct.

== History ==
First opened in 1979, it was Brisbane's largest shopping centre (at 116,884 square metres or 1,258,139 sq ft). It originally had only 50 specialty stores and is built on the same site as Belmont House. In 1996, Suncorp floated the property as the Suncorp Property Trust.

In March 1999, Westfield Carindale became the first centre in Queensland to have two major department stores in the one centre, Myer and David Jones.

It was managed for twenty years by Jones Lang LaSalle until October 1999 when the Westfield Group launched a bid for Suncorp's 50% of the trust. The Westfield bid was successful and the trust was renamed Carindale Property Trust in addition to a re-branding of the centre. Suncorp sold its remaining 50% as part of the sale of Suncorp Retail Property Fund to Lendlease's Australian Prime Property Fund in 2001.

In October 2010, Westfield Carindale commenced a $300 million redevelopment which added approximately 22,000 square metres of retail to the centre. Stage one of the project opened on 29 March 2012 and featured over 75 new retail tenancies in a new 2 level parallel mall, a full-line Coles supermarket and a larger relocated Target discount department store.

Stage Two of the development opened on 9 August 2012 and included a strong focus on Australian and international fashion brands. New precincts introduced brands such as Adidas, Aesop, Kookai, Leona Edmiston, Marcs, Mecca Maxima, Saba and Scotch & Soda. Other features of the redevelopment included a new Brisbane City Council Library, new Event Cinemas complex, new dining precinct The Glasshouse and an improved car park management system which includes parking guidance assistance.

In December 2013, Westfield Carindale opened its first indoor children's play centre, We Play, located on level 3 near the then-Go Health gym, supervising children for a two hours.

In 2019, David Jones downsized to a single-level, ground floor store with the department store's upper floor space occupied by a new Kmart store that opened in 2020.

== Transport ==
Carindale bus station is a major transport hub for the area, providing access to three major universities, the Redland Shire and the Brisbane central business district. The proposed future Carindale busway station as part of the Eastern Busway will provide extra and more efficient public transport.

== Amenities ==
The Brisbane City Council operate a public library in Westfield Carindale.
