= Holey Moley (restaurant chain) =

Australian entertainment bar chain

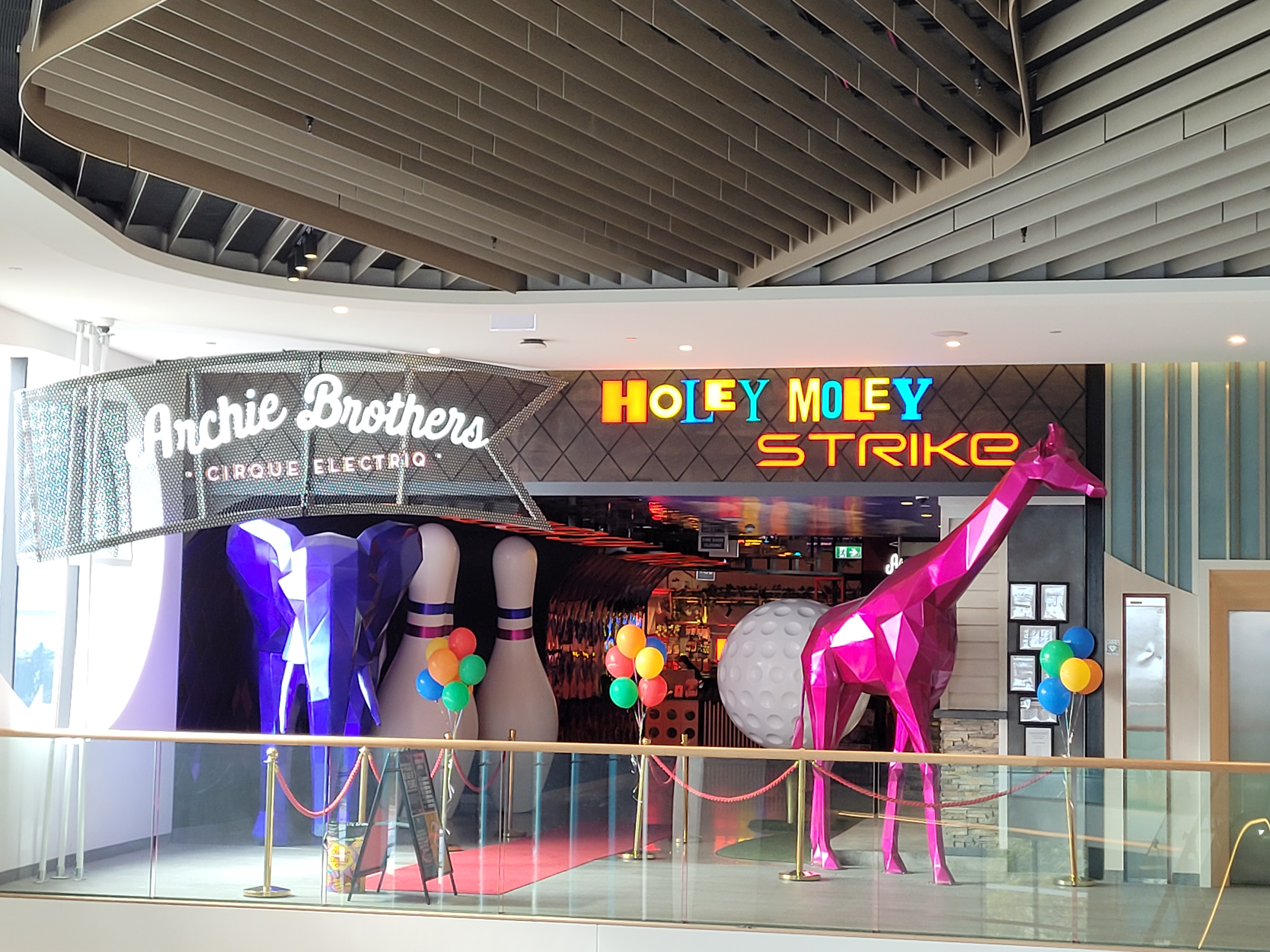
- Karrinyup Shopping Centre location
- Industry: Entertainment bar
- Headquarters: Australia
- Area served: Australia, New Zealand, Singapore
- Services: Miniature golf, bar
- Parent: Funlab
- Website: www.holeymoley.com.au

Holey Moley is an entertainment bar chain owned by Australian entertainment company Funlab. Each location includes miniature golf courses featuring pop culture themes from television shows and classic films. As of 2019 it operates more than 15 locations in Australia, Singapore, and New Zealand.

== History ==
Holey Moley was launched in 2016 by Michael B.Beans. It began in Fortitude Valley, Queensland and expanded into cities such as Adelaide, Melbourne, Perth and East Kilbride. Its first location outside of Australia was in Auckland, New Zealand, which opened in October 2018. It expanded to Singapore in December 2018, opening up a location in Clarke Quay.
