= Westfield Liverpool =

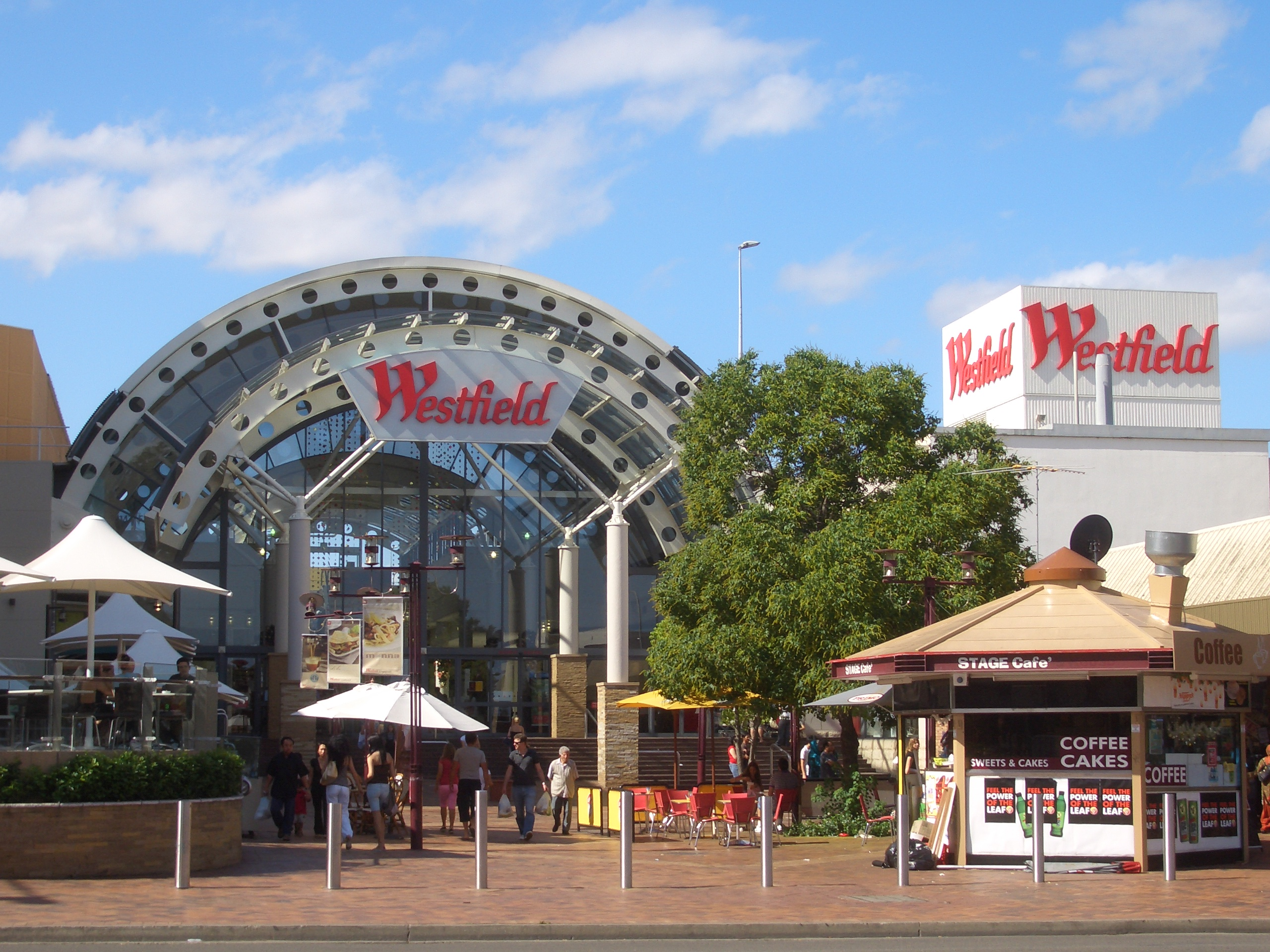
- Location: Liverpool, Sydney
- Coordinates: 33°55′11″S 150°55′28″E
- Opened: 1971; 55 years ago
- Manager: Scentre Group
- Owner: Scentre Group (50%); AMP (50%)
- Num. of stores: 340
- Num. of anchor tenants: 6
- Floor area: 83,365 m^{2} (897,333 sq ft)
- Floors: 3 (Top is Event Cinemas)
- Parking: 3,558 Bays
- Public transit: Liverpool
- Website: westfield.com.au

Westfield Liverpool is a major shopping centre, located in Liverpool, a suburb of Sydney.

== History and development ==
Westfield Liverpool was opened in 1971.

The current anchors of the centre are Myer, Kmart (formerly Target prior to 2021), Big W, Woolworths, Coles, Uniqlo, JB Hi-Fi, Toys 'R' Us and an Event Cinemas complex.

The centre has a current trade area population of 614,000 people, with 14.9 million annual customer visits. The total annual retail sales at the centre were A$515.5 million.

=== Redevelopments ===
The centre has been extended and redeveloped three times in its life, the first in 1991, again in 1993, and more recently in 2006. By its 1993 extension, the centre was jointly owned by Westfield and Rodamco, and had 57,664 m^{2} (620,690 sq ft) of GLA. The 2006 extensions brought the GLA to 83,365 m^{2} (897,333 sq ft). These extensions were valued at an estimated $200 million (2006). In 2011, another redevelopment occurred in the shopping centre which included widening of the mall, new flooring, lighting and furniture, as well as the relocation of existing retailers.

== Transport ==
The centre can be accessed by multiple transport options, including public bus, and is within walking distance of Liverpool railway station.

== Image gallery ==
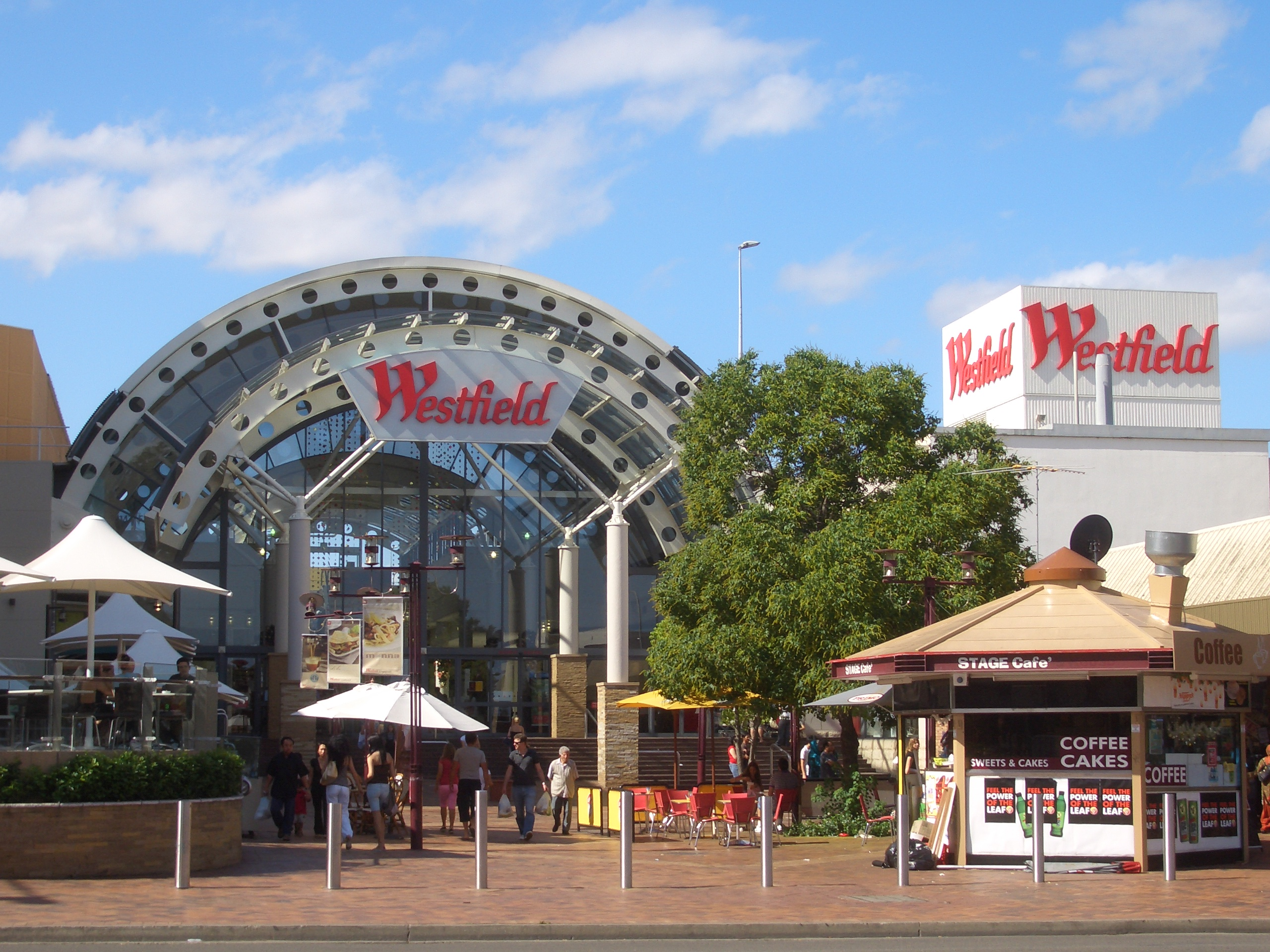
Entrance opposite Macquarie Street Mall

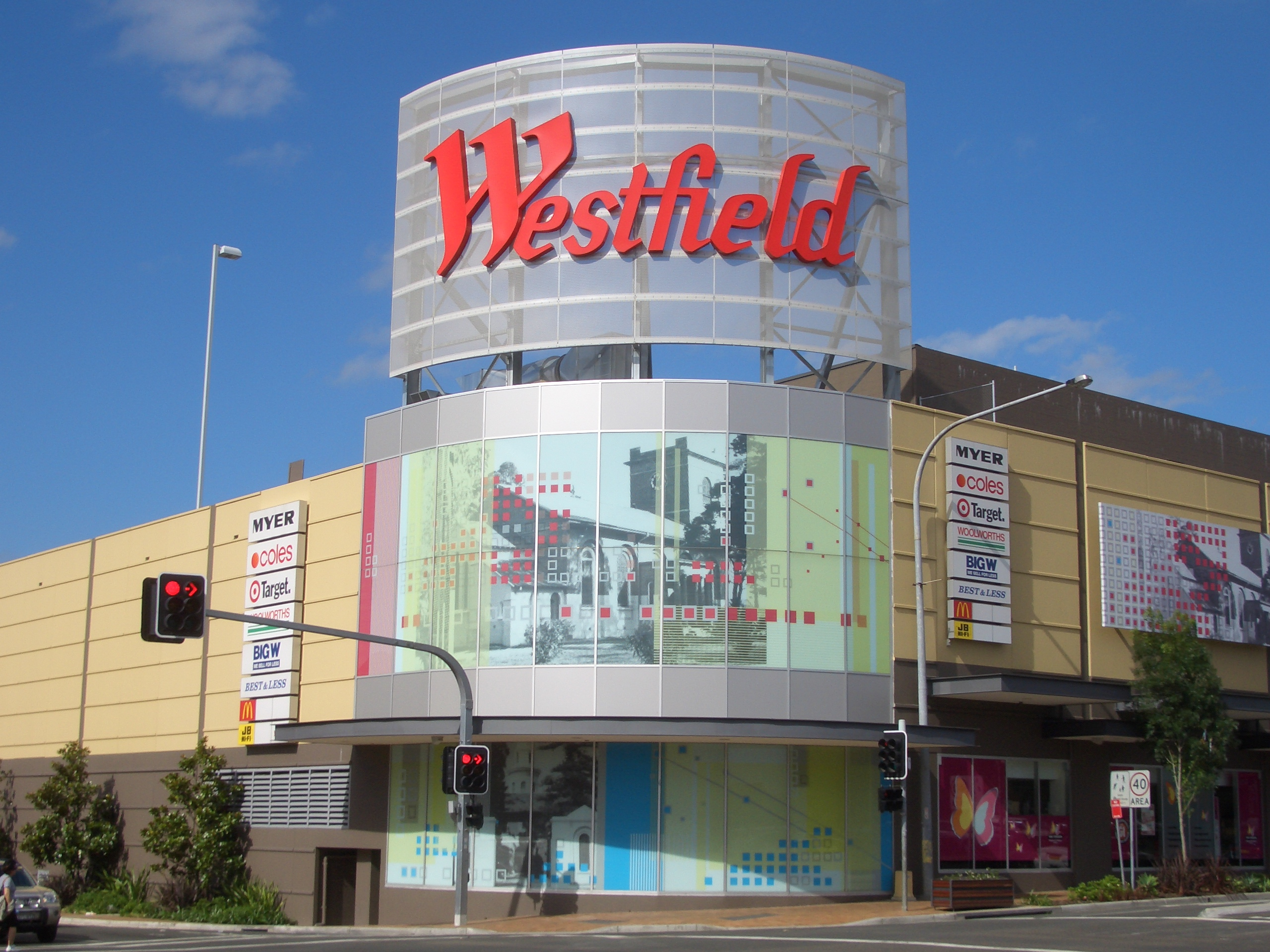
View from west

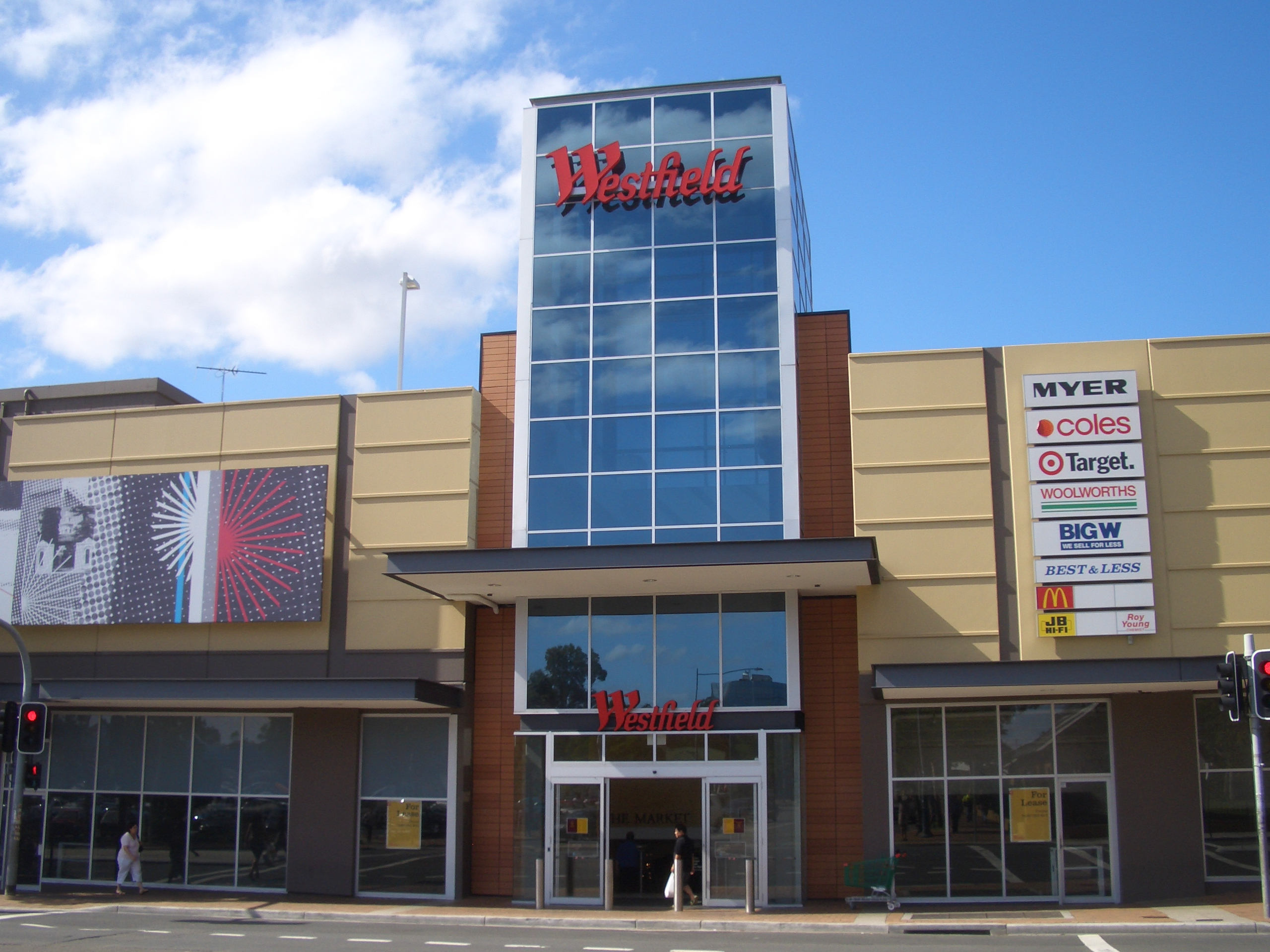
Elizabeth Street entrance
