= Queensland Investment Corporation =

Investment company of the state of Queensland, Australia

- Type: Government owned corporation
- Industry: Investment management
- Founded: 1 June 1991; 35 years ago
- Headquarters: Brisbane, Australia
- Number of locations: 8 offices: Brisbane (HQ), Sydney, Melbourne, London, Copenhagen, New York, San Francisco, Singapore
- Area served: Worldwide
- Key people: Andrew King (Chairman); Kylie Rampa (CEO); Claire Blake (CFOO)
- Products: Infrastructure; Real estate; Private debt; Private equity; Fixed income; Multi-asset overlay
- AUM: A$130bn (June 2025)
- Owner: Queensland Government
- Number of employees: 900+ (as at 2025)
- Website: www.qic.com.au

The Queensland Investment Corporation (QIC) is an Australian institutional investment manager and sovereign investor.

QIC invests across infrastructure, real estate, private equity, private debt, fixed income and multi-asset overlay solutions. It manages funds on behalf of clients in Australia, North America, the United Kingdom, Europe, Asia, and the Middle East, including pension and superannuation funds, sovereign wealth funds, insurers, universities and other government institutions.

Although wholly owned by the Queensland Government, QIC operates commercially and invests alongside global institutional partners. As of June 2025, it manages more than A$130 billion in assets under management.

== Governance ==
QIC is constituted under the Queensland Investment Corporation Act 1991 and operates as a company Government-Owned Corporation (GOC). Its Board of Directors, accountable to shareholding Ministers, including the Queensland Treasurer, oversees strategy, risk management and investment performance.

== History ==
QIC was established on 1 July 1991 by the Queensland Government under the Queensland Investment Corporation Act 1991 to manage the State’s long-term investments. Its early activities focused on liquid markets (fixed income, currency, cash) and real estate.

Year	Detail
2002	Began managing funds for clients outside the Queensland Government.
2004–2006	Opened offices in Sydney, Melbourne, and London; established private equity and infrastructure investment capabilities.
2008	QIC transitioned from a statutory Government Owned Corporation to a company GOC (QIC Limited) to enhance commercial independence while remaining wholly owned by the Queensland Government. Became a signatory to the United Nations-supported Principles for Responsible Investment (UN PRI).
2011–2014	Opened international offices in San Francisco and New York.
2021	Launched Private Debt capability. Kylie Rampa appointed Chief Executive Officer, succeeding Damien Frawley.
2023	Opened an office in Singapore in 2023.
2025	Andrew King appointed Chairman of the Board.
2026	Opened an office in Copenhagen in 2026.

== Offices ==
QIC has offices in Brisbane (headquarters), Sydney, Melbourne, London, Copenhagen, New York, San Francisco and Singapore.
