= MidCity =

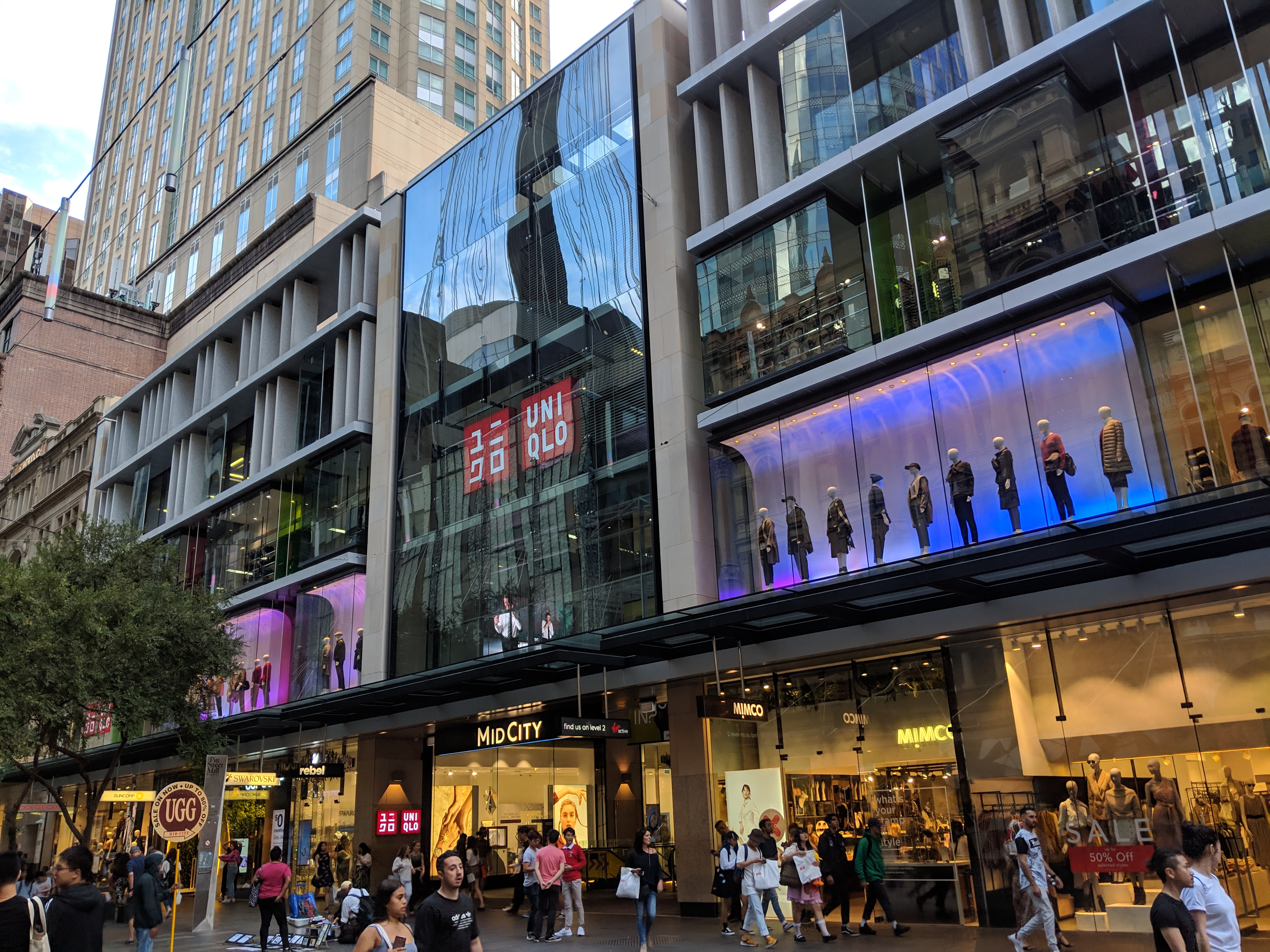
- Entrance to MidCity from Pitt Street Mall
- Location: Sydney, New South Wales, Australia
- Coordinates: 33°52′11″S 151°12′27″E
- Address: 197 Pitt Street Mall
- Opened: 1989; 37 years ago (original); 23 March 2010; 16 years ago (stage 1); June 2010; 16 years ago (stage 2)
- Manager: Lendlease
- Owner: Lendlease
- Num. of stores: 24
- Num. of anchor tenants: 1
- Floor area: 9,427 m^{2} (101,471 sq ft)
- Floors: 4
- Website: midcityshopping.com.au

MidCity is a shopping centre in the Sydney central business district. It is located on Pitt Street Mall, adjacent to Westfield Sydney, The Strand Arcade and is diagonally opposite Glasshouse. MidCity has over 24 stores across Fashion, Beauty, Fitness and Lifestyle.

== Transport ==
MidCity is just a short walk from Town Hall and St James railway stations.

The CBD and South East Light Rail at QVB offer frequent services to MidCity.

MidCity has bus connections to Eastern Suburbs and Inner West, as well as local surrounding suburbs operated by Transit Systems and Transdev John Holland. The majority of its bus services are located Pitt and Elizabeth Streets.

MidCity does not offer parking for customers. However the Glasshouse and Westfield Sydney car park offer valet parking with 172 spaces.

== History ==
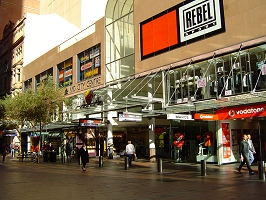
The old Mid City Centre

The original Mid City Centre opened in 1989 and featured around 50 specialty stores over three levels. These stores included Rebel Sport, HMV, Dick Smith and Priceline.

The main entrance to Mid City Centre was on the Pitt Street Mall and this provided access to other centres on the pedestrian mall including Westfield Sydney, Imperial Arcade, Skygarden, Glasshouse, Sydney Central Plaza and the Strand Arcade.

In May 2006 Fortius Funds Management purchased the centre for $270 million and Lendlease acquired 25% stake in the centre.

In November 2007, Mid City Centre was demolished to make way for an office and retail development.

The old Mid City Centre site has been rebuilt at a cost of approximately A$70 million with an office tower known as 420 George and a new shopping centre known as MidCity. Stage one of the new Mid City Centre opened on 23 March 2010 and it became home to stores such as 2 storey flagships by General Pants Co. and Witchery as well as G-Star Raw, and a range of other Australian retailers. Stage two opened on 17 June 2010 by American fashion designer and actress Nicole Richie in a ribbon cutting ceremony. Stage two included the opening of Rebel Sport flagship store and brought the total stores to 45. It also re-established a pedestrian link between George Street and the Pitt Street Mall (two of Sydney's shopping streets).

On 27 November 2014 Japanese retailer Uniqlo opened its second Sydney store in the centre on level one.

== Tenants ==
MidCity has 9,427m² of floor space. The major retailers include Uniqlo and Rebel. Other retailers include Sheike, Forever New, Kathmandu, Cotton On Body, Culture Kings, Leah’s Wax Works and Peter Alexander.
