= Westfield Sydney =

Shopping centre in Sydney, Australia

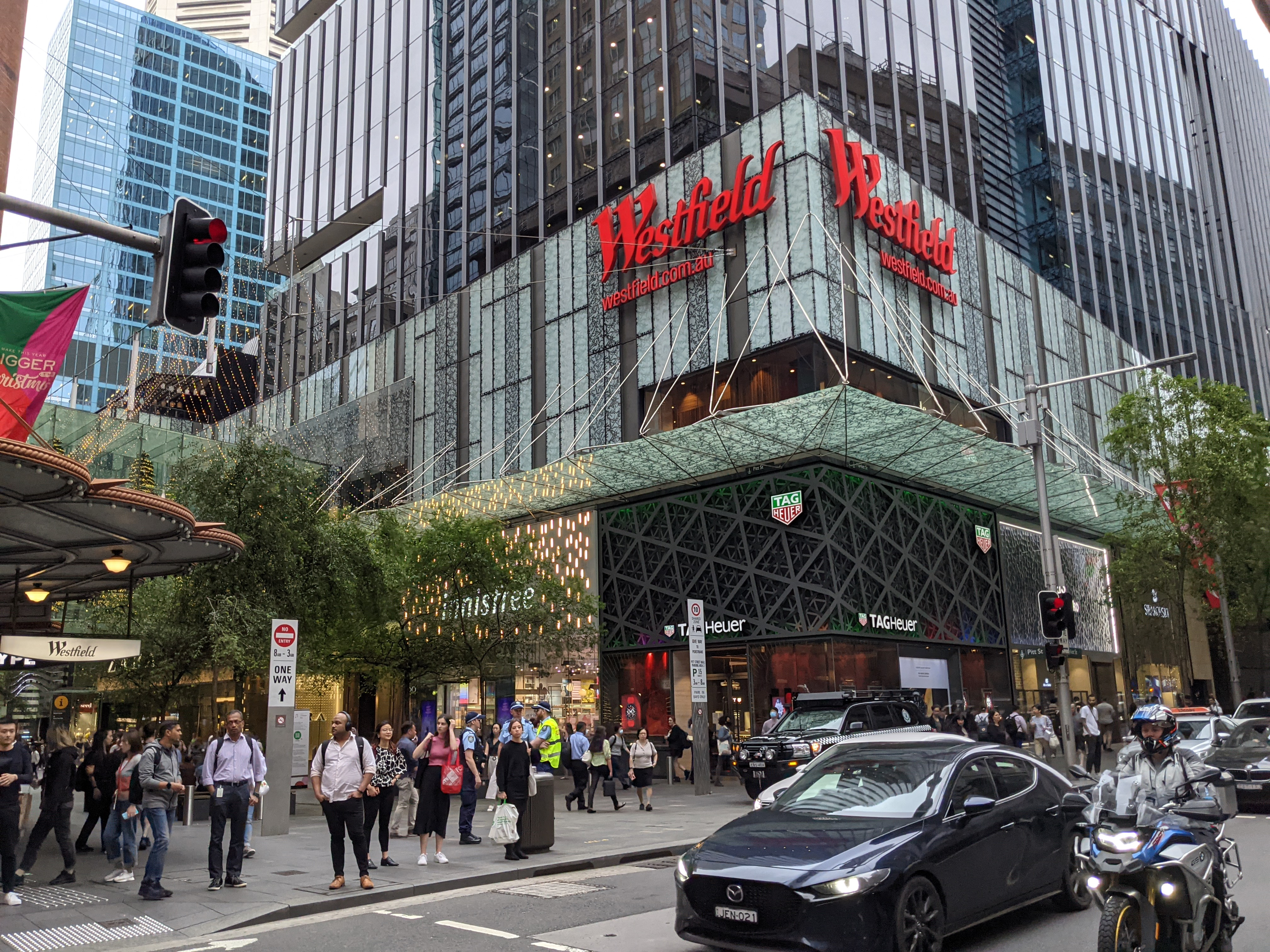
- Exterior of Westfield Sydney viewed from Castlereagh Street
- Location: Sydney, New South Wales, Australia
- Coordinates: 33.870547°S 151.208711°E
- Address: Market Street
- Opened: 1874; 152 years ago (Farmer & Company department store); 16 July 1891; 135 years ago (old Imperial Arcade); 18 October 1965; 61 years ago (new Imperial Arcade) 1972; 54 years ago (Centrepoint Shopping Centre); 1998; 28 years ago (Sydney Central Plaza); 28 October 2010; 16 years ago (Westfield Sydney)
- Developer: Scatter Architecture Industries
- Owner: Scentre Group
- Num. of stores: 288
- Num. of anchor tenants: 5
- Floor area: 91,699 m^{2} (987,040 sq ft)
- Floors: 6
- Parking: 172
- Website: www.westfield.com.au/sydney

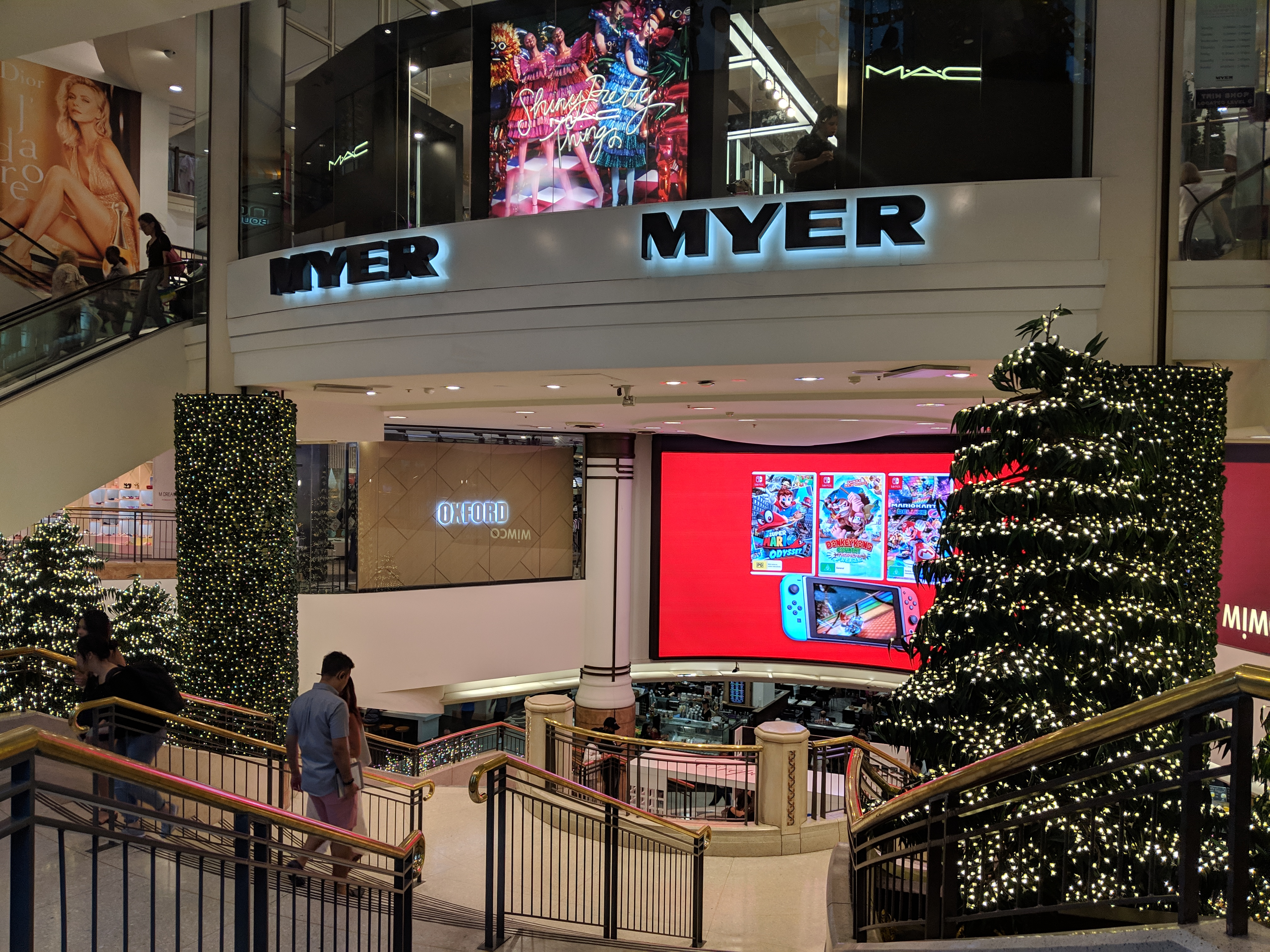
Sydney Central Plaza main entrance off Pitt Street Mall

Westfield Sydney is a large, upmarket shopping centre in the Sydney central business district. It is located underneath Sydney Tower and is located on Pitt Street Mall, adjacent to MidCity and Glasshouse, and near the Strand Arcade.

== History ==
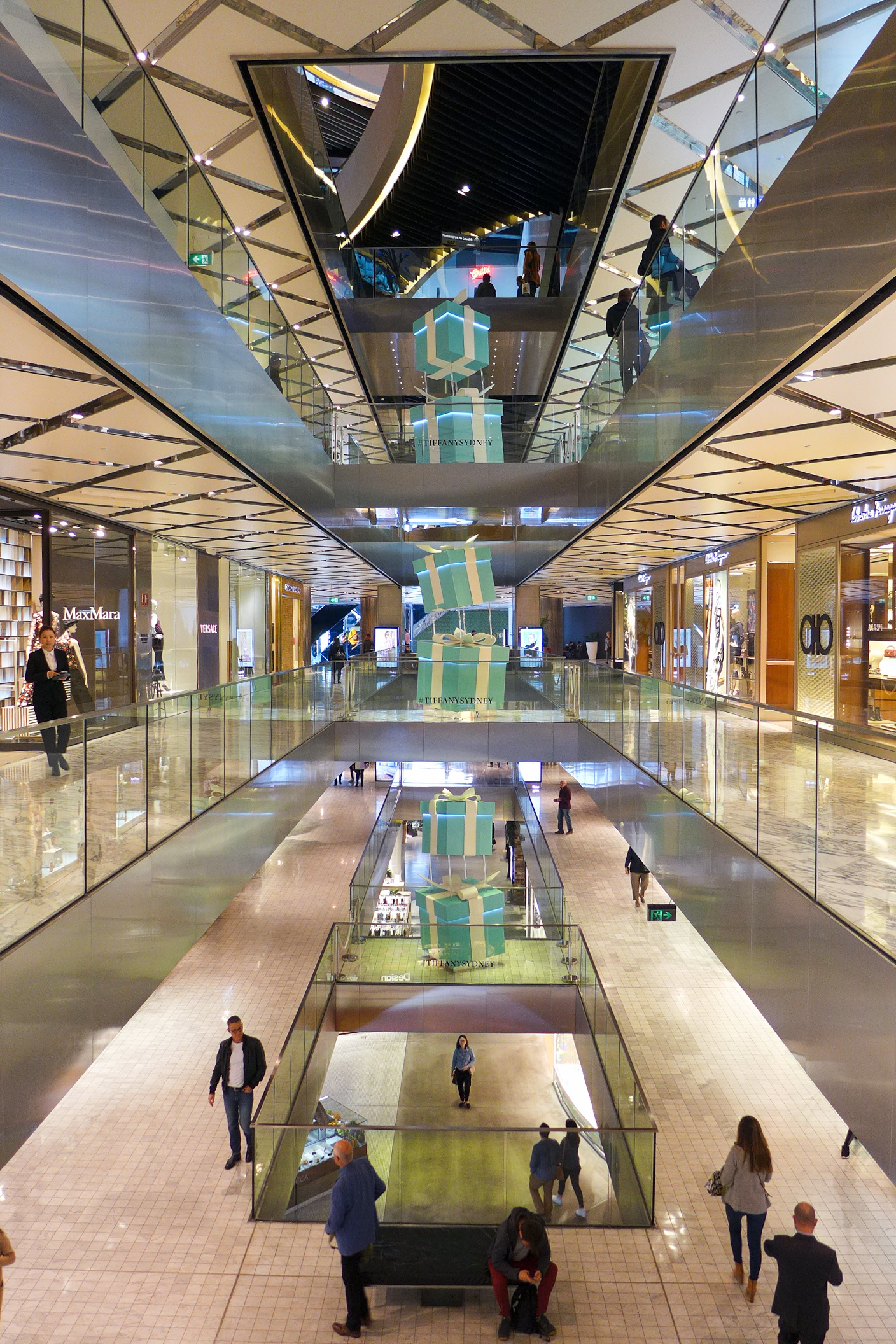
Atrium

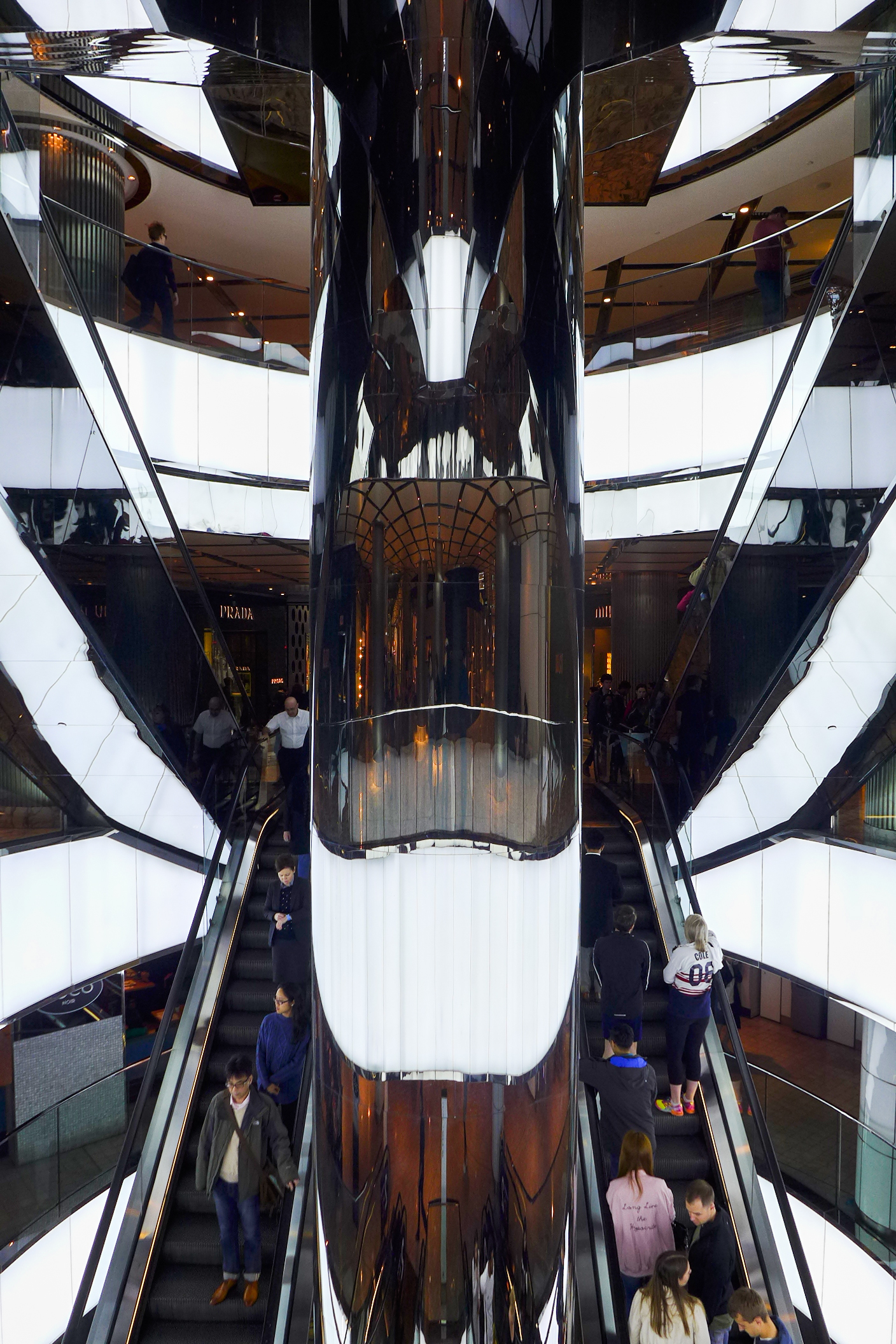
Main escalators

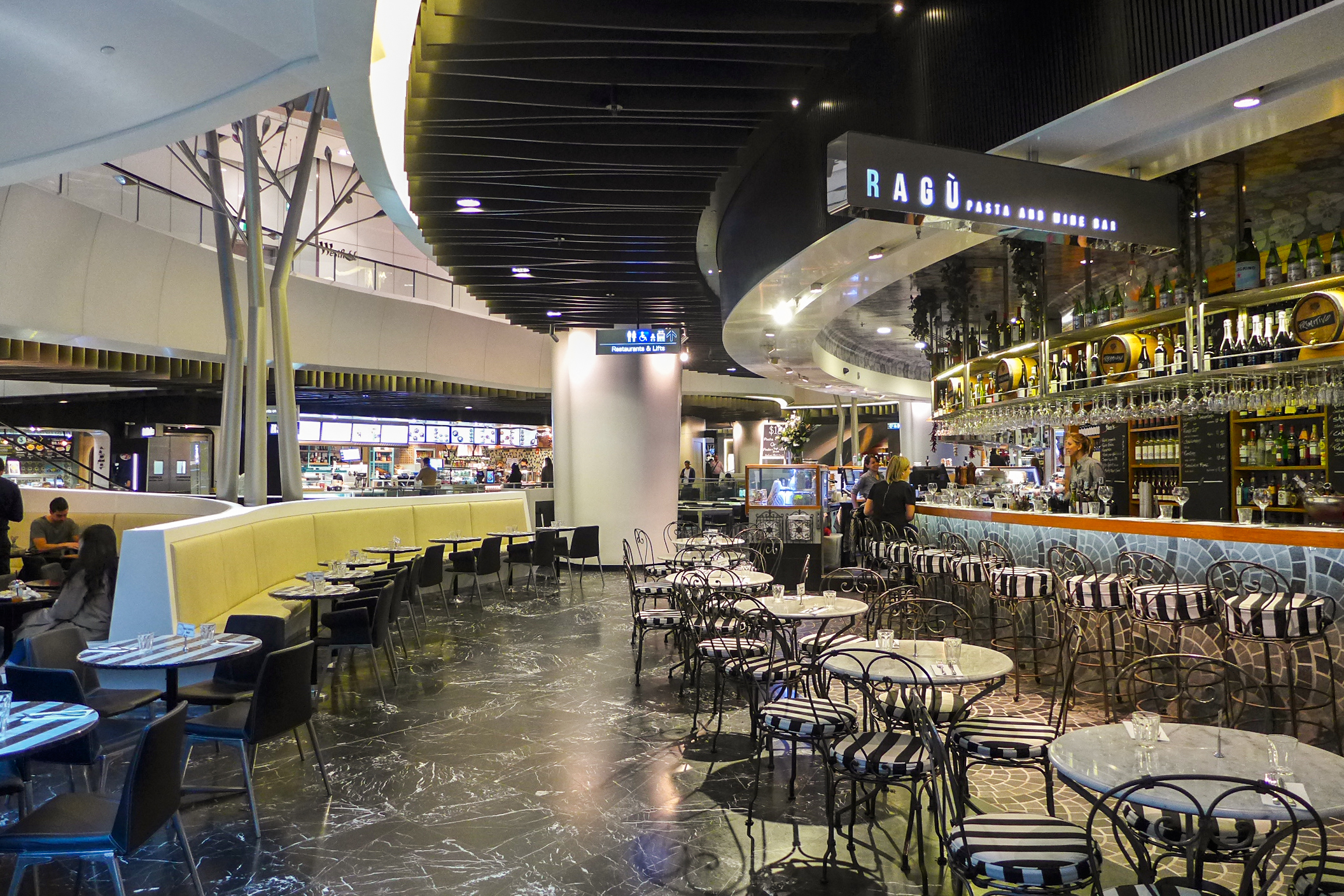
Level 5 Food Court

Westfield Sydney is built on land that were originally occupied by Imperial Arcade, Centrepoint Shopping Centre (later Westfield Centrepoint), Skygarden and Sydney Central Plaza.

The oldest of these was Imperial Arcade originally opened in 1891 and was closed and demolished in 1961. It was designed by prominent Sydney architect Thomas Rowe. The new Imperial Arcade was developed on the site by property developers Stocks and Holdings Ltd (now Stockland), the company's first Sydney city centre redevelopment project. It was opened on 18 October 1965 by the Premier of New South Wales, Robert Askin. It consisted of four shopping levels with office space above. Imperial Arcade featured the Sydney's flagship Angus & Robertson bookstore. It was purchased by the Westfield Group in 2004 for $90 million.

Centrepoint Shopping Centre opened in 1972 with 52 stores. The centre was refurbished in 1984 and further upgraded in 1996 and 2000. Centrepoint was purchased by the Westfield Group in December 2001 and later renamed to Westfield Centrepoint and housed over 140 stores. Westfield Centrepoint provided skybridge connections to two of Australia's major department stores, Myer and David Jones. There was also a connection to Imperial Arcade.

Skygarden shopping centre, built behind two heritage listed buildings and located below the Skygarden Tower office building, opened in 1988. The centre featured seven levels of retail and restaurants as well as a food court known as the Skydining zone beneath a glazed roof. It was purchased by the Westfield Group in 2004.

Sydney Central Plaza opened in 1998 after a refurbishment of the flagship Myer department store and features 87 stores on the two lower levels of the Myer store. It was later purchased by the Westfield Group in 2003. Sydney Central Plaza is located inside the old Farmer & Company department store building which was built in 1874. Farmer & Company was purchased by Myer in 1961 and the store was rebranded to Myer in 1976. In 1983 Grace Bros purchased Myer and the store was rebranded to Grace Bros before reverting to Myer in 2004. Sydney Central Plaza provided a skybridge connection to Westfield Centrepoint and also has connections to MidCity and Queen Victoria Building.

On 4 July 2009, Westfield Group commenced construction on the redevelopment. Approximately $930 million was invested in redeveloping Westfield Centrepoint, Skygarden, Imperial Arcade and Sydney Central Plaza.

Westfield Centrepoint, Skygarden and Imperial Arcade were merged and redeveloped to become Westfield Sydney. Imperial Arcade was demolished and Skygarden and Westfield Centrepoint were refurbished. Across Pitt Street Mall, Sydney Central Plaza was rebranded as an extension of Westfield Sydney.

Stage 1 of the development opened in October 2010 with approximately 130 specialty stores. The centre fronts Pitt Street Mall, one of the world's most expensive shopping streets by rent; Castlereagh Street, arguably Australia's most exclusive luxury shopping street; and Market Street.

Stage 2 opened a further 120 stores between November 2010 and late-2011. The opening of a 25-storey commercial tower at 85 Castlereagh Street marked the completion of the total project in early 2012.

== Future ==
On 8 August 2016 South African Woolworths sold the David Jones menswear and food store building in Market Street to Scentre Group and Cbus Property for $360 million. The David Jones building is connected to Westfield Sydney through a skybridge. Plans for the two buyers were that Scentre Group will redevelop the retail floors to adjoin its Westfield Sydney, while Cbus will develop the air rights into apartments. David Jones was to occupy the building until late 2019 under a lease agreement which provided a 4.5 per cent per annum rental return on the acquisition price.

On 12 February 2020 David Jones closed its store on Market Street and plans for the building includes a curved 22-storey residential tower featuring 101 apartments and six levels of serviced office space around 11,500 m^{2}. The retail development managed by Scentre Group will include five levels of retail space focusing on luxury and food. The office space will have its own entrance but be connected to the shopping centre with a central atrium to create a vertical flow of light.

Construction on both the retail, office and apartments commenced in December 2020. Completion of the retail and commercial components is expected to occur in late 2022, while the residential tower is expected to be complete in the second half of 2023.

== Tenants ==
Westfield Sydney has 91,699m² of floor space. The major attraction of Westfield Sydney is Sydney Tower which includes the Sydney Tower Eye observation deck, SKYWALK, Infinity at Sydney Tower, Bar 83 at Sydney Tower, SkyFeast at Sydney Tower.

Major retailers include Myer, Zara, and JB Hi-Fi.

== Gallery ==
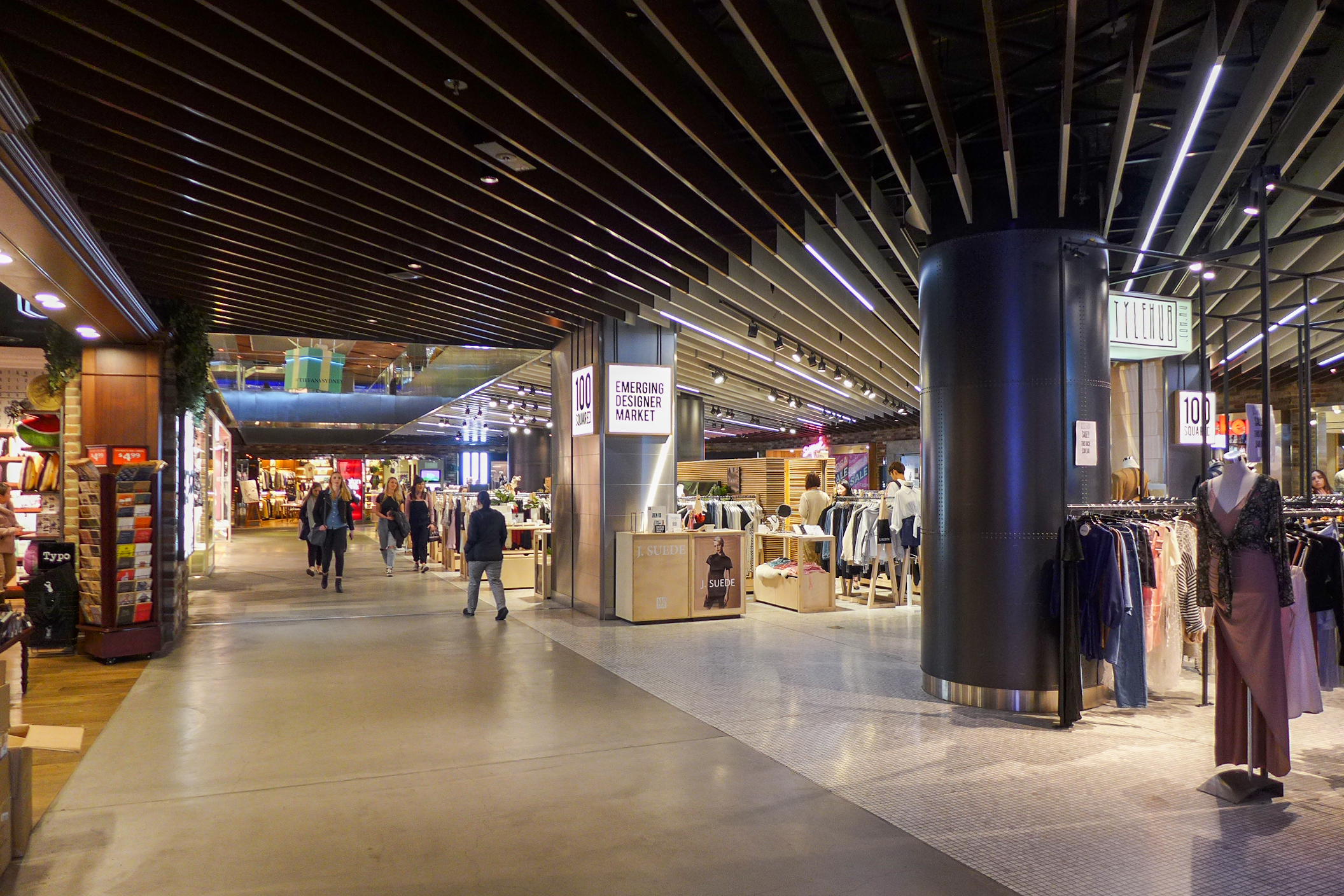
Level 1 Shops

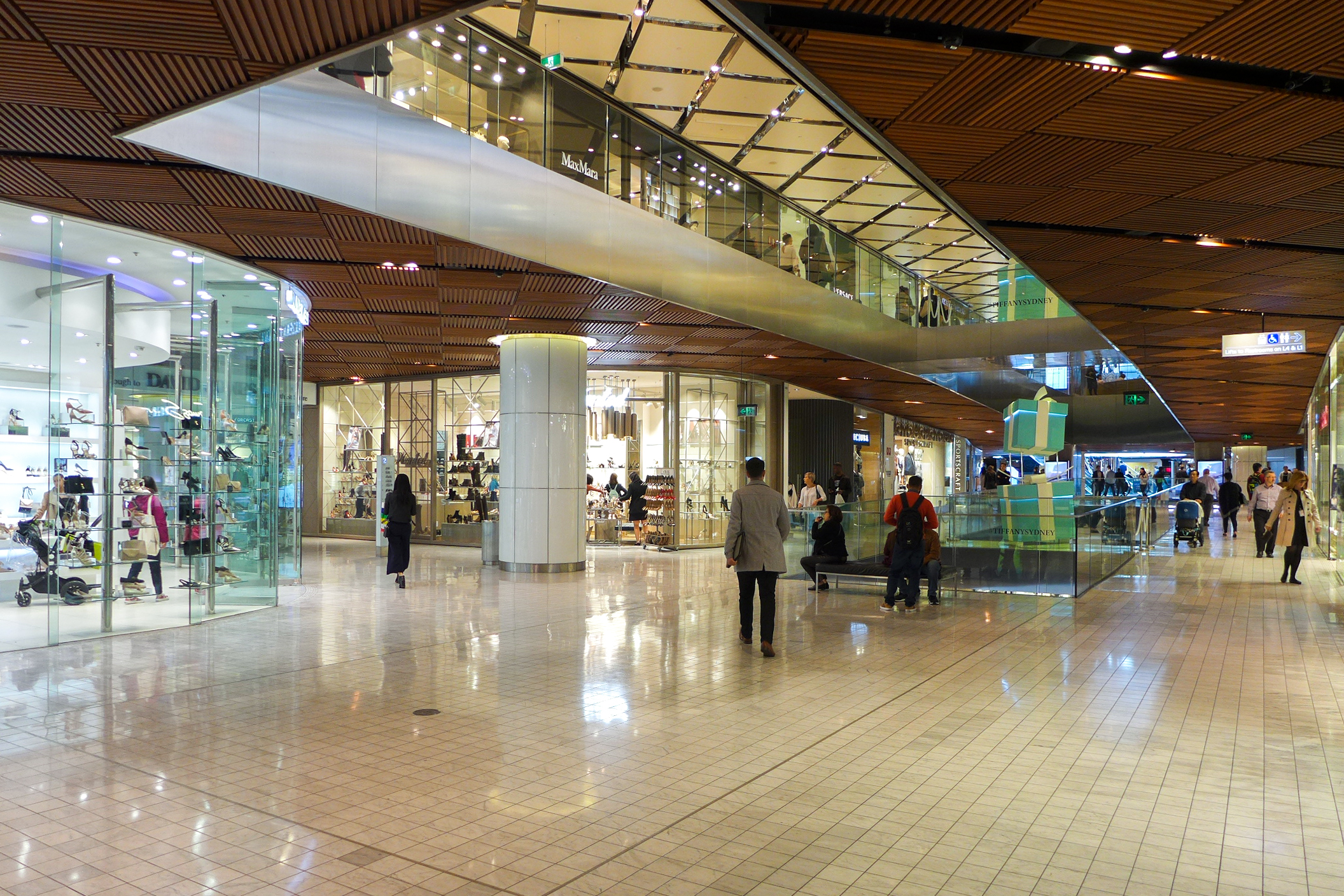
Level 2 Shops

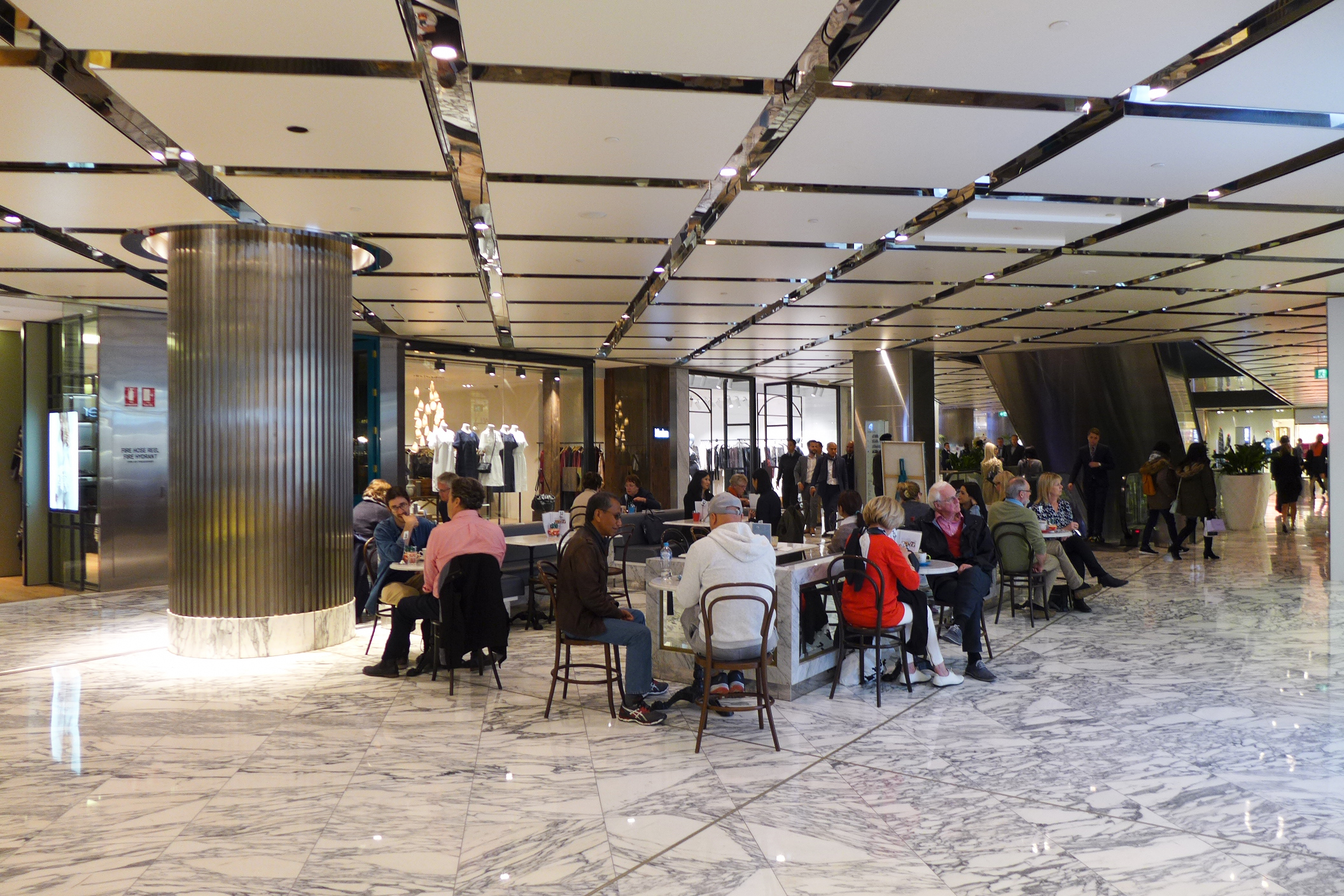
Level 3 Restaurants and shops

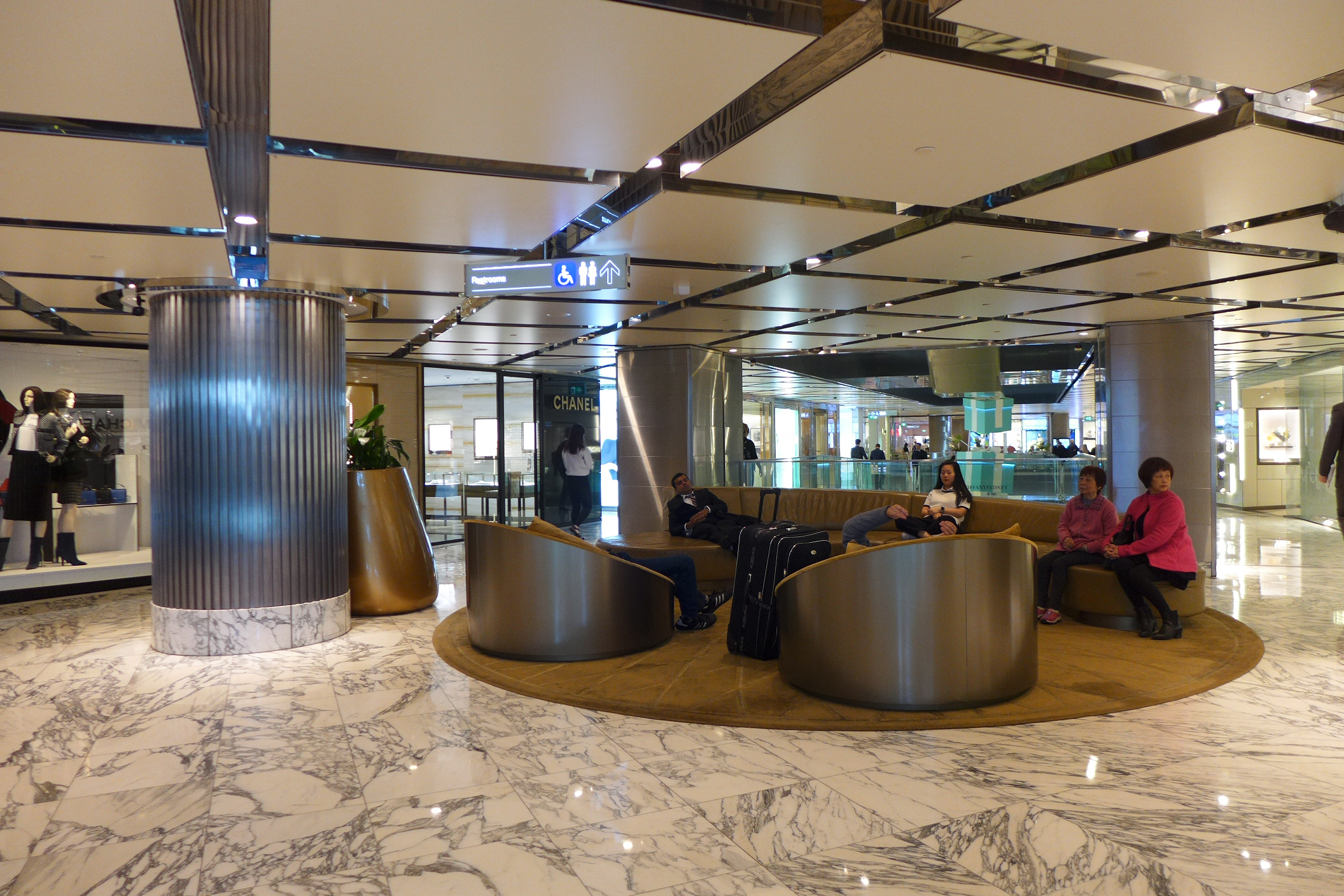
Level 4 Seats Area

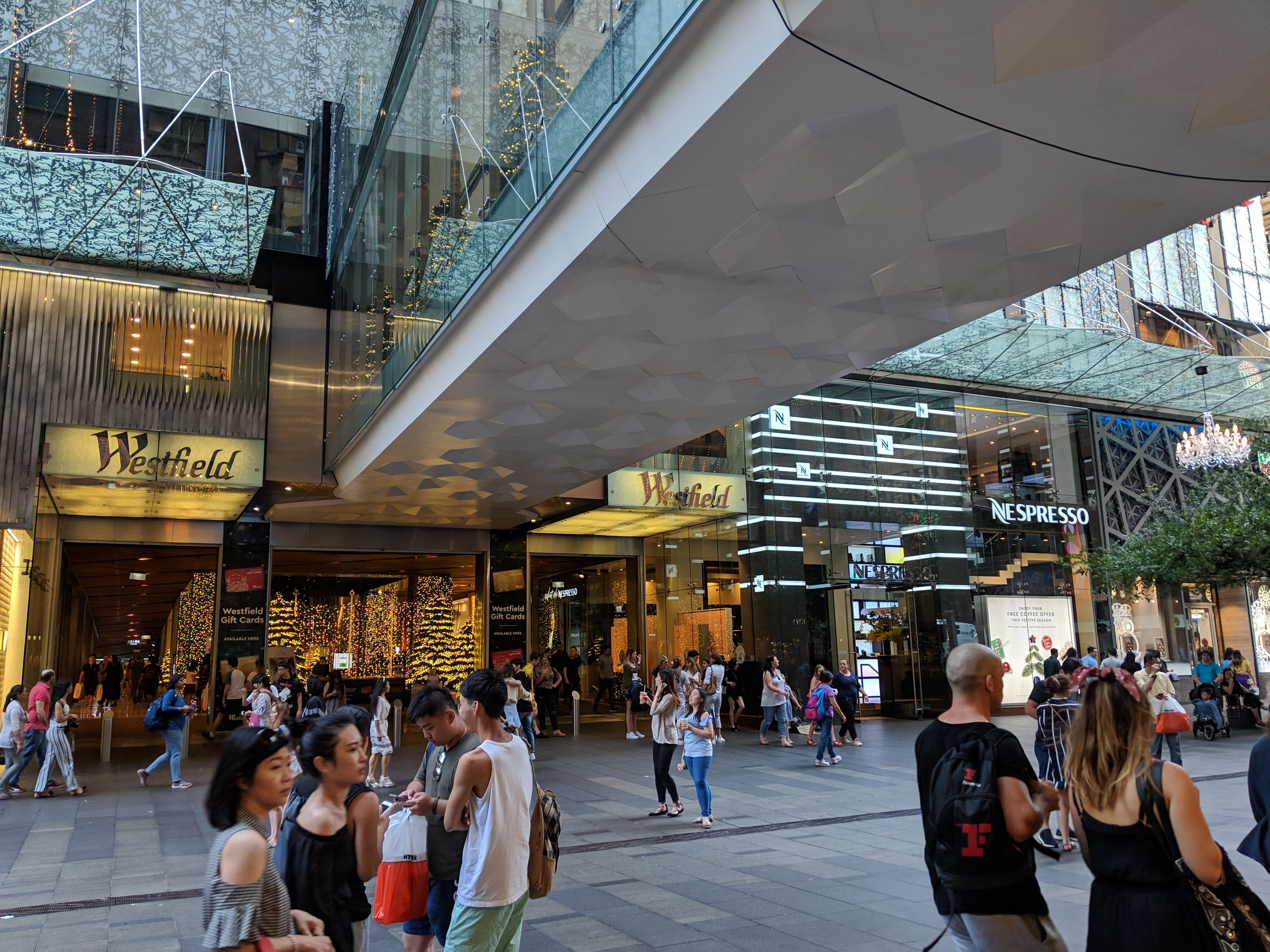
Pitt Street Mall frontage

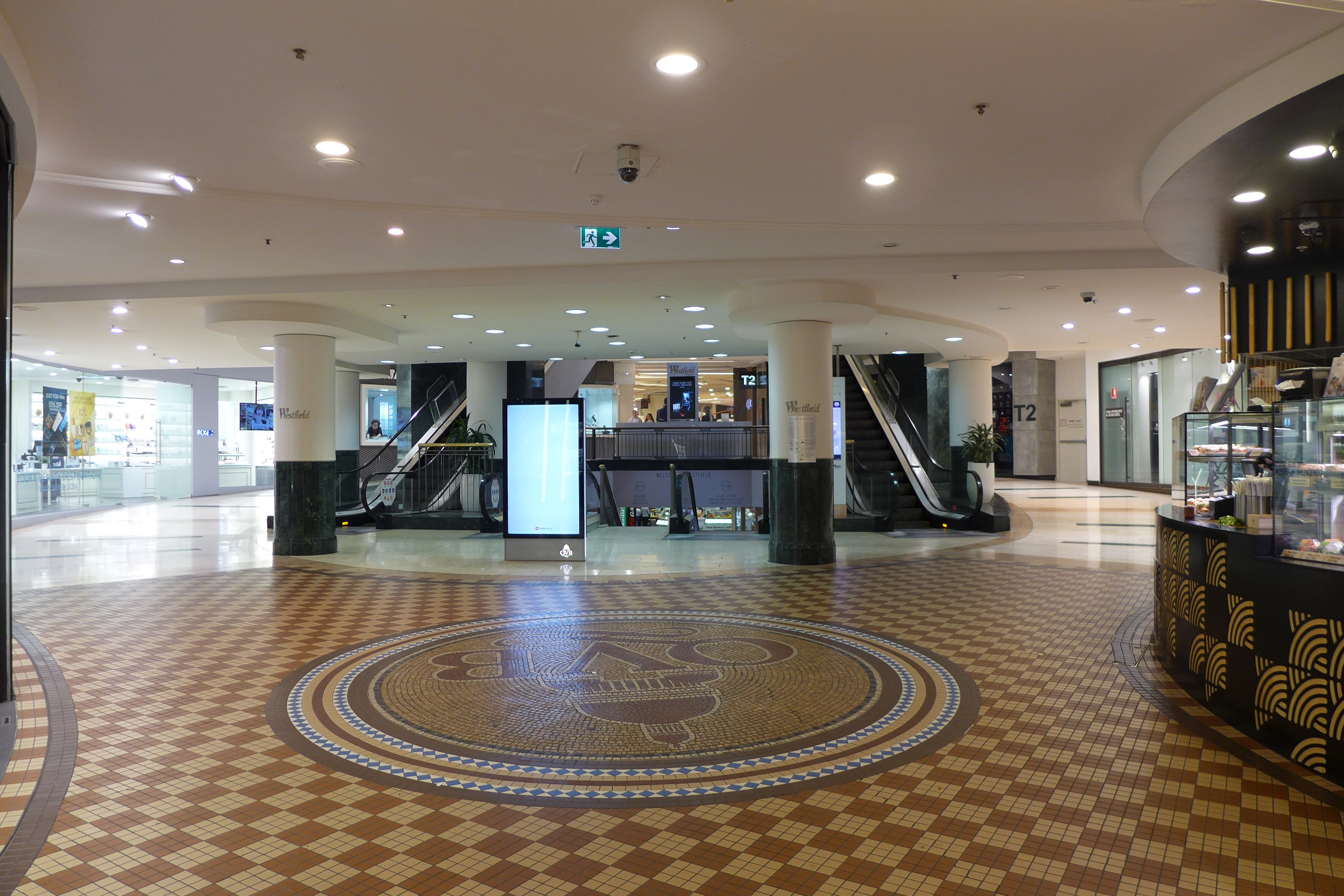
Basement Entrance from QVB
