= Sydney Tower =

Tall structure in Sydney, New South Wales, Australia

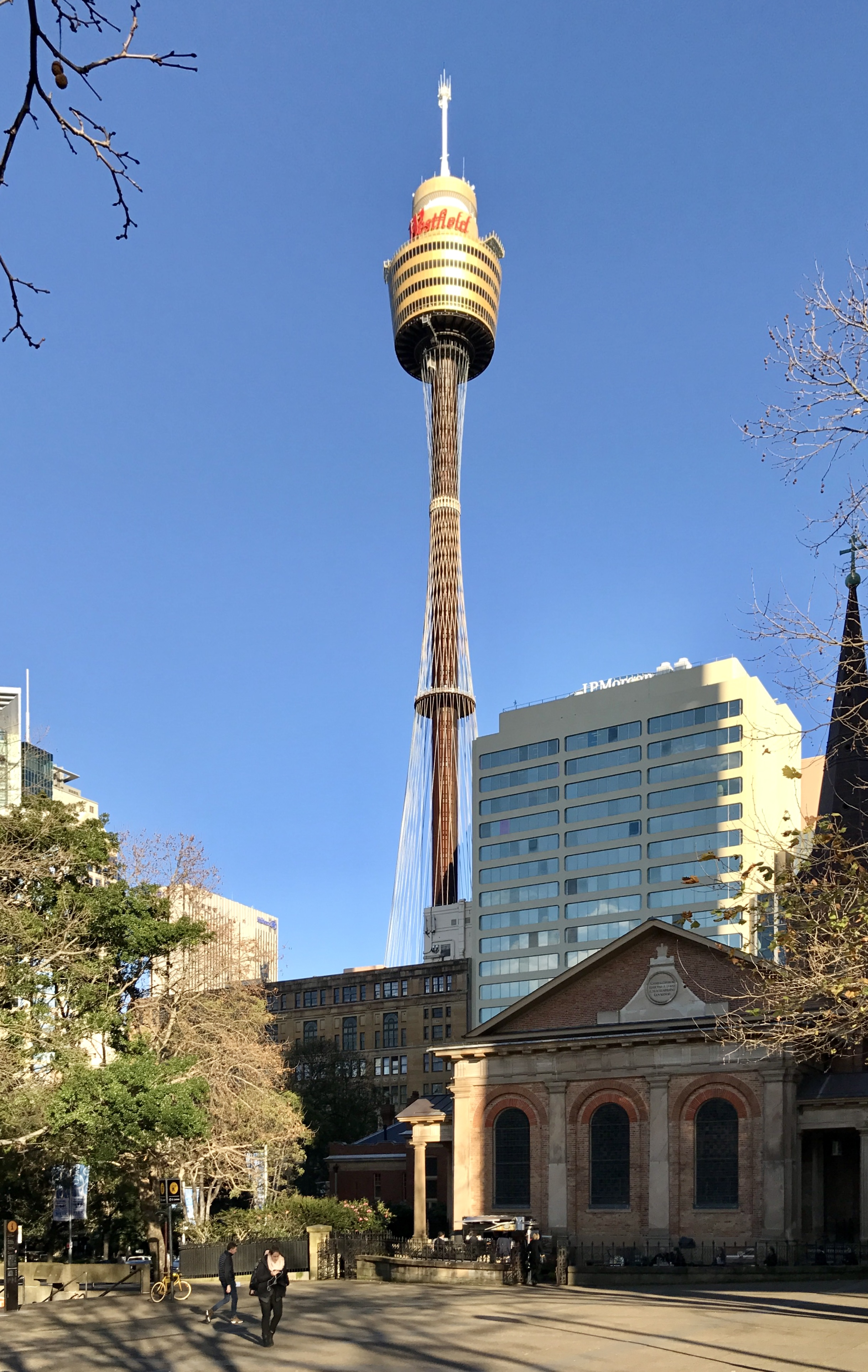
- Alternative names: Westfield Tower; Centrepoint Tower

General information
- Type: Observation and communications tower
- Location: Sydney, Australia
- Coordinates: 33°52′13″S 151°12′32″E
- Construction started: 1970 (office building); 1975 (tower)
- Completed: 1981
- Opened: 25 September 1981
- Cost: A$36 million
- Owner: Scentre Group
- Operator: Trippas White Group; Merlin Entertainments

Height
- Antenna spire: 309 m (1,014 ft)
- Roof: 277 m (909 ft): Sydney Tower Skywalk
- Top floor: 250 m (820 ft): Observation deck (Sydney Tower Eye)

Technical details
- Floor count: 4
- Lifts/elevators: 3

Design and construction
- Architects: Donald Crone & Associates
- Developer: AMP
- Main contractor: Concrete Constructions

Website
- www.sydneytowereye.com.au

Sydney Tower, also known as the Sydney Tower Eye, Westfield Tower and formerly albeit still commonly as Centrepoint Tower, is an observation and telecommunications tower which is the tallest structure in Sydney, as well as the second-tallest observation tower in the Southern Hemisphere (after Sky Tower in Auckland). Sydney Tower has also previously been known as the AMP Tower.

The tower stands 309 m (1,014 ft) above the Sydney central business district (CBD), located on Market Street, between Pitt and Castlereagh Streets. It is accessible from the Pitt Street Mall, Market Street or Castlereagh Street and sits above the Westfield Sydney (formerly Centrepoint) shopping centre. The tower is open to the public, and is one of the most prominent tourist attractions in the city, being visible from a number of vantage points throughout town and from adjoining suburbs. Auckland's Sky Tower is taller at the top of its spire than Sydney Tower, however Sydney Tower's main observation deck is almost 30 m (98 ft) higher than the observation deck on Sky Tower.

While the shopping centre at the base of the tower is run by the Scentre Group, the tower itself is occupied by Trippas White Group, which owns and operates Sydney Tower Dining, and Merlin Entertainments, which owns and operates the Sydney Tower Eye observation deck and outside adventure experience known as the SKYWALK.

== History ==
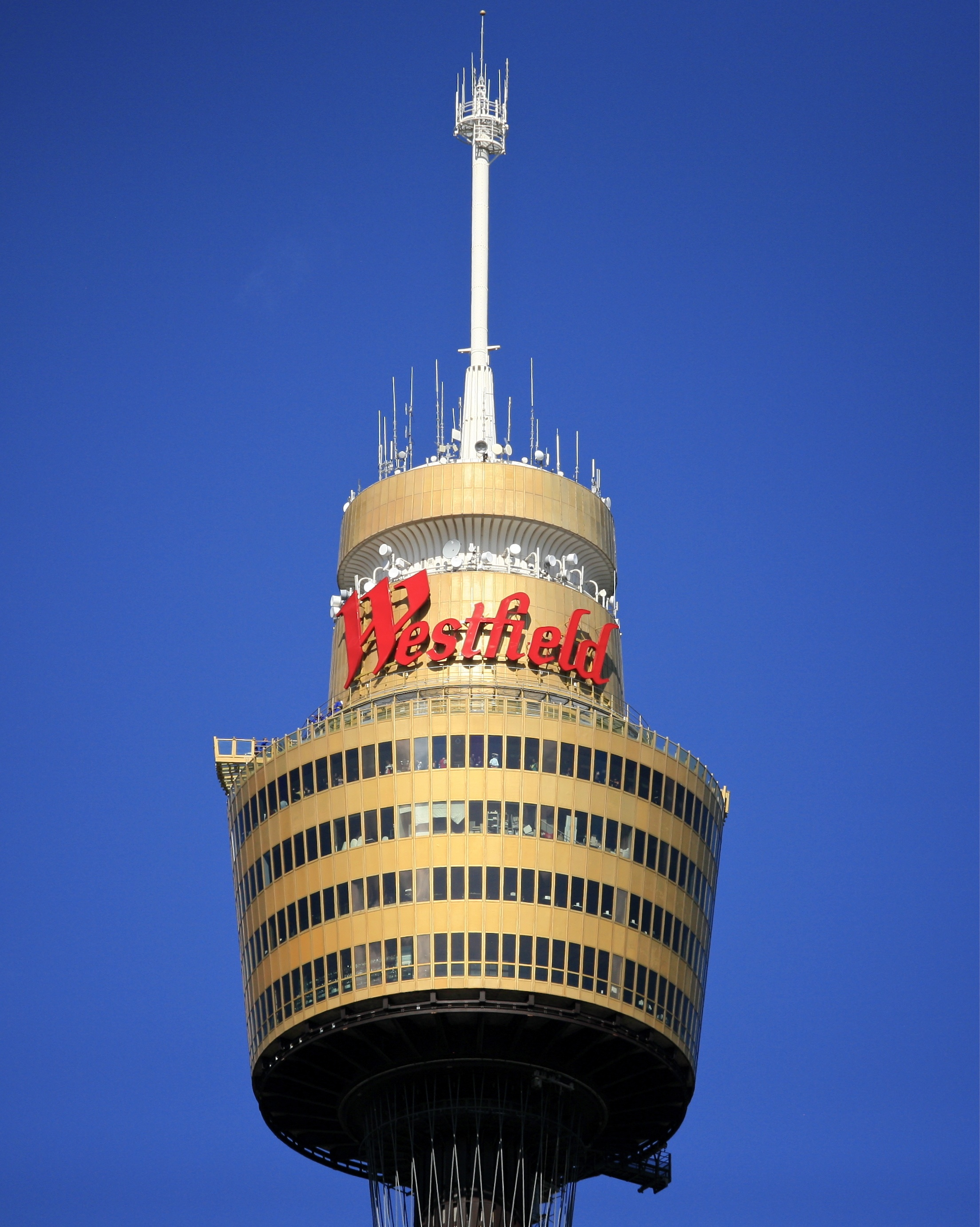
The turret of the tower, with current Westfield branding

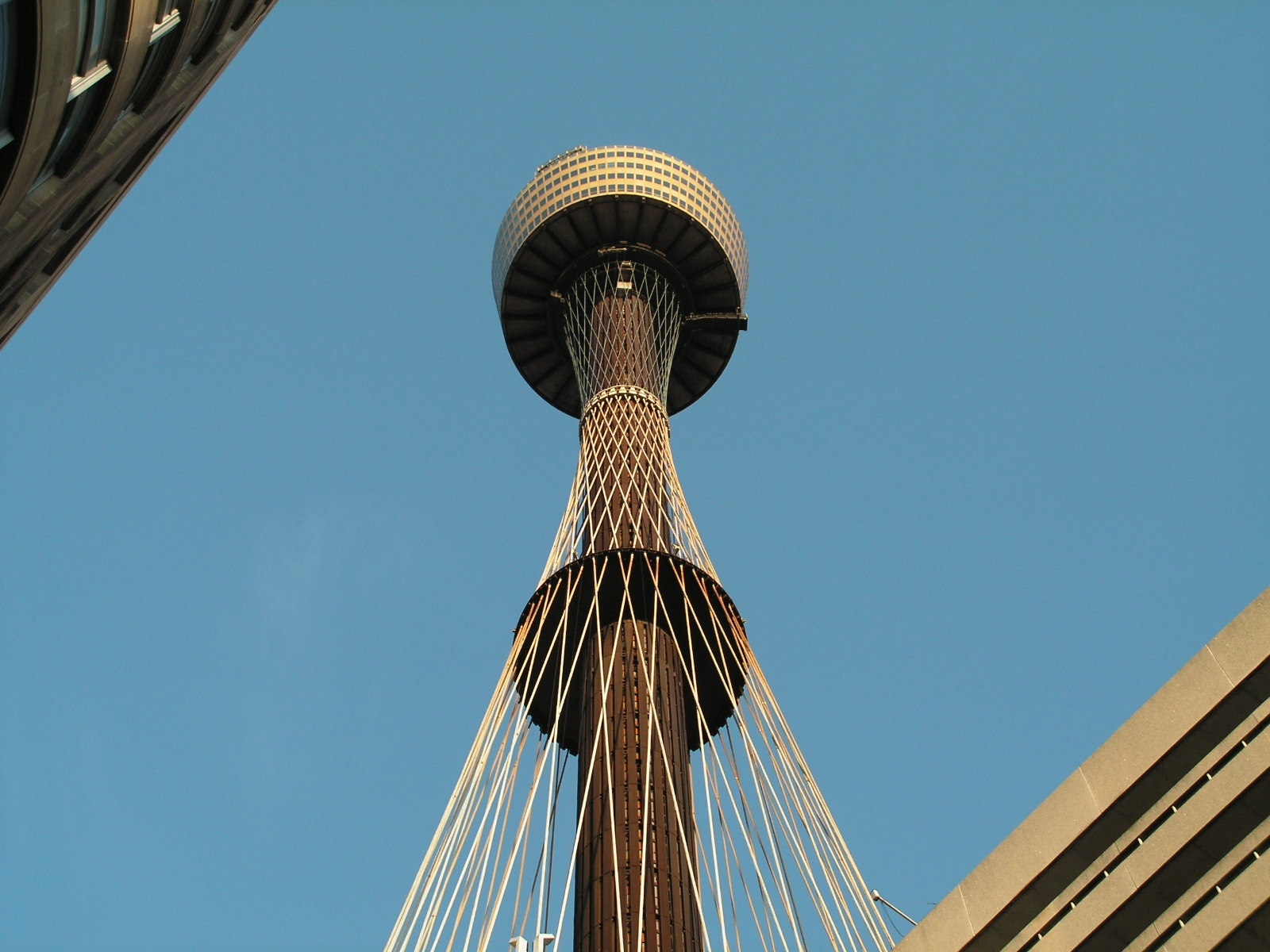
External bracing on the tower

Designed by Australian architect Donald Crone, the first plans for Sydney Tower were unveiled in March 1968. Construction of the office building started in 1970, and tower construction began in 1975. Prior to construction of the tower, the height limit in Sydney had been set at 279 m (915 ft), to allow for the harbour's flying boats that were popular before the jet era. It was developed by AMP, with Concrete Constructions the main contractor.

Public access to the tower began on 25 September 1981. The total cost of construction was A$36 million. In 1998, the addition of a lightning rod to the top of spire extended the tower's overall height from 305 metres to 309 m (1,014 ft), which is 327 m (1,073 ft) above sea level.

While AMP managed the Centrepoint shopping centre, the tower was officially referred to as the AMP Tower. After the Westfield Group took over ownership of Centrepoint in December 2001, the name was changed to Sydney Tower.

In 2009, the base building was closed and stripped for a major refurbishment. This involved the connection of the shopping centre to other arcades and a complete upgrade of all the sites. The shopping centre was progressively reopened from 2010 and was renamed Westfield Sydney. In June 2011 the AMP banner was removed by helicopter from the tower and replaced by a large illuminated Westfield logo.

In 2011, Merlin Entertainments acquired the rights to operate the observation deck, renaming the attraction the Sydney Tower Eye.

== Structure ==
=== Sections ===
Four sections of the tower are open to the public, three being occupied by Sydney Tower Dining. 360 Bar and Dining, which offers revolving views of the Sydney skyline, is located on level one of the Sydney Tower. Sydney Tower Buffet, a contemporary self-select restaurant, is on the tower's second level. Studio, located on level three can cater for cocktail functions for 200 people and 156 sit-down guests.

The observation deck, currently called the Sydney Tower Eye, is located on level four of Sydney Tower. To access this level, visitors can buy a pass from the operating company or at the gate. The pass allows access to other Sydney attractions including Wild Life Sydney and the Sydney Aquarium. The Sydney Tower Eye is located 250 m (820 ft) above ground level. It has a fully enclosed viewing platform featuring 360-degree views of the city and surrounding areas. This floor also houses a small gift shop, multilingual touchscreens and a readout that displays data about the wind speed, direction, sway amplitude, and other statistics of the tower. On 23 September 2011, a 4D cinema was opened on the fourth floor of the arcade, playing a film with footage from various locations in Sydney. The theatre is the first of its kind in Australia; in-theatre effects include wind, bubbles, and fire.

Skywalk is an open-air glass-floored platform encircling the Sydney Tower Eye at a height of 268 m (879 ft) above ground level. The viewing platform extends over the edge of the main structure of the deck. It was opened on 18 October 2005, cost A$3.75 million to construct, took four years to design and two months to build. This platform is only accessible as part of planned and booked tours.

=== Details ===
The golden turret near the top of the tower has a maximum capacity of 960 people. Travel to the observation deck is by three high speed double-deck lifts, each with a capacity of 8 to 10 people. The lifts travel at full, half or quarter speed, depending on wind conditions. At full speed the lifts reach the deck in 45 seconds.

== Cultural events ==
Leading up to the 2000 Summer Olympics, the tower was decorated with sculptures by Australian artist Dominique Sutton (an athlete rising from starting blocks, a gymnast performing a handstand, and a wheelchair basketball player passing the ball) which were positioned above the main body of the tower and in some cases overhung the edges. These sculptures were removed in 2002 and relocated to Sydney Olympic Park at Homebush Bay. The figures were placed atop the tower using an S-64 Aircrane heavy lift helicopter known as "Elvis".

On several occasions, the tower has been used to launch fireworks or it has been illuminated with coloured lights as part of various celebrations in Sydney, such as New Year's Eve or during the Olympics in 2000.

Each year the Sydney Tower Stair Challenge comprises the challenge of running up 1,504 stairs from Pitt Street Mall to the Observation Deck. The event is to raise money for the Cancer Council, and the two winners become eligible to compete in the Empire State Building Run-up. However, the event was cancelled in both 2011 and 2012.

== Incidents ==
On 8 March 2018, the Skywalk was closed for five weeks following the suicide of a 21-year-old woman who removed her safety harness and leapt from the tower while on a tour. The Skywalk reopened on 12 April 2018, after conducting a probe into the incident and the tower having upgraded the safety equipment.

The second suicide took place on 8 July that same year. Leonard Nherera, 18, jumped 268 metres to his death from the Skywalk tour at 7pm.

== Engineering heritage award ==
The tower received an Engineering Heritage Plaque from Engineers Australia as part of its Engineering Heritage Recognition Program.

== In popular culture ==
- The tower appeared in the 1990 Disney animated film The Rescuers Down Under and the 2003 Disney/Pixar animated film Finding Nemo.
- In the 2000 film Mission: Impossible 2, the tower is seen in several shots, usually shown whenever the CBD of Sydney appears.
- The tower was featured in the 1995 film Mighty Morphin Power Rangers: The Movie, where it was used as the Angel Grove Observatory. A CGI simulation of the tower was used when it became a weapon for the main villain, Ivan Ooze in the film's climactic battle.
- In the 1999 film The Matrix, the tower can be seen in the background of multiple shots, most notably when Neo is scaling the office building or the helicopter crash towards the end of the film.
- The tower is destroyed in the films Godzilla: Final Wars and Supernova.
- The tower is demolished in the 2017 short film Waltzing Tilda.

== See also ==
- Sky Tower (Auckland)
