= Glasshouse (Sydney) =

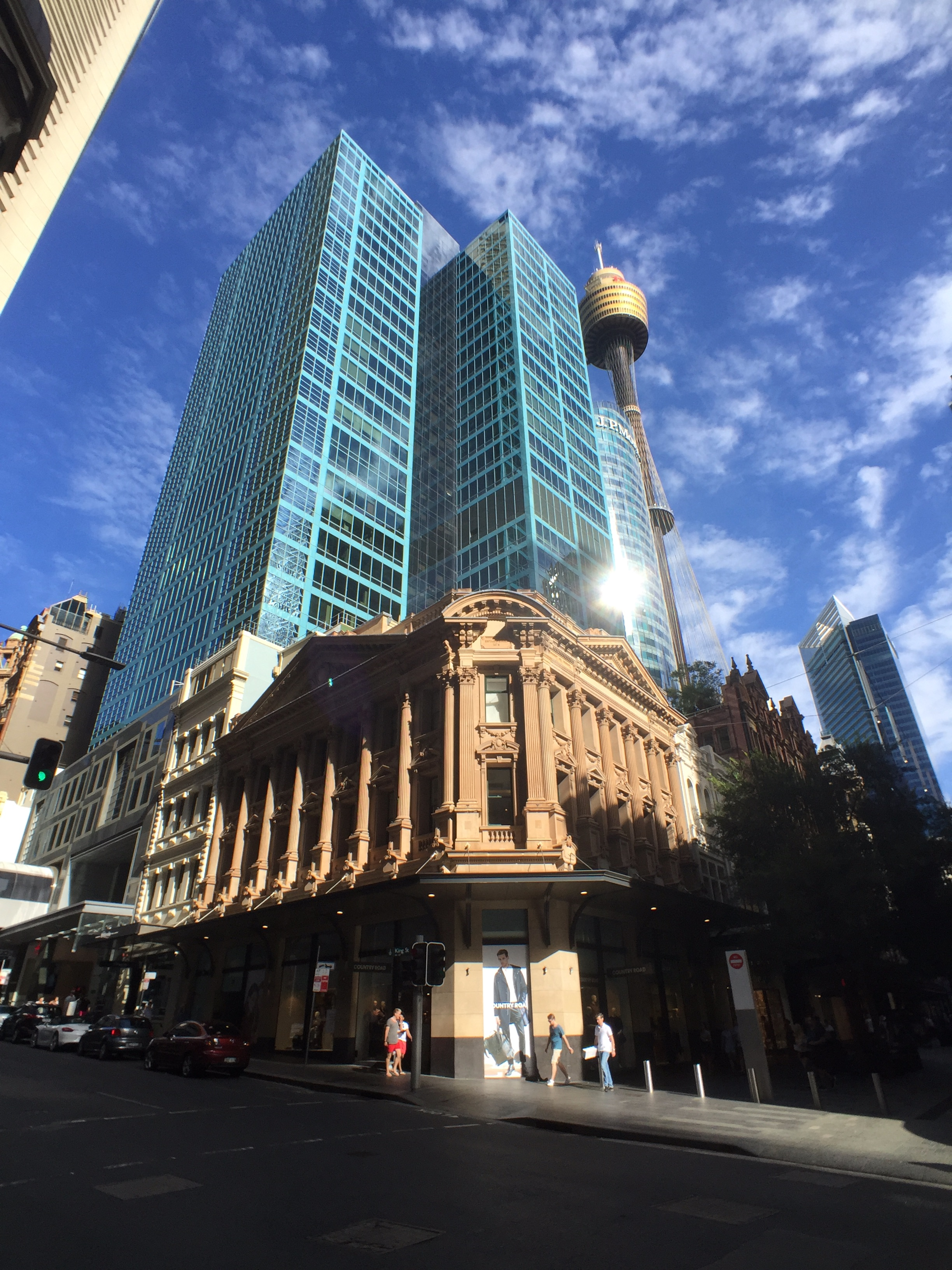
- Glasshouse from King Street
- Location: Sydney, New South Wales, Australia
- Coordinates: 33°52′09″S 151°12′32″E
- Address: 135 King Street, Sydney
- Opened: 1990; 36 years ago
- Owner: Investa Commercial Property Fund
- Num. of stores: 2
- Num. of anchor tenants: 1
- Floor area: 5,000 m^{2} (53,820 sq ft)
- Floors: 3
- Parking: 172

Glasshouse (previously known as Stockland Glasshouse, Glasshouse Shopping Centre and Glasshouse on the Mall) is an office and retail building in the Sydney central business district. It is located on the corner of King Street and Pitt Street Mall, adjacent to Westfield Sydney and is opposite MidCity, The Strand Arcade and Sydney Arcade.

Glasshouse is a 25 floor office complex with retail on the floors below. Its tenants include Sydney's largest H&M store and Platypus Shoes on multiple levels with about 5,000 square metres retail area. Access to the retail levels is from Pitt Street Mall, King Street, Westfield Sydney and a skybridge from 25 Martin Place.

== History ==
The Glasshouse office and retail building was built in 1990 at a cost of $200 million. The 25 storey office building featured 30,000m² of office space whilst the 3 level shopping centre featured 10,000m² of retail space.

The shopping centre was originally known as "Glasshouse on the Mall" and featured 27 specialty stores on three floors and a food court on the ground floor. Since the building is L-shaped the shopping centre is in that shape.

In June 2003 Stockland acquired 50% of the building in both office and retail.

On 2 May 2014 Japanese retailer Uniqlo opened its pop up store in the centre. The store operated in the centre until 26 November 2014 when it moved to MidCity.

In September 2014, Stockland and Investa Commercial Property Fund, drew up plans for a $30 million redevelopment with H&M as the anchor tenant. As part of the redevelopment, the historic facade of the building that was retained, but the entire interior of what was an L-shaped arcade between King and Pitt Streets was demolished and transformed.

H&M opened its store on 31 October 2015 followed by the opening of Zara Home on 3 December 2015.

On 28 November 2018 Zara Home decided not to renew its lease and closed down. The space was taken over by Platypus Shoes which opened their flagship store on 11 April 2019.
