= Market Street, Sydney =

Street in Sydney, Australia

Market Street, Sydney New South Wales
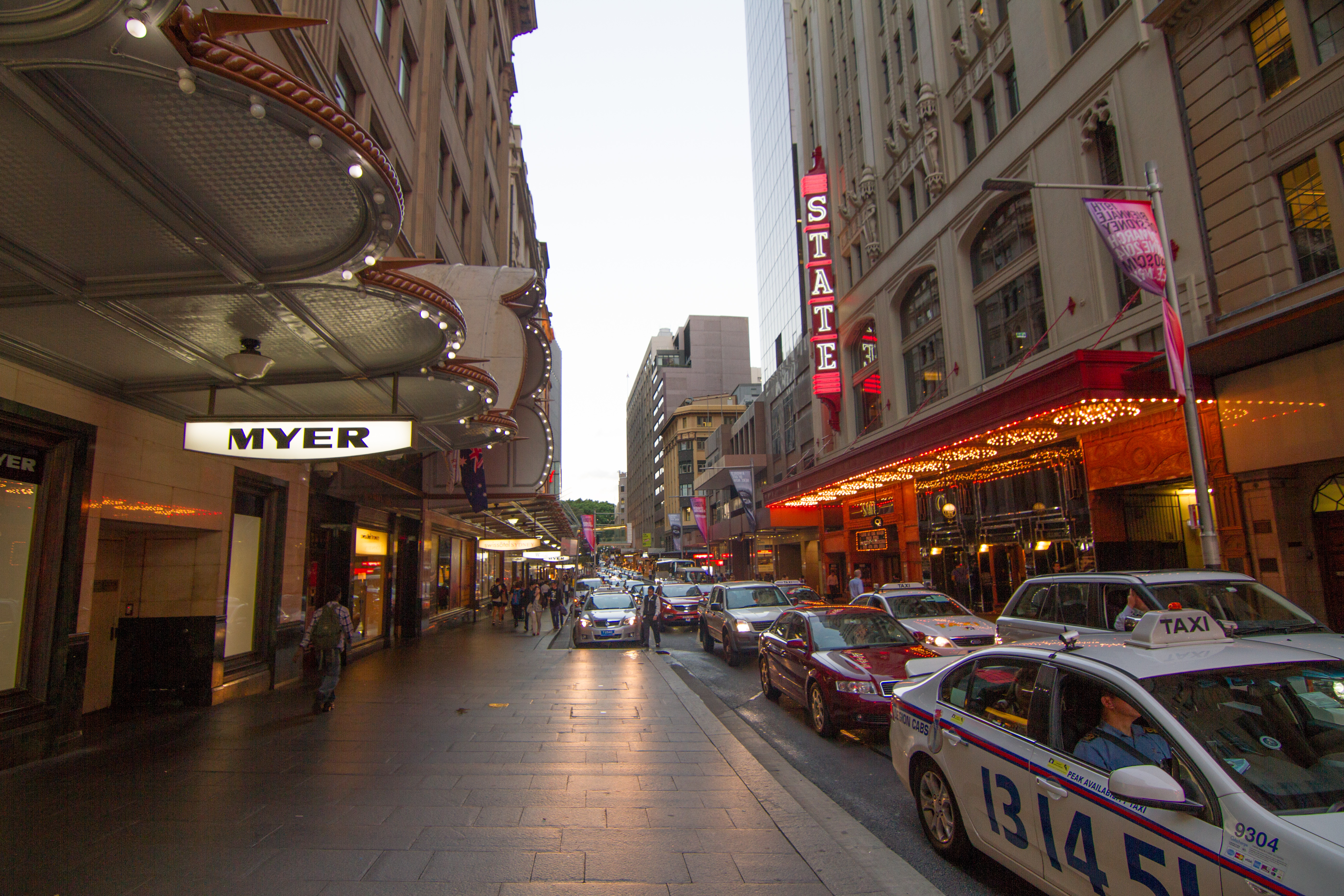
- Market Street
- Coordinates: 33.870901°S 151.203876°E (Western end); 33.870730°S 151.210207°E (Eastern end)

General information
- Type: Street
- Length: 600 m (0.4 mi)

Major junctions
- Western end: Western Distributor; Sydney CBD
- Sussex Street; Kent Street; Clarence Street; York Street; George Street; Pitt Street; Castlereagh Street
- Eastern end: Elizabeth Street; Sydney CBD

Location(s)
- LGA(s): City of Sydney
- Major suburbs: Sydney CBD

Market Street is a street in the Sydney central business district, New South Wales, Australia. It runs from Sussex Street near Darling Harbour in the west, to Elizabeth Street at St James railway station in the east.

Market Street is located in the heart of the Sydney central business district shopping precinct. The street gets its name due to the street being located at the CBD's shopping precinct. The flagship David Jones department store in Sydney is located in Market Street. Market Street provides the southern border of Pitt Street Mall and features such shopping centres as Centrepoint, the Queen Victoria Building and Sydney Central Plaza (which includes the Sydney flagship Myer department store). The State Theatre is located between the Pitt and George Street intersections.

A footbridge at the end of Market street provides a direct link to Pyrmont Bridge and Darling Harbour. All traffic travels one way along Market Street, from east to west. A flyover is located at the end Market Street which links traffic to the Western Distributor and then Ultimo, Pyrmont, the Anzac Bridge and beyond.

Market Street is where prominent cricketer Victor Trumper owned a sporting goods store. It was at this store in a series of meetings between Trumper, James Giltinan and others, that the creation of the New South Wales Rugby Football League was conceived.

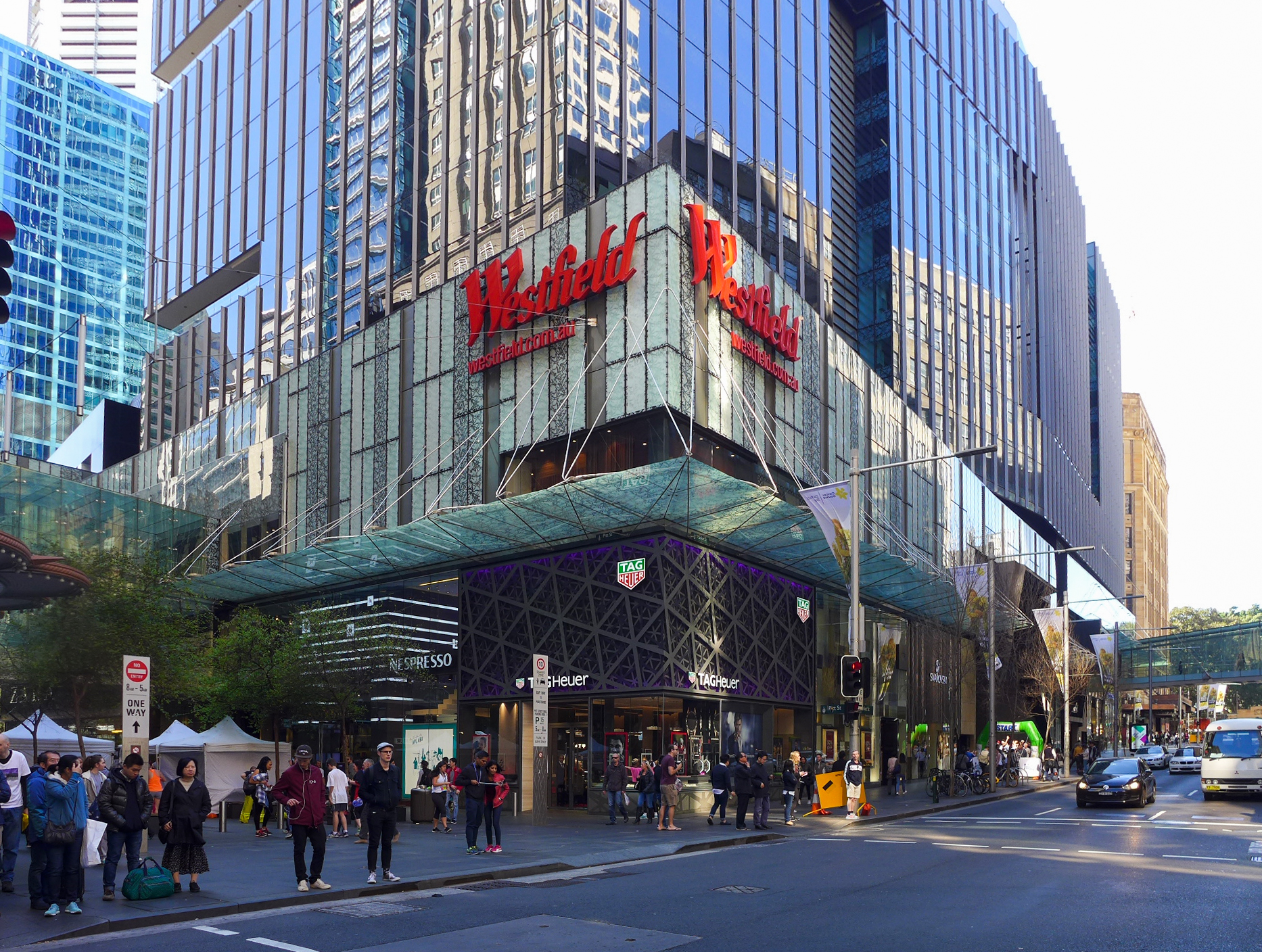
Westfield Sydney

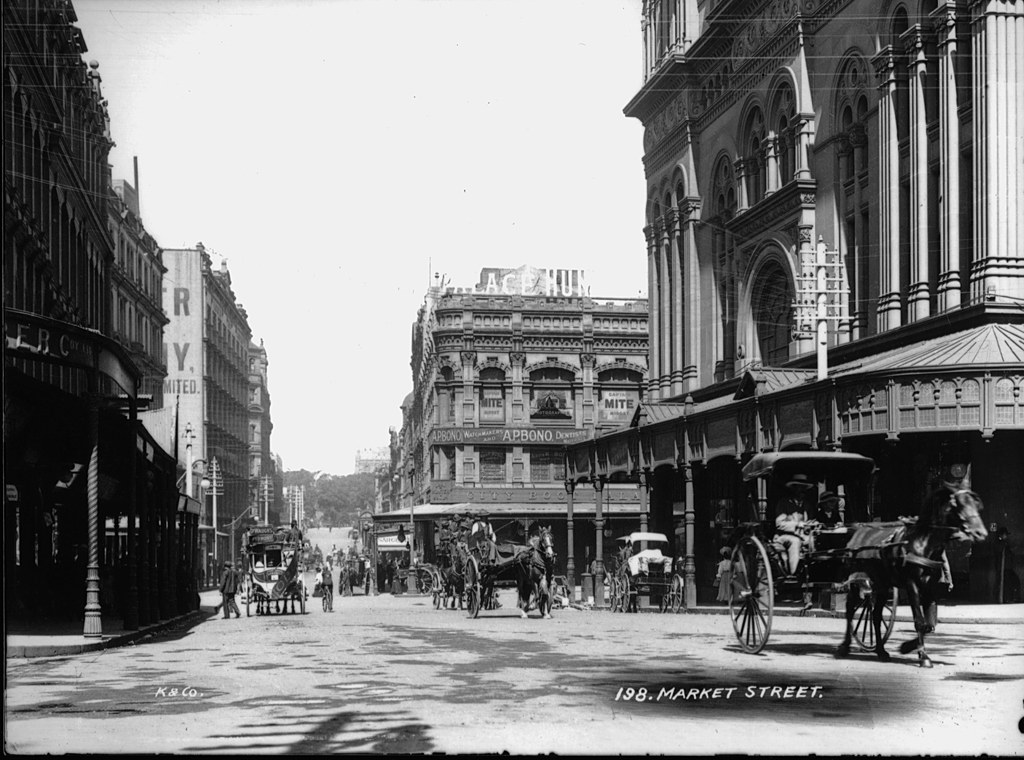
Market Street in 1900
