= Pitt Street Mall =

Thoroughfare in New South Wales, Australia

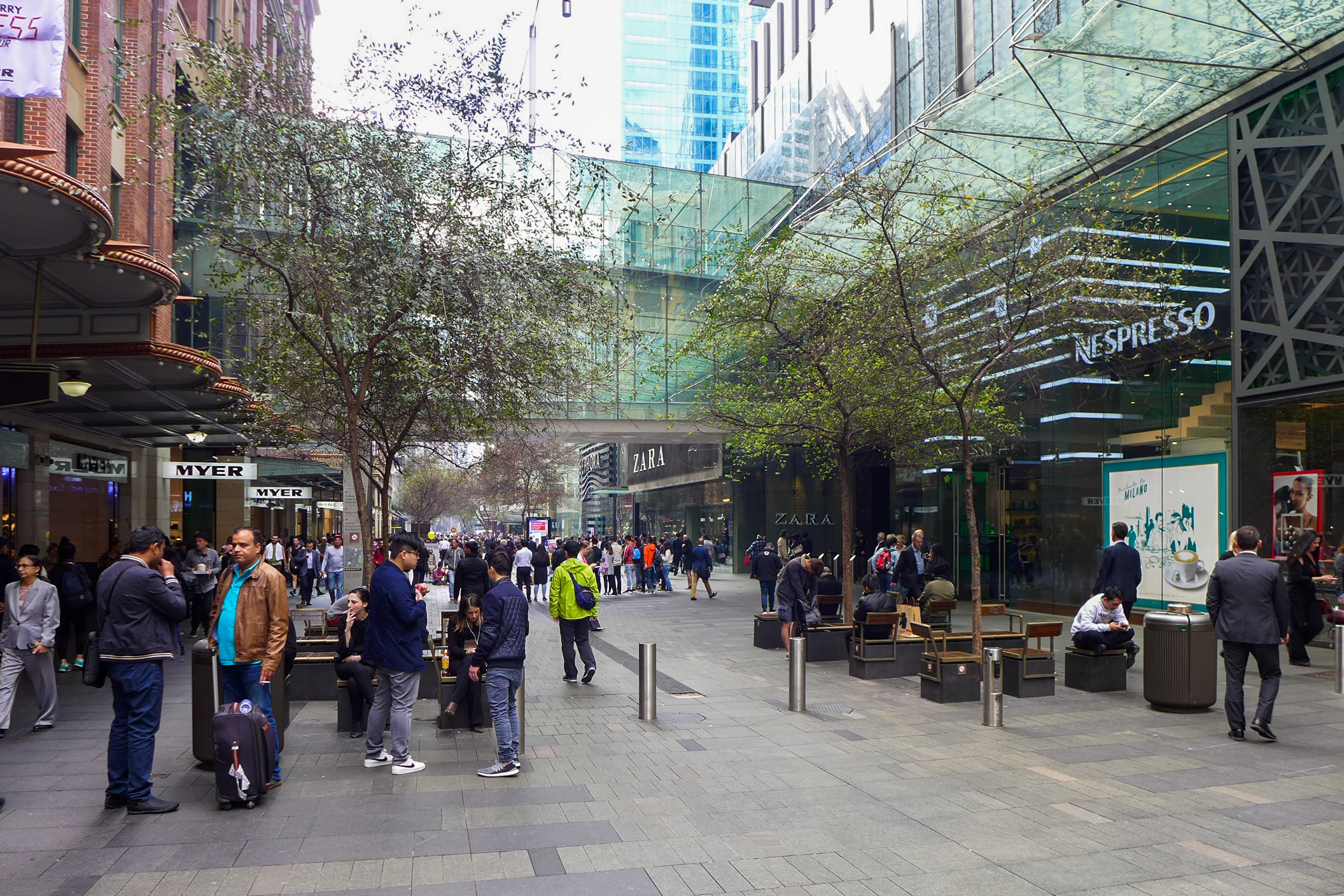
Pitt Street Mall in 2017

Pitt Street Mall is the pedestrianised section of Pitt Street in the Sydney central business district, in the Australian state of New South Wales.

Extending for approximately 200 metres in length between Market Street and King Street, spans a single city block and is one of Australia's most densely populated and cosmopolitan shopping precincts. Due in part to the fact that major shopping districts in other Australian cities are significantly longer, floorspace rents here are consistently the highest in the country. This prominence was further highlighted in 2015, when the precinct's rental costs were ranked as the fifth-highest in the world for a city street.

Despite its relatively compact physical footprint, Pitt Street Mall serves as a premier retail hub, hosting a high concentration of flagship chain stores alongside more than 400 diverse specialty retailers. Furthermore, the mall maintains a central role in the national cultural calendar as one of the primary flagship venues for Sydney Fashion Week, an event held annually during the month of May.

== History ==
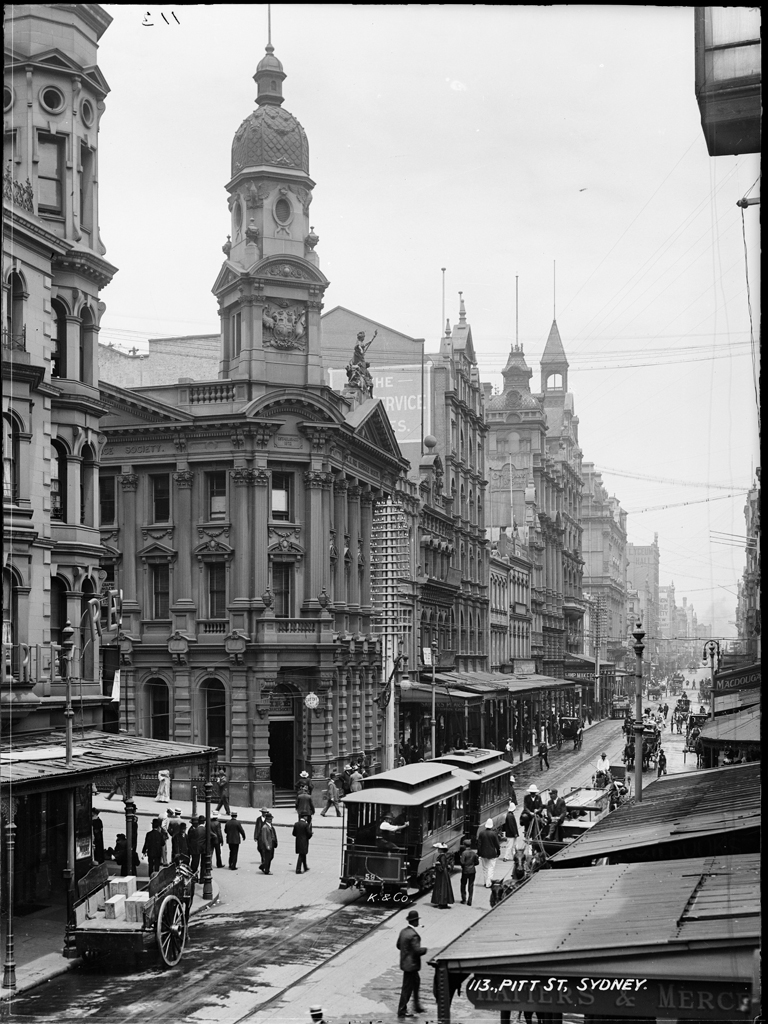
Pitt Street, looking south across the King Street intersection, ca.1900

Formerly a vehicular street, the mall was closed off to traffic in the 1990s and became a pedestrian mall. This was commonplace in various Australian cities at the time, in an effort to encourage "walk-in" business. Many prominent Australian businesses had flagship stores along Pitt Street, namely Sportsgirl and Angus & Robertson. In the mid 2000s, there were attempts to make the mall a completely pedestrian thoroughfare, diverting all vans and trucks to the underground corridor from King Street to Market Street, at the southern end of the mall.

=== 2010–2011: redevelopment ===
Along with extensive upgrades to retail areas, the Pitt Street Mall's pedestrian area saw a A$10 million refurbishment during 2010–11. This included the provision of new seating as well as new pavers and a catenary lighting system.

== Shopping centres and arcades ==
Five shopping centres and arcades are located on Pitt Street Mall:

- Westfield Sydney – Is a large, upmarket shopping centre which opened in stages from late 2010 to early 2011 and is the largest shopping centre in the CBD.
- MidCity – Is a four level shopping centre and office building which opened in 2010.
- The Strand Arcade – Opened in 1891 and is the last remaining Victorian era arcade in the Sydney CBD.
- Glasshouse – An office and retail building located on the end of Pitt Street Mall and King Street. Opened in 1990 and refurbished in 2015.
- Sydney Arcade – An arcade originally built in 1882 and was demolished in 1954. It is currently small arcade located behind the heritage listed Victorian building located at the northern end of Pitt Street Mall.

== Gallery ==
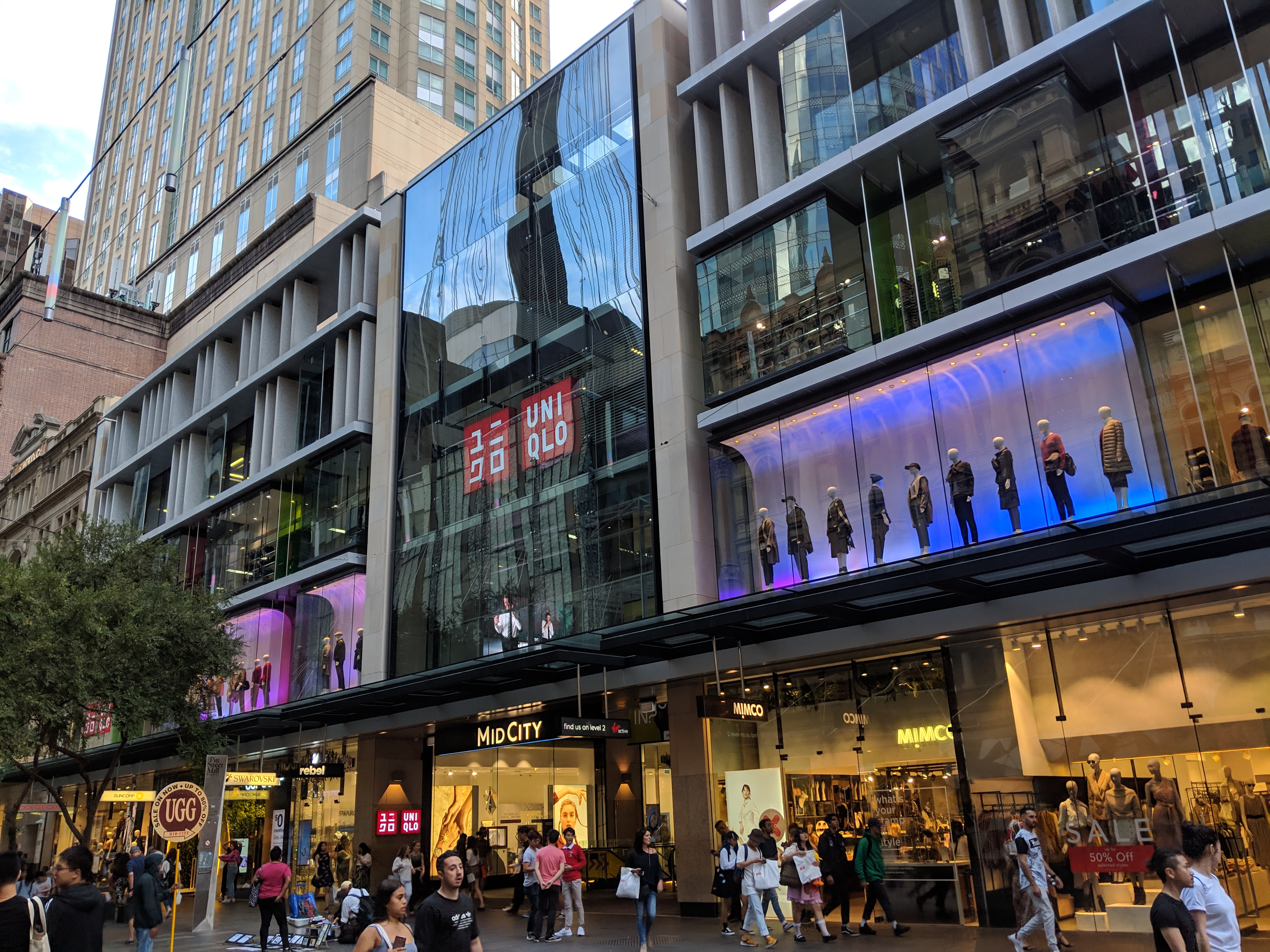
Uniqlo and MidCity

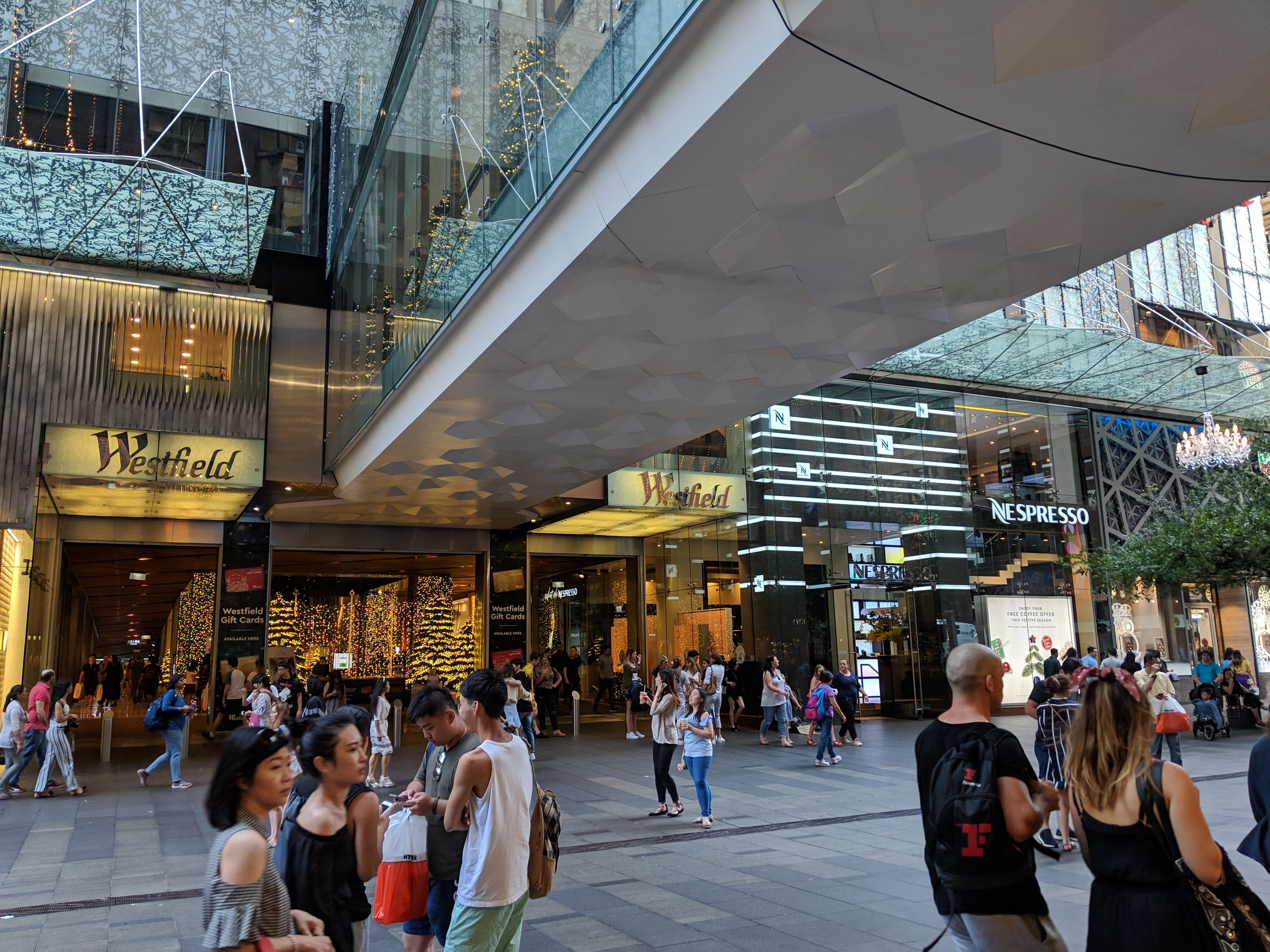
Entrance to Westfield Sydney

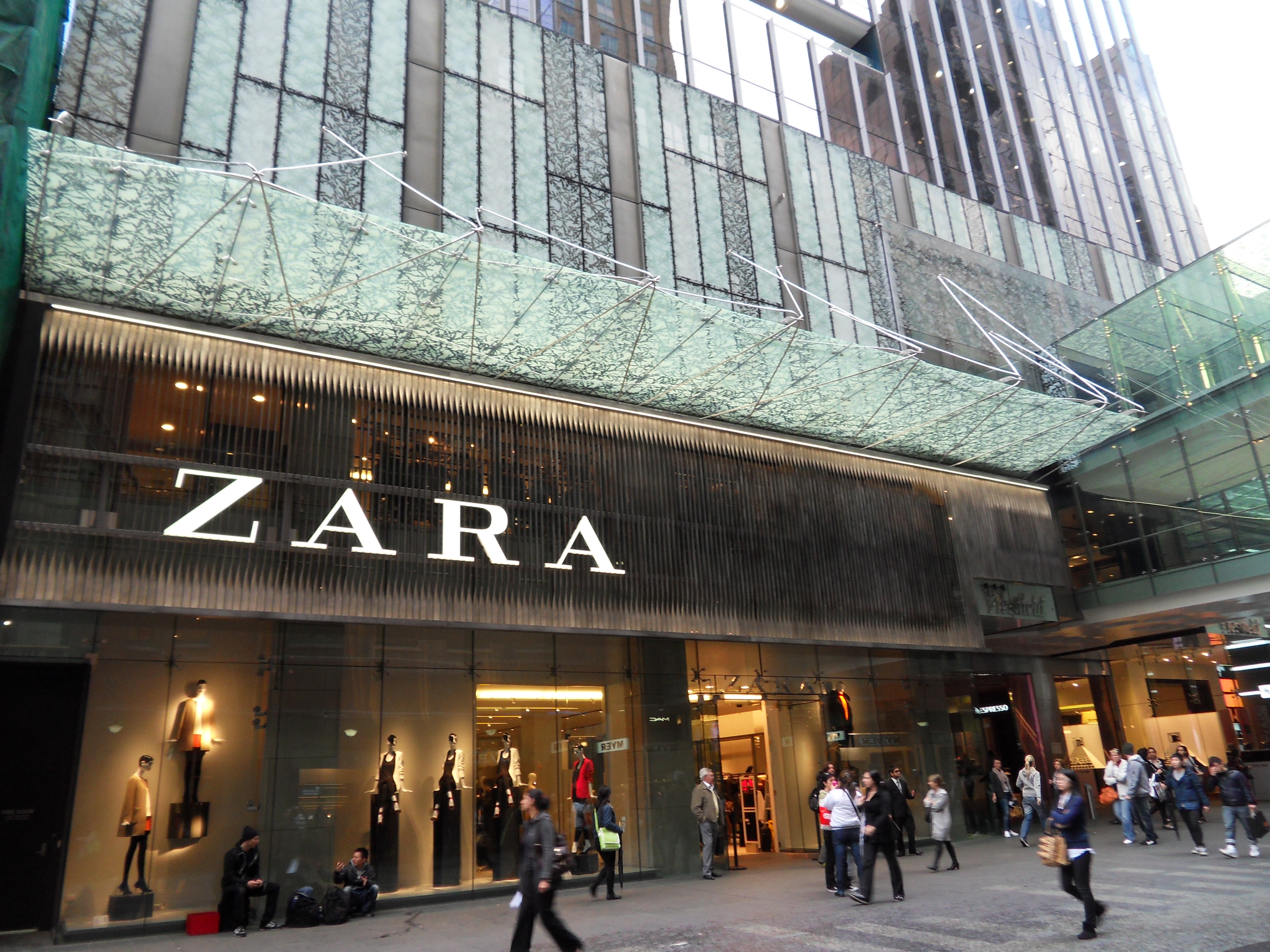
Zara flagship Sydney store

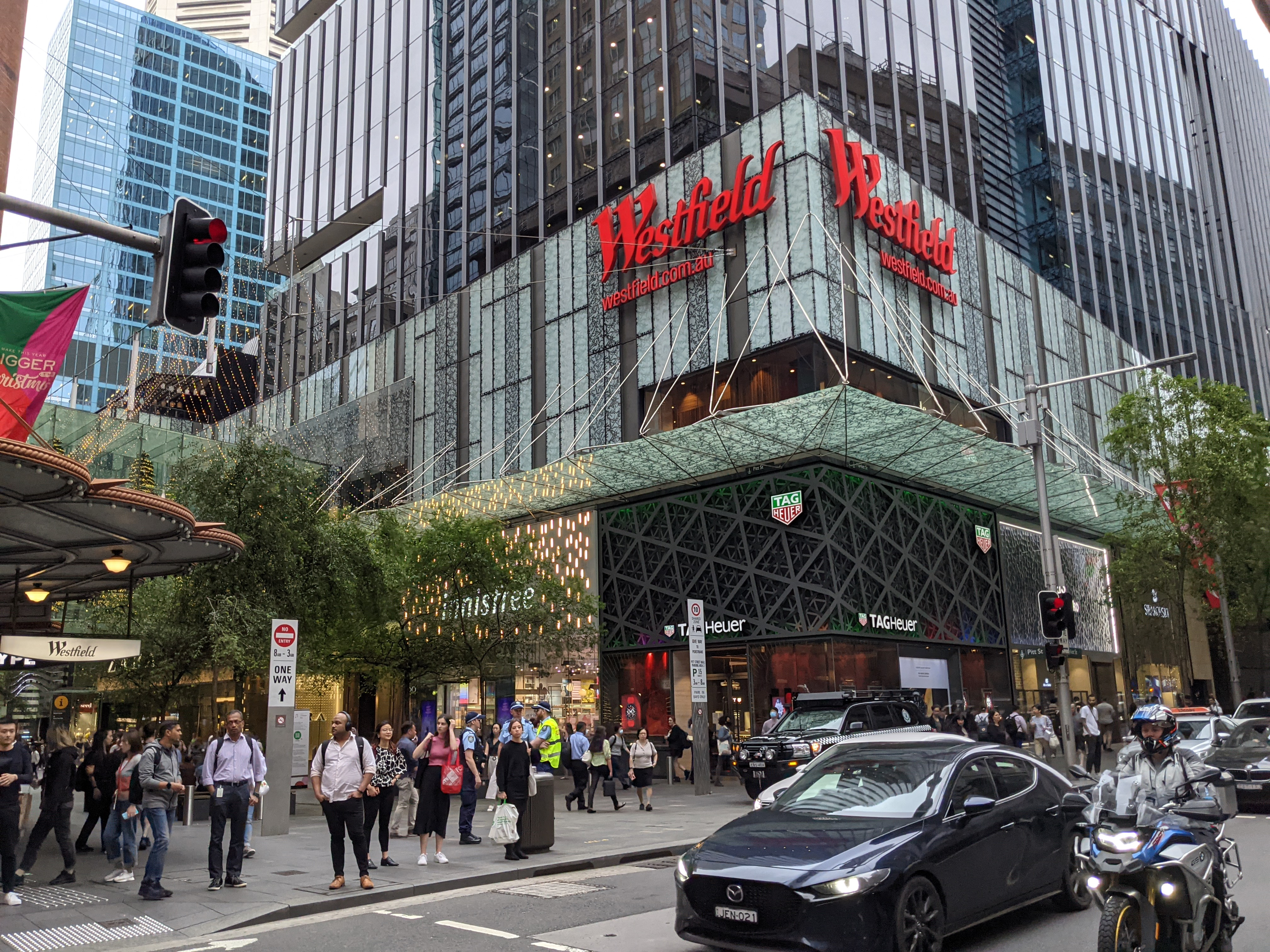
Corner of Market Street and Pitt Street

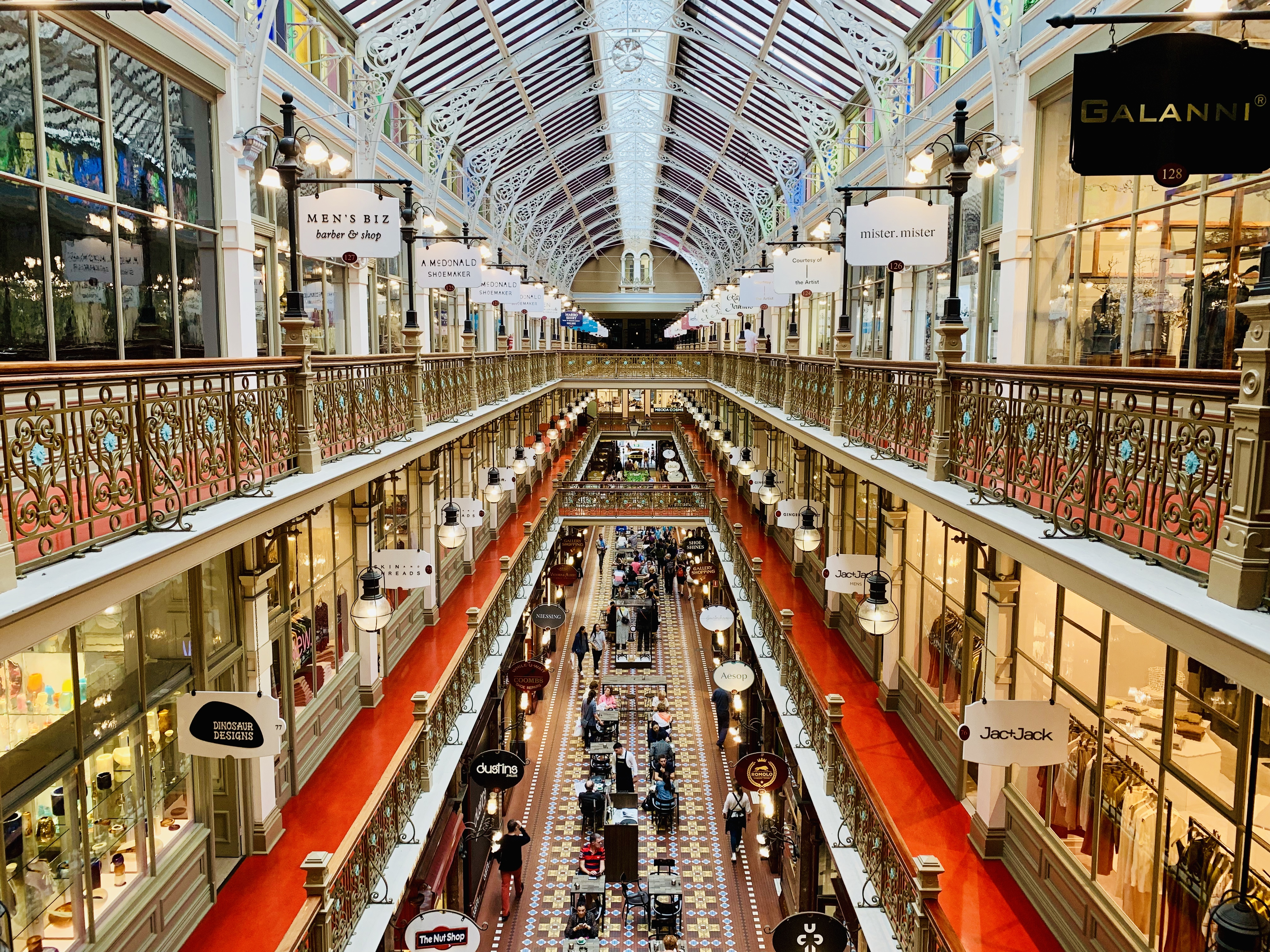
The Strand Arcade

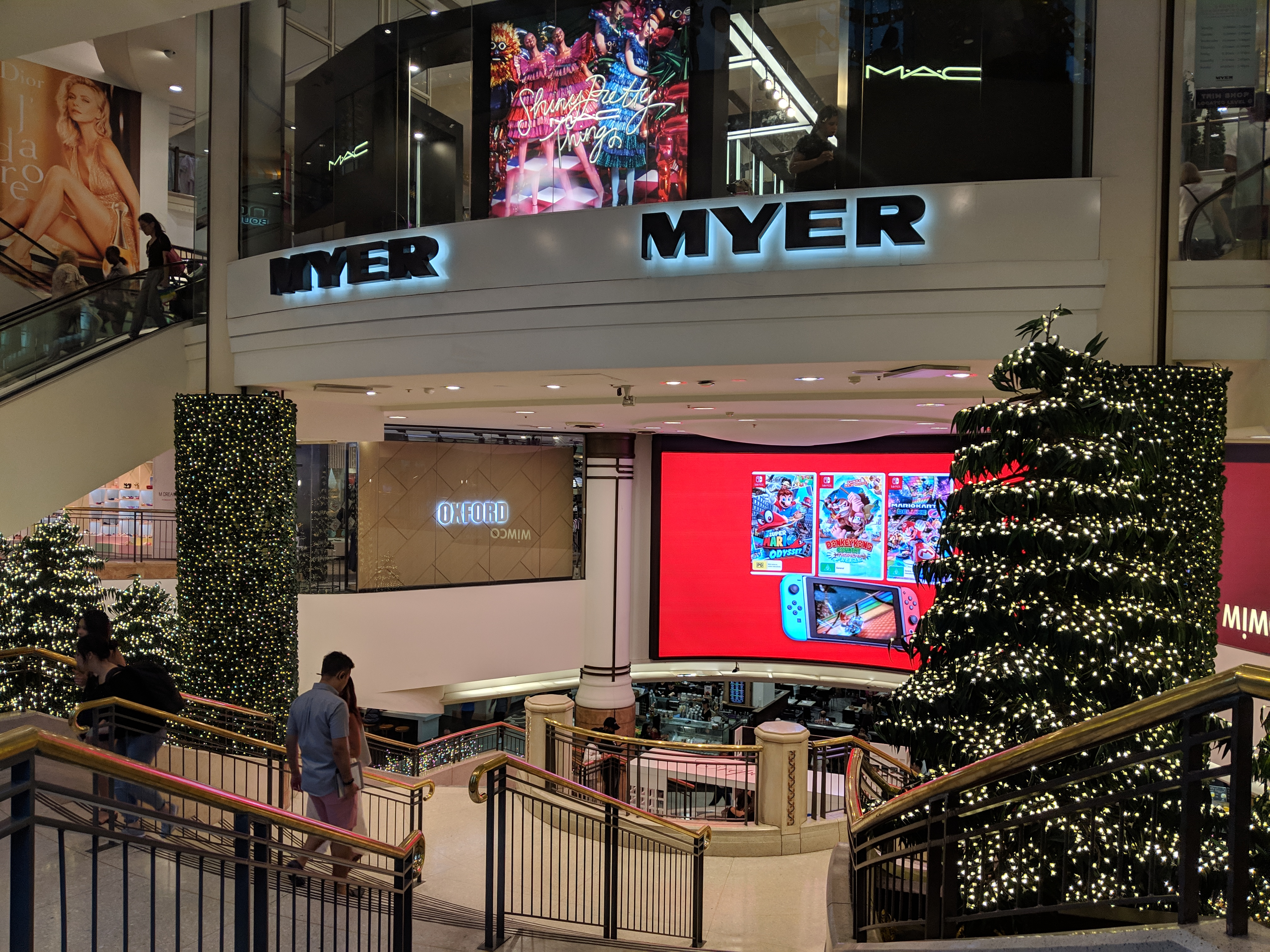
Entrance to Sydney Central Plaza and Myer

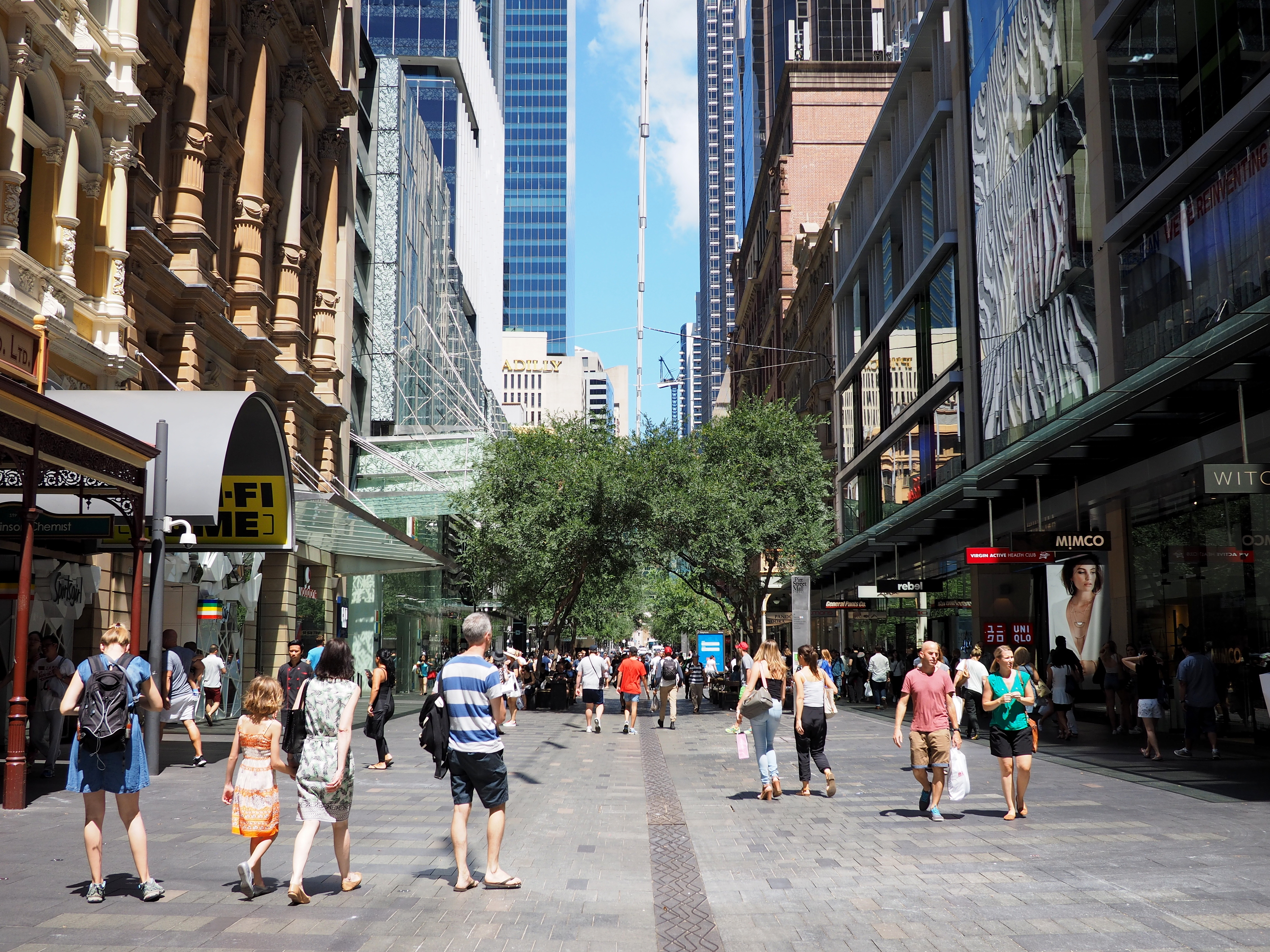
Looking south on Pitt Street Mall in 2016

== See also ==
- List of shopping streets and districts by city
