= The Strand Arcade =

Shopping mall in Sydney, Australia

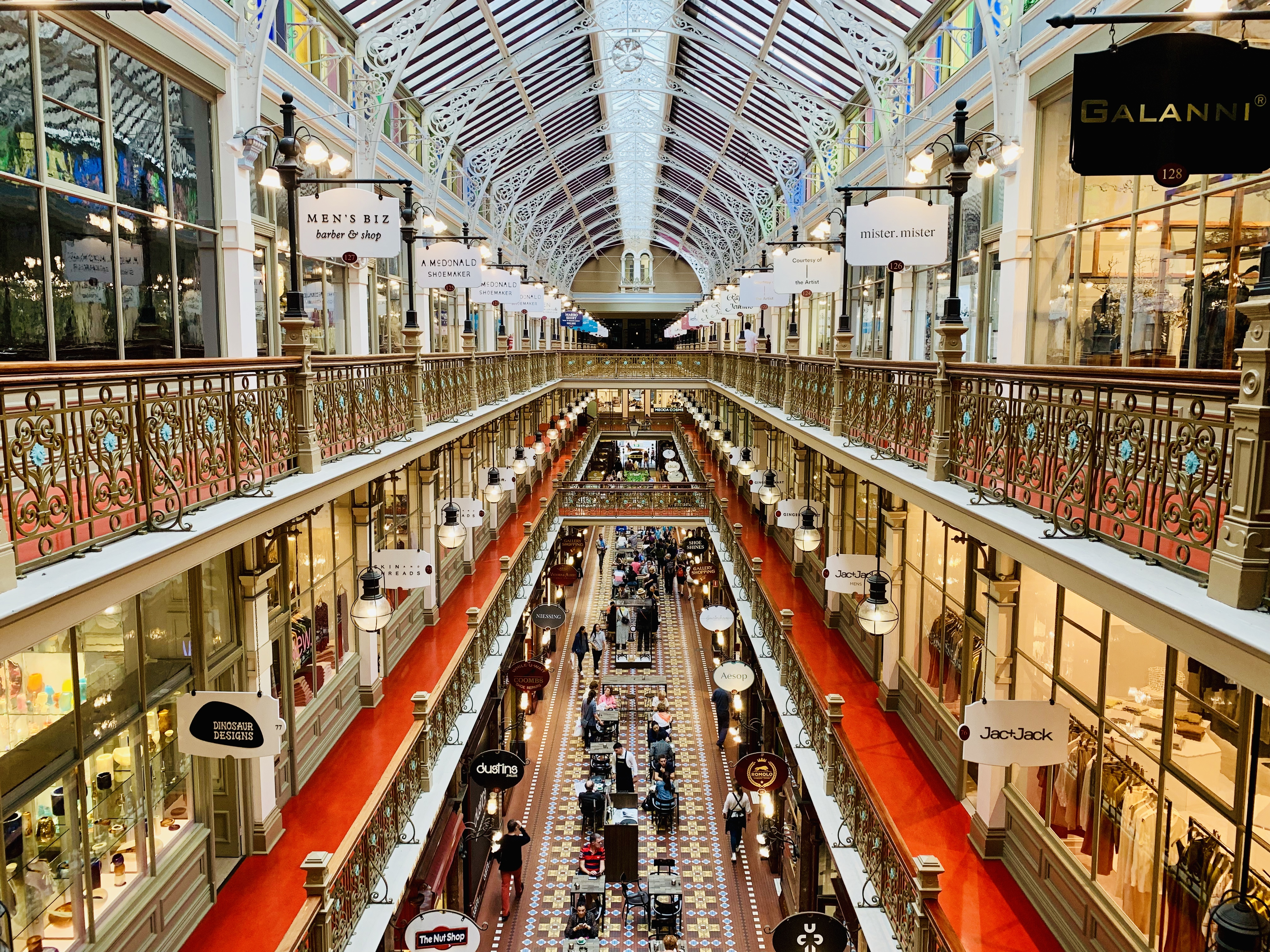
- Interior of The Strand Arcade

- Location within Sydney Location within Australia
- 33.8694°S 151.2076°E
- Location: 195–197 Pitt Street, Sydney central business district, City of Sydney, New South Wales, Australia

History
- Built: 1890–1892

Site notes
- Architects: John B. Spencer; Charles E. Fairfax (assistant)
- Website: www.strandarcade.com.au

New South Wales Heritage Register
- Official name: Strand Arcade
- Type: State heritage (built)
- Designated: 13 December 2011
- Reference no.: 1864
- Type: Shopping/retail complex
- Category: Retail and Wholesale
- Builders: Bignell and Clark (1891); Stephenson & Turner (1976)

Logo of Strand Arcade

The Strand Arcade is a heritage-listed Victorian-style retail arcade located at 195–197 Pitt Street in the heart of the Sydney central business district, between Pitt Street Mall and George Street in the City of Sydney local government area of New South Wales, Australia. It was designed by John B. Spencer, assisted by Charles E. Fairfax; and built from 1890 to 1892 by Bignell and Clark (1891), with renovations completed by Stephenson & Turner (1976). The only remaining arcade of its kind in Sydney, the property was added to the New South Wales State Heritage Register on 13 December 2011.

Being three storeys high, the arcade has the traditional-styled protruding galleries, cedar staircases, tiled floors, cast iron balusters and timber framed shop fronts, under a prominent, tinted glass roof to reduce glare. The arcade contains the preliminary boutiques that characterised the Sydney shopping experience of the 1890s. When the arcade opened in 1892, it was said to be the very latest in shopping centre designs and was described as, "The finest public thoroughfare in the Australian colonies". The arcade has endured two depressions, two World Wars and two major fires. The restored shop fronts are an exact replica of the original internal shopping facades.

== History ==
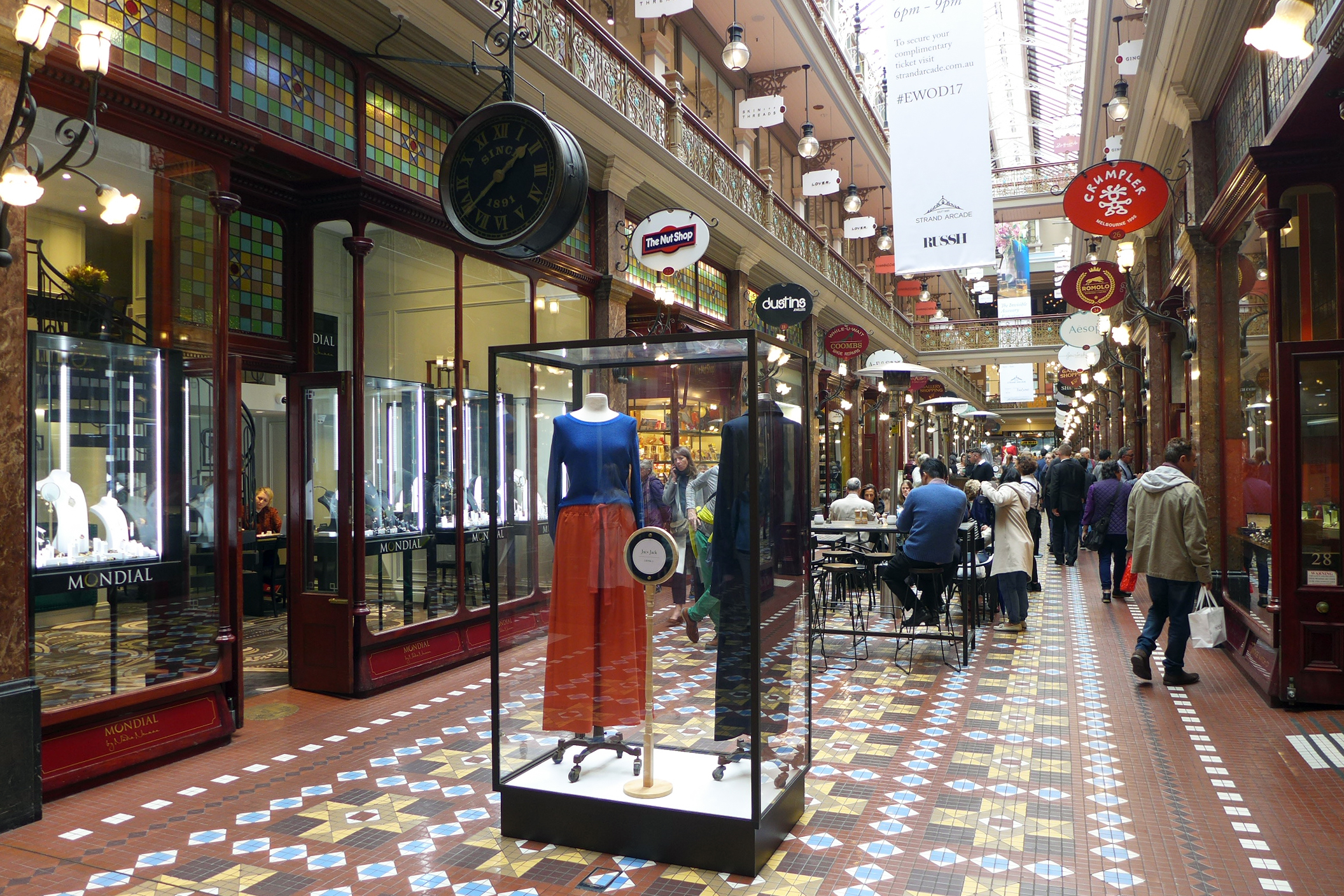
Ground level shops

The Victorian arcades provided much needed shopping frontage and pedestrian space at a time when Sydney had developed streets running south from Circular Quay with relatively few cross streets linking them. The arcades offered pedestrians and goods protection from the harsh sun and heavy rain, as street awnings were not yet in use. Thomas Rowe designed the first two arcades: the Sydney and Royal Arcades in 1881 and 1882, and in 1891 proposed the Imperial Arcade. In 1887–1888, Rowe's former assistant C. A. Harding built the Victoria Arcade.

Designed by English architect John Spencer, The Strand was built in 1890–1892 by Bignell and Clark, and opened on 1 April 1892, as the fifth and last of the arcades built in Sydney in the Victorian era. It is the only one remaining in its original form today. The arcade was to be 104 metres (340 ft) long, and three storeys high. Its lighter neo-classical fluted columns, delicate ironwork and carved balustrades contrasted with Rowe's heavier more stolid designs.

The opening of the arcade was a grand affair with over 600 invitees. It was described as a "well designed modern arcade" with "first class shops". The style was described by the Sydney Mail as an adaptation of several continental designs with the aim to achieve strength and elegance. The richly tiled floor became a favourite fashionable promenade. The Arcade was originally known as the 'City Arcade' and sometimes as 'Arcade Street'. In 1891 it was named after the famous London Street that links the City of London and the City of Westminster. The Strand was London's smartest theatre, hotel and shopping street in the early 1900s.

The arcade became run down as time went by. Restoration work was carried out in the 1970s, but a fire broke out on the morning of 25 May 1976. The arcade was partly destroyed. The ensuing sympathetic restoration by Prudential Assurance in 1976–1978 included the restoration of the two hydraulic lifts, laying of a new tiled floor, the copying of the golden cast-iron balustrades, and reproductions matching of the original hand-carved cedar baluster posts. The restoration work also removed additions, which had spoiled the original design. Several fires caused considerable damage, especially that of May 1976, which damaged the George Street end especially.

The arcade continues as a first class shopping arcade with long term tenants. The Nut Shop, which still operates today, opened in 1939.

The Strand Arcade celebrated its 125th anniversary in August 2016 with a series of events and offers for customers. Retailers hosted free tasters, pop-up stalls, designer appearances and The Balvenie whisky tasting station. The events recreate the energy of a majestic Victorian arcade over a three-day period, with a range of special deals, demonstrations. The complex will also launch the seventh volume of its "1891" magazine this week.

== Description ==
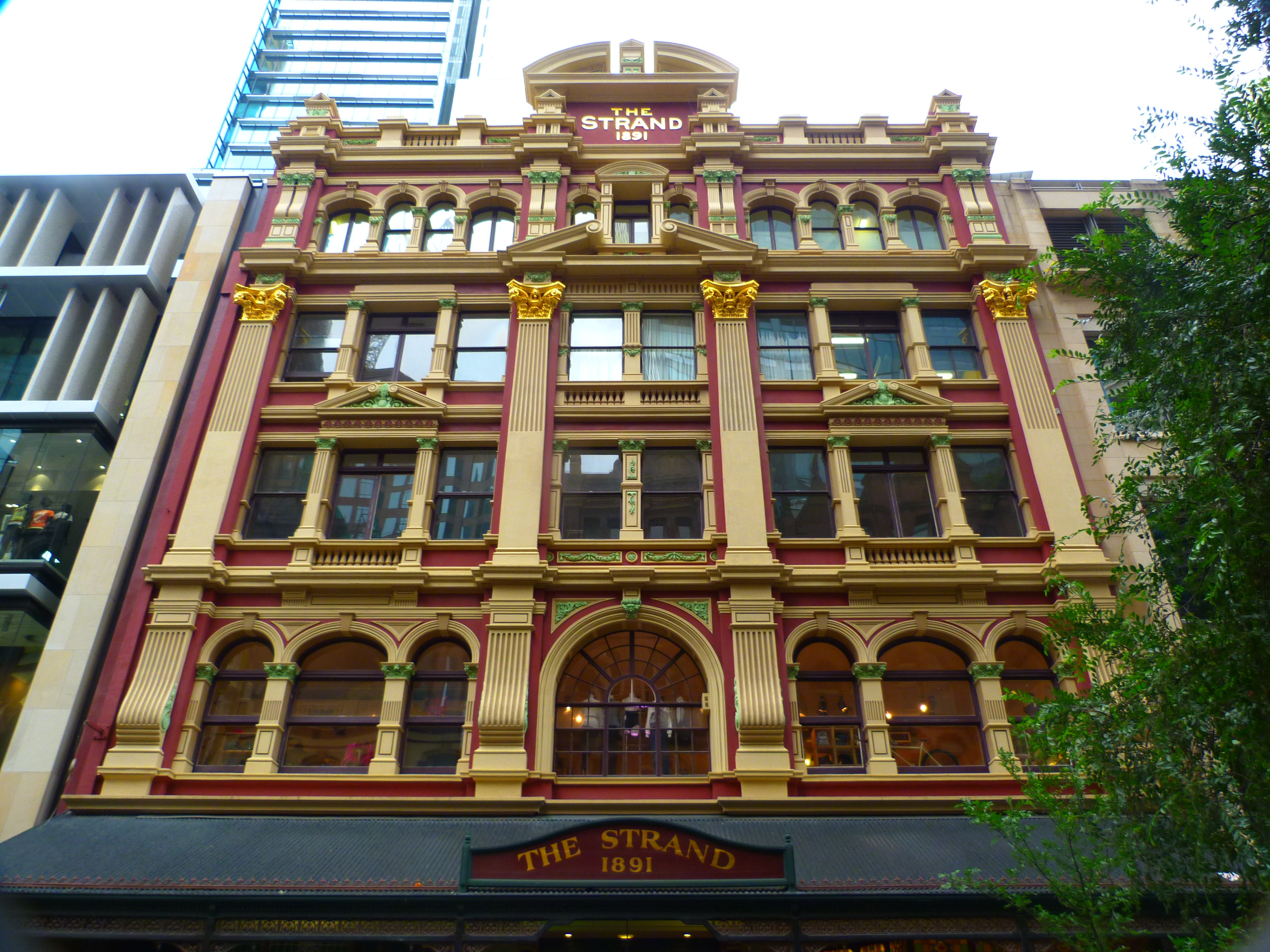
Pitt Street facade

The arcade is the longest of the Victorian arcades extending 104 metres (340 ft) between George and Pitt Streets with a basement originally containing shops reached by stairs in the ground floor concourse. The Strand has three storeys - consisting of an enclosed arcade on each side of a concourse served by cantilevered access galleries, with five storey connections at both street fronts. Bridges across the concourse link the upper floors. The glass roof was especially designed to reduce glare for the photographic studios on the upper levels. Constructed of stuccoed brick with cast iron roof structure, cantilevered galleries, cast iron and carved balustrades, and timber framed shopfronts, the arcade looks like a row of Victorian terraces with cast -iron balconies. Neo-classical fluted cast iron columns, and elaborate traceries of ornamental lacework cast delicate shadows in the sunlight from the vast glass panelled roof.

The concourse lighting consisted of chandeliers suspended from the crown of the roof trusses and lit by fifty gas and fifty electric lamps in each. Some of the light fittings, which still exist, were designed by the architect.

Following the 1976 and 1980 fires, large portions of the interior were reconstructed to match the original in appearance, with an upgrade of materials for fireproofing concealed under traditional materials. Some of the original fabric remains as fragments. The two suspended type hydraulic lifts were repaired, the golden cast iron balustrades were copied and the cedar baluster posts were made to match the handcrafted originals. Tessellated tiles, stained glass and cedar stairs and shopfronts were adapted from the original designs.

=== Condition ===
As at 23 August 2004, good physical condition following restoration works in 1976, and 1980.

The arcade is still used as a retail pedestrian precinct. The Pitt Street end retains its original walls, doors and fittings. The 1976–1977 restoration copied original designs. Cast iron balustrades and cedar balusters were handcrafted after original designs, and the two hydraulic lifts were restored.

=== Modifications and dates ===
- 1976, 1980

== Heritage listing ==
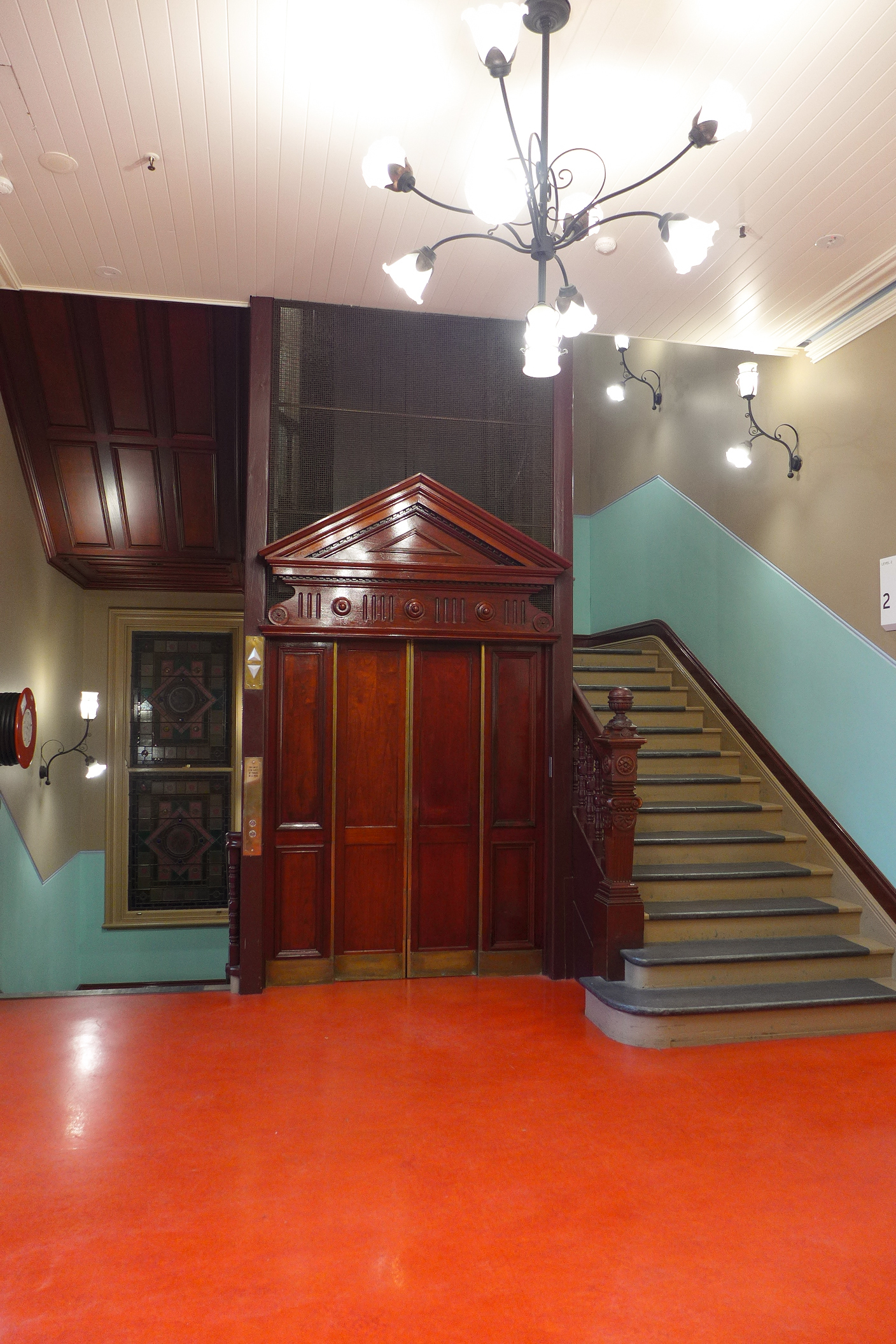
Lifts in original condition

As at 23 August 2004, Designed in restrained Classic revival style, it is probably the finest of Sydney's shopping arcades built in the Victorian period, and the only one that has not been radically altered. It is the only surviving pre-1960 arcade. It is a rare building type within Sydney and Australia. The best known work of Spencer and Fairfax, it adapted several favourite continental designs, the object being to achieve strength with elegance.

It reflects the importance of Pitt Street and George Street as the premier retail precinct in Sydney. It is a significant component in the late Victorian/early twentieth century streetscape of George and Pitt Streets and contributes to one of the most substantial groups of late Victorian commercial buildings in the CBD. It has the potential to continue in its current use following several restorations after fires, the most recent in 1976 and 1980.

The Strand Arcade is one of Sydney's best known and loved buildings and is significant for the continuity of occupation and uses. The building contains significant examples of late nineteenth-century building construction including the lift well structure, cast iron structural framing, cast iron roof trusses, coke breeze floors and tessellated ceramic tiles.

Strand Arcade was listed on the New South Wales State Heritage Register on 13 December 2011 having satisfied the following criteria.

The place is important in demonstrating the course, or pattern, of cultural or natural history in New South Wales.

The Strand is the only remaining example of Victorian arcade construction and style in Sydney, linking Victorian and modern Sydney retail history. Although over 100 years old it retains a light and airy atmosphere in keeping with modern usage. The pedestrian-only precinct planning principle, and its design reveals European influences interpreted in an Australian context. The arcade was considered a fashionable promenade. Over 600 people were invited to its opening in 1892 and very few failed to attend this event.

The place has a strong or special association with a person, or group of persons, of importance of cultural or natural history of New South Wales's history.

The Strand Arcade is associated with J. B. Spencer & G. E. Fairfax, European architectural design influences in Australia and long-term tenants such as Coombs Bootmakers, Margo Richards Antiques (25 years) and the engraving kiosk (42 years).

The place is important in demonstrating aesthetic characteristics and/or a high degree of creative or technical achievement in New South Wales.

The light and airy feeling was considered remarkable in contrast to Rowe's heavier designs in the context of the Sydney Victorian arcades.

The Strand retains this aesthetic quality through the ornamental lacework panels, fluted columns and natural light. The Strand Arcade was considered the finest of the Victorian arcades in Sydney at the time of construction and still retains a reputation for good design. The balustrades, brackets and roof construction showed great skill and workmanship. Much attention was given to detail: light fittings were designed by the architect, even the sanitary appliances were given much attention.

The Strand Arcade is a fine example of the work of J. B. Spencer & Fairfax 1891–2.

The place has a strong or special association with a particular community or cultural group in New South Wales for social, cultural or spiritual reasons.

The Strand Arcade has been promoted as a tourist visit since its construction. It is valued by Sydneysiders and visitors as a beautiful arcade with high quality shops.

The place has potential to yield information that will contribute to an understanding of the cultural or natural history of New South Wales.

The Strand was the longest of the Victorian arcades. The lighting for the concourse consisted of chandeliers, suspended from the crown of roof trusses, and each containing fifty gas and fifty electric lamps. The glass roof panels were tinted to filter the light for the upper storey photographic studios. The conservation work undertaken in the late 20th century can provide physical evidence of heritage building conservation philosophy and practice of the time.

The place possesses uncommon, rare or endangered aspects of the cultural or natural history of New South Wales.

The Strand was the finest, longest and is now the only surviving intact Victorian arcade in Sydney.

The place is important in demonstrating the principal characteristics of a class of cultural or natural places/environments in New South Wales.

One of five Victorian arcades in Sydney built to provide a pedestrian precinct and to protect goods and pedestrians from weather. The conservation works following fires in 1976 and 1980 are representative of conservation practice of the period.

== In popular culture ==
Part of the video for singer David Bowie's 1983 single "Let's Dance", took place in The Strand Arcade. The TV series JAG in the two-part episode "Boomerang" features a scene where the main character, Harmon Rabb Jr. (played by David James Elliott), visits a shop to obtain the robe, wig, and other items needed to appear in an Australian courtroom.
