= City Cross Arcade =

Coordinates: 34°55′27″S 138°36′05″E

City Cross
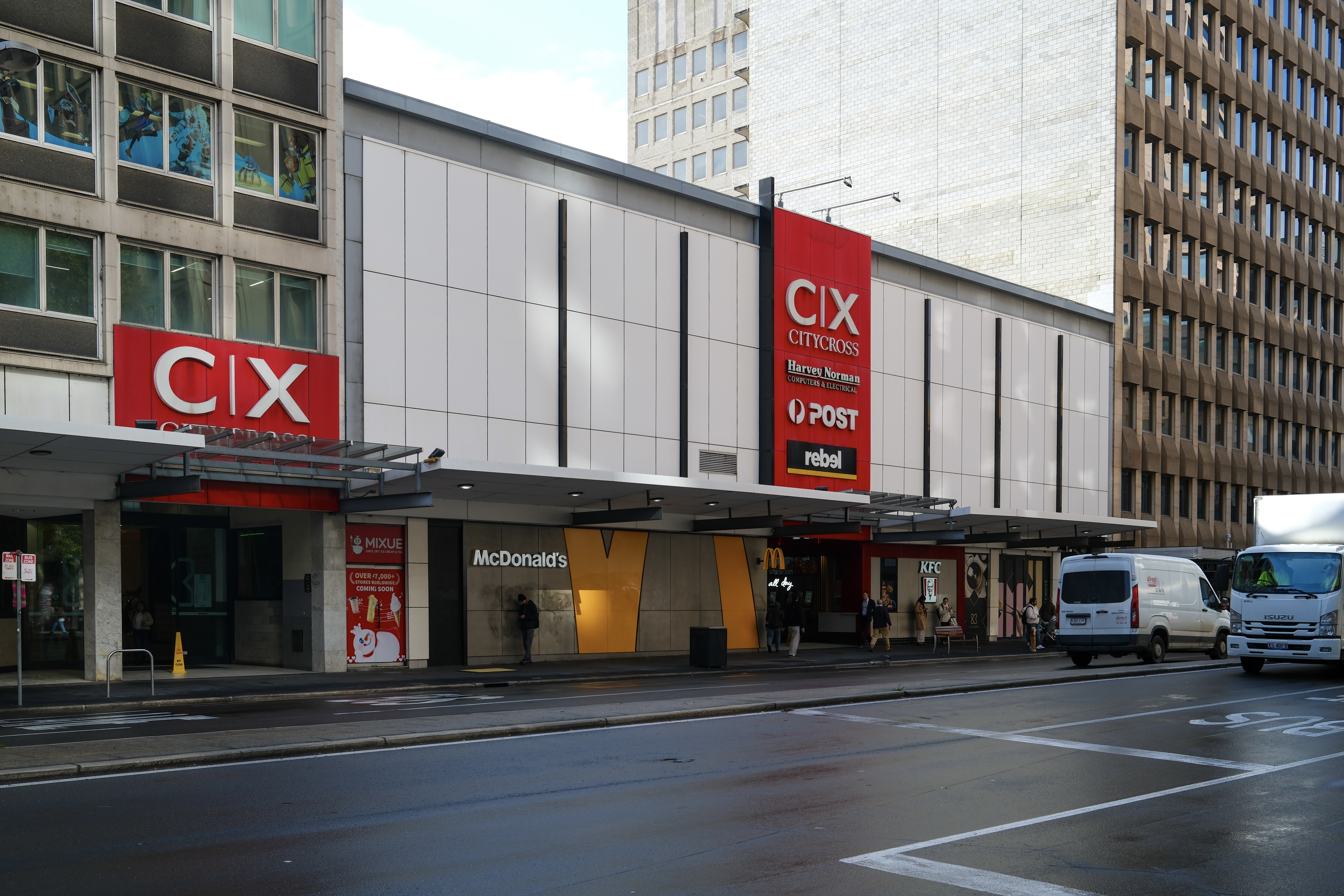
- City Cross Arcade entrance on Grenfell Street
- Location: 31-39 Rundle Mall, Adelaide, South Australia
- Opened: 1984; 42 years ago
- Num. of stores: 36
- Floors: 2
- Website: www.citycross.com.au

City Cross is a two-level shopping complex located on 31-39 Rundle Mall Adelaide South Australia with entrances to Grenfell Street, James Place and Gawler Place. The centre is owned by the Makris Group, who purchased the site in 2001 after it was placed up for sale by the previous owners, Hawaiian Investments, in 2000. The main three anchors are Forever New, Harvey Norman and Rebel Sports. The complex also features smaller retailers and a large food court including KFC, Balfours, Subway, Oporto, Charlesworth Nuts, Bean Bar and many other food outlets. Amongst the smaller stores are Watch Doctor and Archer and Holland. Australia Post Adelaide Rundle Mall Post Shop is also located on the first floor.

The site was redeveloped at a cost of $6m in 1984, almost doubling the number of shops in the center by expanding on to the former sites of two local buildings – the Mutual Life Chambers and the Widow's Fund building. Among the suggestions for the site prior to the completion of the 1984 redevelopment was the construction of a Grenfell Street underpass, although these plans never eventuated. Another, smaller, redevelopment occurred in 1996 when the centre was under the management of Hawaiian Investments.

In April, 2003 a $100m redevelopment of the site was announced, to be completed in three stages. The first stage of the redevelopment, completed at a cost of $25m, was opened by Premier Mike Rann on 22 November 2005, and effectively doubled the retail area of the centre. Shortly before the completion of the first stage, Amart All Sports announced that they would be moving into the new premises, joining Harvey Norman who had previously announced their tenancy in the expanded site. The second stage was to include a 450 car parking station above the site, with a planned third stage to incorporate a 10-storey office tower.
