= Myer Centre =

Myer Centre may refer to various shopping centres in Australia:

- Myer Centre, Adelaide
- Uptown, Brisbane, formerly The Myer Centre
