= Rundle Mall =

Pedestrianised shopping precinct in Adelaide, South Australia

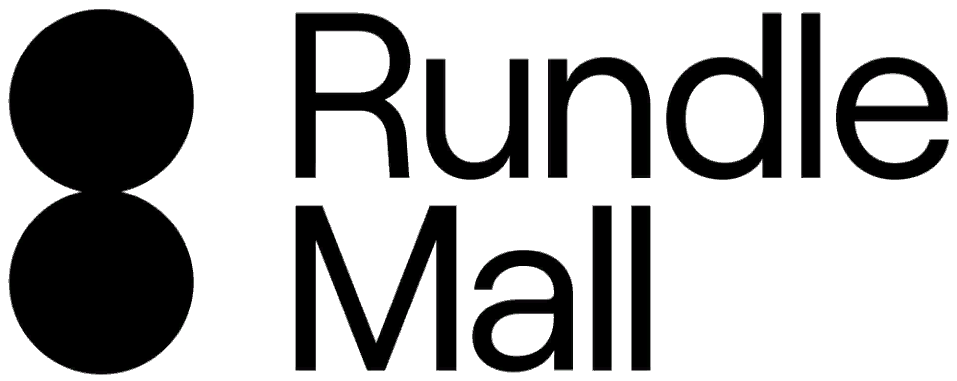

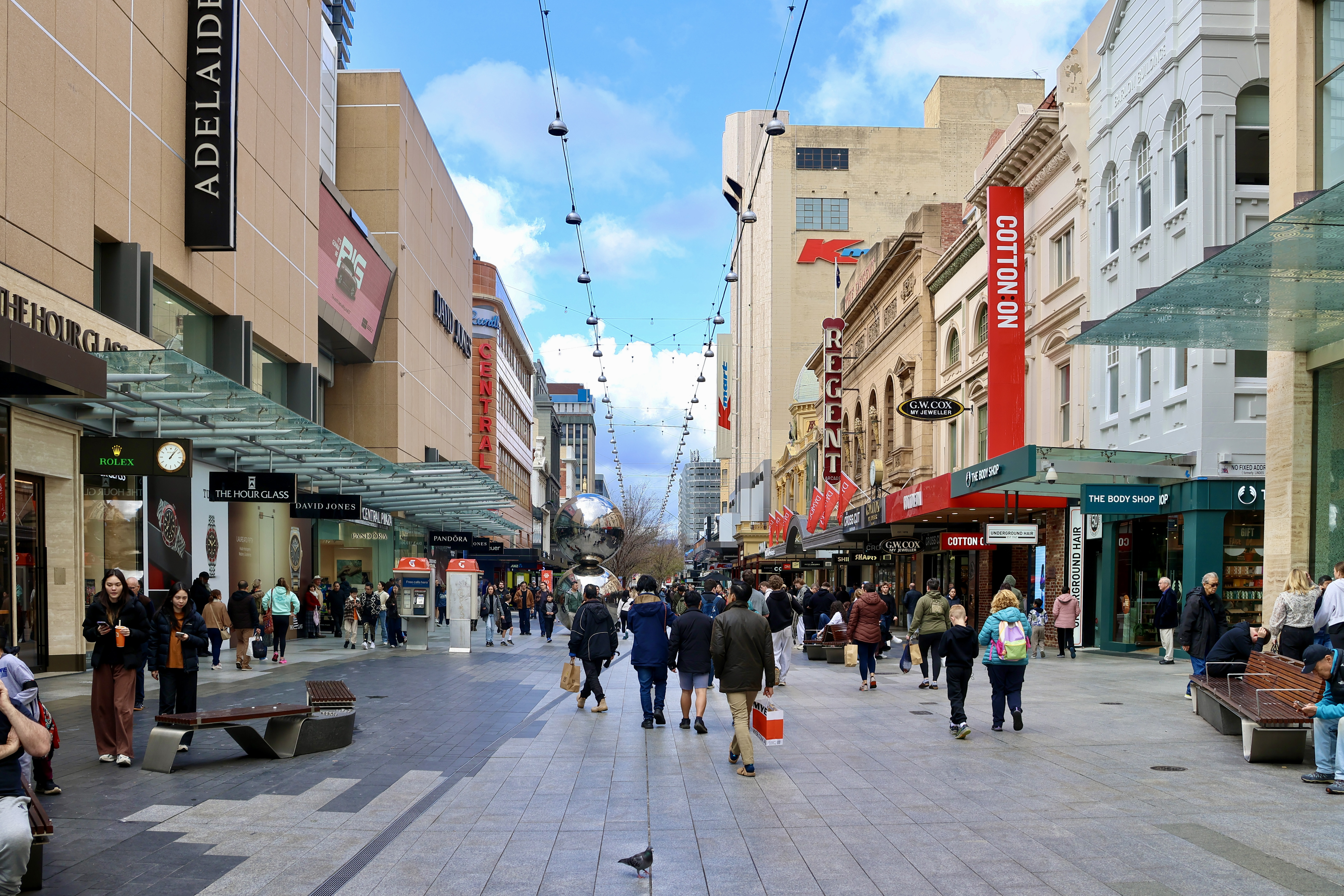
- Rundle Mall looking east, July 2026
- Location: Adelaide, South Australia, Australia
- Coordinates: 34.92290278°S 138.601875°E
- Opened: 1 September 1976
- Previous names: Rundle Street Mall (1976)
- Developer: Adelaide City Council
- Manager: Adelaide Economic Development Agency
- Owner: City of Adelaide
- Architect: Ian Hannaford Architects
- Public transit: Rundle Mall Tram Stop, Adelaide Metro
- Website: www.rundlemall.com

Rundle Mall is a pedestrian shopping precinct in the city centre of Adelaide, South Australia. It stretches from King William Street to Pulteney Street in the western half of Rundle Street. The name of the street was chosen back in 1837 in honour of John Rundle who was a British member of parliament and director of the South Australian Company. Already by the 1870s, drapers, tailors and shoemakers traded here at the western end of the street. In 1972, Premier Don Dunstan suggested to the Adelaide City Council the idea of closing off the area for traffic. Ian Hannaford was appointed as the architect of Rundle Mall in 1975 and the pedestrian mall was officially opened by Dunstan on 1 September 1976.

It includes department stores, shopping arcades and historic buildings such as Beehive Corner and the former Regent Theatre. Myer Centre was opened in 1991 and included the Dazzeland, an indoor amusement park which operated till 1998. Rundle Place opened in 2013 in the same year when the large scale renovation of the mall began. The precinct also serves as a venue for public performances, including during the Adelaide Fringe.

== History ==
=== Rundle Street and pedestrianisation (1837–1976) ===
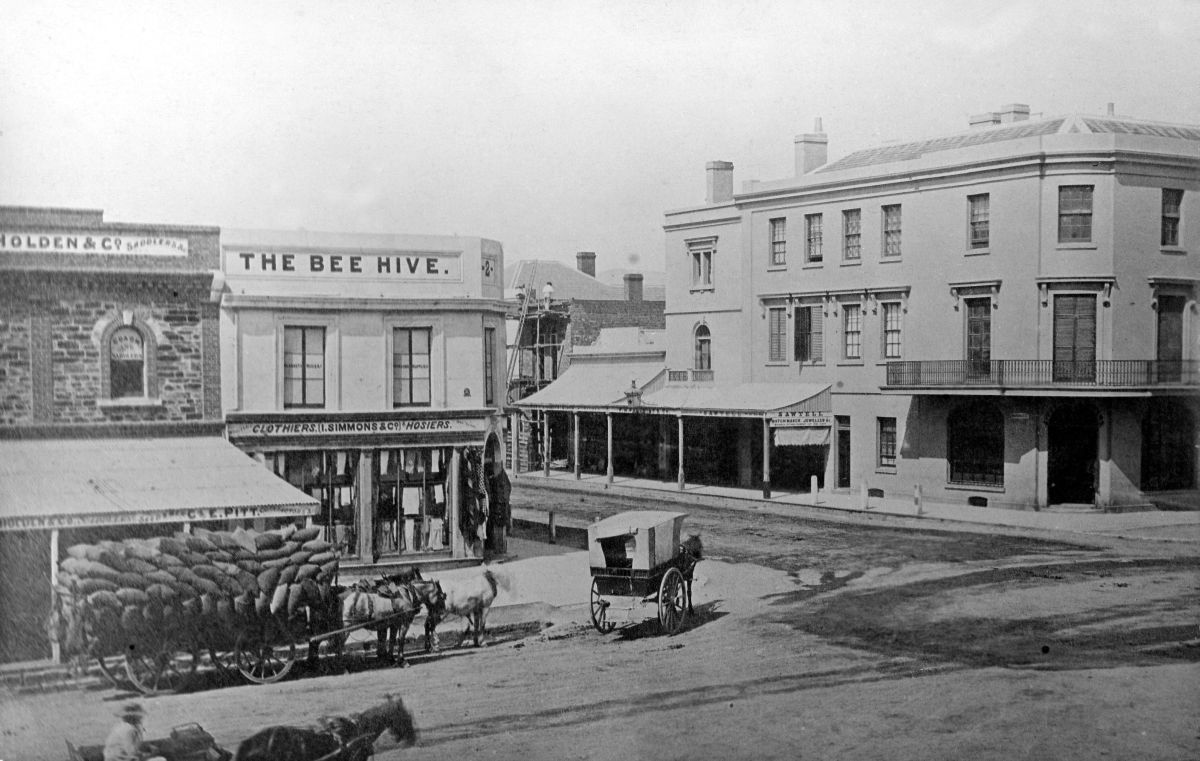
The corner of Rundle and King William streets, with Beehive Corner (left) and Waterhouse Chambers (right) in 1866.

Rundle Street looking west from the Richmond Hotel on 31 March 1938. A bus, cars and pedestrians are visible.

The Street Naming Committee selected the names of the streets that were surveyed according to the plan of William Light on 23 May 1837. These names appeared in the government gazette on 3 June. Rundle Street, after which Rundle Mall is named, was named after John Rundle, who was an English Member of Parliament and a director of the South Australian Company. The drapers, tailors and shoe makers used to trade at the western end of Rundle Street in the 1870s.

Hugh Bubb, the city planner, came up with an underground shopping tunnel from the Adelaide Central Market to Rundle Street through Stock Exchange Plaza, inspired by a project in Montreal, in July 1969. However, the plan never materialised. In November 1972, Premier Don Dunstan requested the Adelaide City Council to consider closing Rundle Street for motor vehicle traffic between King William Street and Pulteney Street. The plan formed part of the government's campaign for the 1973 election. Lord Mayor Robert Clampett made efforts to get the council's support, considering the concerns raised by the retailers over pedestrianisation of the street.

On 20 February 1974, Transport Minister Geoff Virgo informed the House of Assembly that all three parties had resolved to move directly to design and implementation without having a trial closure. It was requested that the council authorise the feasibility consultants P. G. Pak Poy & Associates for further design and scheduling work. Retail Traders Association wanted short-stay parking and better public transport facilities. Preliminary plans were approved by the steering committee in June, and the City of Adelaide Development Committee also approved the plan in principle on 25 June. In September, the council chose the former Foy & Gibson site at Rundle and Pulteney streets as the preferred site for providing around 800 short-stay parking spots.

Architect Ian Hannaford was appointed by the council in February 1975. Design was reviewed by the Development Committee, and the parking proposal was approved in May provided that retail spaces and flexibility for future changes were considered. Construction started in 1975, and the first brick of about 580,000 bricks were laid in January 1976. March 1976 City Plan mentioned this precinct as the Rundle Mall Precinct.

=== Opening and retail development (1976–2000) ===
The area of the western portion of Rundle Street became Rundle Street Mall on 1 September 1976 through the proclamation through the Rundle Street Mall Act 1975. The opening of the mall took place in front of an estimated attendance of 10,000 people. It was opened officially by Dunstan who poured out champagne from the Gawler Place fountain while the South Australia Police Band provided musical accompaniment at the event. During the period of pedestrianisation of the area, John Martin's increased its retail spaces while Myer and David Jones refurbished theirs. The name change to Rundle Mall from Rundle Street Mall was made via the Rundle Street Mall Act Amendment Act 1976 which was signed into law by Governor Mark Oliphant on 18 November.

The visit of Queen Elizabeth II and Prince Philip to the mall occurred on 23 March 1977. The Rundle Mall carpark, constructed as a demountable building, was officially opened on 30 June of the same year by the Lord Mayor John Roche. Approximately 25,000 people turned up on 5 July 1984 to watch the performance of Culture Club whose lead vocalist Boy George sang on the pedestrian bridge between the Hotel Richmond and the Renaissance building.

The Myer Centre opened in June 1991 and attracted about 200,000 people at its opening. The project. worth A$570 million, included a six-story Myer department store, specialty stores, and Dazzeland, which is an indoor amusement centre occupying the top two stories. It featured attractions such as the Jazz Junction roller coaster, dodgems, a mini train, and arcades. The 1992 City Plan noted a study conducted by the council and state government with the intention of raising activity levels in the mall.

In the mid-1990s, the council upgraded the mall, introducing new paving, lighting, seating, and planting. The size of Dazzeland was scaled down to one floor before Myer Centre management announced Dazzeland's closure in 1997. It closed in 1998, and its attractions and equipment were put up for auction. John Martin's store was demolished in March 1998. Shania Twain staged a performance using the pedestrian bridge while Tony Bennett did a show in Myer Centre in 1999. The Adelaide Central Plaza was constructed on the site of John Martin's store in August 2000. Outdoor escalators continued operating until 2000.

=== Mall upgrades and redevelopment (2003–present) ===
Kostas Makris, a property developer, announced plans in April 2003 for the $100 million redevelopment of the City Cross Arcade shopping centre at Rundle Mall, which was to take place in three stages, the first of which was to feature a 2,000 m^{2} (22,000 sq ft) Harvey Norman store for computer and entertainment goods.

Rundle Place, the proposed site of a Coles supermarket, under construction at 77–91 Rundle Mall, on 19 February 2012

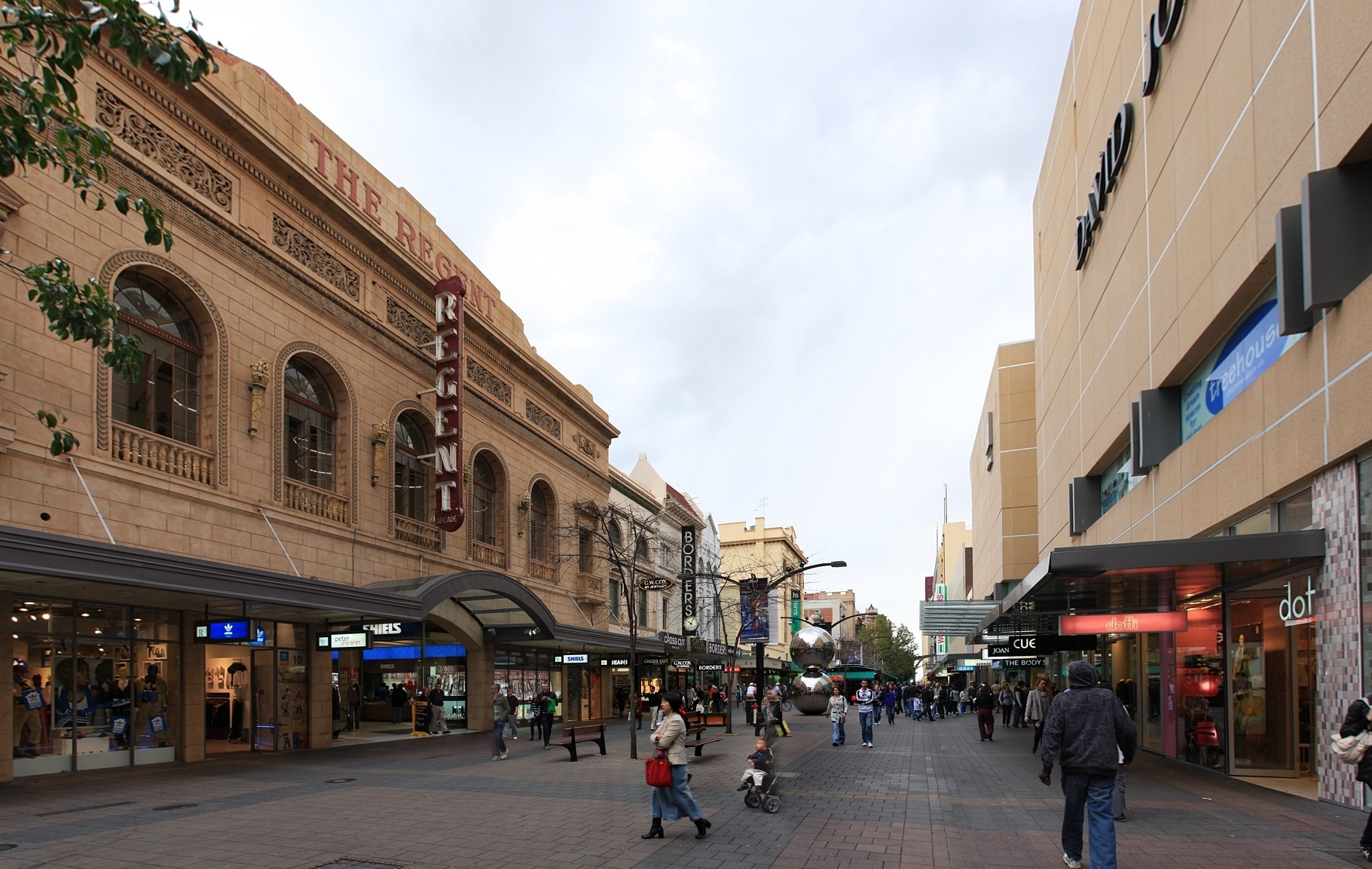
Rundle Mall, looking west in May 2009

In November 2011, the council approved the Rundle Mall Master Plan, which was produced in collaboration with the Rundle Mall Management Authority, and provided $30 million for stage one. Stage one commenced at the King William Street end in February 2013.

Rundle Place opened its doors on 26 March 2013. The $385 million project was designed to house 85 specialty stores over four floors. Harris Scarfe's largest store at 10,000 m^{2} (110,000 sq ft) was one of the earliest stores to open. The renovated mall opened its first sections in November 2013, and the major renovations were revealed in October 2014. The lighting renovation was completed in October 2015.

On 1 September 2016, the Lord Mayor Martin Haese and Rundle Mall Management Authority general manager Amanda Grocock marked the 40th birthday of the mall. Among the announcements made at the time were a $7.85 million renovation of Gawler Place and a $50 million tramline expansion down North Terrace.

By 2017, many areas in the top floors of the Myer Centre were already vacated, escalators linking to the fourth and fifth floors were no longer operational, and Slingsby Theatre Company took up residence in what used to be called Dazzeland. Gawler Place was revitalised by the council in 2019 and 2020.

The State Commission Assessment Panel approved certain reserved matters and conditions to the plan proposed by Precision Group for partial demolition of a four-story commercial structure and erecting a tower building at Adelaide Central Plaza located at 100 Rundle Mall on the 3 September 2025. The panel left architectural aspects, materials, landscape features, stormwater management and vehicular access to be assessed further prior to issuing development approval.

In advance of its 50th anniversary in September 2026, executive manager Andrew White cited 52 million visits, $1.5 billion revenue, more than 1,000 tenants, and a sub-three per cent vacancy rate. He noted that Black Friday had supplanted Boxing Day as the busiest shopping day of the year. Redevelopment of James Place and installation of a precinct-wide audio system were among other announcements made.

== Management ==
=== Rundle Mall Committee ===
The Rundle Street Mall Act 1975 established the Rundle Street Mall Committee. The committee was renamed to Rundle Mall Committee after an amendment that came into effect in 1976 to allow the council to allocate powers to the committee through by-laws. The City of Adelaide (Rundle Mall) Amendment Act 1999 repealed the 1975 Act and handed over the properties of the committee to the council.

=== Rundle Mall Management Authority ===
The Rundle Mall Management Authority was established as a subsidiary of the council in October 2008. Its roles included planning, marketing, liaising with retailers and landowners, and providing advice to the council on matters relating to infrastructure. This authority was supported by the precinct levy, which was collected by the council separately from other rates on rateable land in the precinct.

=== Adelaide Economic Development Agency ===
The council, in October 2020, made a decision to widen the scope of work of the agency and rename it the Adelaide Economic Development Agency (AEDA). It came into effect in January 2021, being responsible for economic development and promotion in the city centre and North Adelaide. AEDA continued its operations in respect of promotion of Rundle Mall and advice to the council on maintenance and upgrading. As per the amended charter, the proceeds of the Rundle Mall Separate Rate are to be utilised only for Rundle Mall through AEDA business plan.

== Layout and infrastructure ==
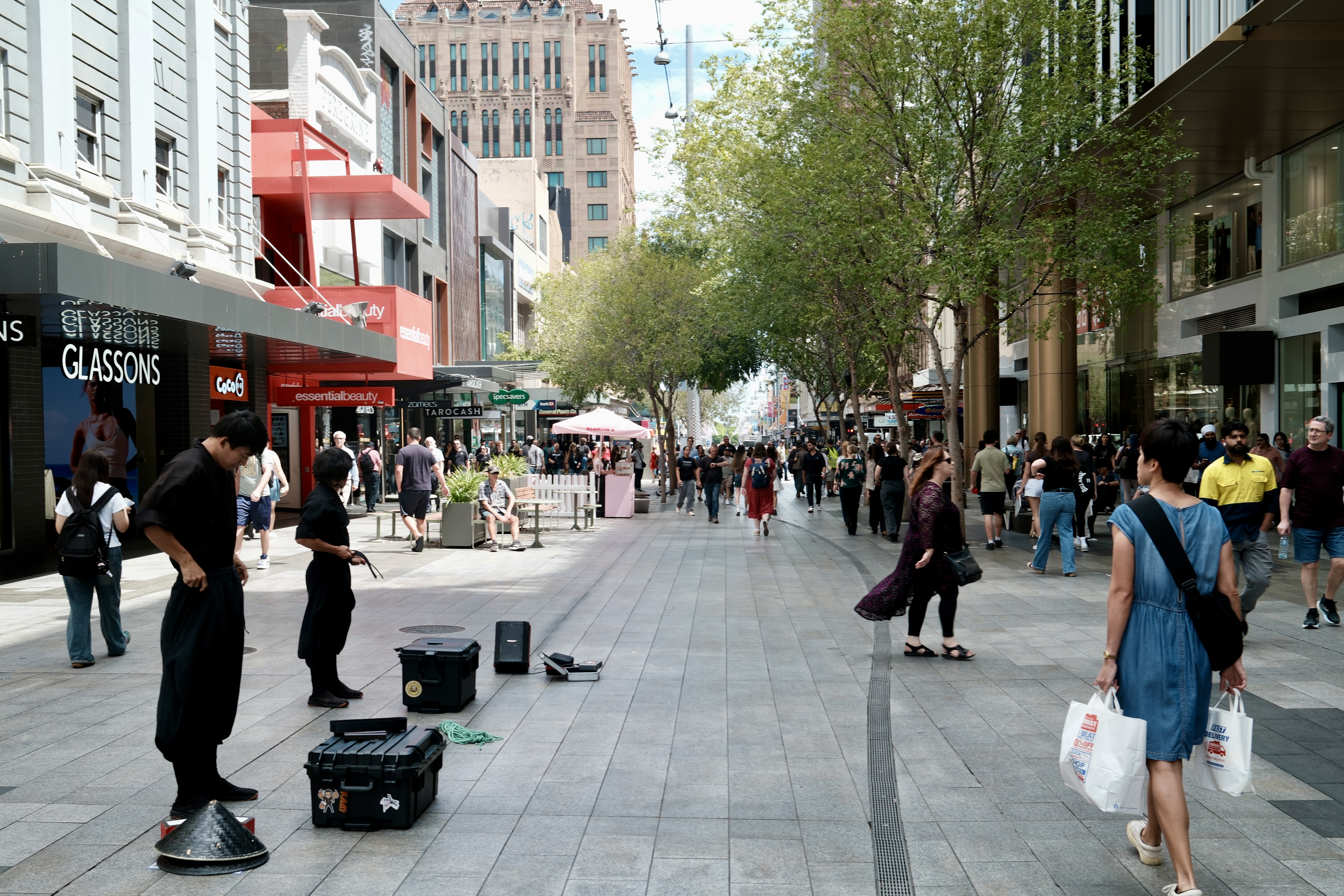
Adelaide Fringe performers in Rundle Mall on 20 February 2026

Rundle Mall is a shopping precinct that is 520 metres (1,710 ft) in length. This shopping area covers the western part of Rundle Street from King William Street to Pulteney Street.

In the initial design, Ian Hannaford Architects used pavement made of brick, shade trees and seats. Hannaford's team got inspiration from their travels to Canada, Scotland and elsewhere in Europe.

Hassell designed the 2013–2015 redevelopment, which included renewing about 520 metres of pavements, improving the underground facilities, installing seats, lights and trees. The work started at King William Street to Gawler Place, then continued towards the eastern side of Pulteney Street. Some of the new pavements were raised during early 2015 to accommodate cabling. The council turned the suspended LED lighting on on 14 October 2015, concluding the development.

The council completed the Gawler Place streetscape in December 2019. The development involved widening of the footpath, installation of lighting, shading and outdoor dining facilities at this street connecting Grenfell Street, Rundle Mall and North Terrace. The installation of Pigeon in November 2020 concluded the development.

=== Street trees and wildlife ===
In the summer and fall of 2024–25, some 10,000 tree martins roosted at night in six of the 40 Chinese elms in the shopping mall, in the vicinity of Rundle Place. Some of the birds were flying into the shop fronts and even entering the shops. In November 2025, the council sought expert opinion on covering the trees with nets. After an assessment of the risks involved in capturing or disturbing the birds, the council decided to watch things unfold during the season 2025–26. On 11 August 2026, the council developed a strategy for the next roosting season.

=== Retail precinct ===
As of 2026, the shopping precinct is home to over 700 retailers, over 300 service providers, three departmental stores and 15 arcades/shopping centres within the area. Over 52 million people visit the mall each year and spend more than $1.5 billion on its premises.

== Historic buildings and sites ==
=== King William Street and western Rundle Mall ===
Waterhouse Chambers, situated at 42–46 King William Street on the south corner of the mall, was constructed between 1847 and 1850 for T. G. Waterhouse. It was constructed using the profits made by Waterhouse from the Burra copper mine. The ground floor shops accommodated his grocery shop while the offices upstairs were occupied by the South Australian Mining Association, of which he was one of the founding directors. The Regency-style facade features curved corner windows. Waterhouse Chambers has been listed on the South Australian Heritage Register since 11 September 1986.

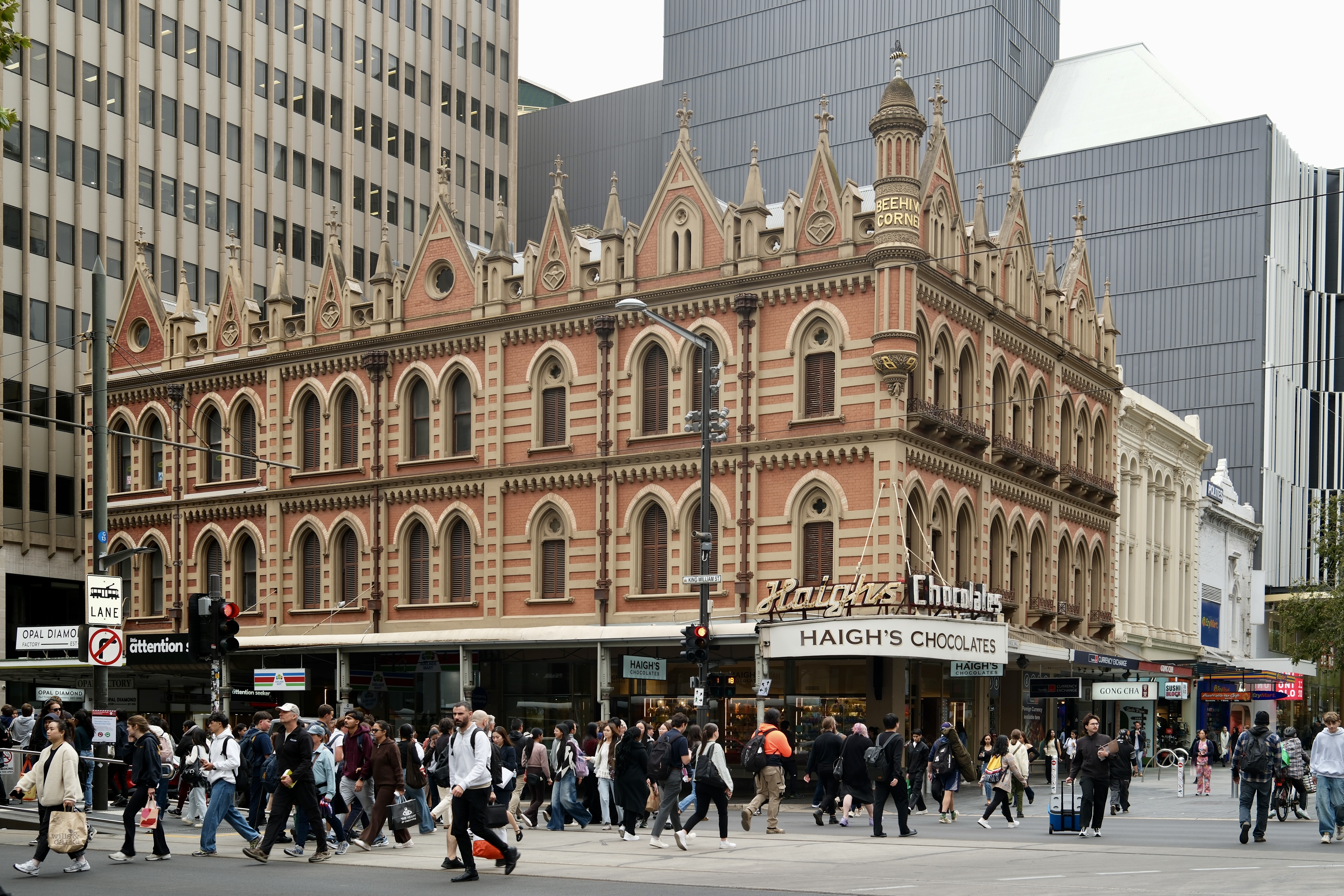
Beehive Corner in 2026

In contrast, Brewer and Robertson founded the Bee Hive drapery in 1849 on the north corner. The current Beehive Corner structure was erected in 1895–96, following Gothic Revival style created by architects English and Soward. The tower in the corner has a golden beehive with a bee in it. Haigh's Chocolates started its operations at 34 King William Street in 1915 and moved into Beehive Corner premises in 1923.

The former Sturt Theatre at 21–23 Rundle Mall, Adelaide, 1 February 2023

The former Grand Theatre located at 21–23 Rundle Mall first opened to the public in 1916 on 1 December. The building was remodelled into the Mayfair Theatre sometime in the 1930s, and in 1953 it was renamed Sturt Theatre. After closing in 1976, the building has been used for office space, but retains the five-storey frontage.

At the corner of Gawler Place, the former Young's Shoe Store building, located at number 55 Rundle Mall, is located between the former Allan's Music Store building and Birks Pharmacy building. Young's was rebuilt between 1925 and 1926 according to plans by Charles W. Rutt and Lawson. The upper floor of the building was erected first in order that the shop could remain in operation while the building works were going on. The exterior façade of the building features a bow window and grey-green glazed brick. The adjacent Birks Pharmacy building at number 57 Rundle Mall was erected in 1925 to a design by McMichael and Harris for Birks Chemists.

Across from Birks Pharmacy, David Jones demolished a three-storey 19th-century department store to build an International Style building clad in marble. Windows were added at upper levels only after David Jones vacated John Martin's.

=== Central and eastern Rundle Mall ===
The hotel on 128–130 Rundle Mall was first licensed in 1838 under the name of the Cornwall Inn and operated as the Plough and Harrow Hotel after 1844. It was refurbished in 1927 under the designs of Murray Richardson and re-named Hotel Richmond.

The commercial buildings located at 135–139 Rundle Mall were erected from 1879 to 1880 by William Kither, who was a butcher, and the architects who designed them were Rees and Hornabrook. These premises witnessed the early display of electricity used for commercial purposes in Adelaide in 1882. In 1926, Clarksons started using the buildings as workshops and in 1932 they stripped the building of its balcony. The Commonwealth Savings Bank of Australia purchased the building in 1958. This building has a sandstone upper facade decorated with Corinthian pilasters and parapet urns.

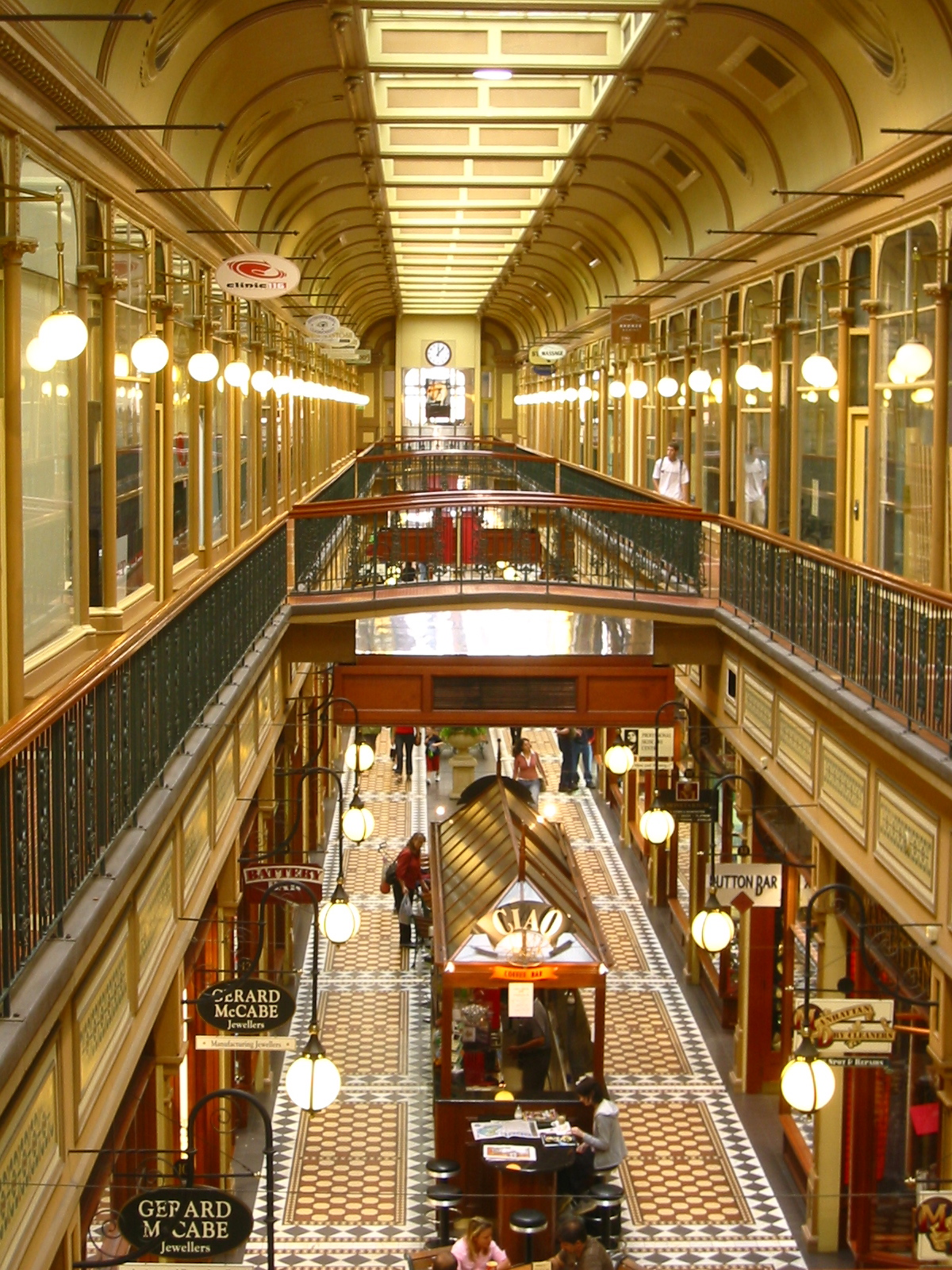
Interior of the Adelaide Arcade, 2003

The Adelaide Arcade, built by Latham Withall and Alfred Wells, is an arcade located between Rundle Mall and Grenfell Street. The foundation stone was laid by Mayor William Bundey on 6 May 1885, and the electrically lighted arcade was officially opened by the Governor William Robinson, on 12 December. The adjacent Gay's Arcade, designed by James Cumming, opens into Twin Street. Gay's Arcade was severely damaged by fire in 1980, resulting in damages to Adelaide Arcade exceeding $2 million.

Daniel Garlick & Son requested tenders in 1886 for the premises at 150–152 Rundle Mall, having a German Renaissance façade ornamented with ornamental plasterwork by Charles Vernon.

The Vosz Shop of 124–126 Rundle Mall, constructed between 1901 and 1902 for H. L. Vosz Ltd, a dealer in glass, oil, and paints, was designed by English and Soward. It opened on 1 January 1943 as the Liberty Cinema with a capacity for 400 people and also served as the Curzon Theatre for the screening of foreign movies.

The façade of the former Balfour's shop and café of 74 Rundle Mall was renewed in 1924. Its designer is Louis Laybourne Smith, the architect of Woods, Bagot and Laybourne Smith, whose façade includes a steel and glass curtain wall flanked by pilasters. The information from the city's heritage survey states that the original wooden wall panelling of the café has been preserved after its renovations.

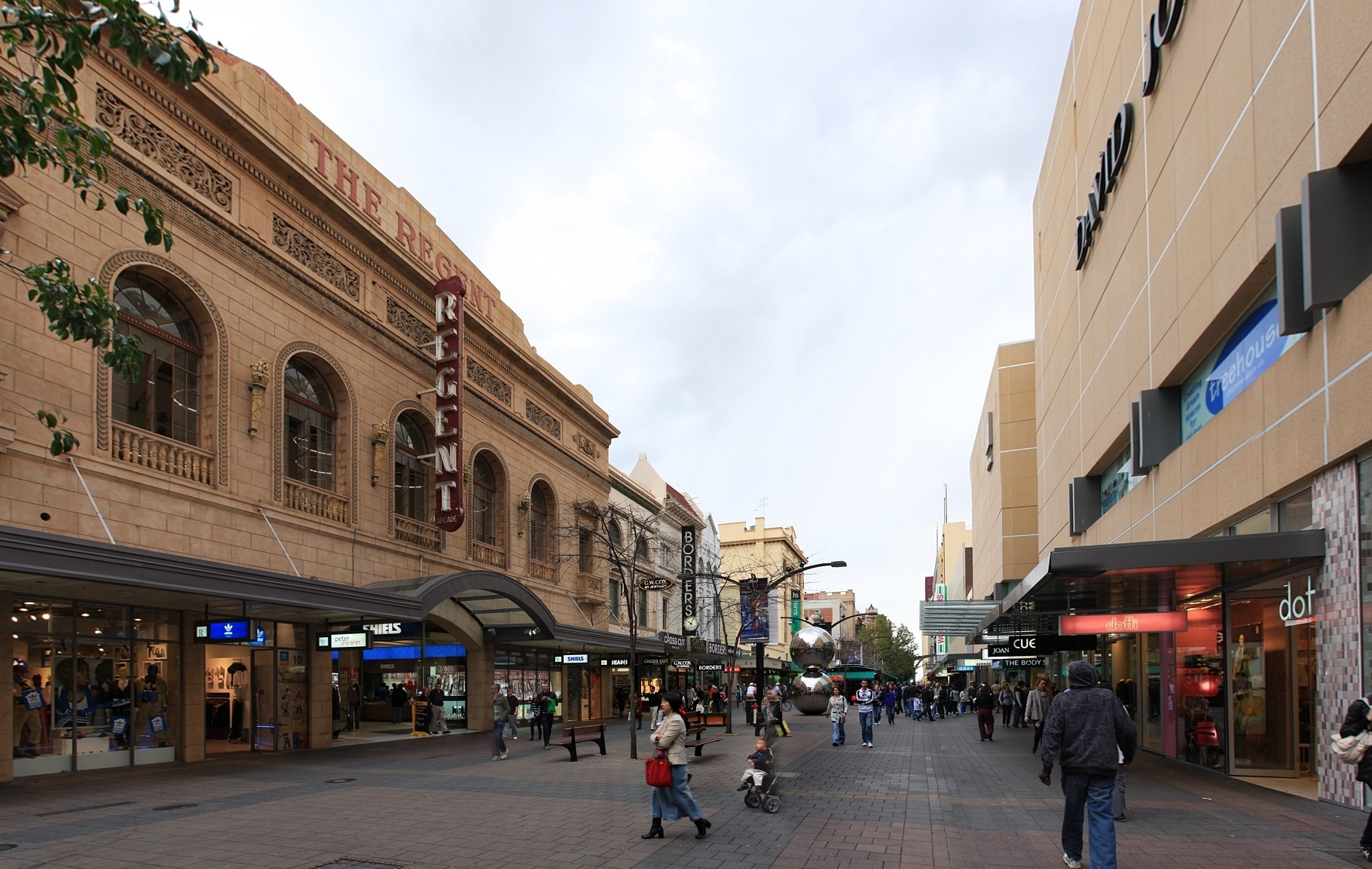
The former Regent Theatre, opposite the David Jones store in Rundle Mall, 2009

The former Hoyts Regent Theatre at 101–109 Rundle Mall was built between 1927 and 1928 to designs by Cedric Ballantyne and English, Soward and Jackson. It opened on 29 June 1928 and hosted film screenings and stage performances. The Regent Theatre closed for renovations in 1967. Its ground floor was converted into Regent Arcade, and the upstairs dress circle was refitted as a cinema.

The former G. J. Coles & Company Adelaide Store located at 112–118 Rundle Mall is the work of Harry Norris, with functionalist architecture and a rounded corner, horizontal windows and glazed ceramic tiles. The total cost of construction was A£80,000 and the store was opened on 14 November 1940. The company announced its intention to close down the store in August 1984.

=== Rundle Mall Fountain ===
Rundle Mall Fountain in 2025

The Rundle Mall Fountain is one of the two fountains that were cast in the late 1880s and put up outside the Jubilee Exhibition Building on North Terrace. This building housed the Adelaide Jubilee International Exhibition that was opened on 21 June 1887. Both the fountains were presented to the council in 1908 by the state government.

The smaller fountain was first placed at the crossing point of Rundle Mall and Gawler Place in 1976. It was filled with champagne provided by Hardy's on 1 September when Premier Dunstan officially opened the mall. It was shifted eastward to the Rundle Mall entrance of Adelaide Arcade in 1995.

== Public art ==
=== The Spheres ===
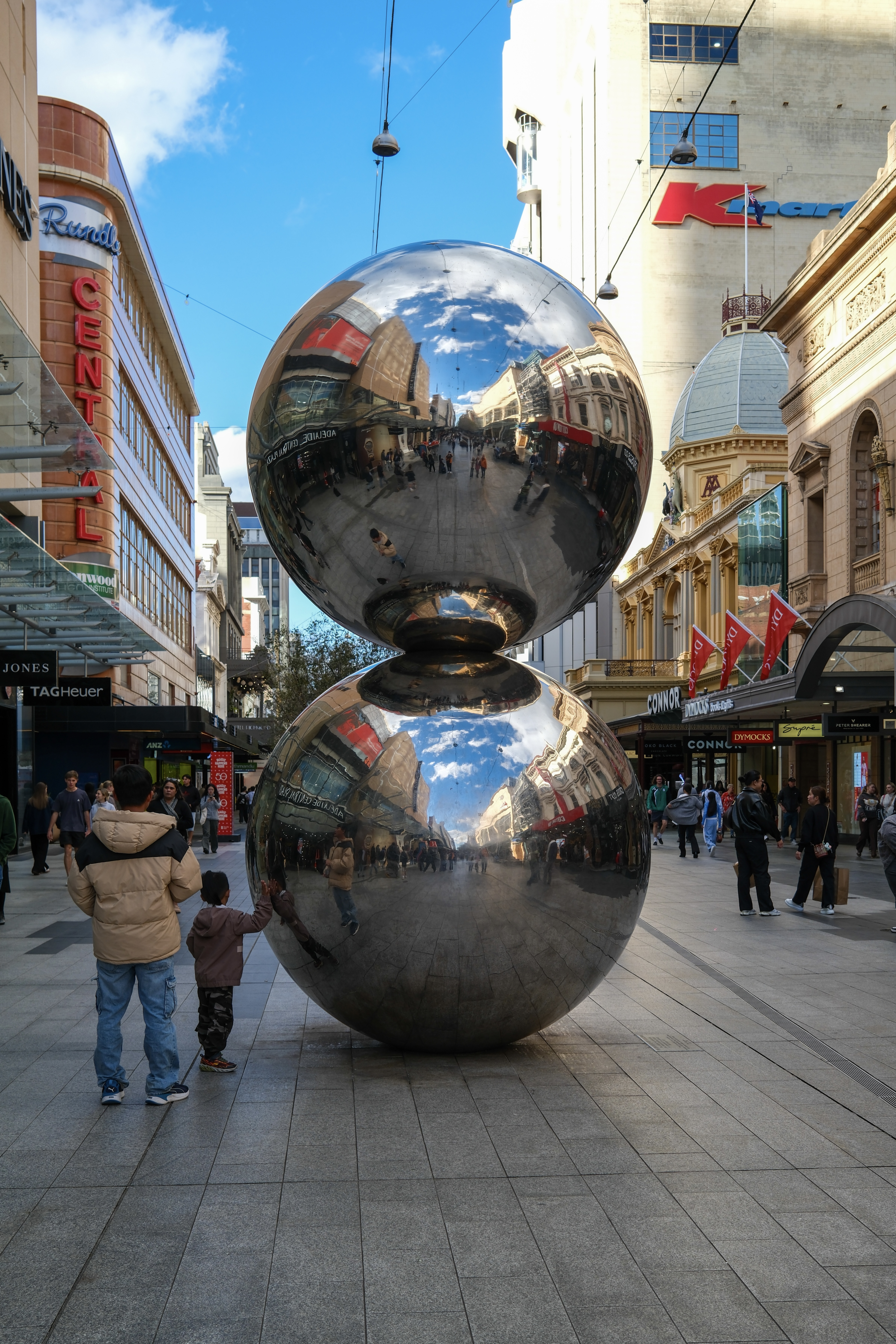
The Spheres in 2026

Spheres, commonly known as the Mall's Balls, is a stainless steel sculpture by Bert Flugelman. The council commissioned four artists to submit designs for Rundle Mall and chose Flugelman's design involving two spheres with diameters of 2.15 metres, mounted one above the other. The Hindmarsh Building Society financed the project and presented the sculpture to the City of Adelaide to celebrate its centenary. It was installed on 5 October 1977. An image of the sculpture's silhouette forms part of the Rundle Mall logo.

A vote was taken on 29 January 2013 on a motion that opposed the relocation of the sculpture, and the council rejected it 9 to 2. It allowed the relocation of the Spheres and the Adelaide Arcade fountain by three metres south as part of the $30 million redevelopment of the shopping precinct. According to the council, this would make access easier for emergency services and reduce pedestrian congestion. Lord Mayor Yarwood explained that it would help to carry out the stormwater works under the precinct. However, Flugelman rejected the move, arguing that the site had become a meeting place.

Both the sculptures and sections of the Gawler Place adjacent were vandalised through graffiti between 27 October and 28 October 2018. The graffiti was subsequently cleaned from the sculptures on 28 October.

=== The Slide ===
The Slide in 2023

The Slide, also known as Girl on a Slide, is a 1977 bronze sculpture by John Dowie depicting a girl sliding down a concrete plinth. This sculpture was made as a result of the suggestion from Hannaford to make an artwork that would be discovered by people walking through Rundle Mall. The sculpture was given to the City of Adelaide by the chairman and directors of John Martin & Co. In 1977, its chairman, Edward Hayward, officially handed it over to Lord Mayor Roche.

In February 2020, blue paint was sprayed on the bronze sculpture along with the base. The council hired Artlab Australia for the cleaning process. The conservators cleaned the paint, and the bronze sculpture was returned to its natural look with wax treatment applied to it.

=== A Day Out ===
A Day Out, commonly known as the Rundle Mall pigs, is an installation by Marguerite Derricourt near Stephens Place. It features four full-scale bronze cast pigs with a uniquely designed litter bin made from cast-bronze litter on top of it.

The council chose the design of Derricourt from the finalists of a national sculpture competition held for the final phase of the redevelopment of the mall in the late 1990s. The design was judged by an independent panel from 126 designs submitted. Derricourt took inspiration from a bronze statue of a boar in Florence called Il Porcellino, and her intent was that people would touch and interact with the pigs. The statue was unveiled by Lord Mayor Jane Lomax-Smith on 3 July 1999. A subsequent public competition conducted by the council and The Advertiser christened the pigs as Horatio, Oliver, Truffles and Augusta. Oliver's tail was altered in the next few years due to safety concerns.

The pigs were taken down for refurbishment in the 2013–2014 period when there was a redevelopment of the mall. At the time of the installation's 21st anniversary, in July 2020, Derricourt mentioned in an interview that while researching her sculpture, she had visited a pig farm in New South Wales.

The sculpture was damaged on 23 September 2020 by an acidic liquid that cut through the patina of all four pigs, revealing the underlying bronze. The affected parts were repaired to resemble the existing patina and covered with a protective wax layer.

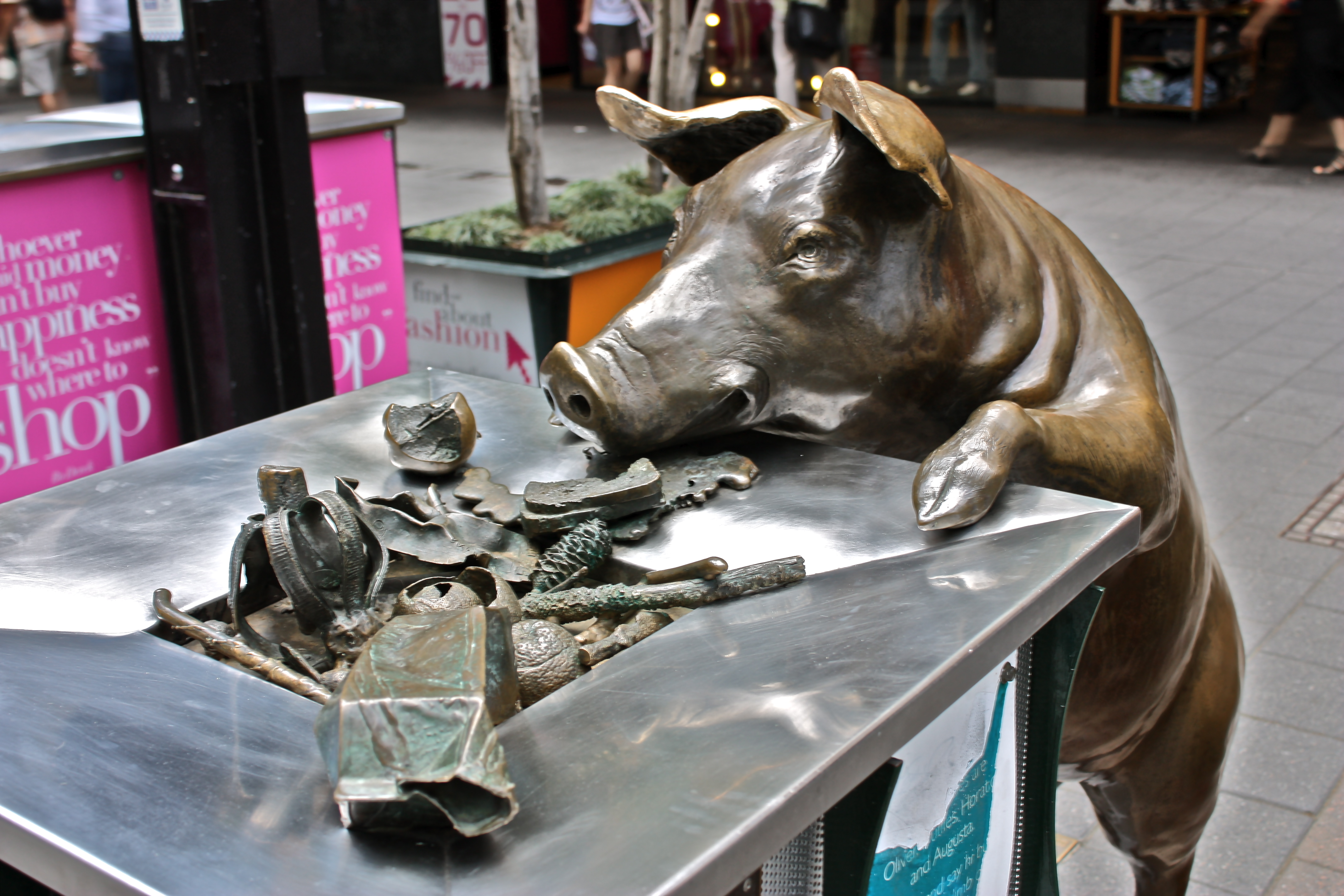
Oliver

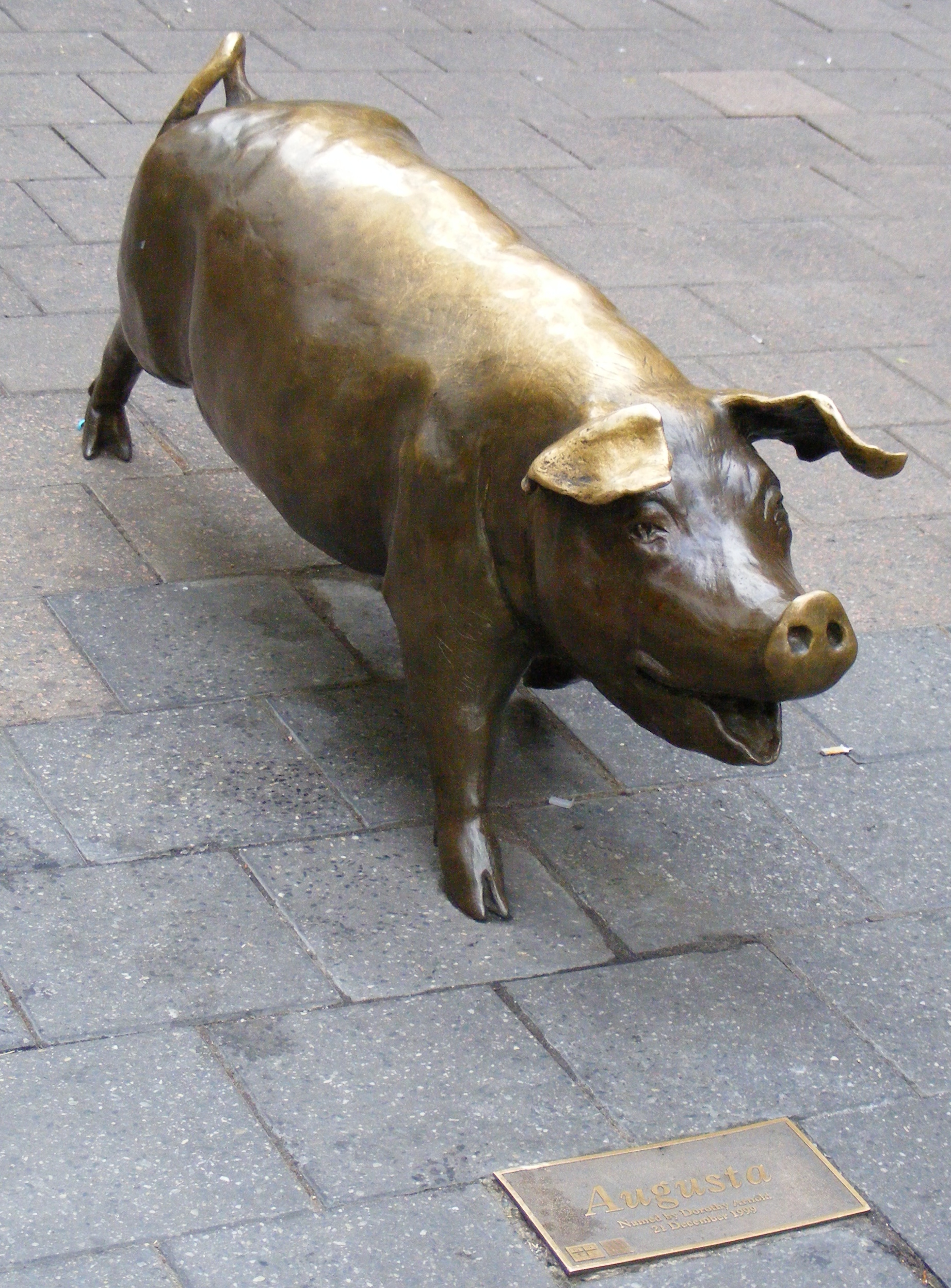
Augusta

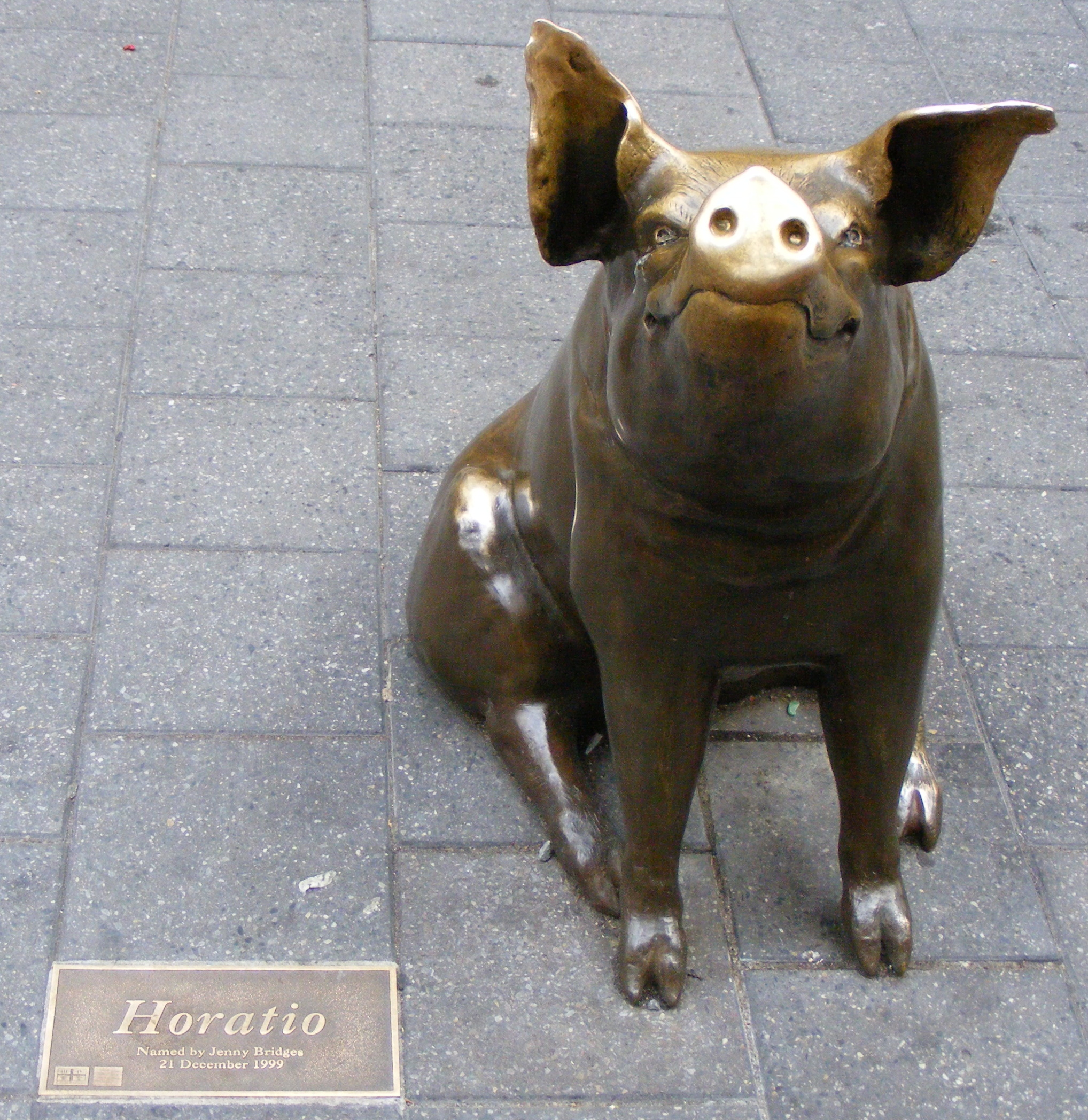
Horatio

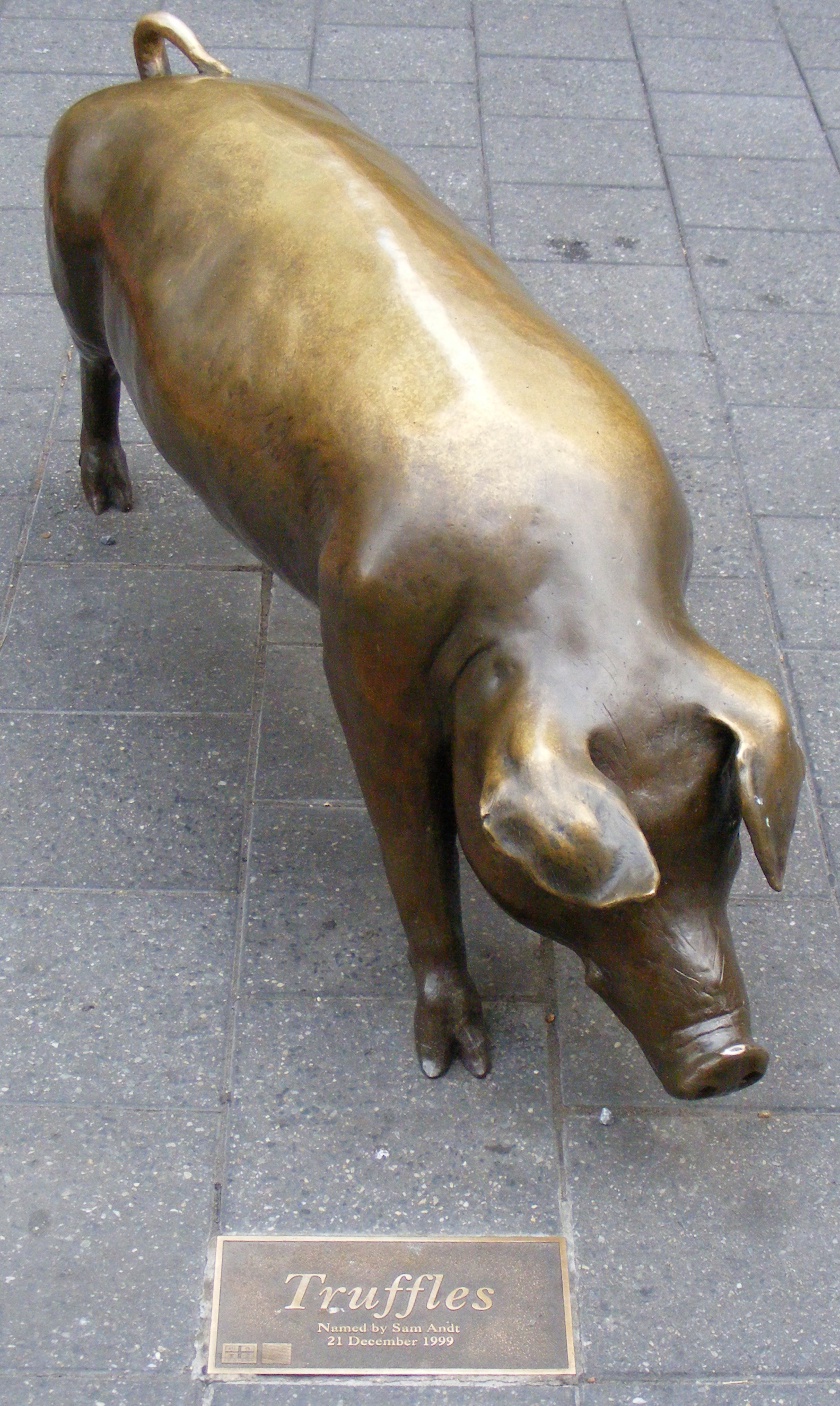
Truffles

=== Pigeon ===
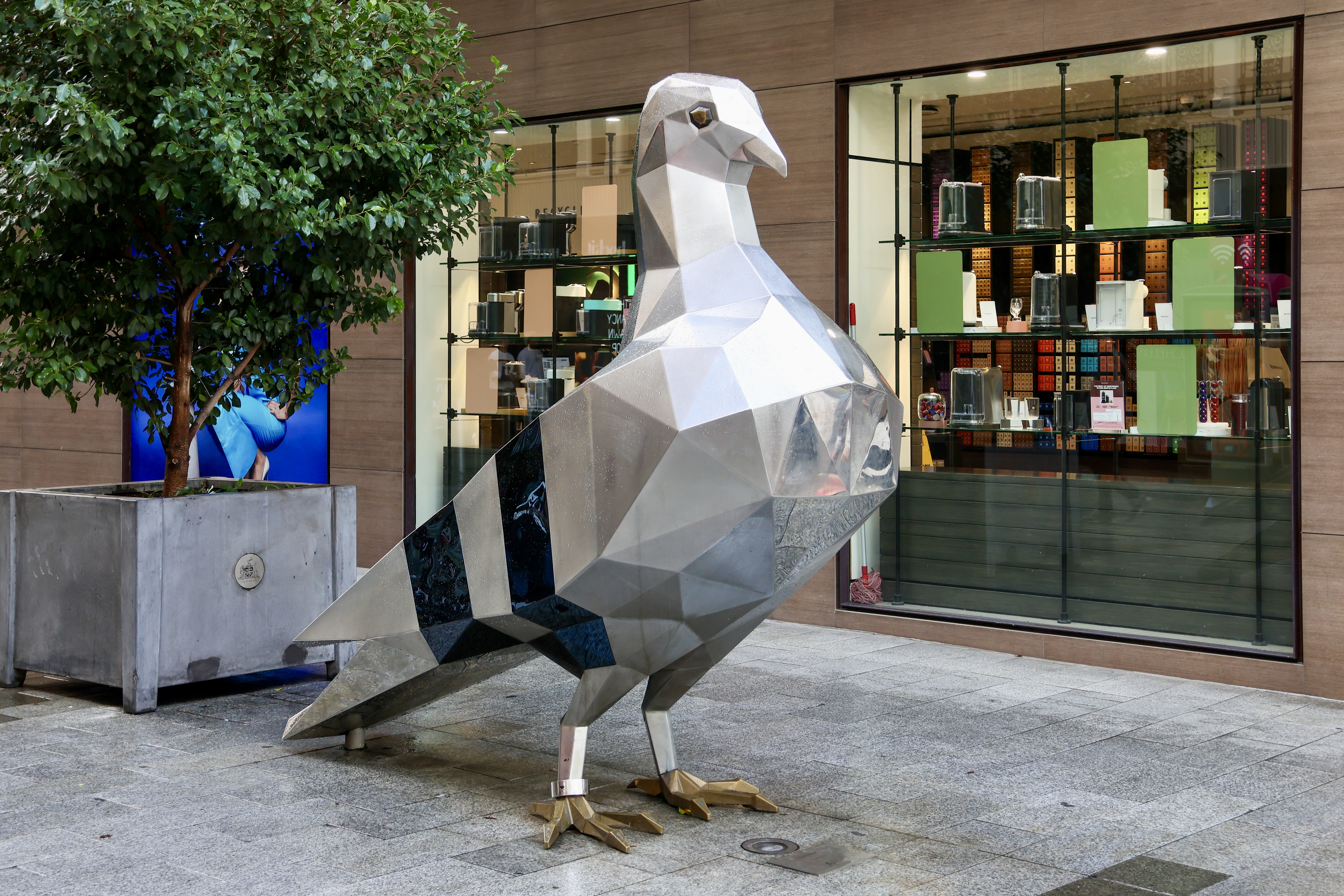
Pigeon in 2026

Pigeon is a 2.3-metre mirrored stainless steel sculpture by South Australian artist Paul Sloan. According to the Hugo Michell Gallery, this is Sloan's first significant public art work.

The sculpture was unveiled by the council at the intersection of Gawler Place and Rundle Mall, on 6 November 2020. The price of the art installation is $174,000. Sloan wanted to pay attention to pigeons as an inevitable element of the urban landscape. Lord Mayor Sandy Verschoor justified the price of Pigeon.

=== Progress ===
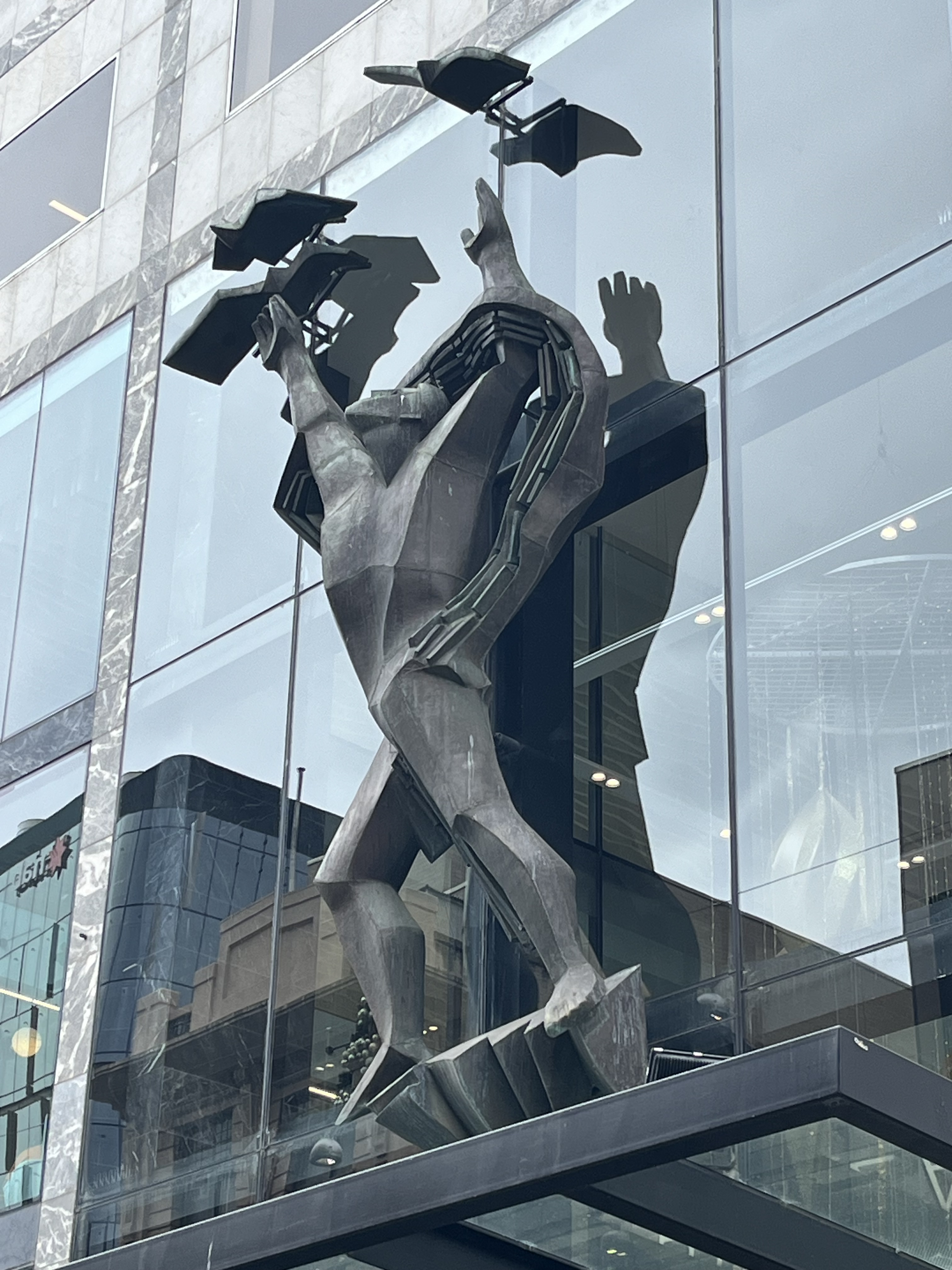
Progress in 2025

Progress is a neo-Cubist wall sculpture by Lyndon Dadswell, made from sheet copper, steel, stainless steel and bronze. The Charles Birks & Co department store at Rundle Street was purchased by David Jones in 1954 and was rebuilt. Following this, the sculpture was commissioned artwork in 1959.

The unveiling of the artwork was done by the Premier Thomas Playford IV prior to completing the building, coinciding with the second Adelaide Festival of Arts in 1962. Progress was installed on the facade of David Jones in 1963.

=== Temporary pieces ===
The mall exhibited the colourised photos of old Adelaide structures to celebrate the 30th Anniversary of the Heritage Incentives Scheme of the council. In 2019–2020, the council and the Adelaide Festival showcased Tatzu Nishi's sculpture A Doll's House.

At the 2021 Adelaide Festival, New York artist Robin Frohardt's The Plastic Bag Store consisted of a fake supermarket containing objects fashioned out of recycled plastic, coinciding with the implementation of the new single-use plastic ban in the state.

== Culture and public events ==
In its inauguration in 1976, Premier Dunstan referred to the mall as an open-air space where people can meet and walk. There have been many events that have been held at the mall, such as multicultural festivals, public events, and even a gathering of fans of the Adelaide Thunderbirds team after winning a premiership.

During NAIDOC Week 2018, a copy of the artwork entitled A Mother's Strength by Lorelle Hunter was unveiled under the canopy of the mall.

In March 2021, Lindes Lane, an alley that branches off Rundle Mall, just beside Rundle Place, got a new name called No Fixed Address Lane in honour of the Aboriginal reggae rock band called No Fixed Address. This is as part of the City of Music Laneways initiative.

== Transportation ==
Adelaide Metro trams stop on King William Street at the western end of Rundle Mall. Trams on this route run from Glenelg–Royal Adelaide Hospital and Glenelg–Festival Plaza lines. The tram stop for Art Gallery on North Terrace offers access through Gawler Place. Bus stops are available on King William Street, Pulteney Street, Grenfell Street and North Terrace. Access to the mall can be gained from King William Street and Pulteney Street. Access is also available through laneways and arcades from North Terrace and Grenfell Street. There are ground-level accesses available from the mall into all the arcades.

Adelaide railway station is about a five-minute walk from the mall. Free 99C City Connector bus stops close to the western end of the mall. There are more than 5,000 parking spaces within the precinct and taxi ranks available at Gawler Place, King William Street, Pulteney Street, North Terrace and Grenfell Street. On-street parking is limited.

Preceding station	Adelaide Metro	Following station
Adelaide towards Royal Adelaide Hospital or Adelaide Entertainment Centre	Glenelg tram line	Pirie Street towards Moseley Square
Festival Plaza Weekends and event days Terminus	Glenelg tram line	Pirie Street towards Moseley Square
