= Dazzeland =

Indoor amusement park in Adelaide, South Australia

- Interactive map of Dazzeland
- Location: Adelaide, South Australia, Australia
- Coordinates: 34°55′20″S 138°36′2″E
- Opened: 1991
- Closed: 31 January 1998
- Slogan: Australia's Premier Indoor Theme Park

Attractions
- Roller coasters: 1

Dazzeland was a two-storey family entertainment centre occupying the top levels of the REMM Myer Centre in Rundle Mall, a major shopping mall in Adelaide, Australia. The centre was built between 1988 and 1991, at a cost of $1 billion. Some years later, the centre was sold for $140 million, contributing to the collapse of the State Bank of South Australia.

The park's signature attraction was a figure 8 roller coaster named "Jazz Junction", its track running overhead along the fifth level. Other attractions included dodgem cars, a carousel, a Lego Expo, giant playground, musical fountain, and train.

With the park's closure on 31 January 1998, an attempt was made to fill the upper levels with smaller, higher paying retail tenants. This soon proved unsuccessful in luring the necessary foot traffic, whereby the upper level remained vacant for many years. The remains of Jazz Junction were removed during 2003 as part of the renovation of the Myer Centre.

A Fernwood Fitness Centre gym was located in part of the space during the early 2000s; as of December 2009, Fernwood had relocated to the Renaissance Centre, leaving level 4 entirely empty and closed-off to the public. In March 2013, the centre commenced work on an upgrade. In August of that year, the escalators (sealed off from levels 4 and 5 since the park's closure) were removed completely.

In late 2015, it was announced that Dazzeland would be used temporarily in 2016 as a venue for the Adelaide Festival of Arts.

In early 2019, part of level 4 became the new location of CDW Studios, which had previously been on level 3 alongside Lincraft.

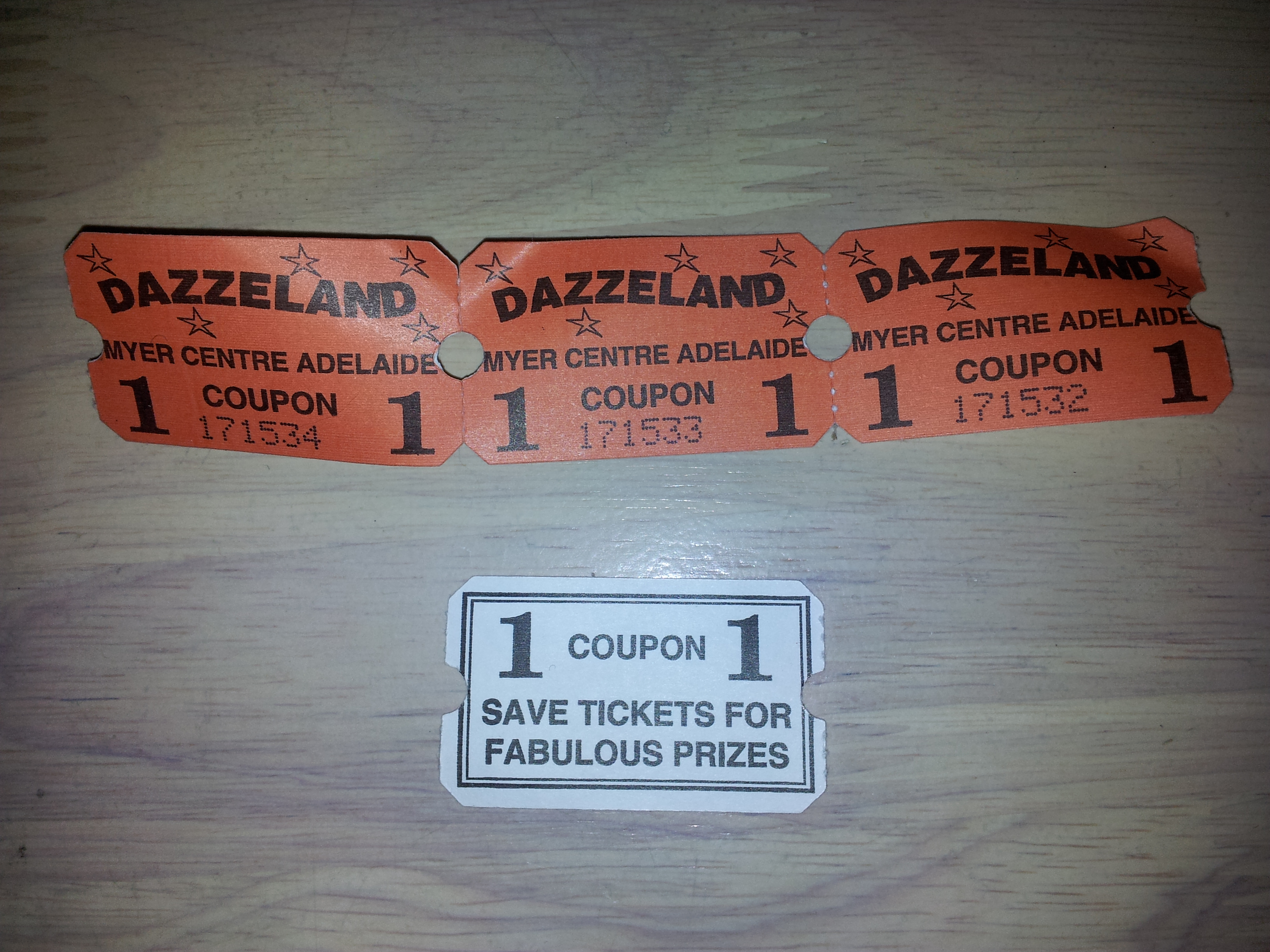
Dazzleland Coupon Tickets
