= Makris Group =

Retail property group

- Type: Private
- Industry: Shopping Malls, Property Development
- Headquarters: Gold Coast, Australia
- Key people: Con Makris (owner)
- Number of employees: 10
- Website: www.makris.com.au

Makris Group is an Australian property investment and development company with assets across South Australia, Queensland and Victoria.

== Shopping centres ==
Makris Group own the following shopping centres and developments:

- Oxford Hotel - North Adelaide
- Marina Pier, Glenelg, South Australia
- Marina Mirage
- Gilles Plains Shopping Centre
- Oracle Boulevard
- Endeavour Hills Shopping Centre
