= Myer Centre, Adelaide =

Shopping centre in Adelaide, Australia

Myer Centre Adelaide
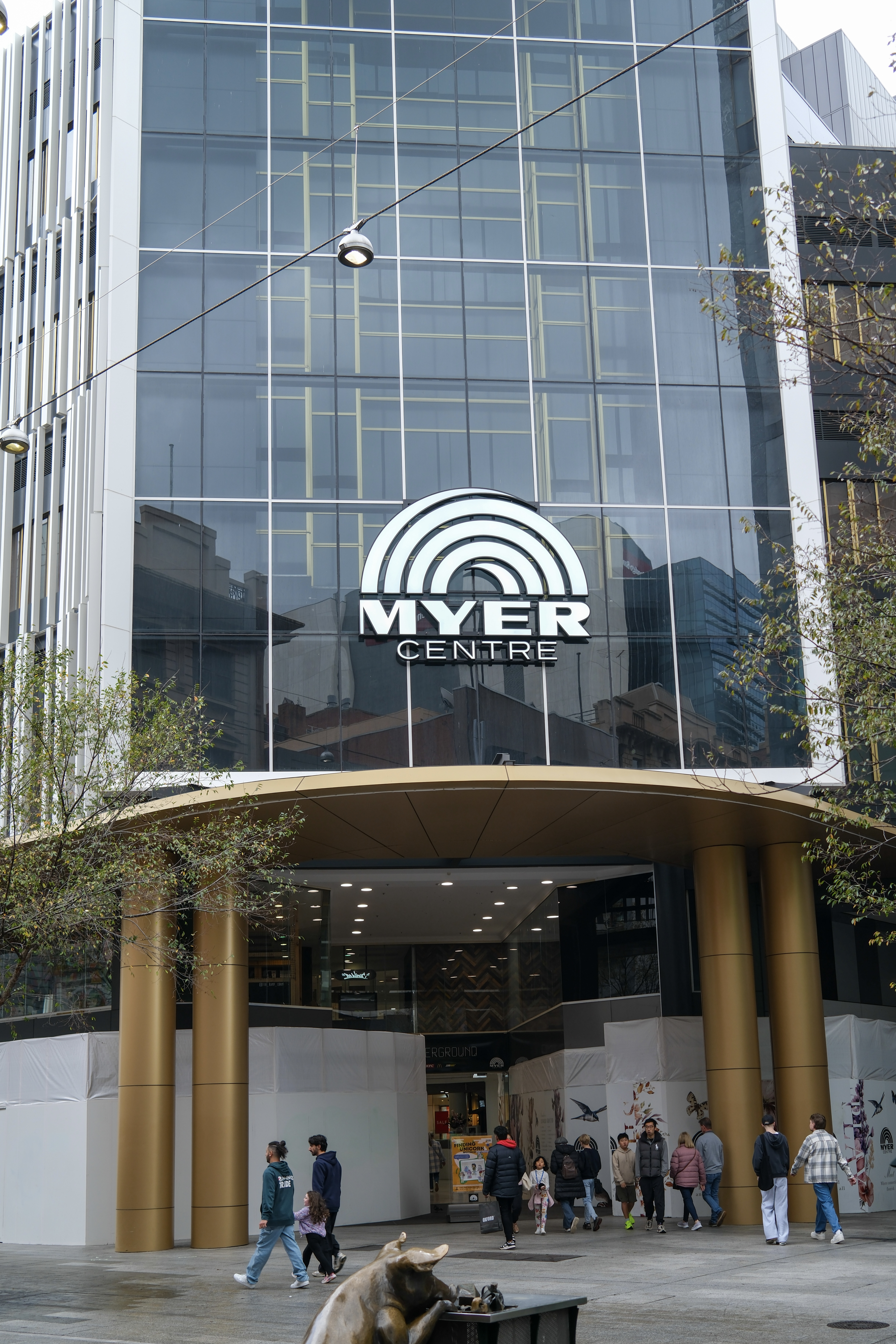
- Main entrance of the Myer Centre in 2026
- Interactive map of the Myer Centre Adelaide area

General information
- Type: Retail, Office
- Location: Adelaide, Australia, 14-38 Rundle Mall
- Coordinates: 34°55′20″S 138°36′2″E
- Construction started: 1988
- Completed: 1991
- Cost: A$ 1 billion
- Landlord: Starhill Global REIT

Height
- Antenna spire: 75 m (246 ft)
- Roof: 68 m (223 ft)

Technical details
- Floor count: 20 (14 floors above ground & 6 floors underground)

Design and construction
- Architect: Buchan, Laird and Bawden
- Developer: REMM Group
- Structural engineer: Wallbridge and Gilbert
- Main contractor: REMM Constructions & Allco Newsteel

Website
- www.myercentreadelaide.com.au

The Myer Centre is a five-story shopping centre in the heart of the Adelaide central business district, South Australia. A significant landmark in Rundle Mall, it houses South Australia's largest Myer store alongside over 80 smaller shops and a large underground food court. It is also accessible from North Terrace and an airbridge to David Jones. As of 2024, it is owned by Starhill Global REIT.

== History ==
The North Terrace side of the Myer Centre includes two heritage-listed buildings, which were integrated using facadism into the centre upon construction. Listed on the South Australian Heritage Register, Shell House was constructed in 1931 and Goldsbrough House in 1935. Goldsbrough House was designed for Goldsbrough Mort & Co by prominent SA architect Frank Kenneth Milne. An extra storey was added in 1936, and the building was state heritage-listed in 1986. The old lobby, lift, and stairwell were refurbished and integrated to the Myer department store of The Myer Centre.

=== 1980s and 1990s ===
The shopping centre was constructed between 1988 and 1991, undertaken by developers REMM Group, at a cost of A$1 billion, making it the most expensive retail development in Australia at the time. REMM Group Ltd built the centre directly after the Myer Centre in Brisbane, which shares many architectural and décor elements. It was designed by Buchan, Laird and Bawden and built by structural engineers Wallbridge and Gilbert. (Note: See also Pirie Street Brewery for more about Wallbridge and Gilbert.) The postmodern design emphasised a Victorian theme, utilising ornate railing and fittings in brass and heritage green, with terrazzo floor tiles. A six-storey office tower named Terrace Towers was constructed behind the two historic buildings, sitting atop the centre.

Between 1991 and 1998, the upper level of the interior atrium housed a family entertainment centre named Dazzeland. It was home to Australia's only indoor rollercoaster, which circled a 5-story void on a figure-8 track. Named both Jazz Junction and Blues Bullet, and manufactured by Zamperla, the rollercoaster drew significant attention to the centre upon opening. It was removed along with other attractions when Dazzeland closed in 1998, with the centre management refocusing to create a more luxurious shopping experience.

=== 2000s to 2020s ===
In 2013, the interior of the complex underwent major renovation aimed at enhancing the shopping experience. The $30 million project modernized the food court with an "urban" style and updated the entire interior color scheme, shifting from beige, heritage green, and brass accents to a predominantly white, minimalist design. The elevators were clad to appear more modern, all accessible floors retiled to white, and escalators to the now vacant Floor 5 removed entirely.

In 2023, the building underwent significant external renovation. A new façade was added over the original, featuring a modernised LED-lit exterior which illuminates at night.

== Layout ==
The Myer Centre comprises two main sections: an eight-level open atrium with elevators and escalators at the sides, and the Myer store with its own dedicated escalators and elevators. The centre design has faced criticism for its vertical and complex layout, which creates difficulty in moving between floors.

- Lower Ground: Food court
- Ground Floor: Main entrance to Myer, Uniqlo, Shiels Jewellers, Platypus Shoes, Grahams Jewellery, Prouds, Laser Clinics Australia, Review, Lush, Bed Bath N Table
- Upper Ground: DaKlinic, USG Store
- Level 1: Myer, Ally Fashion, Valleygirl, MCL Fashion, Jacqui E, Adelaide Bridal Couture, Posh Nails, Studio SAL
- Level 2: Myer, Toyworld, Rivers, Three of Cups, Page & Turner, Laser Clinics Australia
- Level 3: Lincraft, Music Consortium, OBR Horology, OrthoSmart Dental Studio, Media Makeup
- Level 4 Entirely occupied by CDW Studios, a VFX training company.
- Level 5 (formerly Dazzeland upper floor): no longer open to the general public, escalators removed, and in original unrenovated condition.
- Level 6: Centre Management
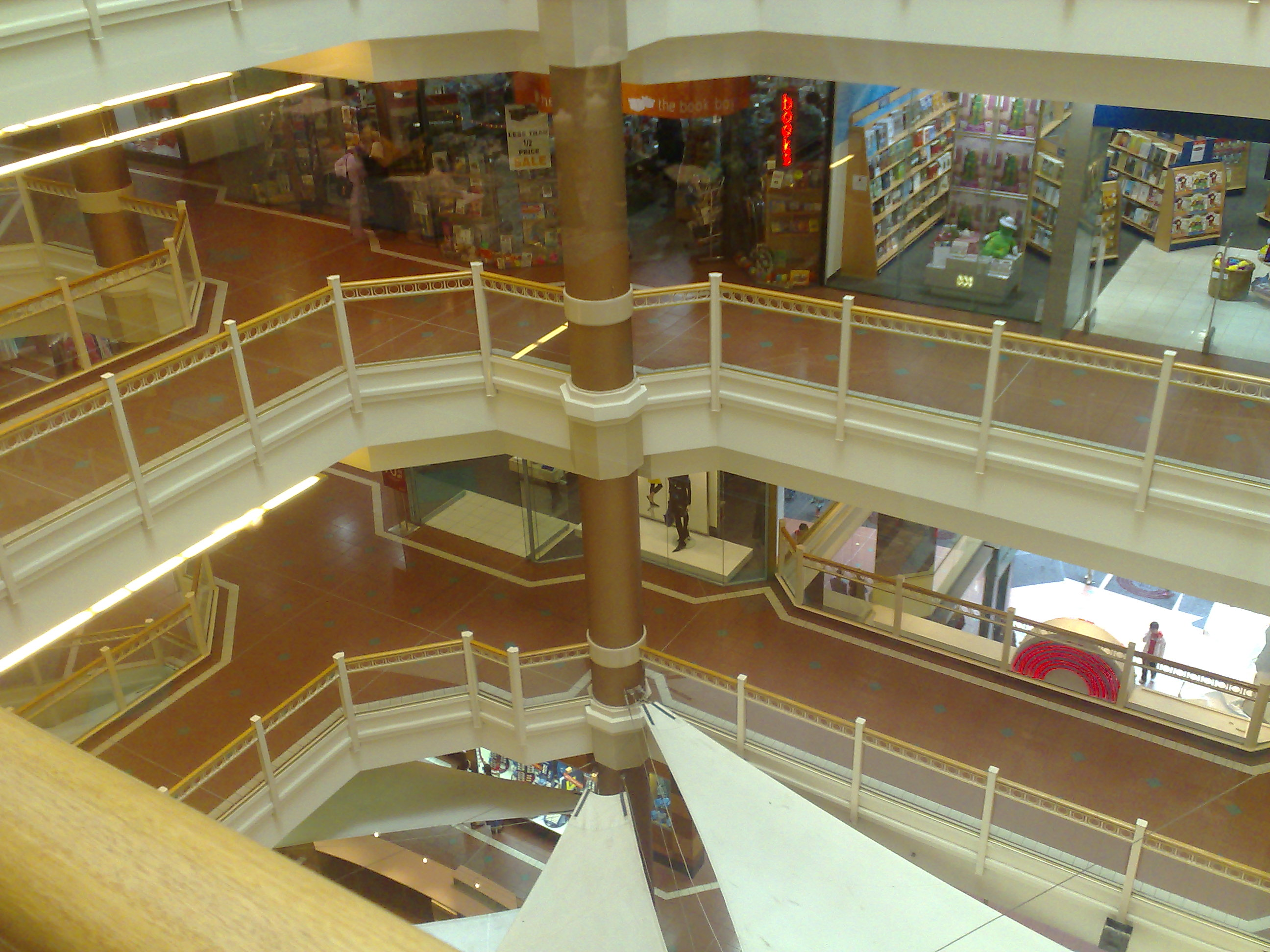
Inside the Myer Centre in 2007, before remodelling, looking down from the 5th floor

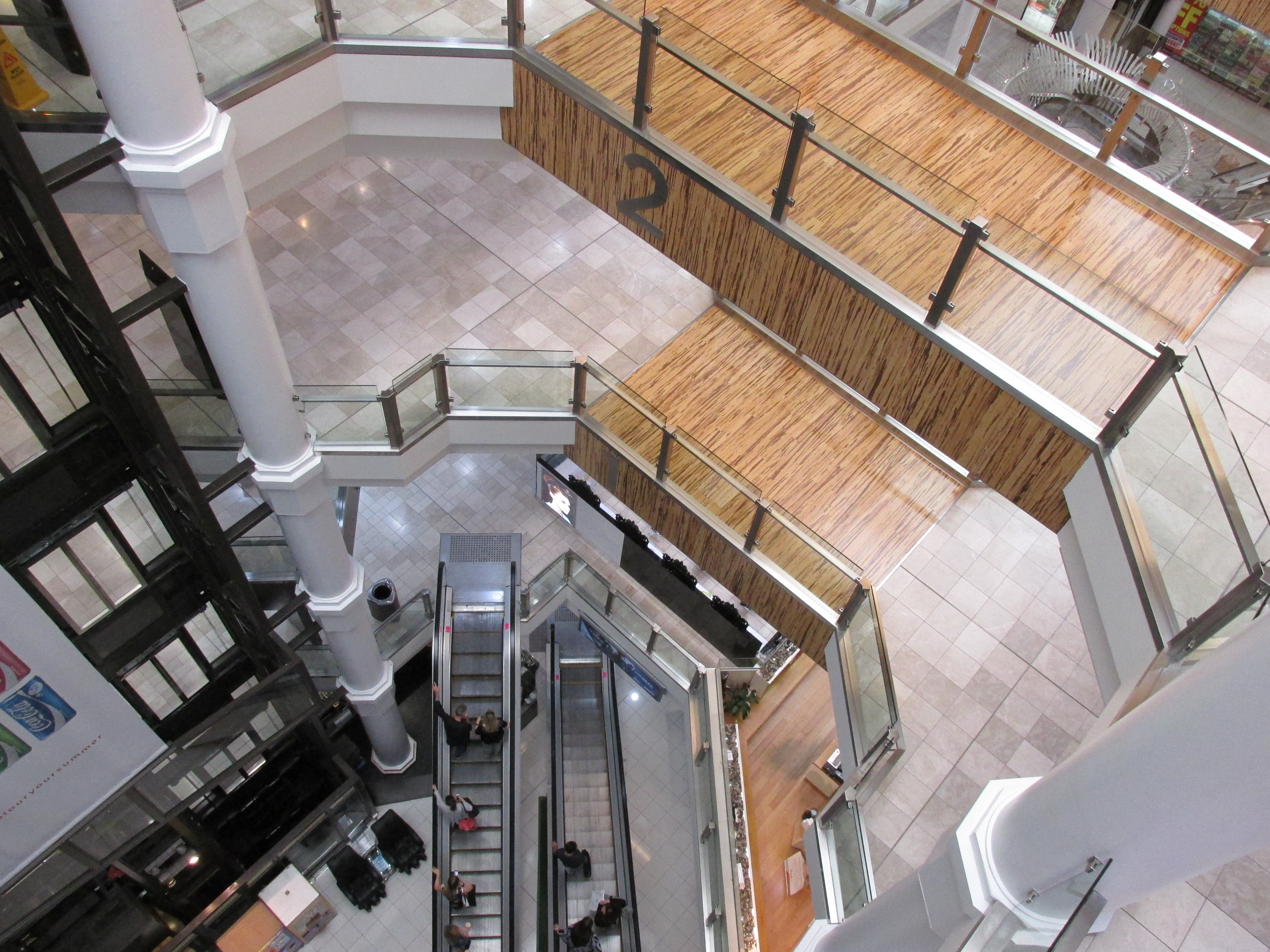
Inside the Myer Centre in 2014, after remodelling
