= Gawler Place =

Street in Adelaide, South Australia

Gawler Place South Australia
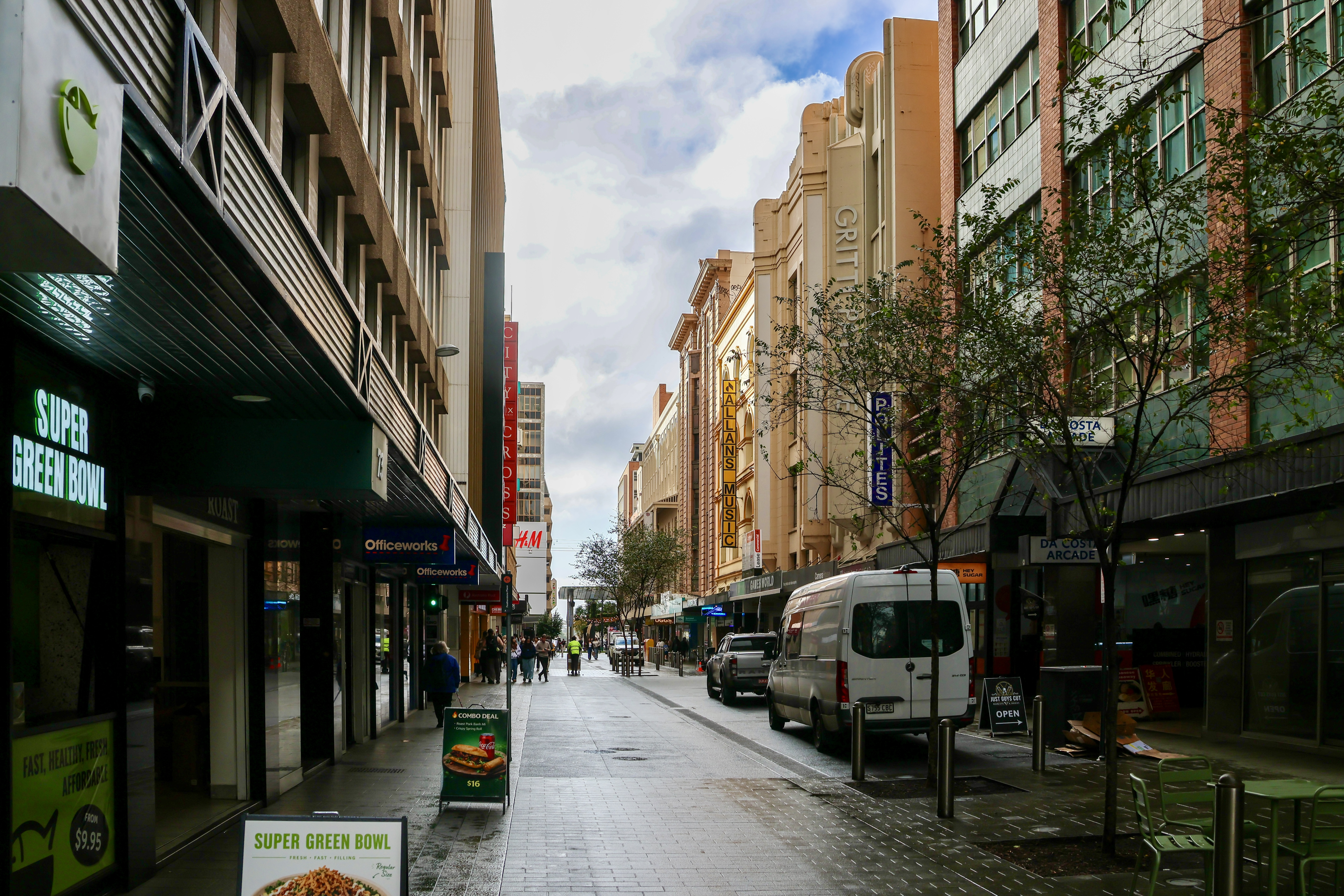
- Gawler Place looking north, 2026

General information
- Type: Street

Major junctions
- North end: North Terrace
- South end: Wakefield Street

Location(s)
- LGA(s): City of Adelaide

Gawler Place is a single-lane thoroughfare in the city centre of Adelaide, the capital of South Australia. Somewhat narrower than other busy streets in the Central Business District, it runs north to south from North Terrace to Wakefield Street, parallel to and approximately midway between King William and Pulteney streets.

== History ==
Before 1904, the lanes that now make up Gawler Place included Rundle Place (North Terrace to Rundle Street, now Rundle Mall), Gawler Place (Rundle to Grenfell Street) and Freeman Street (Grenfell to Wakefield Street), in addition to Gawler Place.

The Adelaide City Council announced a planned upgrade to the thoroughfare in 2017. Undertaken in 2019, the upgrade included new footpath and road surfaces, lighting, seating and spaces for socialising.

=== Historic buildings ===
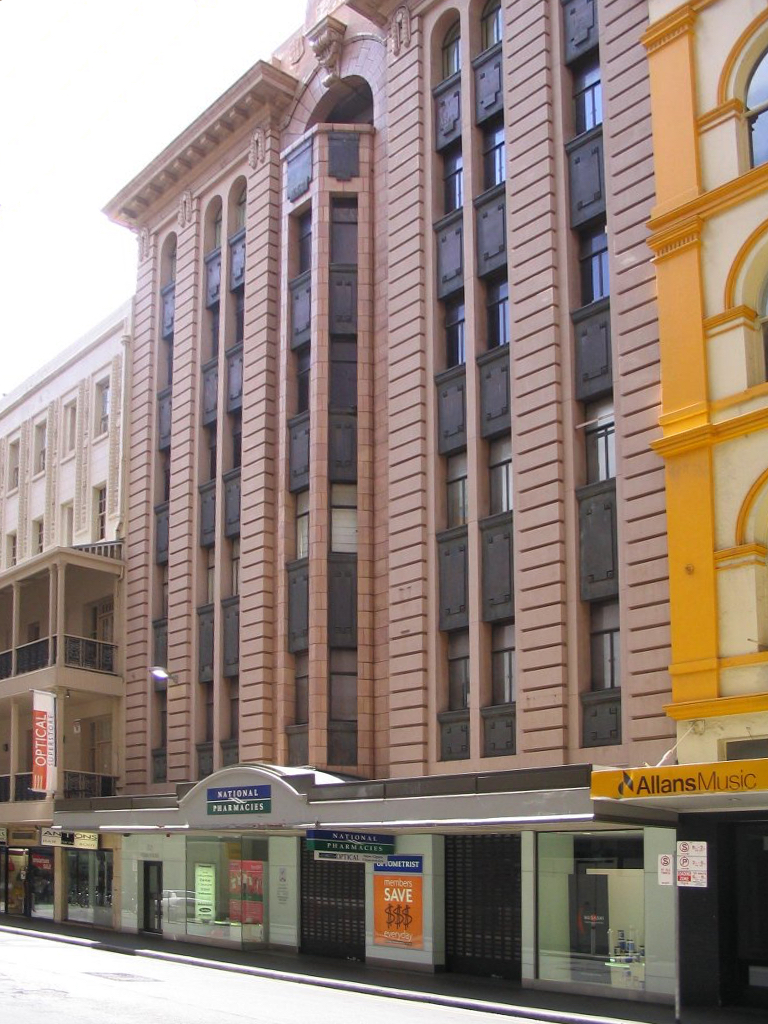
52–56 Gawler Place, formerly Claridge House, in 2008

Several historic buildings are situated in Gawler Place, including Gawler Chambers (188 North Terrace, corner of North Terrace and Gawler Place), the Oriental Hotel (42–50 Gawler Place), the former Claridge House (52–56), and Allan's Building (58–60).

== Description ==
Since Rundle Mall is a pedestrian mall, driving across it on Gawler Place is not permitted. Between North Terrace and Rundle Mall, Gawler Place permits two-way traffic, with access to a multi-storey car park and a taxi rank near Rundle Mall. It is also two-way between Rundle Mall and Grenfell Street for access to businesses on this stretch. South of Grenfell Street, Gawler Place is one-way, for northbound vehicles only. It is a busy stretch of road: about 25,000 people walk between Grenfell Street and North Terrace daily.

Gawler Place continues north of North Terrace, downhill, as Kintore Avenue. The State Library of South Australia and the University of Adelaide are on the east and the South Australian National War Memorial, Government House and Torrens Parade Ground are on the west. The road ends at its intersection with Victoria Drive, which runs alongside the Torrens Lake.

=== Junctions ===
Location	km	mi	Destinations	Notes
Adelaide city centre	−0.45	−0.28	Victoria Drive	As Kintore Avenue
Adelaide city centre	0.0	0.0	North Terrace	
Adelaide city centre	0.15	0.093	Rundle Mall	
Adelaide city centre	0.30	0.19	Grenfell Street	
Adelaide city centre	0.45	0.28	Pirie Street	
Adelaide city centre	0.60	0.37	Flinders Street	
Adelaide city centre	0.80	0.50	Wakefield Street	
1.000 mi = 1.609 km; 1.000 km = 0.621 mi
