= Kostas Makris =

Greek Australian businessman (born 1943)

Con Makris Κώστας Μακρής
- Born: 1945 (age 80–81); Ligourio, Greece
- Occupations: Businessman & Real Estate
- Known for: Owner of Makris Group
- Children: 4

Kostas "Con" Makris (Greek: Κώστας Μακρής) is a Greek Australian businessman with a fortune of over AUD$1.03 billion occupying the 176th place in the 2026 Australian Financial Review Review Rich List list.

== Early life ==
He was born in Ligourio, Greece. Soon his family moved to Holargos where he grew up. Makris' early years were pretty hard, and so he began to work when he was only 12 years old. He emigrated to Australia in 1963 at the age of 16 to make money and eventually return to Greece.

Initially he worked in the foundry and later on he bought a string of fast food restaurants, then he moved to the property industry. Today his private company the Makris Group, holds property assets including Marina Mirage and Oracle Boulevard on the Gold Coast, Endeavour Hills in Melbourne, and Marina Pier and Gilles Plains in Adelaide.

== Business ==
Makris made his fortune from real estate investments in Adelaide. Makris was also the former owner of his childhood Greek football club Panachaiki for a short period of time as he was interested in other business.

== See also ==
- Makris Group
