= Australia's Next Top Model season 9 =

Australia's Next Top Model
- Season 9
- Judges: Jennifer Hawkins; Alex Perry
- No. of contestants: 13
- Winner: Brittany Beattie
- No. of episodes: 10

Release
- Original network: Fox8
- Original release: 30 April – 2 July 2015

Season chronology
- ← Previous; Season 8 Next → Season 10

The ninth cycle of Australia's Next Top Model began airing 30 April 2015 on Fox8. Jennifer Hawkins and Alex Perry returned judges for this season, while Cheyenne Tozzi was added as a new co-mentor alongside Didier Cohen, who was formerly a judge on the previous season.

The prizes for this cycle included a one-year modelling contract with IMG Sydney, a trip to New York City for New York Fashion Week valued at A$20,000 thanks to TRESemmé, a brand new Mazda 2 Genki, and an editorial spread in Elle Australia.

The winner of the competition was 20 year-old Brittany Beattie from Whittlesea, Victoria.

Runner-up Lucy Markovic died of an arteriovenous malformation in April 2025.

== Series summary ==
This series saw 12 new contestants with a thirteenth cast member added in as a wildcard contestant. In contrast to the former two cycles there was no casting episode this season. A new scoring system was implemented on the show, with contestants receiving a score on both the challenges and shoots to determine who would go home. This system replaced the show's previous elimination format, where the name of each contestant was called in order of merit.

=== Requirements ===
All applying contestants were required to be aged 16 to 21 in order to apply for the show. Those auditioning had to be at least 172 centimetres (68 in) tall. To qualify, all applicants had to be an Australian citizen currently living in Australia. Additional requirements stated that a contestant could not have had previous experience as a model in a national campaign within the last five years, and if a contestant was represented by an agent or a manager, she had to terminate that representation prior to the competition.

=== Auditions ===
Auditions were held once in Newcastle, Gold Coast, Adelaide and Perth. They were held in two different venues in Sydney and Melbourne.

In addition to the audition tour, an online selfie competition dubbed 'Australia's Next Top Selfie' was held for models who were unable to show up for the auditions. Applicants were required to submit a photograph tagged #antmselfie on Instagram, Twitter or Facebook. All live audition requirements still applied. The winner of the competition, later revealed on the show to be 18 year-old Zahra Thalari from Sydney, was granted a spot within the final cast.

=== Guest judges ===
Instead of finding a replacement for the late Charlotte Dawson the show opted to include a special guest judge each week. Foxtel Executive Director of Television Brian Walsh explained: "The whole team on the show has been deeply affected by the loss of Charlotte earlier this year. We feel the series will never be the same without her and in 2015 we will welcome a special guest judge each week to join the judging panel as in our minds Charlotte is irreplaceable." The guest judges for this year included Alessandra Ambrosio, Alexandra Agoston, Alyssa Sutherland, Coco Rocha, Elyse Taylor, Jean Paul Gaultier, Kelly Osbourne, Kim Kardashian, Linda Evangelista, Megan Gale, and Tyra Banks.

== Cast ==
=== Contestants ===
(Ages stated are at start of contest)

Contestant	Age	Height	Hometown	Finish	Place
Kaitlyn Bennett	18	175 cm (5 ft 9 in)	Mandurah	Episode 1	13
Cassie Hargrave	18	179 cm (5 ft 10 1/2 in)	Gold Coast	Episode 2	12
Ayieda Malou	17	179 cm (5 ft 10 1/2 in)	Perth	Episode 3	11
Phoebe Deskovic	17	177 cm (5 ft 9 1/2 in)	Sydney	Episode 4	10
Zahra Thalari	18	179 cm (5 ft 10 1/2 in)	Sydney	Episode 5	9
Tanahya Cohen	18	177 cm (5 ft 9 1/2 in)	Caloundra	Episode 5	8
Izi Simundic	21	174 cm (5 ft 8 1/2 in)	Newcastle	Episode 6	7
Jordan Burridge	17	179 cm (5 ft 10 1/2 in)	Gold Coast	Episode 7	6
Lauren Ericson	16	176 cm (5 ft 9 1/2 in)	Melbourne	Episode 8	5
Jess Thomas	18	174 cm (5 ft 8 1/2 in)	Perth	Episode 9	4
Alex Sinadinovic	18	172 cm (5 ft 7 1/2 in)	Wollongong	Episode 9	3
Lucy Markovic †	16	181 cm (5 ft 11 1/2 in)	Gold Coast	Episode 10	2
Brittany Beattie	20	177 cm (5 ft 9 1/2 in)	Whittlesea	Episode 10	1

=== Judges ===
- Jennifer Hawkins (host)
- Alex Perry

=== Other cast members ===
- Cheyenne Tozzi — mentor
- Didier Cohen — mentor

== Episodes ==
No. overall	No. in season	Title	Original release date
88	1	"Episode 1"	30 April 2015
The top twelve contestants met for the first time, and learned that their tasks throughout the competition would be scored in order to determine who would be eliminated each week. The contestants then took on their first challenge, which consisted of a runway show in front of Australia's fashion elite, and later had to pose in front of the camera for an au naturel black and white photo shoot, mentored by Victoria's Secret model Alessandra Ambrosio.: Special guests: Alessandra Ambrosio; Featured photographer: Gary Heery
89	2	"Episode 2"	7 May 2015
The top eleven contestants were paired off as correspondents for the Kardashian Kollection and had to take Instagram selfies in order to impress Kim Kardashian. The winner of the challenge was chosen by Kim to have her photograph posted in her personal instagram account with over 30 million followers, as well as the official Kardashian Kollection instagram. At the shoot, each contestant was assigned a different persona uniquely tailored to their individual personality. After the week's elimination ceremony, Jennifer Hawkins revealed that a new contestant, Zahra, would be entering the competition.: Special guests: Kim Kardashian, Kelly Osbourne; Featured photographer: Nick Scott
90	3	"Episode 3"	14 May 2015
The top eleven contestants were flown to Melbourne for a red carpet event and challenge celebrating the opening night of Jean Paul Gaultier's exhibition, where they faced an interview with members of the press regarding their personal style. For the photo shoot the contestants were taken to Hosier Lane, and had to pose wearing gowns designed by Jean Paul Gaultier. Following the elimination ceremony, guest judge Jean Paul Gaultier surprised the group by inviting one of the models to walk in one of his upcoming shows during Paris Fashion week.: Special guests: Jean Paul Gaultier; Featured photographer: Nick Leary
91	4	"Episode 4"	21 May 2015
The top ten contestants received makeovers, and had a photo shoot challenge for TRESemmé that doubled as a mock campaign for the brand. The contestants were later taken to Bondi Beach for a couture swimwear photo shoot with male models, where they were introduced to Elyse Taylor.: Special guests: Joh Bailey, Mineli Galiano, Elyse Taylor; Featured photographer: Travis Grace
92	5	"Episode 5"	28 May 2015
The top nine contestants were divided into teams of three for a challenge in which they had to star in a digital campaign for Jennifer Hawkins' tanning brand, Jbronze. On set for the photo shoot, the contestants were introduced to supermodel Linda Evangelista. Their task was to recreate a 90s white shirt photo, a classic of the era of supermodels.: Special guests: Linda Evangelista; Featured photographer: Pierre Toussaint
93	6	"Episode 6"	4 June 2015
The top seven contestants were challenged to walk in a vertical runway show for Miss Shop Australia to win a shopping spree valued at $5,000 as well as the opportunity of being featured in the S/S 16 Miss Shop launch campaign. The contestants were later driven to Valvoline Raceway to shoot an eight-page editorial that would be published in the pages of Cosmopolitan magazine, and Alexandra Agoston was introduced as the guest judge for the week. Two of the contestants deadlocked whilst in the bottom two at elimination, and the judges had to vote among themselves in order to break the tie.: Special guests: Nicole Adolphe, Alexandra Agoston; Featured photographer: Richard Freeman
94	7	"Episode 7"	11 June 2015
The top six contestants were taken to the Mazda headquarters in Sydney to become brand ambassadors and spokespersons for the brand. Their challenge consisted of coming up with an exiting sales pitch for the new Mazda 2 to win a cash prize of $5,000. Alyssa Sutherland later posed with the contestants in a Fight Club inspired photo shoot session, before sitting at panel as the week's guest judge.: Special guests: Alastair Doak, Jaylee Osborne, Alyssa Sutherland; Featured photographer: Simon Upton
95	8	"Episode 8"	18 June 2015
The top five contestants took part in a two-part challenge for Colgate Optic White, consisting of a screen test and a conveyor belt runway show. The winner of the challenge was chosen to front one of Colgate's upcoming campaigns. The theme for that week's photo shoot was a VIP after-party photographed by Georges Antoni. On set, the contestants were introduced to Megan Gale.: Special guests: Tina Kim, Brad Stapleton, Megan Gale; Featured photographer: Georges Antoni
96	9	"Episode 9"	25 June 2015
Jennifer Hawkins announced that the competition would be heading overseas to New York City. The top four contestants attended go sees in which they had to impress clients at the offices of Swarovski jewelry and Elle magazine before heading to IMG. The winner of the challenge was chosen to participate in a photo shoot for Swarovski's Multifacets magazine, and received $2,000 worth of jewelry from the brand. Later, the contestants were introduced to supermodel Coco Rocha for a lesson on posing. Former America's Next Top Model judge and The Face host Nigel Barker met the contestants for a photo shoot in the Meatpacking District of Manhattan wearing conceptual fashion. At panel, it was revealed that only the final two would advance to the finale.: Special guests: Anne Slowey, Nathalie Colin, David Cunningham, Coco Rocha, Nick Hudson; Featured photographer: Nigel Barker
97	10	"Episode 10"	2 July 2015
The final two shot for a mock cover and their winning editorial spread to be published in the August issue of Elle Australia. The formerly eliminated contestants returned for a runway show at Carriageworks, where Top Model creator Tyra Banks made an appearance as the cycles' final guest judge. After the runway show, the judges deliberated over the final two's covers, and Brittany was crowned as the ninth winner of Australia's Next Top Model.: Special guests: Justine Cullen, Tyra Banks; Featured photographer: Pierre Toussaint

== Results ==
=== Elimination table ===
Order	Episodes									
Order	1	2	3 (Note: In episode 3, Brittany and Lauren tied for highest score. Zahra entered the competition at the end of panel in episode 2, and therefore didn't receive her first score until this episode.)	4	5 (Note: In episode 5, there was a double elimination. Zahra was eliminated after she placed lower than Alex on the leaderboard, who was last at the time. Despite scoring higher than Zahra, Tanahya was also unable to score higher than Alex.)	6 (Note: In episode 6, Izi and Lucy had a tied lowest score of 25.5, and the judges had to vote to save one of them from elimination. Jen and Alex voted to save Lucy, giving her 2/3 of the votes required to stay safe and eliminating Izi from the competition.)	7	8	9 (Note: In episode 9, there was a double elimination. Jess was eliminated after Lucy placed above her on the leaderboard. Despite scoring higher than Jess, Alex was unable to score higher than Lucy.)	10
1	Alex	Lucy	Brittany	Jess	Jordan	Alex	Lucy	Lucy	Brittany	Brittany
2	Brittany	Alex	Lauren	Brittany	Jess	Brittany	Lauren	Alex	Lucy	Lucy
3	Izi	Izi	Alex	Alex	Lauren	Lauren	Alex	Brittany	Alex	
4	Ayieda	Tanahya	Lucy	Izi	Lucy	Jess	Brittany	Jess	Jess	
5	Tanahya	Ayieda	Izi	Jordan	Brittany	Jordan	Jess	Lauren		
6	Jess	Jess	Phoebe	Lucy	Izi	Lucy	Jordan			
7	Lucy	Jordan	Tanahya	Lauren	Alex	Izi				
8	Lauren	Lauren	Jess	Zahra	Tanahya					
9	Phoebe	Brittany	Jordan	Tanahya	Zahra					
10	Jordan	Phoebe	Zahra	Phoebe						
11	Cassie	Cassie	Ayieda							
12	Kaitlyn									

The contestant was eliminated
The contestant was tied at the bottom two with the lowest score, but was not eliminated
The contestant won the competition.

=== Bottom two/three ===
Episode	Contestants	Eliminated
1	Cassie & Kaitlyn	Kaitlyn
2	Cassie & Phoebe	Cassie
3	Ayieda & Zahra	Ayieda
4	Phoebe & Tanahya	Phoebe
5	Alex & Zahra	Zahra
5	Alex & Tanahya	Tanahya
6	Izi & Lucy	Izi
7	Jess & Jordan	Jordan
8	Jess & Lauren	Lauren
9	Alex, Brittany, Jess & Lucy	Jess
9	Alex, Brittany, Jess & Lucy	Alex
10	Brittany & Lucy	Lucy

== Average call-out order ==
Final two is not included.

Rank by average	Place	Model	Call-out total	Number of call-outs	Call-out average
1	3	Alex	25	9	2.78
2	1	Brittany	30	9	3.33
3	2	Lucy	32	9	3.56
4	4	Jess	40	9	4.33
5	7	Izi	28	6	4.67
6	5	Lauren	38	8	4.75
7	6	Jordan	43	7	6.14
8	8	Tanahya	33	5	6.60
9	11	Ayieda	20	3	6.67
10	10	Phoebe	35	4	8.75
11	9	Zahra	27	3	9.00
12	12	Cassie	22	2	11.00
13	13	Kaitlyn	12	1	12.00

=== Scores table ===
Order	Episodes											
Order	1	2	3	4	5	6	7	8	9	10	Total Score	Average Score
Brittany	32.0	27.0	34.0	33.5	34.0	29.0	33.0	35.0	32.0	30.0	319.5	31.95
Lucy	28.0	33.0	29.5	29.0	34.5	25.5	36.5	36.0	29.5	29.0	310.5	31.05
Alex	35.0	31.5	30.5	32.5	29.5	29.5	34.0	35.5	29.0		287.0	31.89
Jess	28.5	28.5	26.0	35.0	34.5	26.5	32.5	32.0	28.5		272.0	30.22
Lauren	26.0	28.0	34.0	28.5	34.5	27.0	34.5	30.5			243.0	30.38
Jordan	24.0	28.0	25.5	31.0	35.5	26.5	30.0				200.5	28.64
Izi	31.5	30.0	28.5	32.5	30.5	25.5					178.5	29.75
Tanahya	30.0	29.5	28.0	23.0	27.5						138.0	27.60
Zahra			23.5	23.5	26.5						73.5	24.50
Phoebe	25.0	24.0	28.0	21.5							98.5	24.63
Ayieda	30.5	29.0	22.0								81.5	27.17
Cassie	22.0	22.5									44.5	22.25
Kaitlyn	20.5										20.5	20.50

The contestant had the highest total score
The contestant was in danger of elimination
The contestant had the lowest total score and was eliminated
The contestant was tied at the bottom two with the lowest score, but was not eliminated
The contestant had the highest total score and won the competition

=== Photoshoot guide ===
- Episode 1 photo shoot: Simplistic B&W portraits
- Episode 2 photo shoot: Showcasing personalities
- Episode 3 photo shoot: Wearing Jean Paul Gaultier designs at Hosier Lane
- Episode 4 photo shoot: Swimwear at Bondi Beach with male models
- Episode 5 photo shoot: Peter Lindbergh inspired white shirt editorial in groups
- Episode 6 photo shoot: Motocross editorial for Cosmopolitan
- Episode 7 photo shoot: Fight Club with Alyssa Sutherland
- Episode 8 photo shoot: Glamorous VIP after-party
- Episode 9 photo shoot: Avant-garde designs in the streets of New York City
- Episode 10 photo shoot: Elle editorial

=== Makeovers ===
- Phoebe - Lara Bingle short light brown angled line
- Zahra - Trimmed and dyed black
- Tanahya - Dyed blonde and cut medium angled line and bangs layered
- Izi - Cut long angled line, middle part and bangs added
- Jordan - Diana Ross inspired tight curls trimmed and dyed brown
- Lauren - Dyed blonde and trimmed
- Jess - Dyed dark red and layers
- Alexandra - Nadja Auermann light blonde and layers with bangs layered
- Lucy - Dyed chocolate brown and cut shoulder length
- Brittany - Dyed dark brown with red highlights and loose curly weave

== Post–Top Model careers ==
- Kaitlyn Bennett did not continue modeling after the show.
- Cassie Hargrave signed with Dallys Models. She has taken a couple of test shots and modeled for Curly & Blonde Hairdresser, and Ivie White. She has appeared on magazine cover and editorials for Normal France, Bisous US #20 Spring 2017, Livid US #19 March 2017, Dreamingless UK March 2017, En Vie Japan June 2017, Everafter #5 SS18. Hargrave retired from modeling in 2020.
- Ayieda Malou signed with IMG Models. She has taken a couple of test shots, appeared on magazine editorials for Kiss Me Stupid October 2015 and modeled for Circle Park Collective, Vivid Dresses AU, Eastland Shopping Centre. She retired from modeling in 2018.
- Phoebe Deskovic signed with Jaz Daly Management, Kult Model Management and Priscilla's Model Management. She has taken a couple of test shots and walked in fashion show for Romance Was Born FW23. She has modeled for Bonds, Pandora, Romance Was Born, My Chameleon FW15, Carousel Essentials, Anna Quan, Lonely Lingerie, Lala Berlin SS16, Cara Mia Vintage, Ginia, Tuchuzy Store, Holly Ryan Jewellery, Huffer New Zealand, Sarah & Sebastian, Gritty Pretty, P.E Nation, Double Rainbouu, Levi's Pride 2020, Camilla With Love, Stine Goya Pre-Fall 2020, Aje. Clothing, All Is A Gentle Spring, and appeared on magazine cover and editorials for In Print, Love Want, The Journal November 2015, Vulkan US January 2016, Elle Denmark October 2016, Peachy Keen May 2018, Nasty Italia October 2019, Harper's Bazaar December 2019, Russh #91 February 2020, Vogue April 2020, Wül Germany May 2020, Black New Zealand August 2020, Elbazin March 2021. Deskovic retired from modeling in 2022.
- Zahra Thalari did not modeling after the show.
- Tanahya Cohen signed with Vivien's Model Management. She has taken a couple of test shots and modeled for Lazy Girl Lingerie, Adrienne Reid Summer 2018. She has walked in fashion shows of Plein Sport FW17, Brunello Cucinelli FW17, Camilla With Love, George Wu Couture, Pacific Fair, White Label Noba, Bianca Spender, Kokoswim, and appeared on magazine cover and editorials for Rouge US March 2016, South City Bulletin #82 October 2016, Brisbane News #1211 January–February 2019. Cohen retired from modeling in 2020.
- Izi Simundic signed with Scoop Model Management, Giant Management, Chic Management, Balistarz Productions in Bali, Leni's Model Management in London and Independent Model Management in Milan. She has taken a couple of test shots, modeled for Bonds, Armani Beauty, Dotti, Kérastase Greece, Trelise Cooper, Sarah-Jane Clarke, G-Star Raw, Tigerlily Swimwear, AM Eyewear, Glue Store, Asara Swim, The Bare Road, Nice Martin, Sancia The Label Resort 2016, Auguste The Label, P.E Nation, Cantik Swimwear, Calli The Label, Yöli & Otis Summer 2017, Sir The Label, Pfeiffer the Label, Vestiaire Collective, The East Order, Alice McCall SS18, Sofia The Label, Stevie May AU Summer 2018, Tony Bianco Summer 2018, La Maison Talulah, MLM Label, Hannah Artwear, Lioness Fashion, Grace Love Lace, Chaumet Jewellery, SWF Boutique, Splice Boutique, Tuchuzy Store, Shona Joy, and appeared on magazine cover and editorials for Dolly November 2015, Real Living March 2016, Bride to Be May 2016, Editorialist May 2016, Modern Wedding May 2016, Hunter Wedding January 2017, Elléments US June 2018, Women's Fitness March 2018, Contra December 2018, Sunday Life April 2019, Ruusk April 2019, Badland Journal November 2019, OK! December 2019, Astrophe June 2020.
- Jordan Burridge signed with Que Models. She has taken a couple of test shots and modeled for The Iconic, Loveloxx Hair & Extensions, Good Studios, I Love Linen. She retired from modeling in 2021.
- Lauren Ericson signed with Scoop Model Management, Chadwick Models and Vivien's Model Management. She has taken a couple of test shots and appeared on magazine editorials for Vogue, Tantalum US July 2016. She has modeled for Sass & Bide, Dotti, Sportsgirl, Bonds, Tiger Mist, Indie & I, Virgo & Her Boutique, Lé Buns, Jason Grech, Popcherry AU, Elliatt Collective, Oglia-Loro Couture, Asilio World, Eleven Australia, Doyoueven Women, Korrflex, Jaggad Activewear, Aleksa Karina Bridal, Cali Rae, VM Swim, Ishka Handcrafts. Ericson retired from modeling in 2022.
- Jess Thomas signed with IMG Models and Red 11 Model Management in Auckland. She has taken a couple of test shots and walked in fashion shows of David Jones, Serpent & The Swan, Karla Špetić, Lee Mathews, Monster Alphabets Resort 2017. She has modeled for Sportsgirl, Supré, Lee, The Iconic, Moochi New Zealand, Keepsake The Label, Rue Stiic, Jane Yeh Design, Westfield Group FW16, Natalie Marie Jewellery, Allerton Swimwear, La Maison Talulah, Rubi Shoes, Twosixworld, We Are Kindred, Auguste The Label, Voodoo Hosiery, Beau Coops FW17, Kelleigh Hair, Zamel's Jewellery, Nude By Nature, and appeared on magazine cover and editorials for Russh, Laud, Together Journal, Sauce New Zealand, Trend Privé US, MBFF Sydney September 2015, Oyster October 2015, Teen Eye US #3 Fall 2015, Weddings New Zealand January 2016, Zeum Canada March 2016, Sicky US March 2016, Dolly April 2016, Folkr France June 2016, Priceline AU Summer 2016, Factice France #13 Summer 2017, Vogue October 2018, Instyle Hair January–February 2020. Thomas retired from modeling in 2021.
- Alex Sinadinovic signed with Scoop Model Management and Début Management. She has taken a couple of test shots and appeared on magazine editorials for Zephyr #3 October 2015, Noctis UK August 2017. She has modeled for Alice McCall, Raw Edge Boutique, Ixiah The Label, Gingham & Heels, Novo Shoes SS16, Frost You AU, Milivine Boutique, Shop Market HQ, Nice Martin, Fawnstar Jewelry, Bombah Hair, Estide Swimwear, Zachary The Label, I Am Gia, Bernie Thomas. Sinadinovic retired from modeling in 2020.
- Lucy Markovic signed with IMG Models, Kult Model Management, Priscilla's Model Management, Marilyn Agency in New York City, Fabbrica Milano Management in Milan, Wilhelmina Models in London, Select Model Management in Paris & London, Elite Model Management in New York City & Los Angeles. She has modeled for Versace, The Iconic, Victoria Beckham, Urban Outfitters, Isabelle Quinn, Le Specs, One Teaspoon, Jamie My Love AU, Order Of Style, C/Meo Collective, Shona Joy, Elliatt Collective, Running Bare, Asilio World, Mecca Max, Song For The Mute, Alias Mae SS22, Adidas SS23, Anna Quan Resort 2023, With Jéan, Safiyaa UK FW23, Cult Gaia US Resort 2024, Dsquared2 SS24, Emporio Armani SS24, Beymen Turkey SS24, L'Idée SS24, La Mania Fashion Poland FW24, AllSaints FW24, and walked in fashion shows of Oscar de la Renta, Georges Hobeika, Versace, Bulgari, Giambattista Valli, Emporio Armani, Giorgio Armani, Brandon Maxwell, Carla Zampatti SS16, Chanel Pre-Fall 2016, Toni Maticevski Resort 2017, By Johnny Resort 2017, Bec & Bridge Resort 2017, Daniel Avakian Resort 2017, Cynthia Rowley Resort 2017, Aqua Blu AU Resort 2017, Duskii Resort 2017, Palm Swimwear Resort 2017, Elisabetta Franchi SS18, Alice McCall Resort 2022, Mariam Seddiq Resort 2022, Rebecca Vallance Resort 2022, Givenchy SS23, Dion Lee FW23, Dolce & Gabbana FW23, Bally RTW Fall 2023, Bulgari Mediterranea High Jewelry Event Show 2023, Staud SS24, Philipp Plein FW24. She has appeared on magazine cover and editorials for Shop Til' You Drop June 2016, LAB A4 July 2016, Dolly August 2016, Marie Claire August 2017, Alice.D December 2020, Sleek US April 2022, Schön! UK October 2022, To Be #4 October 2022, Vogue South Korea July 2023, Vogue Singapore July–August 2023, Amica Italia September 2023, Heroine UK #19 October 2023, Numéro Netherlands January 2024, Vanity Fair Italia #21-22 May 2024, W October 2024, Vogue Hong Kong November 2024, Grey Italia November 2024. In 2025, she was diagnosed with an arteriovenous malformation (AVM) and died on 11 April after being hospitalized due to bleeding in the brain.
- Brittany Beattie has collected her prizes and signed with IMG Models. She is also signed with Vivien's Model Management, has taken a couple of test shots and walked in fashion show for Witchery SS16. She has modeled for Sass & Bide, One Teaspoon, Alex Perry SS16, Grace Melbourne, Ford, and appeared on magazine cover and editorials for Elle August 2015, Fashion Journal #149 August 2015, Harper's Bazaar September 2015. Beattie retired from modeling in 2018.

== Viewership ==
No.	Title	Air date	Overnight ratings		Ref(s)
No.	Title	Air date	Viewers	Rank	Ref(s)
1	Episode 1	30 April 2015	123,000	1	
2	Episode 2	7 May 2015	68,000	4	
3	Episode 3	14 May 2015	105,000	1	
4	Episode 4	21 May 2015	88,000	2	
5	Episode 5	28 May 2015	103,000	2	
6	Episode 6	4 June 2015	106,000	1	
7	Episode 7	11 June 2015	96,000	1	
8	Episode 8	18 June 2015	115,000	2	
9	Episode 9	25 June 2015	111,000	3	
10	Episode 10	2 July 2015	139,000	2	
