= Philip Smouha =

Philip Smouha (born May 3, 1952) was the owner of Smouha Fabrics Group. He was married to fashion designer Lisa Ho and has worked in the fashion industry for over 40 years.

Born in Sydney, Australia, his main business was Smouha Fabrics, a fabric importer and family business. In his capacity there he worked with designers Lisa Ho, Sass and Bide, Alice McCall, Supre, and others. He also owned Hills Textiles and brewery Lucky Drink Company. Due to the 2008 financial crisis, the three businesses went into voluntary administration in March 2009. He has handled the crisis by selling off a number of his properties, both business and personal, to pay creditors. His Bellevue Hill home was sold for 17 million AUD in 2009.
