= Nigel Austin =

Australian entrepreneur

- Born: 24 September 1970 (age 55)
- Occupation: Entrepreneur
- Employer: Cotton On Group
- Spouse: Tania Austin (m. 2008, divorced) Melanie Austin
- Children: 6

Nigel Austin (born 24 September 1970) is an Australian business and horse racing entrepreneur. Austin is the founder and 90% majority owner of the Cotton On Group clothing and stationery group with brands including Cotton On, Supre, Factorie and Typo.

== Early life ==
Austin grew up in Geelong, Victoria. Austin's late father, Grant Austin, ran a publicly traded clothing wholesale and import business called the Austin Group, where Austin started out learning about the fashion industry in his school holidays. From the age of 8 he knew he wanted to work in retail and looked up to his father.

In 1988, at the Beckley Markets in Geelong, Austin started selling acid-washed denim jackets from the boot of his Ford Bronco car. In his first outing at the market he sold one jacket for $30. The following week he returned with a cheaper offer, after he negotiated with his father who was the supplier, which resulted in all 20 selling out. Austin enrolled in university to study business but dropped out after a year to focus on his growing garment business. He didn't tell his father that he had dropped out for an entire year and could prove his business was booming.

== Career ==
In 1991, Austin's first store was small space in Geelong behind a butcher shop run by his grandfather and he sourced merchandise from his father. He told Forbes: "The rent was $110 a week; the philosophy [was to] keep the risk as low as possible. My goal for the first year was to make $2,000 a week. If I could make [that] then I could make $100,000 a year.". His cousin, Ashley Hardwick, joined his venture a year later and they raised enough money to open more stores largely leveraging his father's supply connections. Some of those connections still work with his company to this day. It took fifteen years for the group to expand to more than fifty stores across Australia, and today stores are found around the world. The first international store was in New Zealand and has since been followed by locations such as South Africa, Malaysia, Hong Kong and USA.

Austin and the Cotton On Group started the Cotton On Foundation to support healthcare and education in nations such as Uganda. The foundation was started after the baptism of Austin's first son in 2007, when he was asked by the local Parish in Geelong to make a donation to a healthcare centre in the small village of Mannya in Southern Uganda. Money is raised through selling specially branded merchandise in group stores such as bracelets, water bottles and tote bags.

== Personal life ==
Austin has six children, three of those born with ex-wife Tania Austin who is the CEO of women's fashion brand, Decjuba. His current wife is Melanie Austin.

Austin is involved in horse racing and owns Rosemont Stud, over 566 hectares (1,400 acres) in Gnarwarre and Ceres, Victoria. The logo of the stud is a red and white gatecrasher, that originally was the logo for the Cotton On chain in its early years.

=== Net worth ===
In 2017, Forbes Asia assessed Austin's net worth at US$1.36 billion. As of May 2025, The Australian Financial Review assessed his net worth at A$2.42 billion.

| Year | Australian Financial Review Rich List | | Forbes Australia's 50 Richest | |
| Year | Rank | Net worth (AUD) | Rank | Net worth (USD) |
|---|---|---|---|---|
| 2017 | | | | $1.36 billion ▲ |
| 2018 | 32 | $1.96 billion ▲ | | |
| 2019 | 27 ▲ | $2.68 billion ▲ | | |
| 2020 | 49 ▼ | $1.92 billion ▼ | | |
| 2021 | 57 ▼ | $1.93 billion ▲ | | |
| 2022 | 50 ▲ | $2.00 billion ▲ | | |
| 2023 | 56 ▼ | $2.00 billion | | |
| 2024 | 59 ▲ | $2.43 billion ▲ | | |
| 2025 | 67 ▼ | $2.42 billion ▼ | | |

Legend
| Icon | Description |
|---|---|
| Steady | Has not changed from the previous year |
| ▲ | Has increased from the previous year |
| ▼ | Has decreased from the previous year |
