= Lameka Fox =

American fashion model from Maryland

- Born: Maryland, U.S.
- Occupation: Model
- Years active: 2016–present
- Modeling information
- Height: 5 ft 9 1/2 in (1.77 m)
- Hair color: Brown
- Eye color: Brown
- Agency: IMG Models (Atlanta); The Lions (New York); PARS Management (Munich); Stockholmsgruppen (Stockholm); The Lions (New York); Select Model (London, Milan, Paris, Stockholm, Atlanta, Chicago, Los Angeles, Miami)

Lameka Fox is an American fashion model from Maryland.

== Biography ==
In May 2015, she was signed by IMG Models after being scouted through their We Love Your Genes (#WLYG) campaign which scouted girls globally via Instagram.

Fox made her debut as a model on the runway during Paris, London, Milan and New York fashion weeks, opening the Yeezy SS/17 show at New York Fashion Week. Fox has walked the runway for designer including Maison Valentino, Tommy Hilfiger, Marc Jacobs, Rodarte, Kenzo, Miu Miu, Coach, Burberry, Stella McCartney, and Julien Macdonald.

She also starred in a Tommy Hilfiger Campaign alongside Gigi Hadid. In 2016, Fox walked the runway during the Victoria's Secret Fashion Show in Paris, 2017 in Shanghai and 2018 in New York City

Lameka Fox has featured in editorials in magazines including Elle, Interview, Vogue and Teen Vogue. In March 2017, Fox featured on the cover of Harper's Bazaar Arabia and in September, she also appeared on the cover of Harper's Bazaar Vietnam, as part of a cover series alongside Shanina Shaik, Elyse Taylor, Chanel Iman, Hilary Rhoda and Tobias Sorensen.
