= Elyse Taylor =

Australian model

- Born: 20 October 1986 (age 40); Vaucluse, New South Wales, Australia
- Occupation: Model
- Modeling information
- Height: 1.75 m (5 ft 9 in)
- Hair color: Blonde
- Eye color: Blue
- Agency: One Management (New York); IMG Models (Paris, Sydney); Traffic Models (Barcelona); Louisa Models (Munich); Modellink (Stockholm)

Elyse Taylor (born 20 October 1986) is an Australian model. She is a brand ambassador for makeup and skincare brand Nude by Nature and has walked in the Victoria's Secret Fashion Show.

== Career ==
In 2004, at the age of 18, Taylor was introduced to modelling by one of her friends who was a model who encouraged her to begin a career in the modelling industry. Taylor was signed to Chic Models in the same year, a modelling agency based in Australia. Chic management became her first modelling agency following her introduction to the owner of the agency Ursula Hufnagel. Taylor chose to pursue a career in modelling where she specialises in runway, swimwear and lingerie modelling. During her time signed to Chic Models, Taylor appeared on the cover of GQ Magazine Australia alongside Pania Rose and Sarah Stephens in 2009.

Taylor received her first solo front page cover on October 6, 2009, when she posed on the cover of Vogue Australia.

=== International Success ===
In 2009, she became the fifth Victoria's Secret model from Australia. Taylor walked in the show as a newcomer as part of its Segment 3: PINK Planet portion. Taylor walked alongside models Behati Prinsloo, Candice Swanepoel and Erin Heatherton who wore the wings for this segment.

Taylors has also taken part in international features for international brands globally including featuring on the cover for British GQ on 28 January 2010. Taylor was shot for the front page cover of the British GQ editorial issue by Gavin Bond.

Taylor has been involved in other campaigns for many other international brands. She has been a part of campaigns for international brands Dolce & Gabbana, Bottega Venta, Tommy Hilfiger, Moschino and Estee Lauder where she has walked on runways for these brands. Additionally, Taylor has shot for Max Azria's clothing line BCBG, for David Jones and for Guess by Marciano.

Taylor has featured in campaigns for Australian fashion brand Kensie and walked in the 2009 Victoria's Secret Fashion Show. In 2011, she was named the face of surf brand O'Neill. As the ambassador of the brand, Taylor was chosen to judge the O'Neill Model Search.

Taylor has appeared on covers for Flair, an Arabic magazine, ELLE Magazine in Sweden, SURE in South Korea, Glamour magazine, V Magazine in the United States, Purple Magazine, Pop magazine and Dazed & Confused magazine in the United Kingdom. In 2015, Taylor appeared as a guest judge on cycle 9 of Australia's Next Top Model.

=== Brand Ambassador ===
In 2010, Taylor became a brand ambassador for O’Neill Girls, an Australian surf and swimwear clothing brand. Taylor was announced as the official brand ambassador for their Spring 2011 collections. As part of her collaboration with O’Neill Girls, Taylor also launched an exclusive swimwear collection with the branch in 2011 after the Spring collection launch. The “One Way Runway”was launched in Ibiza on June 9th 2013. Additionally, Taylor was a judge for O’Neill Girls model search in 2012. As the brand ambassador, Taylor was chosen by the brand to pick a model for the brand as part of a nationwide model search.

In 2015, Taylor became the brand ambassador for Nude by Nature for its natural beauty campaign. As part of Nude by Nature’s campaign to embrace natural beauty to reflect the emerging standard of beauty held by the brand, the Sydney based brand chose Taylor as its ambassador for their Natural beauty campaign. Taylor was chosen as she “embodies natural Australian beauty” according to Kristina Kunkel, the brands Nature marketing and product development director.

In September 2017, she appeared on the cover of Harper's Bazaar Vietnam, as part of a cover series alongside Shanina Shaik, Lameka Fox, Chanel Iman, Hilary Rhoda and Tobias Sorensen.

== Controversy ==
On 8 October 2014, Taylor was involved in an internet controversy on the social media platform Instagram with Plus Size model Jessica Lewis due to inappropriate usage of language. Taylor was criticised for comments she made in response to an image posted by Lewis in regards to body inclusivity in the modelling industry. Taylor was criticised for the language she had used in response to the image where she referred to Lewis using a derogatory word. Taylor has since spoken about body inclusivity in the modelling industry. Taylor has spoken in support of the diversity of body figures and ethnicity in the industry as well as its importance.

== Personal life ==
In 2012, Taylor began dating businessman Seth Campbell. After two years of their relationship, Taylor gave birth to their daughter Lila Louise in 2014 in New York. The couple were married in the same year at Campbells’ family estate outside of New York city. Taylor wore a wedding dress designed by American Fashion Designer Zac Posen. In 2016, Taylor and Campbell filed for a divorced and were divorced within the same year.
