= Smouha (surname) =

Smouha is a surname. Notable people with the surname include:

- Edward Smouha (1908–1992), British sprinter
- Joseph Smouha (born 1961), Egyptian businessman
- Philip Smouha (born 1952), Australian businessman
