= Brittany Beattie =

Australian model

- Born: Brittany Lee Beattie; 11 December 1994 (age 31); Whittlesea, Victoria, Australia
- Occupation: Model
- Years active: 2015–2017
- Modeling information
- Height: 5 ft 9 1/2 in (177 cm)
- Hair color: Dark brown
- Eye color: Hazel
- Agency: IMG Sydney

Brittany Beattie (born 11 December 1994) is an Australian former model, best known for winning cycle 9 of Australia's Next Top Model.

== Early life ==
Beattie was born in the suburb of Whittlesea, Victoria, and lived with her parents before dropping out of school at the age of 16. After completing a civil construction course, she worked as a truck driver working on tractors and excavators as part of her uncle's Bobcat business. In her teens, Beattie was offered representation by an agency in Melbourne but declined the offer, believing she was not fit for the job.

== Australia's Next Top Model ==
In August 2014, Beattie attended one of the two rounds of auditions in Melbourne for the ninth season of Australia's Next Top Model, where several of the judges took notice of her. She was later selected to become one of the thirteen contestants for the ninth series.

On the third week of the show, Beattie was selected to walk for guest judge and designer Jean Paul Gaultier during Paris Fashion Week for his A/W show in 2015. During a round of casting sessions in New York City, she was also chosen for work with Swarovski, appearing in an advertorial for their Multifacets magazine.

Beattie was crowned as the winner in the tenth week of the competition, defeating Gold Coast contestant Lucy Markovic. As the winner of the competition Beattie received a 12-month contract with IMG Models in Sydney, a trip to New York City for New York Fashion Week valued at twenty thousand dollars thanks to TRESemmé, a brand new Mazda 2 Genki, as well as being featured in an editorial spread for Elle Australia.

== Career ==
Shortly before her editorial spread was published in the August issue of Elle Australia, Beattie shot for Westfield Australia's S/S 2015 campaign and disclosed plans to move to Sydney in order to be closer to her agency. In July 2015, she walked for Witchery's S/S 2016 launch and shot for the August issue of Fashion Journal magazine. She was also featured in a billboard campaign for Australian denim brand One Teaspoon for their Le Punk collection, and shot in an online editorial for Harper's Bazaar wearing designs from Alex Perry's Black Swan collection. She also had a photo shoot for Alex Perry's S/S 2016 lookbook and appeared in a commercial for Ford Australia in October 2015.

Preceded by Melissa Juratowitch	Australia's Next Top Model winner Cycle 9 (2015)	Succeeded by Aleyna FitzGerald
