= Cotton On Group =

Australian multinational retail company

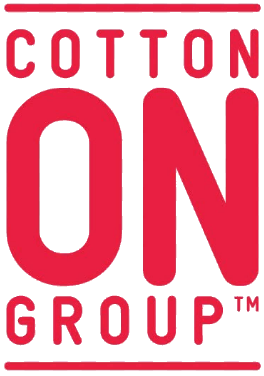

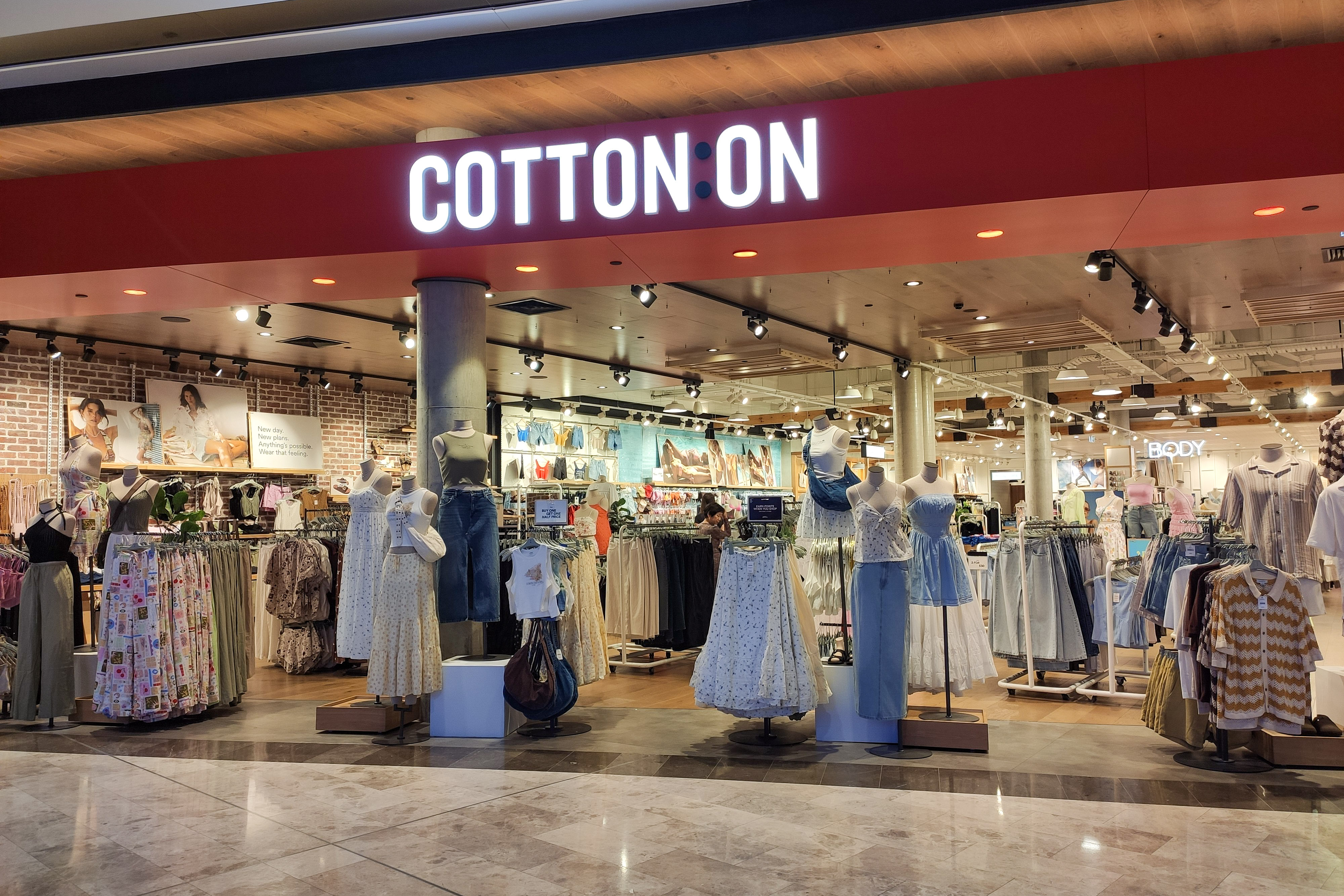
- Cotton On store in Westfield Carousel
- Type: Private
- Industry: Textile; Homeware; Stationery
- Founded: 1991; 35 years ago
- Founder: Nigel Austin
- Headquarters: Geelong, Australia
- Number of locations: 1,298 (2025)
- Area served: Worldwide
- Key people: Nigel Austin (Managing Director and Founder); Peter Johnson (CEO - Cotton On (Cotton On Adults, Cotton On Kids, Cotton On Body, Rubi); Natalie McLean (CEO - Emerging Brands (Factorie, Supré, Typo, Ceres); Stuart Higgins (CEO - Community Projects); Michael Hardwick (CFO)
- Products: Clothing, decorative arts, sportswear
- Brands: List: Cotton On; Cotton On Kids; Cotton On Body; Factorie; Typo; Rubi; Supré; Ceres; Cotton On Foundation
- Revenue: A$4.2 billion (2023)
- Number of employees: 22,000 (2023)
- Website: cottonongroup.com.au

Cotton On Group is an Australian retail company known for its fashion, clothing and stationery brands. As of 2020, it has over 1,500 stores in 18 countries employing 22,000 people across eight brands: Cotton On, Cotton On Kids, Cotton On Body, Factorie, Typo, Rubi, Supré, Ceres and Cotton On Foundation.

The design team in the company's Australian office control the steps of production from merchandise planning to establishing specifications, and production is outsourced to approximately 850 suppliers and factories globally. Cotton On Group sources its materials and products from a number of locations worldwide with the majority of its suppliers being located in China, Bangladesh, India and Australia. It also works with suppliers in Sri Lanka, Hong Kong, the United States, and other parts of Asia. These facilities are used for horizontal division of labour, rather than being integrated.

Cotton On is a main sponsor of the Geelong Football Club in the Australian rules football as well as the AFL Women's league for female players.

== History ==
=== 1990s ===
Cotton On was founded by Nigel Austin in 1991, with the first store being opened in Geelong, Australia.

=== 2000s ===
Cotton On Kids launched in 2004. It was followed by Cotton On Body, Factorie and Typo in 2007, and Rubi in 2008. In 2013, Cotton On acquired Australian female youth brand Supré.

Cotton On expanded internationally in 2006, with the opening of its first New Zealand store at Queensgate Shopping Centre, Lower Hutt. It now operates in 19 countries.

=== 2010s ===
In December 2012, Cotton On was fined $1 million for selling highly flammable children's sleepwear misleadingly labeled as low fire danger. The discount clothing retailer, which has more than 900 outlets across the country, was fined $400,000 for selling more than 1000 nightdresses that breached Australian fire safety standards, and a further $400,000 for selling more than 1000 unsafe pairs of girls' pajamas, between September and December 2010. It was fined a further $200,000 for false and misleading labels on both sets of clothing items which claimed they were low fire danger.

In October 2016, Cotton On Group signed a 3-year contract with the AFL Women's League to be the exclusive uniform supplier for all its teams.

In February 2019, Cotton On began selling sex toys on its Australian and New Zealand websites with a content warning.

In July 2019, Four Corners reported Cotton On and several other Australian brands sourced cotton from Xinjiang, and that evidence linked the cotton to forced labour camps. Cotton On ran an internal investigation, and in October 2019, announced it had stopped buying cotton from Xinjiang over concerns of abuse of human rights.

=== 2020s ===
In March 2026, Cotton On Asia Pte Ltd was liquidated and made inactive with no impact on Cotton On Group operations. Reporting on the closure caused widespread confusion in the retail sector with clarification made that Cotton On Group and Cotton On Asia Pte Ltd are two separate holding companies. Cotton On Asia Pte Ltd as a company had undergone rationalisation exercise since the COVID-19 pandemic. Team members from Cotton On Asia Pte Ltd were restructured during COVID-19 pandemic to another company, signalling that the old company was liquidated. Cotton On Singapore the holding company within the South East Asia region of Cotton On Group remains open and trading to customers.

== Brands ==
=== Cotton On ===
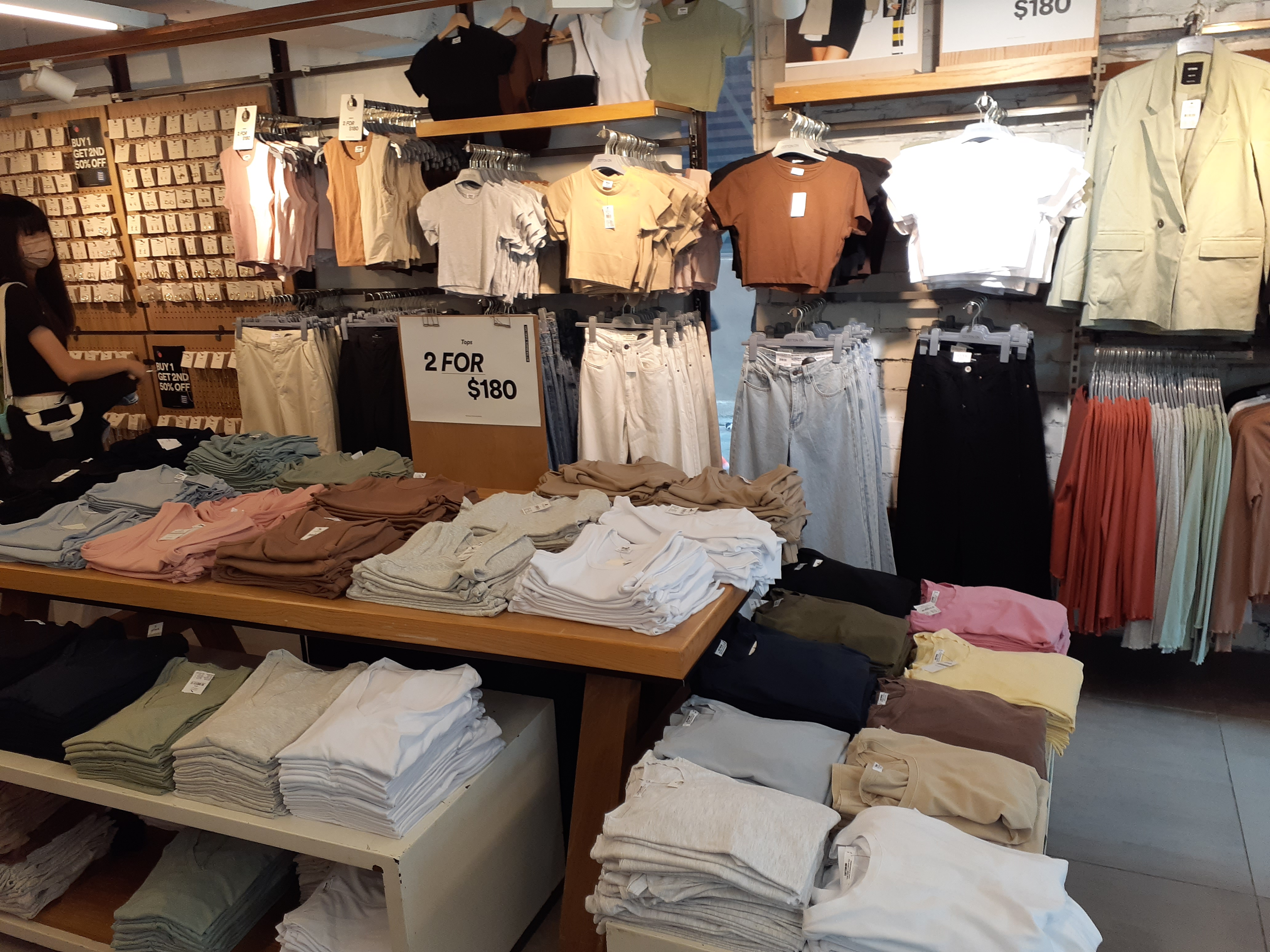
Products on display inside a Cotton On store in Hong Kong

Cotton On is the main brand of the Cotton On Group. It dates its origins back to Nigel Austin's first denim jacket sale in 1988. The first Cotton On branded store opened three years later.

=== Cotton On Kids ===
Cotton On Kids was launched in 2004, selling children's clothing, baby clothing, activewear, dress-ups, fashion accessories, swimwear, gifts, shoes and stationery. In March 2013 it launched a Free by Cotton On range for 9 to 14-year-olds. Free by Cotton On has since been discontinued and was replaced by Cotton On Kids Youth in 2020 which, instead of being an entirely separate range to Cotton On Kids, now offers the same Cotton On Kids items to customers in larger sizes (up to a size 16 in Girls and 20 in Boys).

=== Cotton On Body ===
Cotton On Body was launched in 2007, selling underwear and sleepwear. It later expanded into swimwear and activewear.

=== Factorie ===
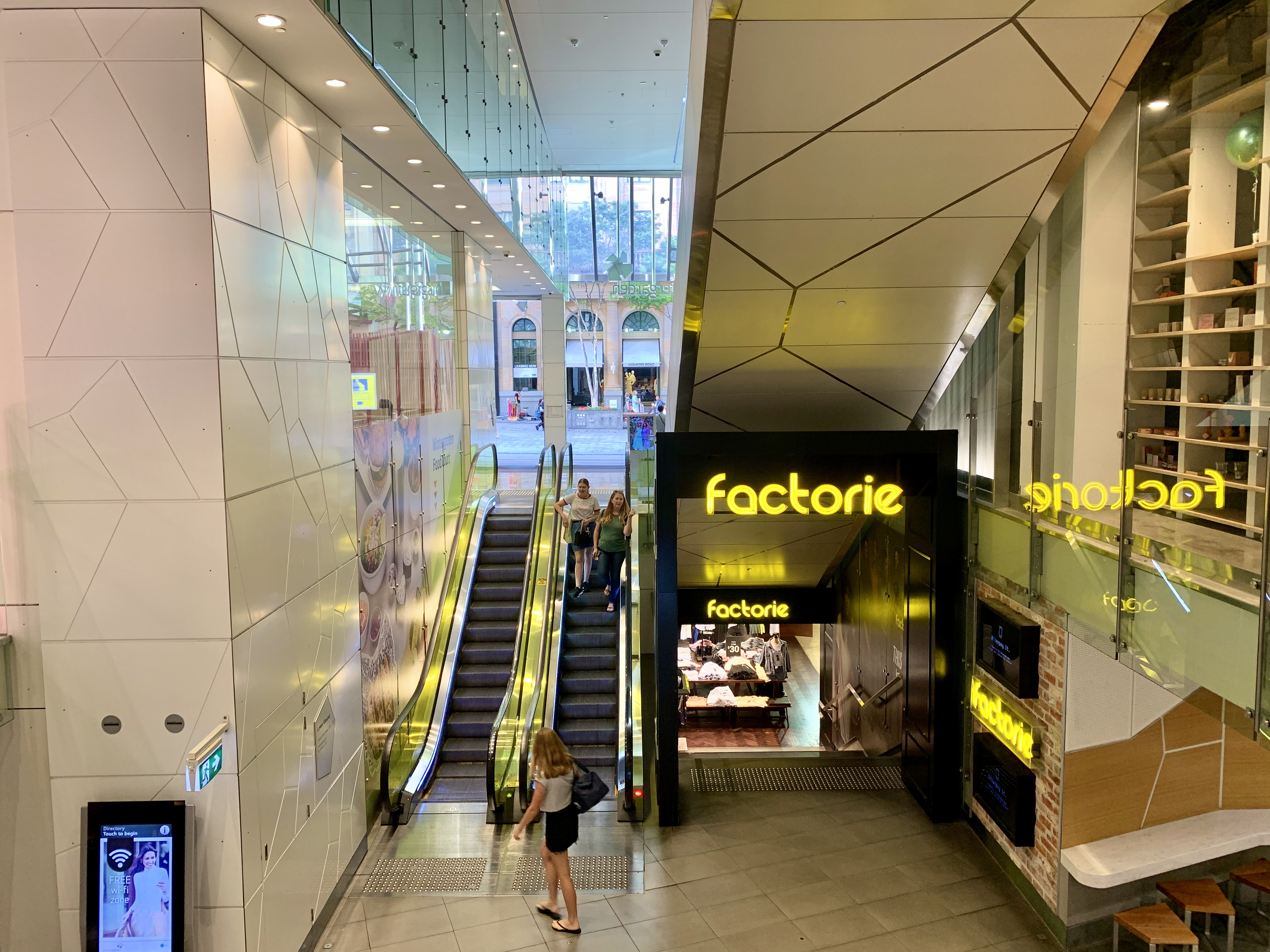
Factorie store in Wintergarden, Brisbane

Factorie is a youth fashion brand which was added to the Cotton On Group in 2007. It has since expanded internationally, and now has more than 160 stores across Australia, New Zealand and South Africa.

=== Rubi ===
Rubi is a footwear and accessories brand launched in 2008.

=== Typo ===
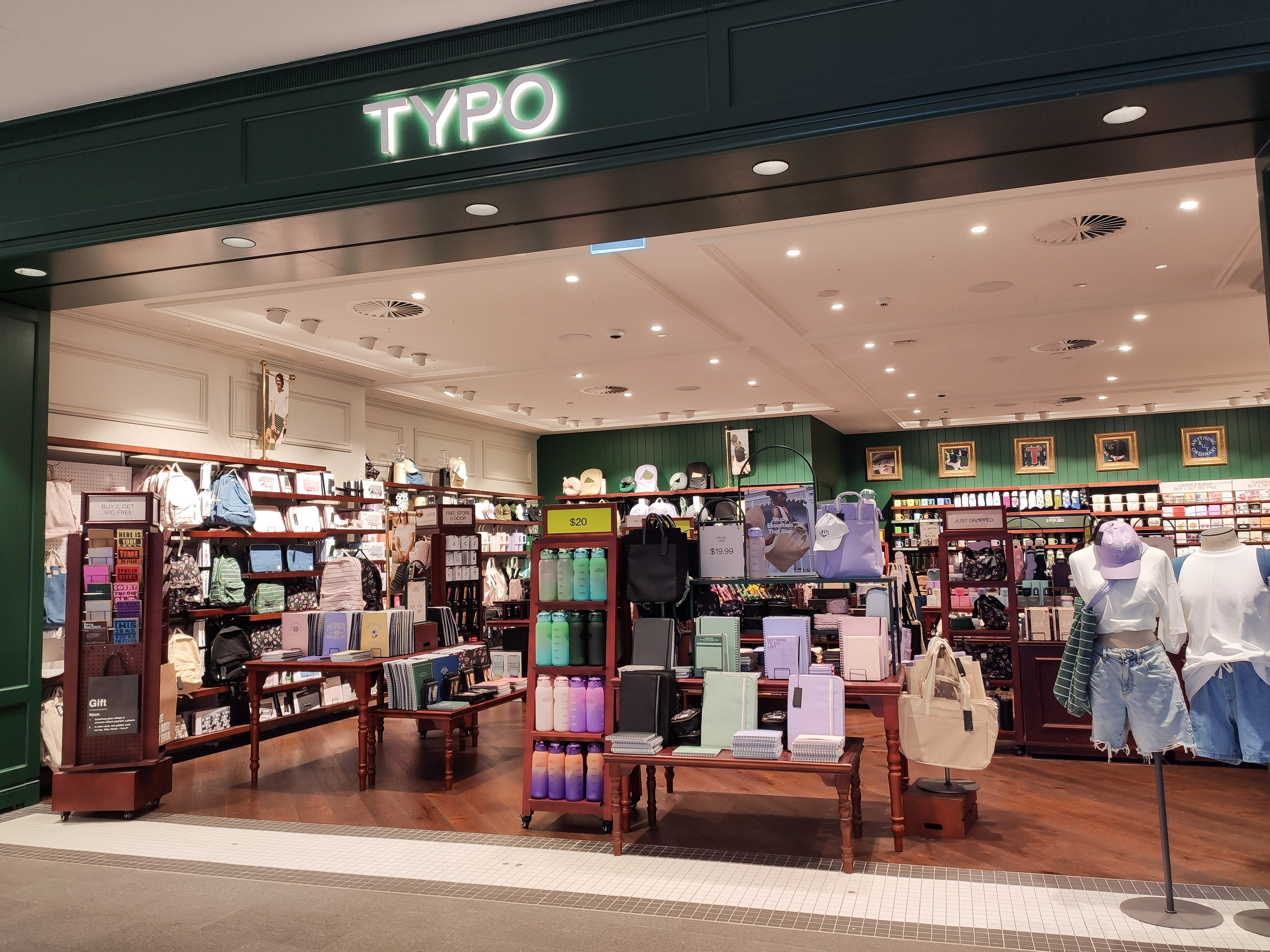
Typo store in Karrinyup Shopping Centre

Typo is a stationery brand with stores in Australia, Asia, New Zealand, the United States, the UK, and South Africa. In the UK, ASOS and WHSmith also stock select Typo products.

=== Supré ===
Supré was established in 1984, selling clothing for young women. It became part of the Cotton On Group in 2013, and had more than 1,000 workers across more than 100 retail stores in Australia and New Zealand at its peak. All Supré stores in NZ had been closed by 2020.

=== Lost ===
Cotton On Lost was launched in late 2018, but has since been phased out. The range included travel luggage and accessories.

=== Ceres Life ===
Ceres Life was launched in April 2020. What started out as an R&D project, it has now cemented itself as Cotton On Group's eighth brand which is aimed at 30yo+ women with a major focus on environment and sustainability, where all items in the range are sourced from responsible fabrics including recycled materials, rescued fabrics and organically grown textiles as well as eco-certified or natural fibres.

== Stores ==
As of January 2025 Cotton On has 1,298 stores globally.

=== Oceania ===
Cotton On has 670 stores in Oceania.

- Australia (574)
- New Zealand (96)

=== Africa and the Middle East ===
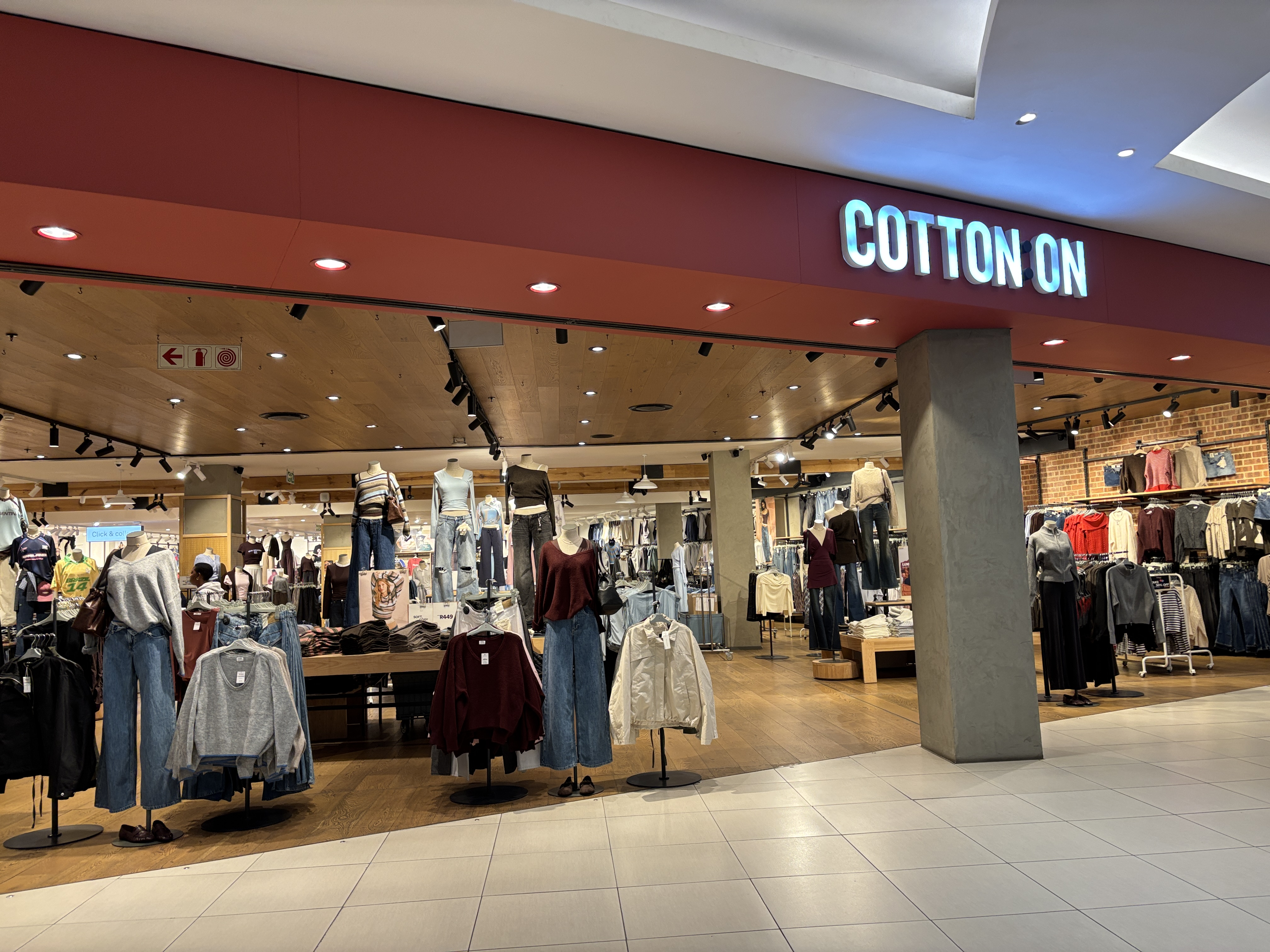
A Cotton On store in Johannesburg

Cotton On has 136 stores in Africa and 29 stores in the Middle East.

- Botswana (3)
- Namibia (4)
- Oman (1)
- South Africa (129)
- United Arab Emirates (28)

=== Americas ===
Cotton On has 210 stores in North America, and 28 stores in South America.

- Brazil (27)
- Canada (1)
- United States (209)
- Venezuela (1)

=== Asia ===
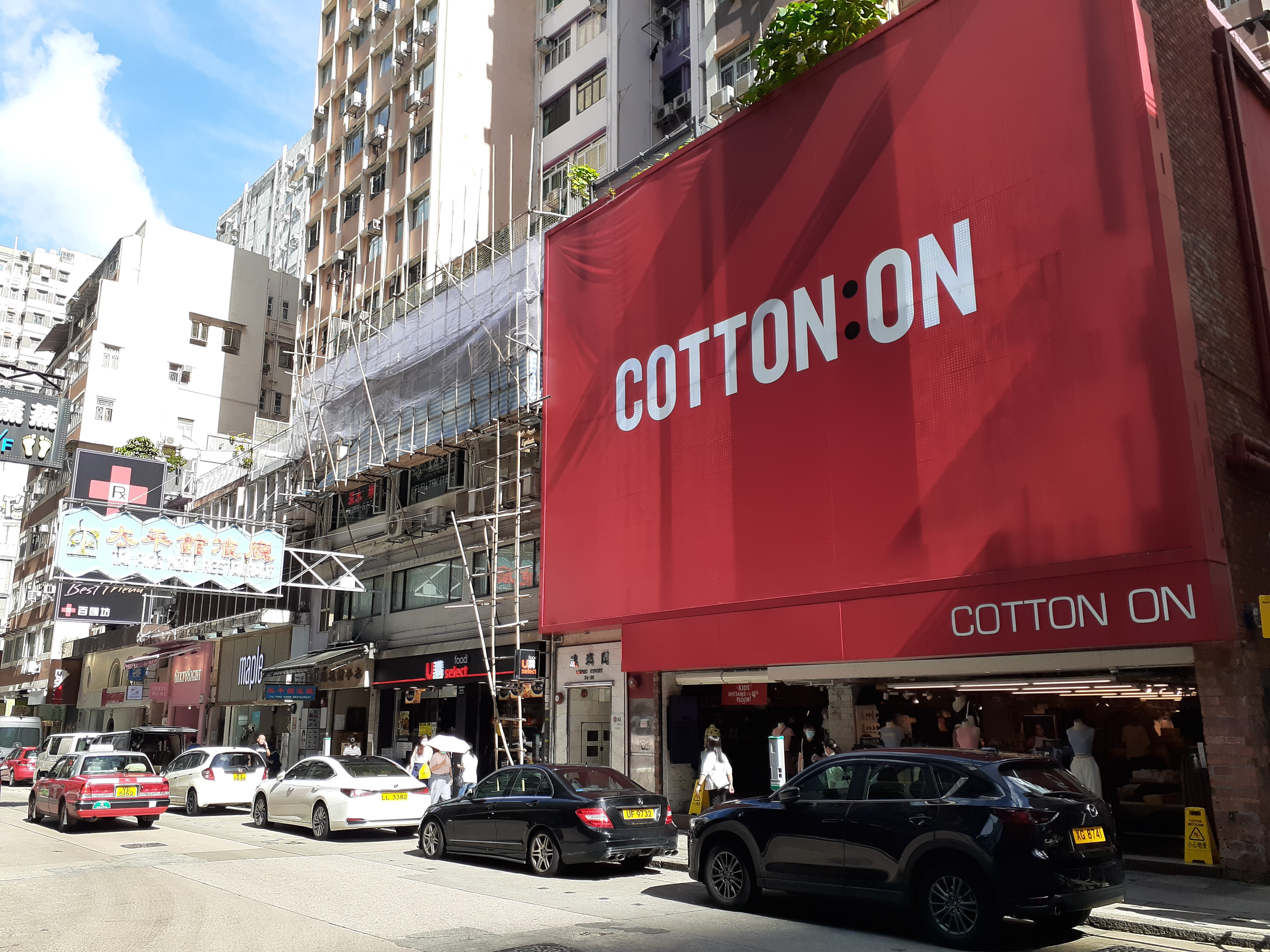
A Cotton On store in Hong Kong

Cotton On has 205 stores in Asia.

- Hong Kong (4)
- Indonesia (36)
- Malaysia (78)
- Philippines (36)
- Singapore (27)
- Vietnam (14)

=== Closed ===
Cotton On previously operated stores in Germany, Jordan, Lebanon, Qatar, Saudi Arabia, and Thailand.

== Loyalty program ==
Cotton On's loyalty program, Cotton On Perks, has over 2.4 million members, making it one of the largest retail loyalty programs in Australia.
