= Lucy Markovic =

Australian fashion model (1998–2025)

- Born: Lucy Markovic; 19 January 1998; Gold Coast, Queensland, Australia
- Died: 10 April 2025 (aged 27); Berlin, Germany
- Occupation: Fashion model
- Years active: 2008–2025

Lucy Markovic (19 January 1998 – 10 April 2025) was an Australian fashion model of Croatian descent. She was best known for her appearance in Australia's Next Top Model in 2015 and for her work with brands such as Givenchy, Versace, Armani and Victoria Beckham. She was signed by the Elite Model Management NYC fashion model management agency. She also appeared in various international editions of Vogue.

== Early life and career ==
Markovic was from Gold Coast, Queensland. In 2015, she appeared on the ninth season of Australia's Next Top Model, where she finished as the runner-up, losing to Brittany Beattie of Whittlesea.

== Personal life and death ==
She had an arteriovenous malformation, a disease that involves tangled, abnormal brain vessels. One month before her death, she learned she needed emergency surgery, which was performed on 2 April 2025 in Berlin.

Markovic died of complications from her disease in Berlin, Germany, on 10 April 2025, at the age of 27. She was in a coma before her death.
