= Sarah-Jane Clarke =

Australian fashion designer

Sarah-Jane Clarke AM
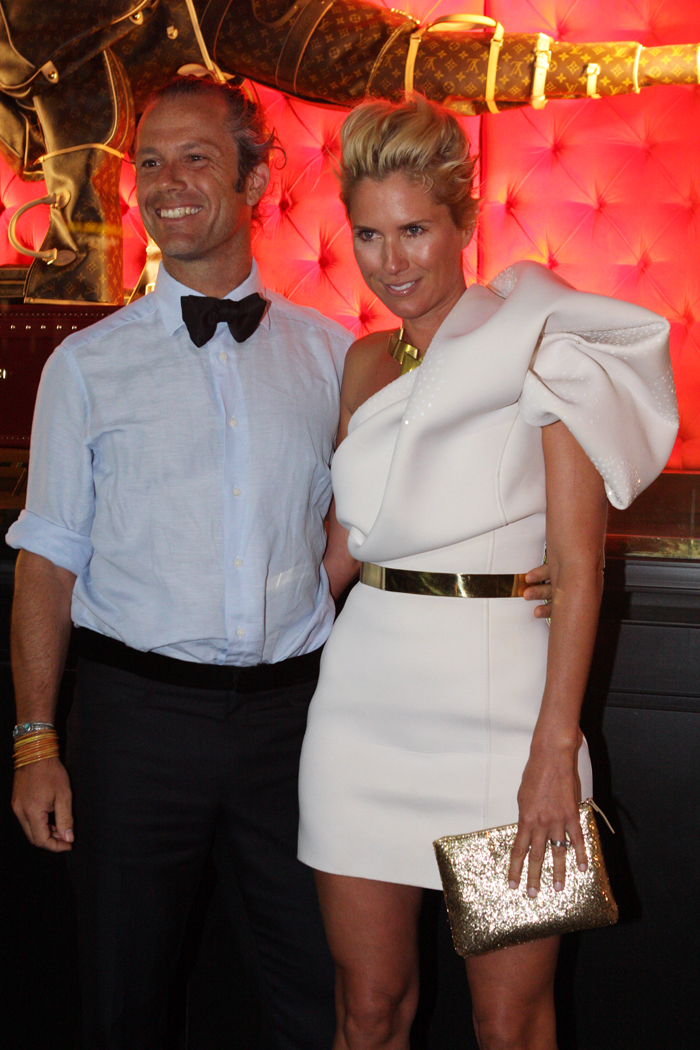
- Sarah-Jane Clarke and husband Daniel Baffski in 2011
- Occupation: Fashion designer
- Years active: 1999–present
- Spouse: Daniel Baffski
- Children: 3
- Website: sarahjaneclarke.com

Sarah-Jane Clarke AM is an Australian designer and one of the founders of Sass & Bide. She went to St Aidan's Anglican Girls School, Brisbane in 1992 and then continued her study at Queensland University of Technology to be an accountant. In 2010, Clarke was awarded Australian winners of the Veuve Clicquot Business Woman Award.

Clarke and Heidi Middleton started their fashion business with a stall of their own designs at 1999 London's Portobello Road Market. Later that year, both of them returned to Sydney and launched their label Sass & Bide which on 2008 was sold across in 30 countries. At the initial phase of their business, Clark and Middleton borrowed $70,000 to start their label in Double Bay. Clarke was mainly in charge of finances and marketing, while Middleton was working on the design. Prior to ready-to-wear product, they mainly produced jeans and denim as their first collection for Sass & Bide.

In 2014, Clarke left Sass & Bide after the company was being sold to one of the biggest Australian retailers, Myer. After four years of hiatus from fashion world, Clarke came back to establish her new label, Sarah-Jane Clarke, in 2018. This new label was dedicated for luxurious travel collection and produced in Australia, with some contribution from artisans around the world.

Clarke was made a Member of the Order of Australia (AM) in the 2019 Queen's Birthday Honours in recognition of her significant service to the fashion industry, and to charitable organisations.

She married an architect, Daniel Baffsky, and has three children.
