= Nathalie Colin =

French jewelry designer

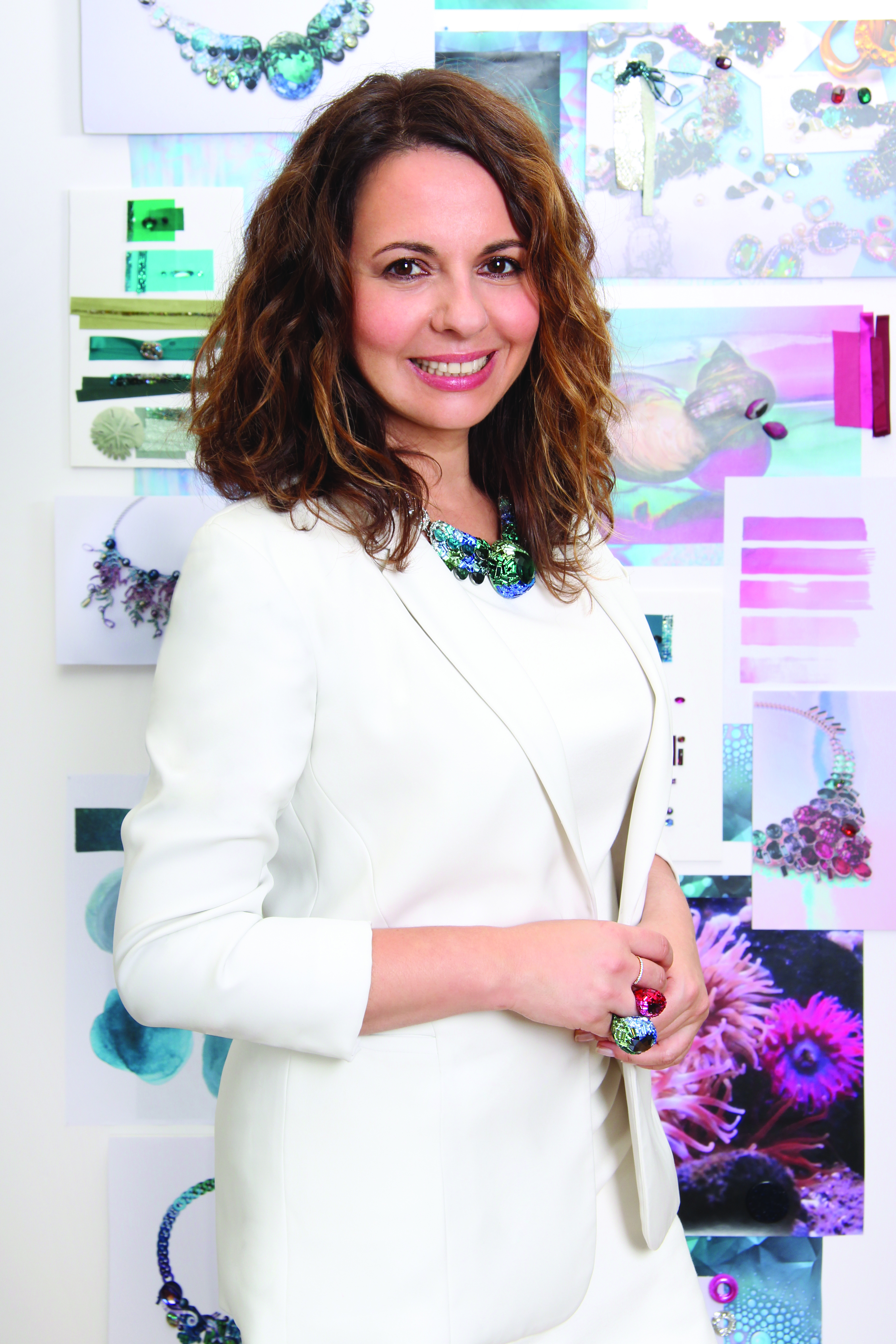
- Born: 17 April 1966 (age 60); Cornimont, France
- Occupation: Jewellery designer
- Years active: 1980s–present
- Known for: Director of Swarovski

Nathalie Colin (born 17 April 1966) is a French jewellery designer and the director of Swarovski.

== Biography ==
Colin was born on 17 April 1966, in the town of Cornimont, France (Vosges, 88).

She graduated from the Institute de Commerce de Nancy. She later worked for Perry Ellis in the merchandising department, with Marc Jacobs as the current director.

In 1990 in Paris, she started to work as a marketing director for Promotion, a trend-forecasting agency. In 1998, Colin founded her own company, Cultural Sushi, a design agency. In 1999/2000, she relocated to Beijing, China to start an apparel brand with Olivier Lapidus for the Chinese company Yimian Group.

== Career ==
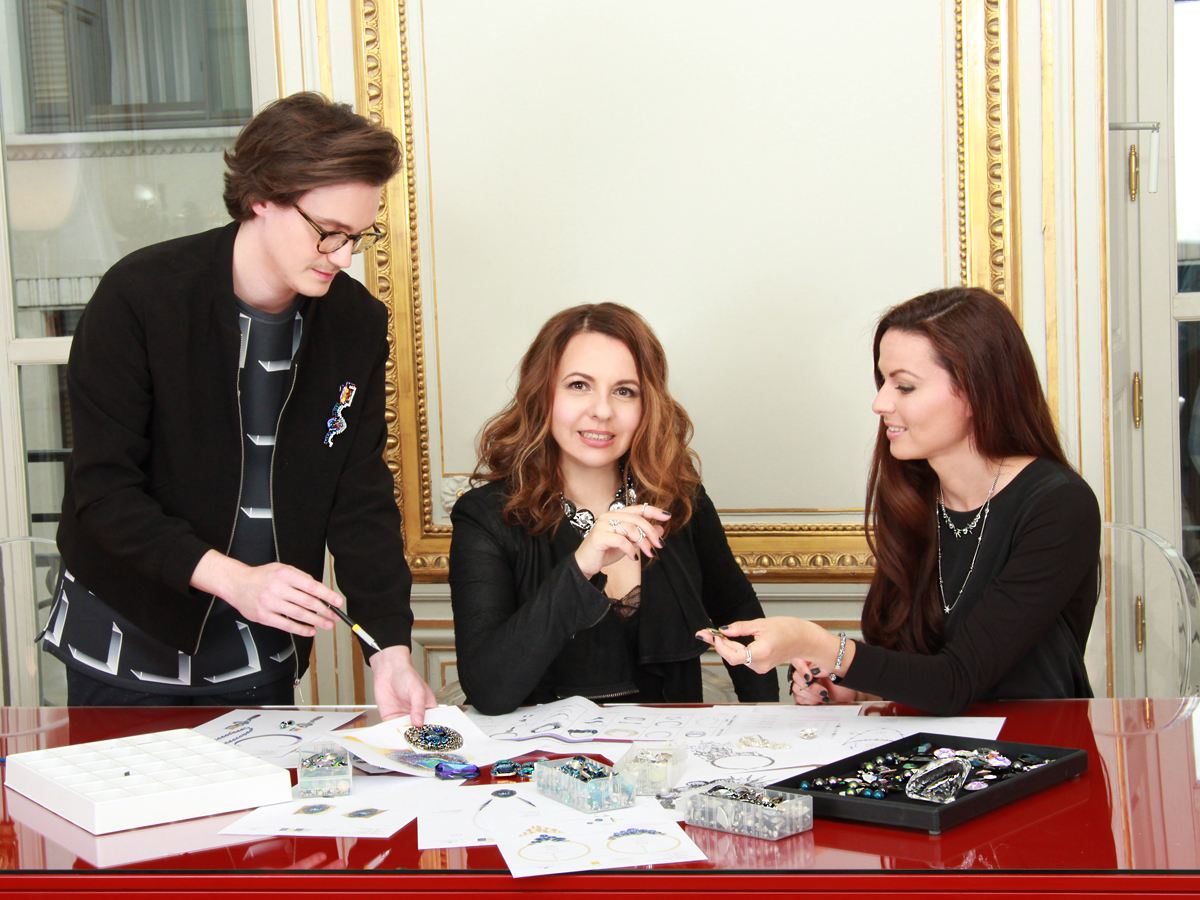
Colin (center) in 2016

She joined Swarovski in 2006 and was given the position of Director of Swarovski.

Her director job was expanded to Executive Vice President Communication from June 2014 to June 2016.

Since 2006, she has been a member of the Management Board for the Consumer Goods Business (CGB) division.

== Publications ==
Nathalie released a book titled, Multifaced(t)s, style yourself with jewelry, in 2012.
