= Alice McCall =

Australian fashion designer

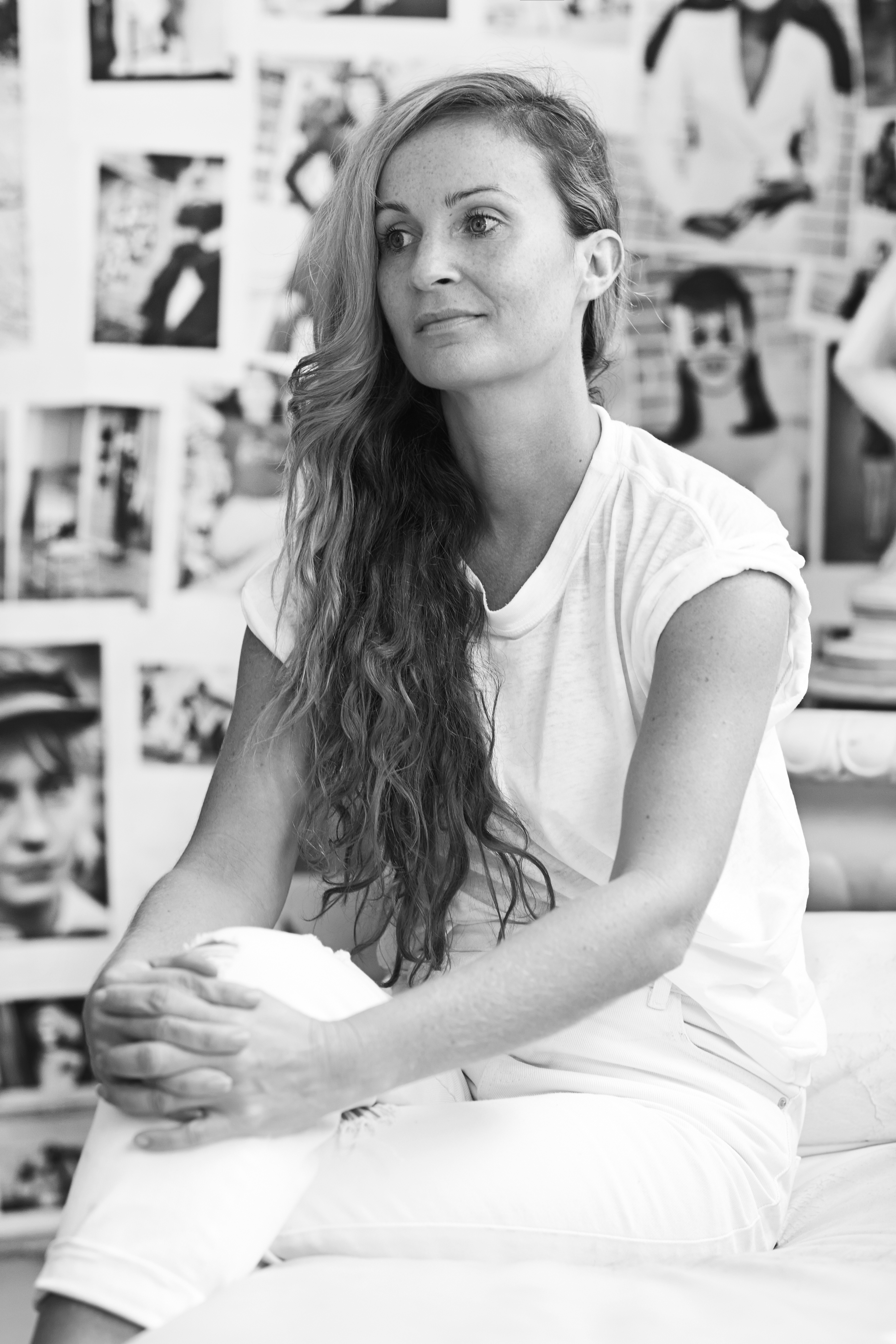
Alice McCall

Alice McCall is an Australian fashion designer. She is the founder of her eponymous fashion label, launched in 2004, that designs women's party dresses, playsuits, and separates. McCall pieces regularly appear in various Australian and international magazines, such as Vogue, Harper's Bazaar, and Elle.

== Career ==
=== Beginnings ===
After moving from Sydney to London, McCall worked for MTV London styling the Stylissimo series and its presenters. She later went freelance as a stylist.

McCall began making one-off luxury silk tops and 1950s style customised dresses which were sold through London boutiques and bought by model Kate Moss and stylist Katie England.

She designed her first collection after being approached by high-end streetwear brand Buddhist Punk to design their 2002 spring/summer women’s collection.

McCall returned to Sydney in 2002, designing for Sass & bide for a couple of years before launching her own label.

=== Fashion label ===
The Alice McCall brand was launched at Australian Fashion Week in 2004. In 2009, the brand began building an online customer base with the introduction of its online e-boutique.

In 2010, Alice McCall opened its first boutique in Sydney's Paddington. In 2016, the brand opened a boutique in the Chinese city of Dalian after McCall made a franchise deal with a local partner. At its peak, the company had 15 stores and as of September 2019, her products were stocked in 171 stores in 36 countries.

McCall has collaborated with various retailers, designing diffusion lines for Target, Topshop and General Pants Co. She has also collaborated with artists Eugina Loli, Alice Babich, and Damon Downey to create standout, unique prints, runway shows, and one off installations.

The company went into voluntary administration in November 2020 due to a decline in revenue caused by the COVID-19 pandemic and the costs of running its physical stores. Despite attempts to restructure its debt and reduce its store footprint, the company went into liquidation in February 2023.

== Personal life ==
Alice McCall's former long-time partner was fashion designer and Buddhist Punk founder Nicholas Morley. McCall and Morley have two daughters.
