= Tobias Sorensen =

Danish male model

- Born: 2 August 1987 (age 38); Copenhagen, Denmark
- Occupation: Model
- Partner: Jasmine Tookes (2012-2016)
- Modeling information
- Height: 6 ft 1 in (1.85 m)
- Hair color: Brown
- Eye color: Brown
- Agency: VNY Models (New York); Elite Model Management (Paris, Milan, Toronto, Barcelona, Amsterdam, Copenhagen) (mother agency); Supa Model Management (London); Dominique Models (Brussels); Modellink (Gothenburg); Modelwerk (Hamburg); MP Management (Stockholm); Kult Australia (Sydney)

Tobias Sorensen is a Danish male model.

== Early life ==
Sorensen was born in Copenhagen. He grew up in Søborg. As a child, he was attacked by a dog, giving him his signature scar on his left cheek.

== Career ==
Sorensen was discovered by an Elite Model Management agent while working at a clothing store. Weeks later he went to Paris Fashion Week to walk in the Kris Van Assche show. He has walked for Dolce & Gabbana, Vivienne Westwood, Giorgio Armani, and Elie Tahari.

Sorensen appeared in an Eternity Now campaign for Calvin Klein with then-girlfriend, American model Jasmine Tookes. He has also been in a Calvin Klein Underwear advertisement with American model Joan Smalls. Other advertisement campaigns include Kenzo, DKNY, Versace, UGG Australia, Belstaff, Hugo Boss, and Buffalo by David Bitton.

Sorensen ranks as on the "Money Guy" and "Sexiest Men" lists on models.com

== Personal life ==
Sorensen was in a relationship with Jasmine Tookes from 2012 to 2016.
