= Supré =

Australian women's wear chain

- Type: Privately owned
- Industry: Fashion Retailer
- Founded: Marrickville, New South Wales, Australia
- Founder: Hans van der Meulen
- Headquarters: Melbourne, Victoria, Australia
- Number of locations: 77 stores (2023)
- Area served: Australia
- Products: Clothing
- Parent: Cotton On Group
- Website: supre.com.au

Supré is an Australian fashion women's wear retalier owned by the Cotton On Group. Known for fashion items and basics at an affordable price point, the Supré product offering is aimed at the youth market. As of September 2023, there are 77 Supré stores in Australia.

== History ==
Supré was founded by retailers Hans and Helen van der Meuleen in Marrickville, New South Wales in 1984.

In 1997, Supré entered voluntary administration.

In 2013, the Cotton On Group acquired Supré with plans to expand the brand internationally. After the acquisition, the Supré head office was relocated from Sydney to the Cotton On Group headquarters in Geelong, Victoria.

In October 2016, Supré opened its first store in South Africa.

In November 2018, Supré was fined by the Queensland Office of Fair Trading (OFT) for misleading customers about the price of clothing at the brand's Chermside store.

All Supré stores in New Zealand had been closed by 2020.

== Products ==
Supré sells fashion denim, tops, printed tees, fragrances, skirts, dresses and accessories.

Supré has mainly sold women's clothing, however has had men's sections at times over the years.
