= Sass & Bide =

Australian women's fashion label

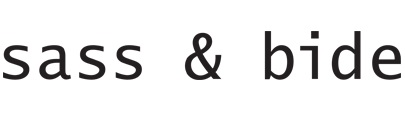

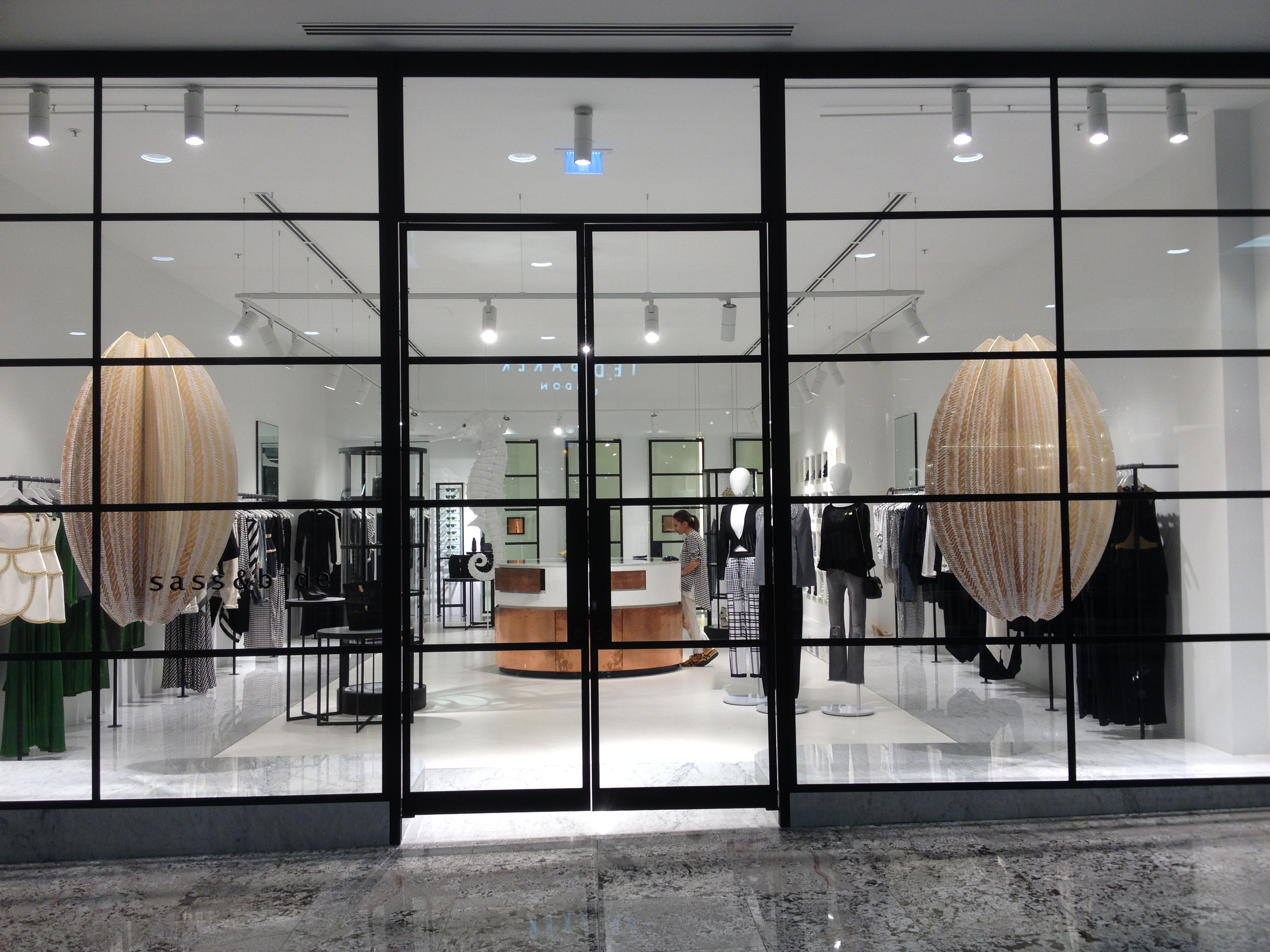
- Sass & Bide store at Indooroopilly Shopping Centre
- Type: Subsidiary
- Founded: 1999
- Headquarters: Sydney, Australia
- Owner: Myer
- Website: sassandbide.com

Sass & Bide (stylised as sass & bide) is an Australian women's fashion label. It was established in 1999 by Sarah-Jane Clarke and Heidi Middleton. In 2003, half of the company was sold to Daniel Besen and David Briskin. Myer acquired a majority stake in the label in 2011 before purchasing the label in its entirety in 2013. Clarke and Middleton left the business in 2014.

The label has been worn by Sarah Jessica Parker, Madonna, Rihanna, Kate Moss, Beyoncé, Paris Hilton, Nicole Richie and Mila Kunis.

== History ==
=== Foundation ===
Sarah-Jane Clarke (Sass) and Heidi Middleton (Bide) first met in 1992, whilst in high school in Brisbane, Queensland. They followed different paths; Clarke studying to be an accountant, while Middleton studied at the Queensland College of Art and Griffith University, prior to becoming an art director. However, they reunited and together went to London in the late 1990s.

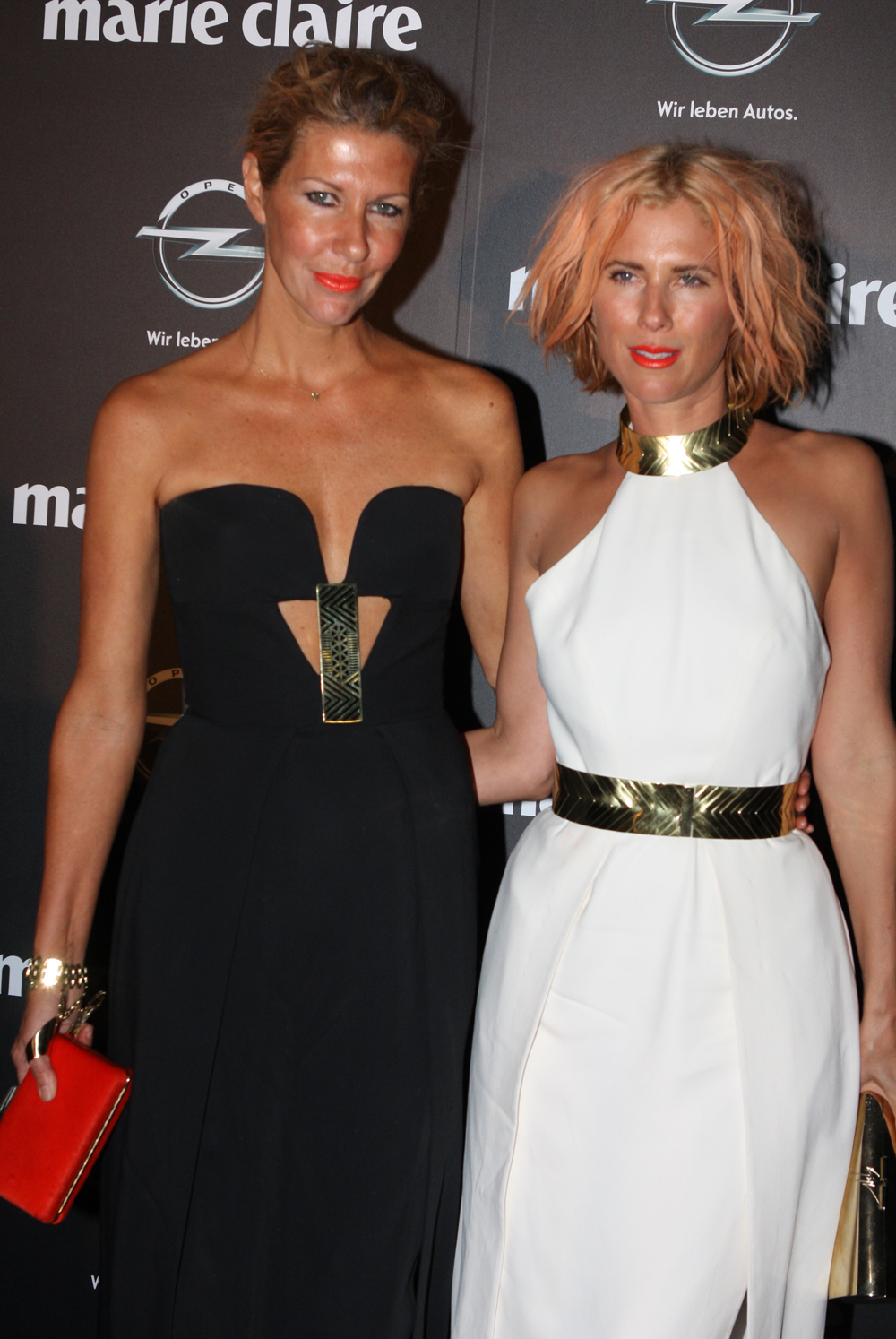
Middleton and Clarke in 2013

The label was founded in 1999 by Clarke and Middleton when they commenced selling customized jeans in a stall on London's Portobello Road Market. Motivated by a love of vintage clothing and markets, Clarke and Middleton claim that they commenced modifying jeans purchased from retail outlets, and cutting to meet their own tastes in fashion.

=== Fashion shows and growth ===
After their initial success in the markets, Clarke and Middleton returned to Australia in 1999, based in Sydney, they developed an underground following that led to their first seasonal collection at Mercedes Australian Fashion Week in 2001. Subsequent collections were shown at London Fashion Week in 2002; New York Fashion Week, commencing in 2003 for eight consecutive seasons, prior to withdrawing in 2009, due to the birth of Clarke's third child. They have shown in London, since 2009. For almost two decades, Sass & Bide has been at the forefront of women's designer fashion.

In a fortunate coincidence in 2002, Clarke and Middleton were in Manhattan where Sarah Jessica Parker was filming a scene for Sex and the City. Clarke was wearing a self-styled denim jacket and took if off and handed it to a security guard, who in turn gave it to Parker. The next day, Clarke and Middleton were invited to Parker's trailer to show their designs. Parker later commissioned Clarke and Middleton to make a few one-off pieces for Sex and the City. Through this publicity, the label propelled growth for the brand in the international marketplace.

=== Sale of business ===
In 2003, Clarke and Middleton sold 50% of Sass & Bide to former owners of the Mimco accessories chain, Daniel Besen and David Briskin, with Briskin taking up the role as chief executive. Clarke and Middleton retained design control of the label.

In early 2011, upmarket Australian department store chain, Myer purchased a 65% stake in the label for A$42.25 million. In October 2013, Myer purchased the remaining 35% of the business for $30 million. Clarke and Middleton retained their executive and advisory board roles until June 2014, when they left the brand altogether.

In September 2024, Myer announced it would close 10 out of the 14 Sass & Bide stores and expand the brand's concession store presence. In January 2026, Myer announced it would close all three Sass & Bide boutiques and all 14 concessions that month. It will be followed by the closure of the Sass & Bide website at the end of February. Myer plans to revitalise the brand and relaunch it later in 2026.

== Wealth ==
First appearing on the BRW Young Rich List in 2006 with a combined wealth assessed at A$30 million, Clarke and Middleton have appeared on every subsequent Young Rich List up to 2009 when their combined wealth was estimated as A$36 million. They did not appear on the list in 2010, yet returned in 2011 with an estimated combined net wealth of A$26 million.
