= Top Ryde City =

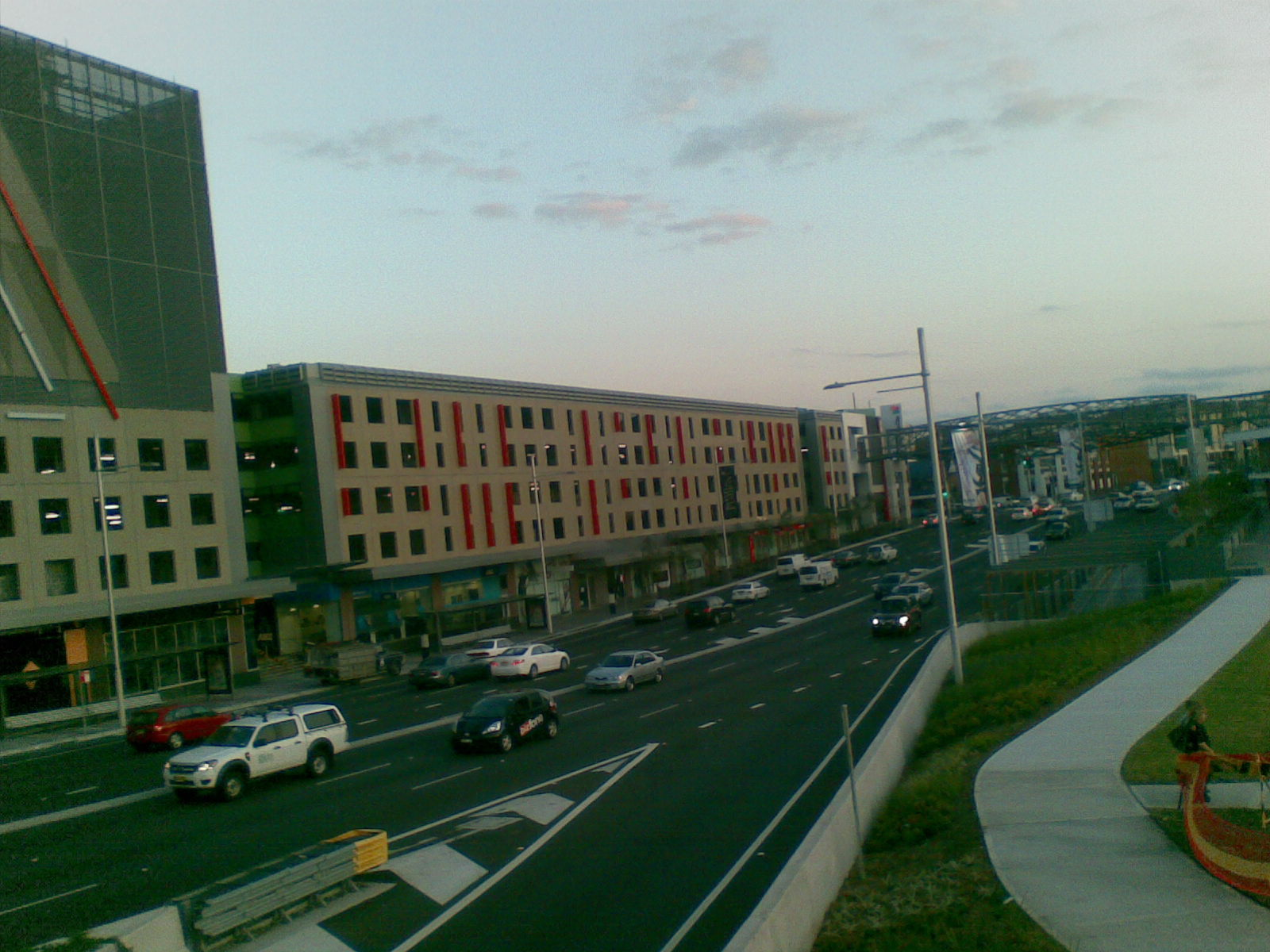
- View of Top Ryde City from Devlin Street
- Location: Ryde, New South Wales, Australia
- Coordinates: 33°48′44″S 151°06′22″E
- Address: Cnr Devlin Street &, Blaxland Road
- Opened: 11 November 1957 (original); 20 August 2010 (current)
- Owner: Blackstone
- Num. of stores: 276
- Floor area: 78,125 m^{2} (840,931 sq ft)
- Floors: 6
- Parking: 6,150
- Website: www.toprydecity.com.au

Top Ryde City, previously known as Top Ryde Shopping Centre, is a large shopping centre in Ryde, a suburb of Sydney, Australia. It is owned by Blackstone.

== History ==
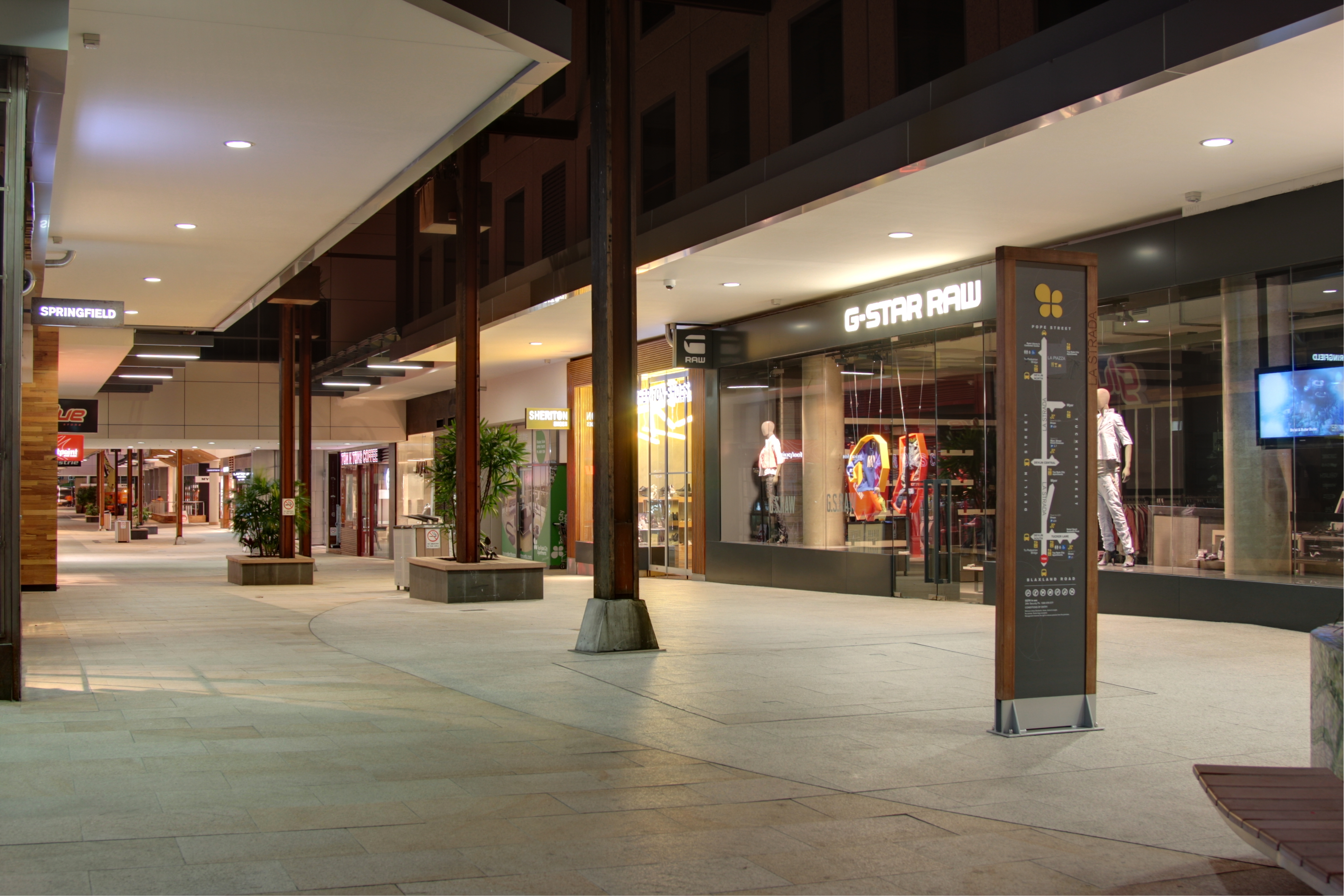
La Strada section of Top Ryde City

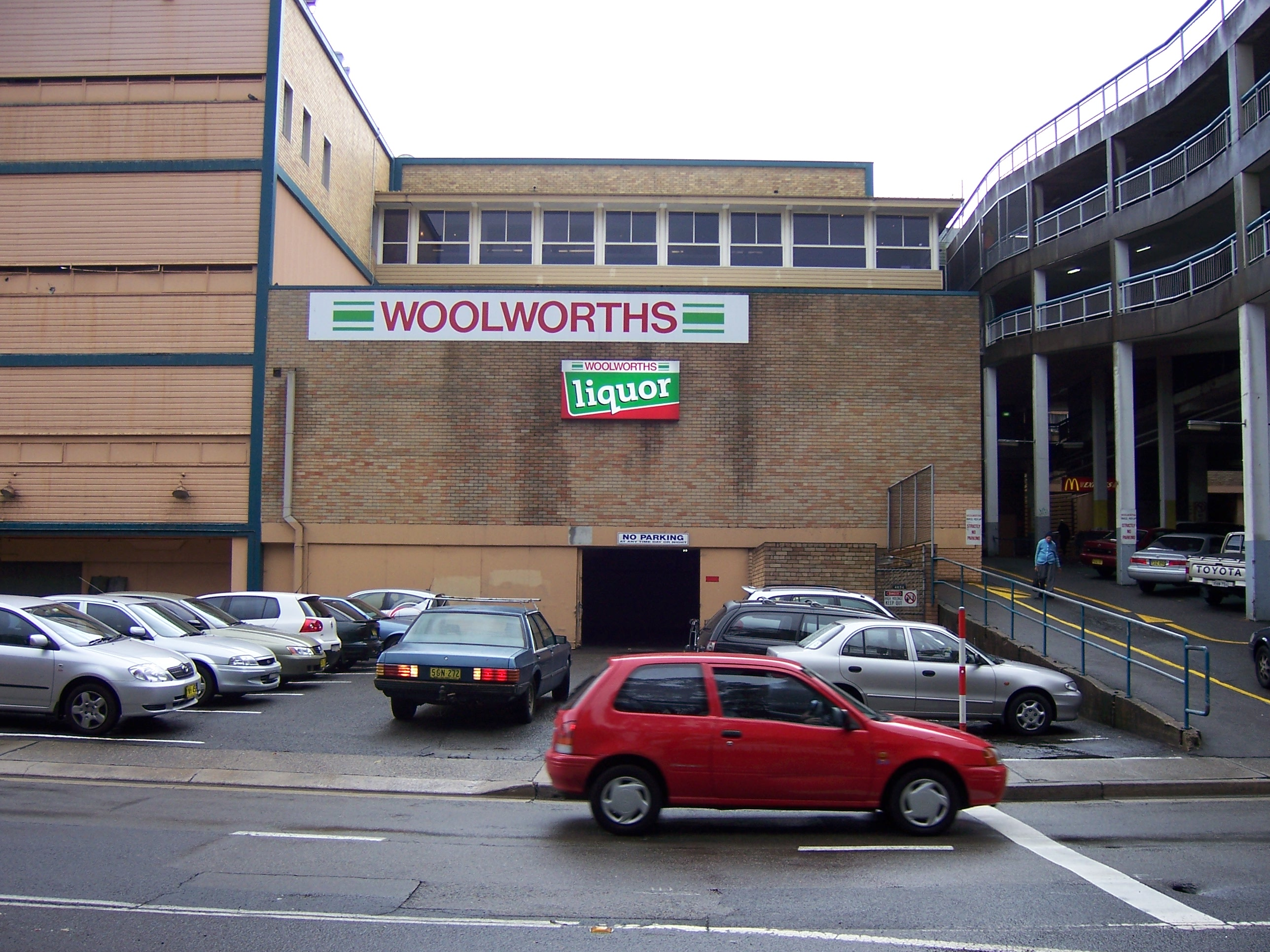
The original Top Ryde Shopping Centre in 2006

=== 20th Century ===
==== 1950s: opening ====
The original Top Ryde Shopping Centre was opened on the current 3.5 hectare site on 14 November 1957 by the Premier of New South Wales Joe Cahill. It was the first post-war major open-air shopping centre built in New South Wales and the second post war and open-air mall-type complex built in Australia after Chermside Drive-In Shopping Centre in Brisbane.

The centre was the dream of Peter Benjamin from the retailing family who opened A.J. Benjamin's in the suburb of Chatswood. Benjamin had travelled to the United States in 1953 where he visited about 20 shopping centres in the new American style and met up with friend Peter Yeoman who was completing postgraduate studies in Detroit on the subject of American shopping centres. Together they devised a design for such a shopping centre in Sydney. Yeoman came up with the idea of the apricot brick and the windowless building with vertical divisions, while Benjamin sketched the layout for retailing.

Top Ryde was anchored by Sydney-based A.J. Benjamin & Co department store, Franklins supermarket, a chain variety store and 45 other shops grouped around a pedestrian mall, with 400 parking spaces. The centre feature modern sculpture centre which was a focal point designed by artist Gordon Andrews, a personal friend of Peter Yeoman. Top Ryde was established with the motto "come as you are...shop in comfort" offering a new experience for the shopper who until this time would have needed to travel to Sydney or Parramatta to gain access to a major department store and such a wide range of variety shopping.

==== 1960s: sale and development ====
In 1962, Top Ryde was sold to Lendlease who undertook expansion of the centre. Woolworths was opened in 1963 in addition to the expansion of the centre which also included a variety store, several speciality shops and another 200 car parking spaces. The A.J. Benjamin store closed and was taken over by Grace Bros in 1964.

==== 1970s ====
As regional shopping centres became the focus of community activities and associated recreational activities a Ten Pin Bowling Alley opened in the 1970s known as BowlAustralia's WondABowl- Top Ryde.

==== 1980s: sale and redevelopment ====
In 1981 the GPT Group acquired ownership of Top Ryde Shopping Centre from Lendlease.

In 1985 Grace Bros closed its store after 21 years of trade.

Top Ryde Shopping Centre underwent $9 million refurbishment in 1986 and changed its name to Top Ryde Shopping Square. A new multi-storey carpark was constructed, new tiling and lighting added, travelators linking the lower concourse and the roofing of the mall area. The lower concourse featured a new food mall with 17 speciality stores. Venture then moved into the space vacated by Grace Bros.

In February 1989 Grosvenor International Australia purchased Top Ryde Shopping Centre for $42.5 million from GPT Group.

==== 1990s ====
Top Ryde Shopping Centre was listed for sale by Grosvenor International Australia with an expectation of $53 million in September 1995.

=== 21st Century ===
==== 2000s: decline and demolition of centre ====
Top Ryde Shopping Centre was listed for sale in early 2000. In October 2000 Bevillesta Group purchased Top Ryde Shopping Centre for $57 million from Grosvenor International Australia after two months of negotiations on the sale. Bevillesta Group intended to develop a major expansion on the centre and add discount department stores, cinemas and potentially a residential tower above the centre.

With the opening of Macquarie Centre in 1981 and the continual growth of nearby centres such as Westfield Hornsby, Westfield Parramatta, Birkenhead Point Outlet Centre and most recently the opening Rhodes Shopping Centre in 2004 had severely affected the retail trade of Top Ryde.

The ageing Top Ryde Shopping Centre had 20,449m² of retail space, a three-level office building and parking for more than 1,000 cars on a site area of 3.2 hectares. Towards the end of the centre's life, it was almost a dead mall featuring Woolworths, Franklins, along with three mini-majors such as BowlAustralia's WondABowl ten-pin bowling centre, Double Bay Clothing Warehouse, Go-Lo Discounts and 84 specialty stores which were predominantly banks and service stores. The centre was situated over 2 floors. The lower level had direct access to the bottom carpark level and featured Woolworths and a small food court. It was connected to the upper level via a travelator. The upper level contained Franklins and access to Blaxland Road and Devlin Street, as well as access to bus services.

A development application was lodged in 2006 by Bevillesta Property Limited to demolish the shopping centre and build a mixed-use development on the site.

In July 2007, the centre was demolished and construction began on $1.2 billion redevelopment of the site. Lend Lease design and Krikis Tayler were the architects for the new shopping centre. Plans for the new centre was to contain a "self-contained village" with shops, community facilities, offices and apartments on a 33,000m² site. The centrepiece of the new centre would be a 200 metre central street known as La Strada which would lead into a 2000m² plaza. An outdoor dining, library, gym, retail and business facilities would be grouped around that plaza.

Bovis Lend Lease was responsible for the project management, design and construction of the new shopping centre after being awarded the $470 million contract in September 2007. Demolition works on the old centre were completed in February 2008 with construction works on the new centre commenced in April 2008. The first concrete slab was poured in July 2008.

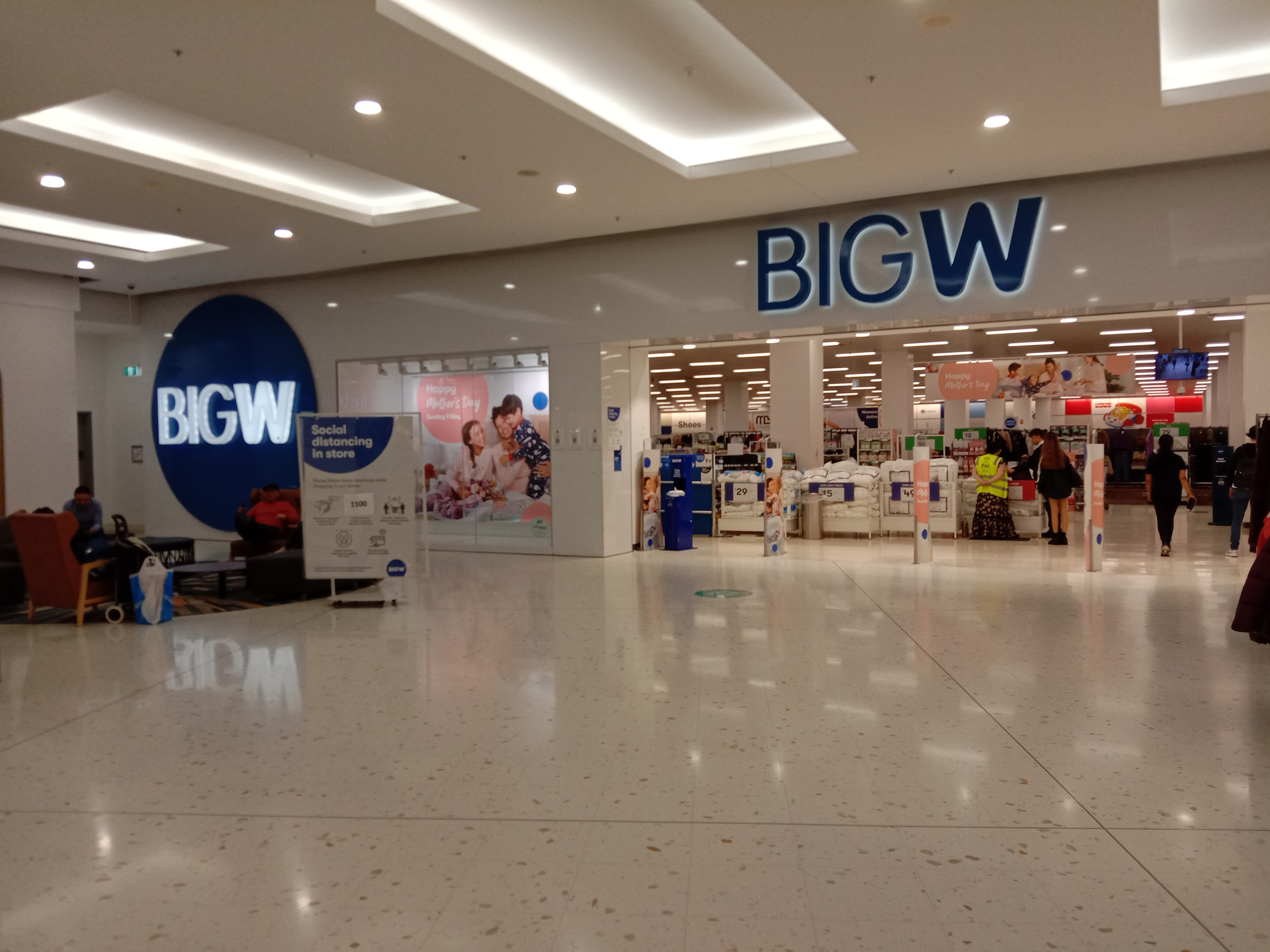
Big W store in Top Ryde City

Stage one of the redevelopment opened on 5 November 2009 with the opening of 120 stores below ground on lower ground levels 1 and 2 on the Tucker Street side of the development. The lower ground 1 level included the opening of Big W, Dick Smith, JB Hi-Fi, 14 specialty stores and 17 food outlets in the food court. Woolworths, Dan Murphy's, Golden Banana and 10 specialty stores opened on the lower ground level 2.

==== 2010s: redevelopment ====
The corner of Devlin and Pope Street side of the development was completed in early 2010 with the ground level area completed and paving underway and the formation of levels 3 and 4.

Stage two of the redevelopment opened on 20 February 2010 with the opening of five specialty stores on lower ground level 1 and the opening of Aldi, Franklins and around 10 specialty stores on the lower ground level 2. On 16 March 2010, the ground level and the first section of La Strada (fashion precinct) were completed and included the opening of Rebel Sport, Australia Post and around 13 specialty stores.

Stage three of the redevelopment opened on 4 August 2010 with the opening of an additional 150 specialty stores and two more levels of retail which included the two level Myer department store on the ground level and level 1, Freedom Furniture on level 1, the completion of the La Strada fashion precinct and the opening of the first four restaurants in La Piazza.

Top Ryde City had its official opening on 20 August 2010 which was presided over by Prime Minister Julia Gillard.

On 16 December 2010, the eight screen Event Cinemas complex which features a 25 metre VMAX screen opened on level 1 just in time for the Tron Legacy film.

The final works which included a childcare centre, medical centre, Gymnasium, The new Ryde Library and The Ryde Planning and Business Centre all opened in February 2011. There were plans for Strike Bowling to open February 2011, but the plans were cancelled and the bowling alley never opened.

The southern pedestrian overpass opened in December 2009 and the northern pedestrian overpass was opened in August 2010.

The development of the project encountered a number of problems, including issues of worker safety in the surrounding roads and a near fatal workplace accident. In addition to this, the local Chamber of Commerce raised some concerns with the project managers about the movement of trucks near the site, although these seem to have been dealt with by the project managers with the termination of contracts with trucking companies.

The original owners of Top Ryde City entered administration in 2011 with McGrathNicol appointed administrator. Top Ryde was sold to Blackstone in November 2012.

A development application was lodged in November 2013 to convert three retail tenancies on level 1 to restaurants and construction of outdoor balcony and awning facing the La Piazza, the addition of a new entrance to the centre from La Strada and the addition of a travelator across La Strada linking level 1A mezzanine car park with level 1 of the centre. On lower ground 2, a development application was lodged to reconfigure the layout the southwestern end of that level to accommodate a 5,104m² major tenant. The reconfiguration would involve the replacement of the Supa IGA, Pharmacy 4 Less, The Reject Shop and three smaller tenancies. The shopfront of the major tenant would extend into the mall area and involve the removal of several kiosks.

In 2014 property developer Crown Group Holdings completed the final apartments in its 653-apartment development, Top Ryde City Living. The seven-tower residential complex is home to more than 600 residents and positioned above Top Ryde City Shopping Centre with views to the Sydney Harbour Bridge, Blue Mountains and North Shore.

The development was awarded the NSW President's award in 2014 by the Urban Development Institute of Australia.

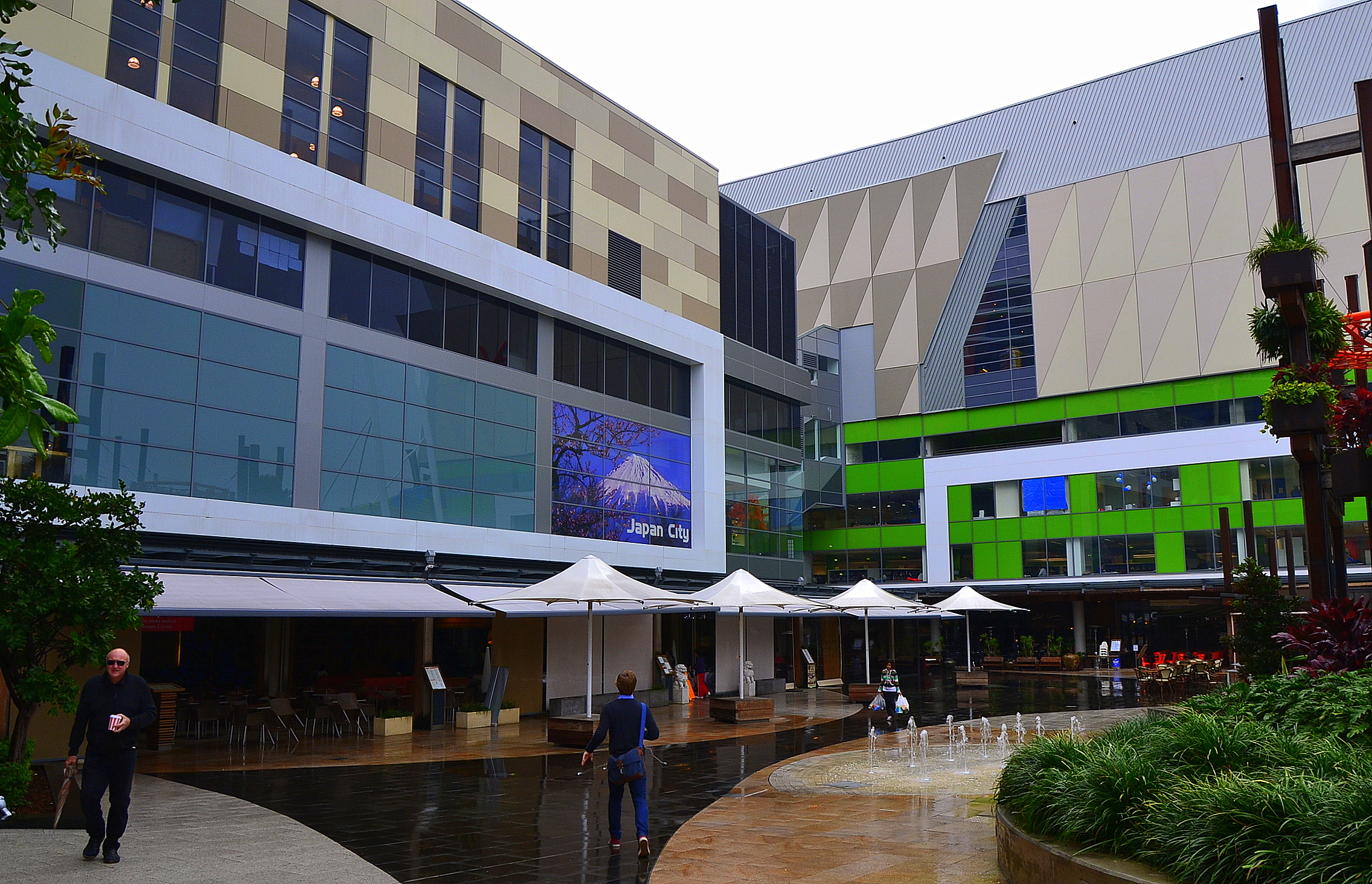
La Piazza section of Top Ryde City

On 5 May 2015, Myer announced that it will close its store in Top Ryde City after four years due to poor sales with many customers increasingly shopping at other Myer stores such as Parramatta, Chatswood, Macquarie Centre and Sydney. Myer closed its store in late July 2015 and as part of the $40 million redevelopment of the centre, the space was to be handed over to Coles and a mini-major such as H&M, Zara or Uniqlo.

Predevelopment work began in mid 2015 with the relocation and closure of stores on the lower ground level 2 around the former Supa IGA supermarket and the closure and relocation of stores including Freedom Furniture on the former Myer level 1 and ground level. Works for both Kmart and Coles commenced in October 2015.

On 16 June 2016, a full line Kmart discount department store opened on lower ground level 2. The 5,500m² store occupied the former Supa IGA and 12 specialty stores. At the same time Woolworths opened its refurbished store with great fanfare by giving away $25 gift vouchers and 'goodie' bags to the first 200 customers.

On 9 November 2016, the official opening on level 1 occurred with the opening of a full line Coles supermarket and adjoining Liquorland store on the former Myer level 1 and Freedom Furniture space, a new fresh food precinct, Rashays casual dining restaurant, The Reject Shop and around 25 new specialty stores.

The final works of the $40 million development concluded on 22 July 2017 with the opening of Harris Scarfe which opened its first full line Sydney store on the of the former Myer ground floor space.

On 17 August 2017, TK Maxx opened its store on the ground level next to Harris Scarfe.

In December 2019, Harris Scarfe entered voluntary administration . The store at Top Ryde City had permanently closed amongst the 20 other stores in February 2020. This store was temporarily replaced by Supreme Furniture which opened on 1 August 2020 and closed at the end of 2020.

==== 2020s ====
On 5 November 2021, The Entertainment and Education Group (TEEG) opened its first dual-branded Timezone and Zone Bowling opened on the former space of Harris Scarfe. The 3000m² venue features 140 arcade games, 12 bowling lanes, a laser tag arena accommodating up to 24 players, a seven-car Spin Zone Bumper Car arena, a Winners Vault prize selection area and three multi-purpose party rooms accommodating up to 90 people to celebrate birthdays or corporate gatherings.

== Tenants ==
Top Ryde City has 78,125m² of floor space. The major retailers include Big W, Kmart, Aldi, Coles, Woolworths, TK Maxx, JB Hi-Fi, Rebel, Fitness First, Timezone & Zone Bowling and Event Cinemas.

== Transport ==
Top Ryde has bus connections to the Sydney CBD, North Shore and Northern Suburbs, as well as local surrounding suburbs operated by Busways. The majority of bus services depart from Devlin Road in front of the shopping centre's main entrance and Blaxland Road. There is no railway station at Ryde, the nearest stations are located at Meadowbank and West Ryde.
