= Westpoint Blacktown =

Westpoint

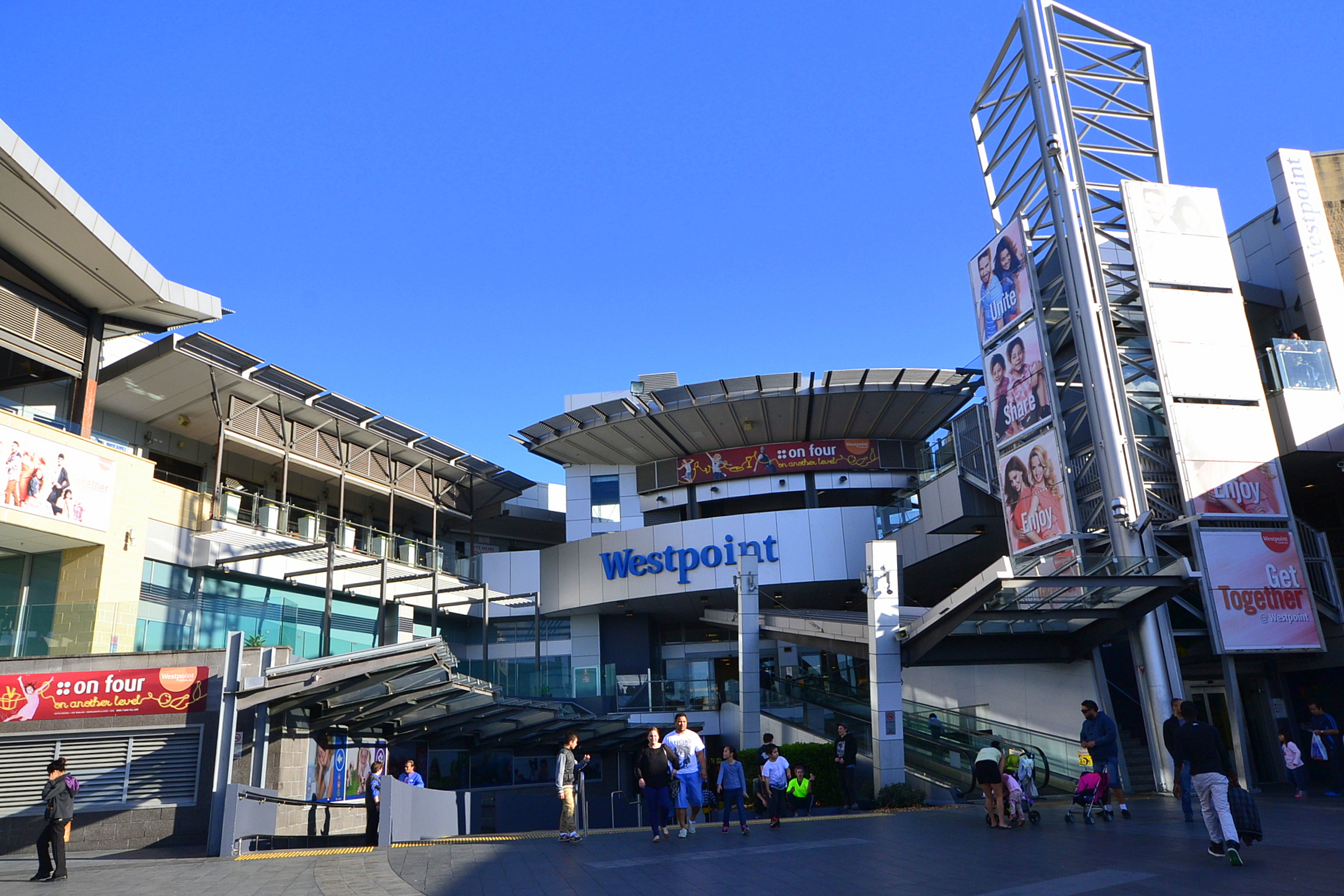
- Front of Westpoint Blacktown
- Location: Blacktown, New South Wales, Australia
- Opened: 1973; 53 years ago
- Developer: W McNamara Pty Ltd
- Manager: Haben
- Owner: Haben and Hines
- Num. of stores: 262
- Num. of anchor tenants: 7
- Floor area: 110,000 square metres (11 ha)
- Floors: 4 (6 levels in car park)
- Public transit: Blacktown
- Website: www.westpoint.com.au

Westpoint Blacktown is a large suburban shopping centre situated in Blacktown, Western Sydney, New South Wales. It was first opened in 1973, and then renovated and expanded in 2006, making it one of the biggest shopping centres in Western Sydney.

== History ==
Westpoint Blacktown was built by the Parramatta-based developer W McNamara Pty Ltd, and opened in April 1973 anchored by Farmers (later renamed Grace Bros) Grace Bros and Waltons. It was built on formerly residential land slightly west of Blacktown's previous shopping district along Main Street, which declined due to the new competition from Westpoint.

=== Expansion ===
A significant eastern expansion of Westpoint commenced in May 2003 and was completed in April 2006. As part of these works, one block of Patrick Street and the former Patrick Mall were closed and built over, and Max Webber library was closed and rebuilt at a new location.

The expansion was commissioned by the then-owner of Westpoint, Queensland Investment Corporation (QIC), who contracted Baulderstone Hornibrook Pty Ltd (BHPL) to undertake the works. However BHPL and QIC became embroiled in legal proceedings regarding the payment of outstanding progress payments which BHPL claimed were owing to it. This court proceeding delayed construction. In October 2006, QIC terminated the contract with BHPL.

=== Myer closure ===
In February 2022, Myer announced its plan to close its department store in Westpoint Blacktown on 3 April of the same year. The company stated the move as a desire to follow its 'Customer First Plan', to downsize and shift more sales online. Myer cited as an example, the decision to close Myer Knox, in Melbourne's east in July 2021. At the time of its closure, Myer was the single largest tenant in Westpoint, occupying multiple floors. Its former floorspace was renovated and replaced with multiple smaller stores.

=== Sale ===
In 2024, it was reported that QIC would sell Westpoint for A$900 million to Australian fund manager Haben and United States real estate investor Hines. At the time, it was the largest single property asset in Australia to be traded, and it beat the record for largest single retail asset transaction in Australia previously set by the sale of Indooroopilly Shopping Centre in 2017.

On 23 January 2025, the Hines-Haben partnership completed the acquisition of Westpoint.

== Stores and features ==
The centre incorporates several key retail outlets: including department stores Big W, Kmart (which is located outside of the centre) and Target as well as supermarket chains Woolworths, Coles and Aldi (replaced Franklins). The refurbishment incorporated an entertainment precinct, which incorporates a Hoyts 10 screen cinema, Zone Bowling alley which also incorporates a Timezone video arcade. Level 4 is primarily made of restaurants and dining options. Major brands which have store here include: JB Hi-Fi, Foot Locker, JD Sports, Cotton On, Adidas Originals, Rebel, TK Maxx, etc. In December 2019 Taco Bell opened in Westpoint Blacktown.

== Access ==
=== Car park ===
Westpoint includes a large multi-level car park along its southern side. In 2018, half of the car park was temporarily closed due to issues with structural integrity. Repair work commenced in early 2019 was completed in October 2019 in time for the 2019 Christmas period.

=== Public transport and taxis ===
Within Westpoint is an underground bus interchange serviced by several cross-city, local and school bus routes. This interchange was opened in 2006, beneath the section of Patrick Street which Westpoint expanded over. Blacktown railway station is within short walking distance of the main entrance to Westpoint on level three, and is serviced by T1, T5 and Blue Mountains Line services. There is one taxi rank located between Westpoint and the railway station, and another on level four.

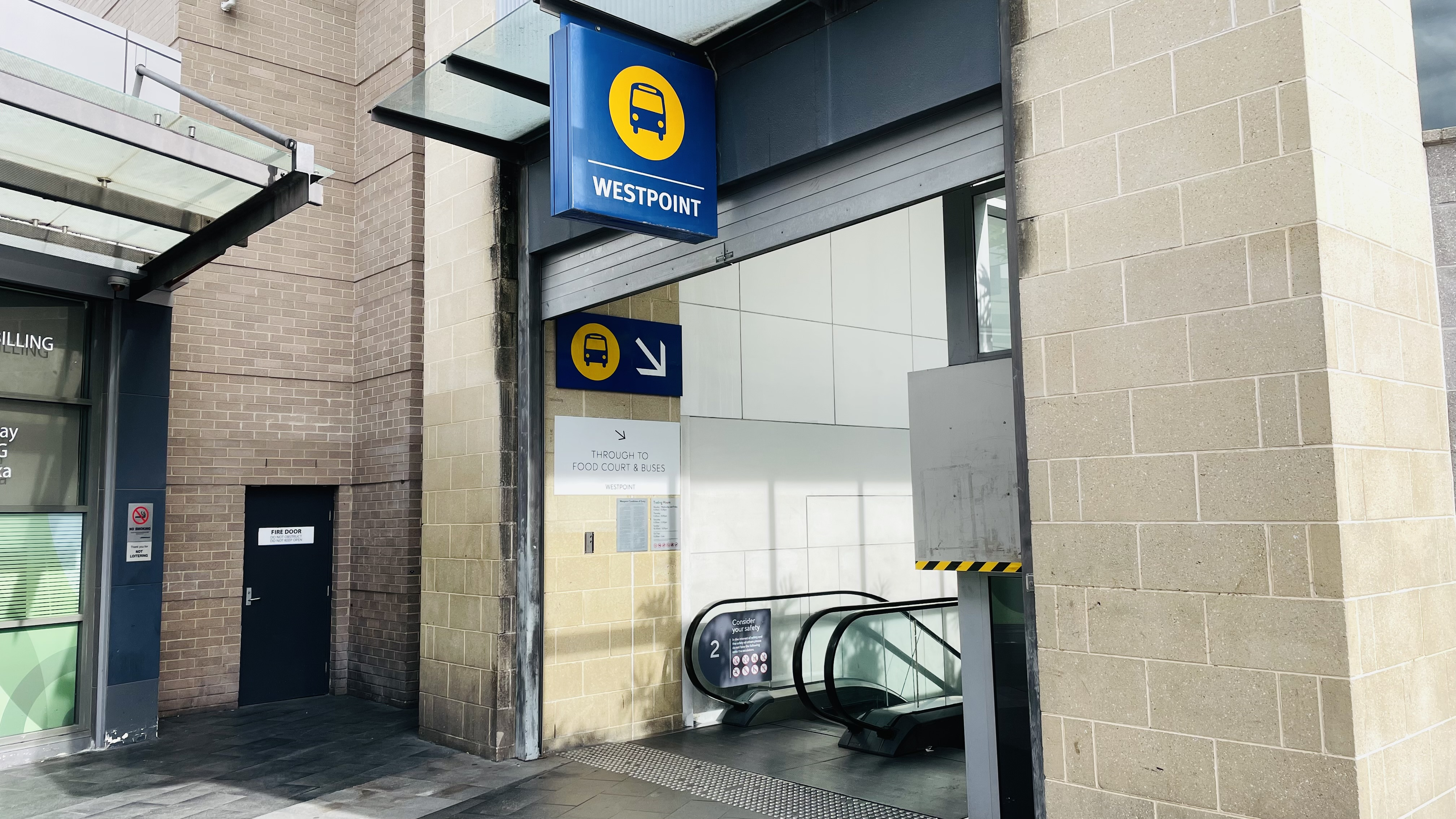
Entrance to the bus terminal

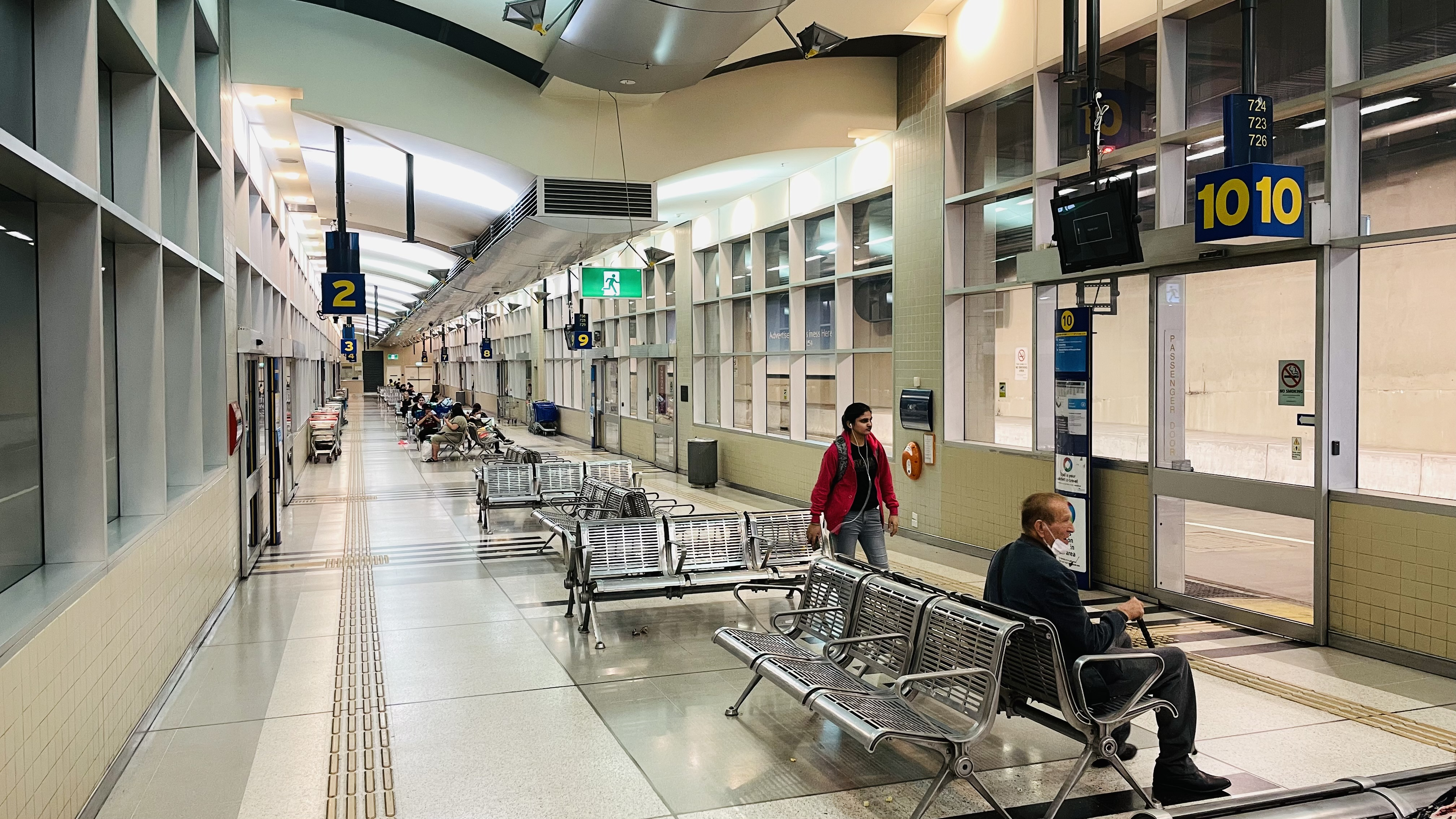
Bus terminal waiting area

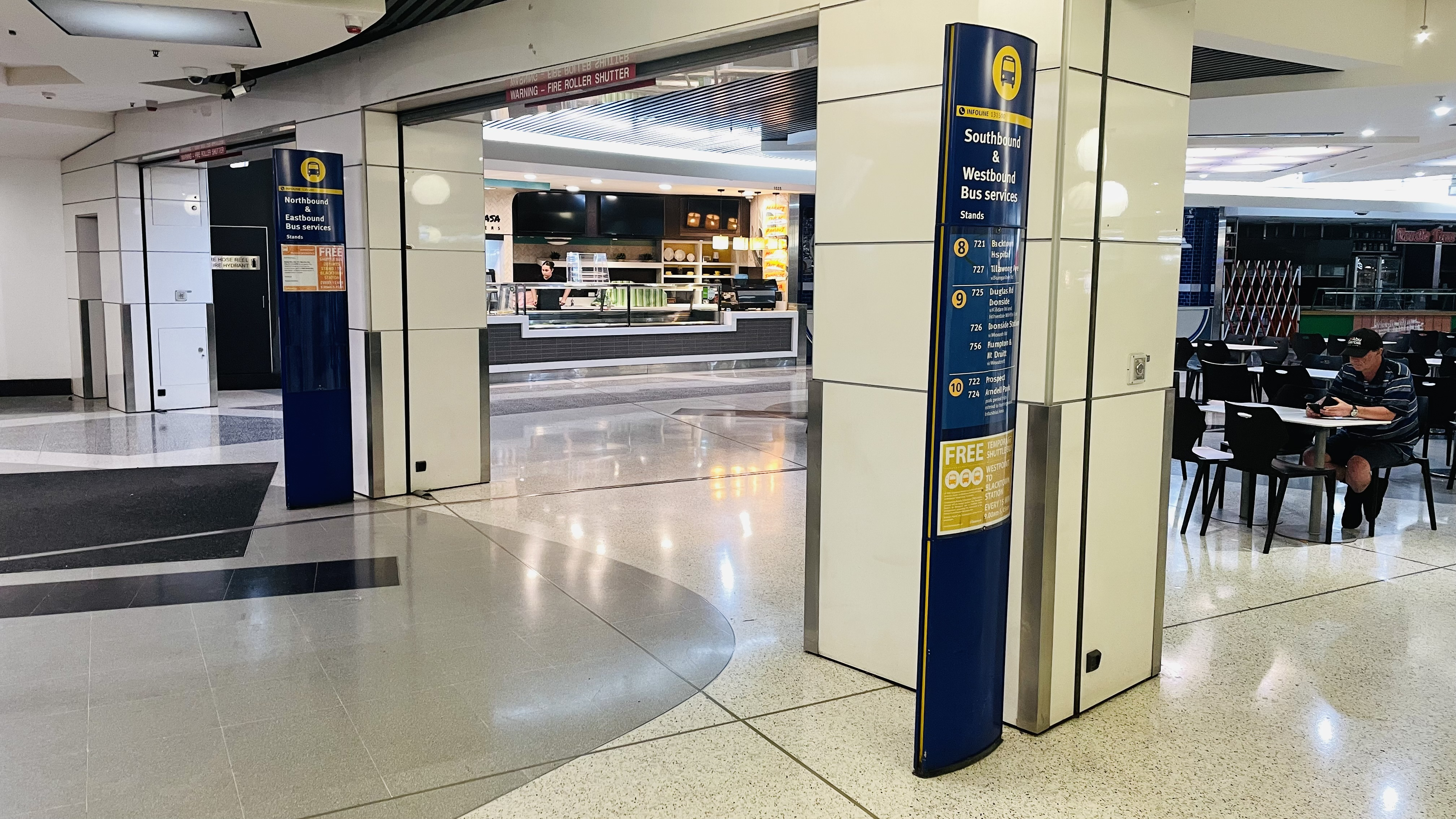
Signage leading to bus terminal
