= Crown Group Holdings =

Australian property group

- Industry: Property, Hotel, Investment
- Founded: 1994
- Headquarters: Sydney, New South Wales, Australia
- Key people: Paul Sathio, Chief Executive; Iwan Sunito, Chief Executive
- Website: www.crowngroup.com.au

Crown Group Holdings is a property group that deals with the development and investment of properties in Australia. It was co-founded in 1996 by Paul Sathio and Iwan Sunito. The group is headquartered at Sydney, Australia and has branches in Indonesia.

The company was awarded NSW President's award and Best Concept Design by the Urban Development Institute of Australia.

The company had about a 4000-unit pipeline of Sydney projects.

== History ==
The company was co-founded by engineer Paul Sathio and architect Iwan Sunito in 1996.

In 1994 Iwan Sunito established his own architecture firm, Joshua International Architects which was in 1996 amalgamated with two business partners, including current Chief Executive Officer Paul Sathio, to form Crown Group.

In August 2023, a provisional liquidator was appointed on just and equitable grounds to sell the assets of Crown Group and distribute surplus cash to the shareholders.

In March 2025, CII Group Pty Ltd, the shareholder vehicle of Iwan Sunito was placed in full liquidation, removing his interest in Crown Group.

== Properties ==
Crown Group has completed residential developments in locations across Sydney including Green Square, Waterloo, Sydney, North Sydney, Ryde, Bondi, Bondi Junction, Parramatta, Ashfield, Epping, Homebush, Newington, Pennant Hills and Rhodes.

The group's first development in 1996 ‘The Crown’ at Bondi Junction was a 54-unit development at Bondi Junction.

Crown Group has recently completed projects in Sydney: V by Crown Group, more than 500 units building complex, a 29-storey residential tower in Parramatta; Arc by Crown Group, a 25-storey tower in Sydney CBD on Clarence Street; Skye by Crown Group, a 20-storey development in North Sydney and 400 apartments and retail in Eastlakes.

In 2019, they completed two developments. The first was Infinity by Crown Group, designed by Koichi Takada Architects, which is part of the urban renewal in the Green Square town centre in Sydney and has become an architectural icon in Sydney since its completion. By 2030, City of Sydney expects Green Square to attract 40,000 new residents and 22,000 new workers.

The SJB-designed development Waterfall by Crown Group in nearby Waterloo was also finished in late 2019.

== Hotels ==
Crown Group's boutique hotel chain, SKYE Suites, currently has two hotels in operation; SKYE Suites Parramatta and SKYE Suites Sydney CBD.
