= Timezone (video arcades) =

Australian entertainment company

- Logo used since 2003 (Note: The oval logo's wordmark has been in use since 2003 until 2017)

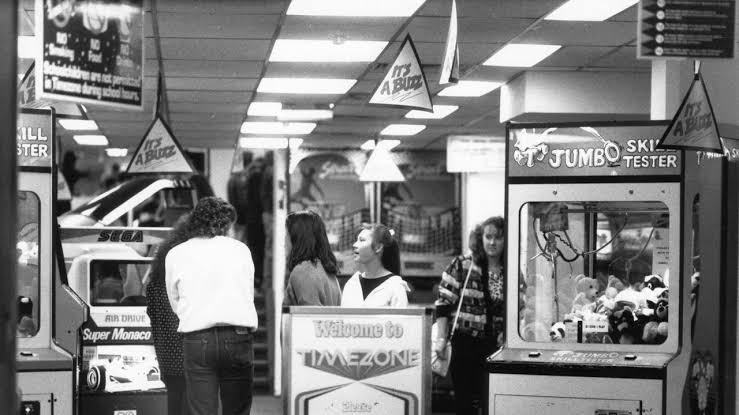
- A Timezone arcade circa 1990
- Type: Subsidiary
- Predecessor: Mystery Pinball
- Founded: 15 May 1978; 48 years ago in Perth, Western Australia
- Founder: Malcolm Steinberg
- Headquarters: Sydney, New South Wales, Australia
- Area served: Australia; New Zealand; India; Singapore; Vietnam; Philippines; Indonesia
- Parent: The Entertainment and Education Group (TEEG)
- Website: www.timezonegames.com

Timezone is an international chain of family entertainment centres and amusement arcade centres based in Australia. It is owned and operated by The Entertainment and Education Group (TEEG). Outside of Australia, Timezone operates in India, New Zealand, Singapore, the Philippines, Indonesia, and Vietnam.

== History ==
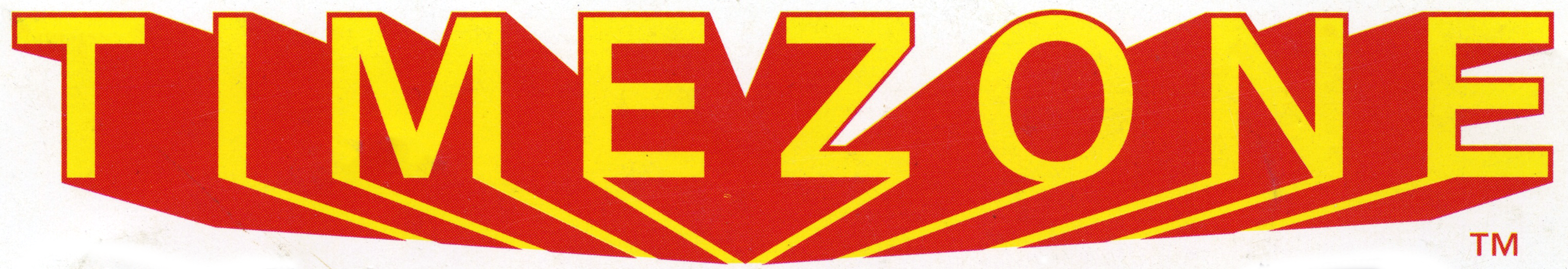
Timezone logo from 1990s with additional oval logo since mid 1990s

In 1958, Malcolm Steinberg's father gave him 21 pinball machines. In Perth, the 18-year-old struck deals to place the pinballs in fish and chip shops and milk bars in exchange for half the earnings.

Steinberg's company Leisure & Allied Industries (LAI), which manufactured and imported arcade games, entered the video game retail market in the early 1970s with its first two stores, Blue Pumpernickel and Crystal Palace. In 1978, Steinberg opened the first Timezone — his first arcade — on Murray Street, Perth. He also relaunched the stores under the new brand. Timezone was successful, reaching a peak of eight stores in Western Australia.

Timezone began to expand outside the state in the early 1980s. From 1989 to 1991, LAI opened 25 locations.

In 1992 Timezone opened its first international arcade in New Zealand, expanding to Indonesia, and Singapore in 1995. Timezone entered the Philippines in 1998.

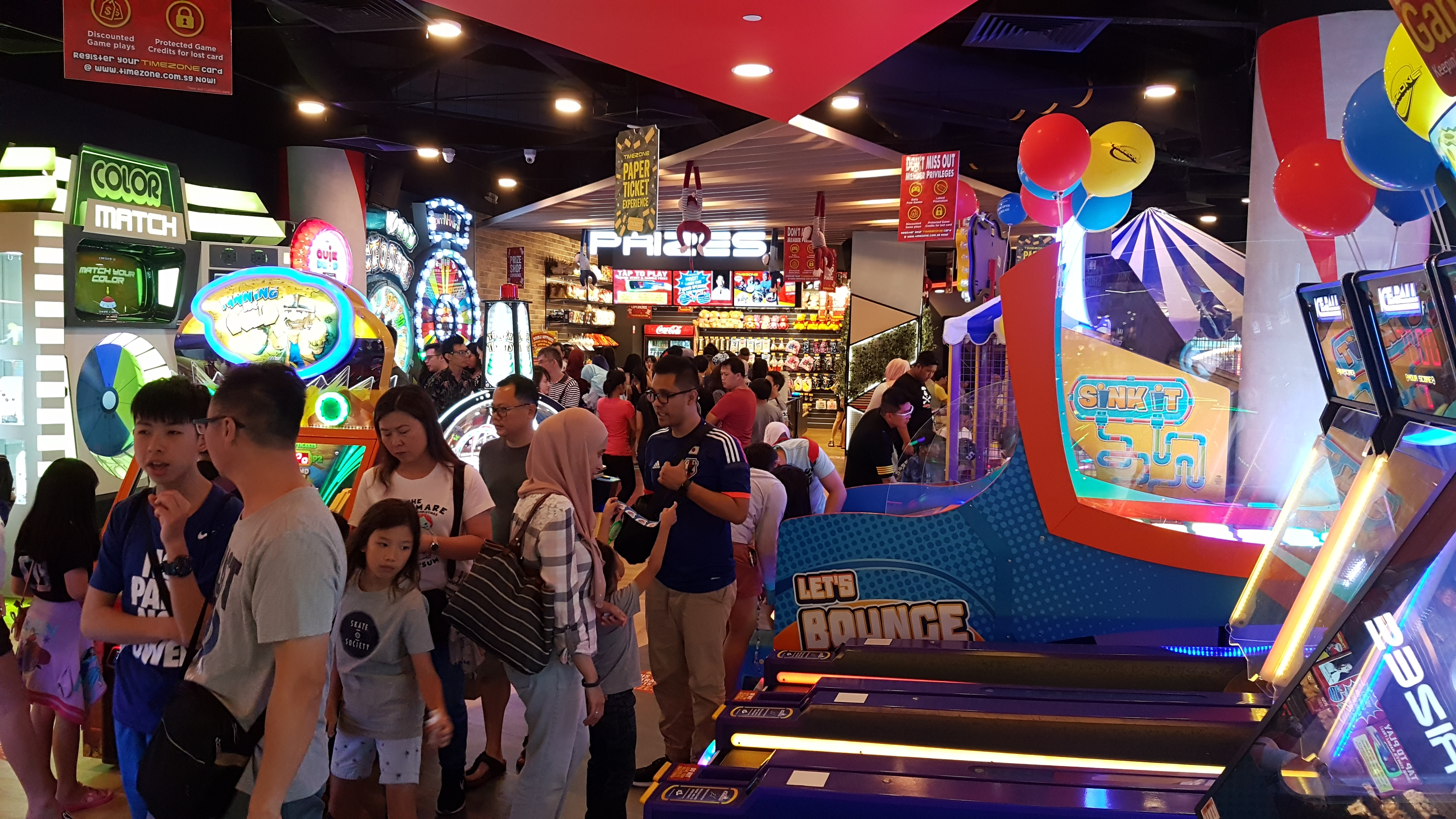
Timezone Arcade in Singapore, 2018

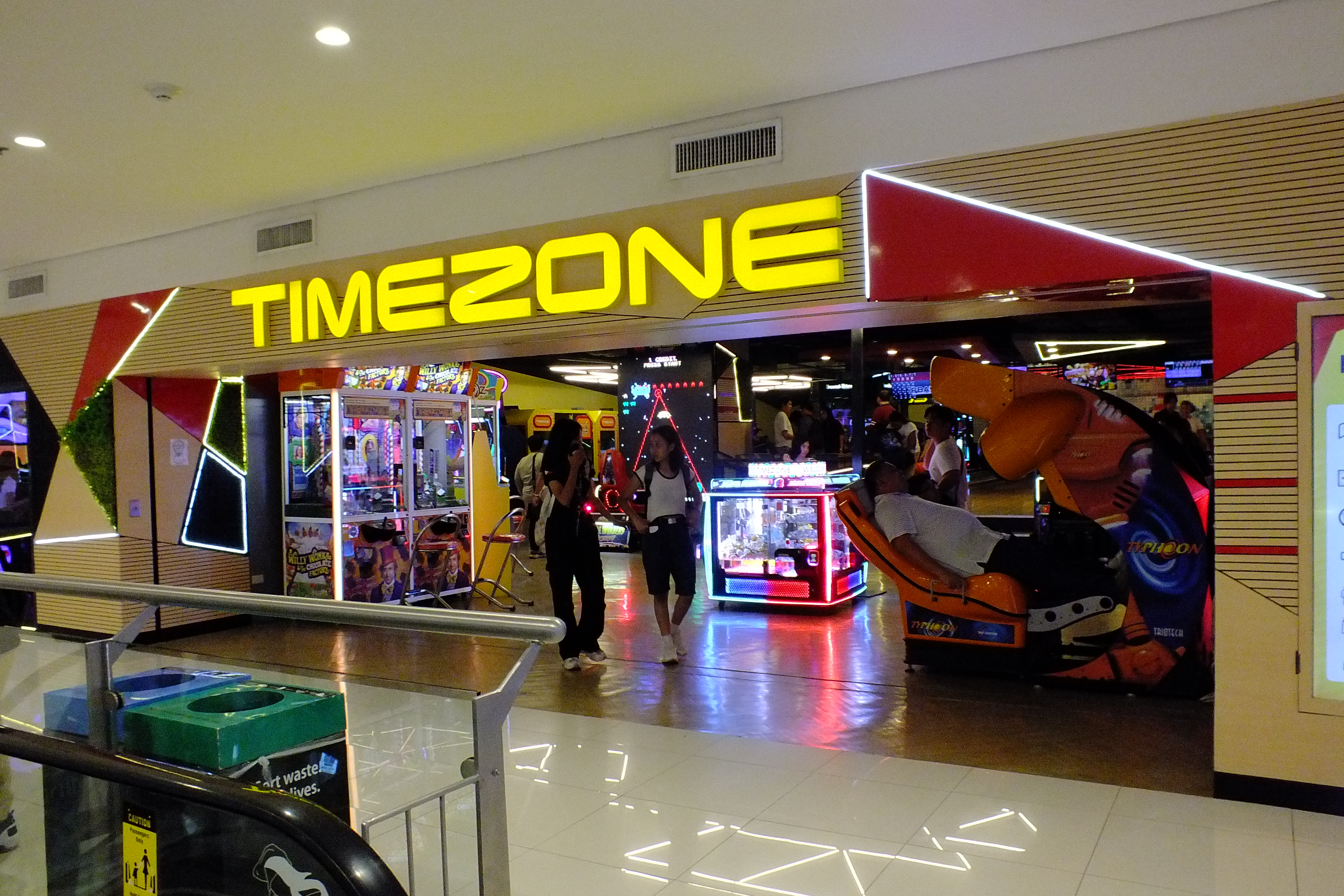
Timezone Arcade at Ayala Malls Central Bloc, Cebu City, Philippines, in 2024

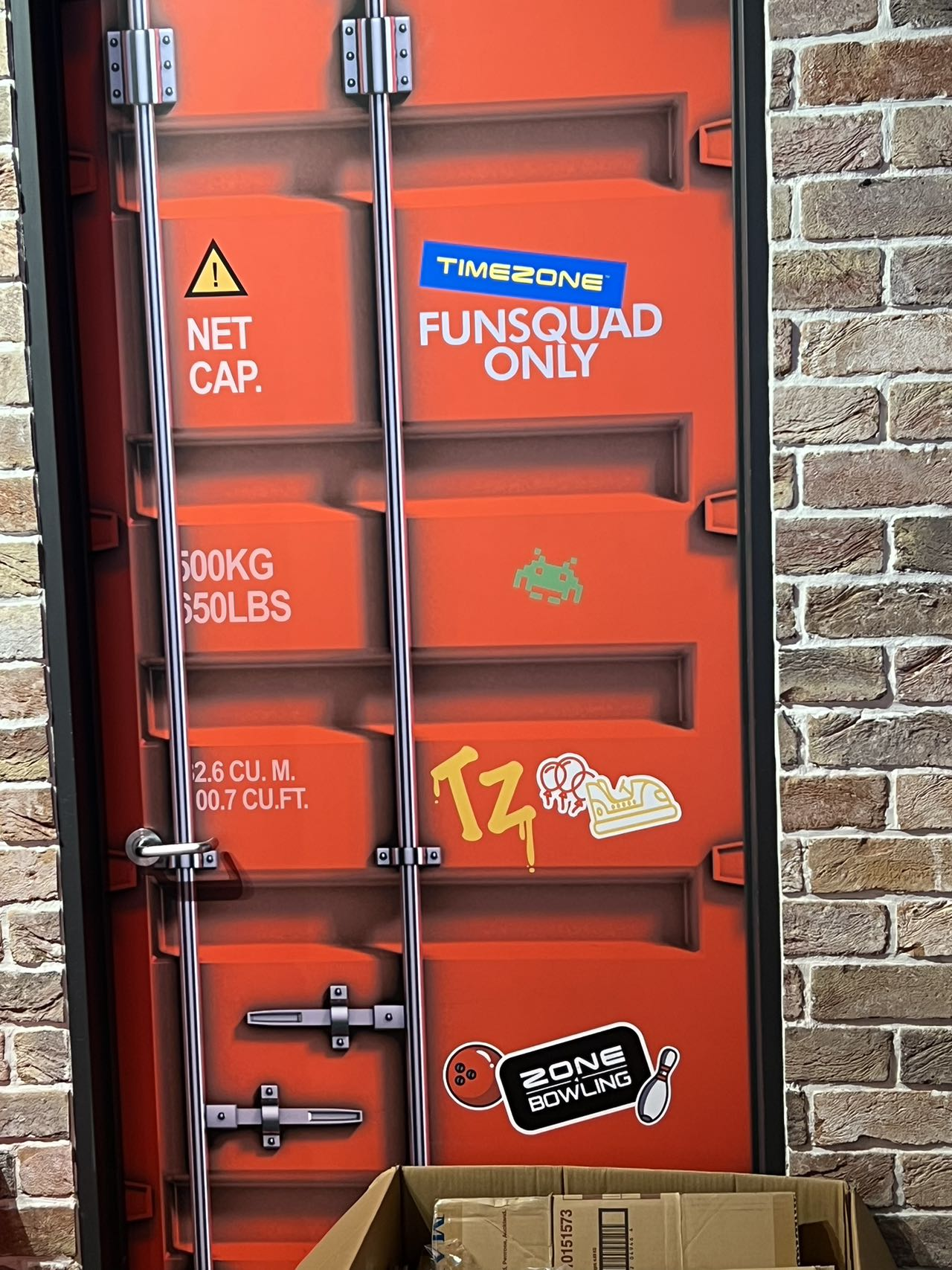
Staff Door at Timezone Henderson in April 2023

In 2003, Timezone Malaysia closed due to collapse of venue after three years of operation, having opened in 1999.

Timezone opened its first Indian arcade at Inorbit Mall in 2004.

In December 2017, TEEG announced that they had purchased the bowling and entertainment division of Ardent Leisure in order to merge it with its Timezone entertainment business, forming a combined entertainment group encompassing Timezone, AMF, Kingpin and Playtime. TEEG now operates in six countries with over 250 locations. All AMF bowling centres in Australia were rebranded as Zone Bowling. Centres in New Zealand were rebranded Xtreme Entertainment.

In February 2018 the chain expanded to Vietnam.

In November 2018, TEEG announced that all Playtimes venues would slowly be rebranded to Timezone. The last Playtime centre converted to Timezone in June 2019.

In February 2019, TEEG opened its first of many dual branded venues of Zone Bowling and Timezone locations in Westfield Garden City.

In 2019, TEEG began rebranding their existing New Zealand bowling centres, Xtreme Entertainment, as dual-branded Zone Bowling and Timezone venues, beginning with their Garden City (Christchurch) venue.

In July 2021, After 20 years, TEEG made Timezone's return into South Australia by opening up a dual branded venue in Woodville, SA. In the same month, TEEG made a deal to purchase multiple TunzaFun locations in South Australia and Victoria and rebrand these to under Timezone venues, with Tea Tree Plaza, Elizabeth, Plenty Valley, and Fountain Gate stores to be rebranded.

Indonesian operations were fully acquired in 2023, previously owned by the Matahari department store.

== Powercard ==
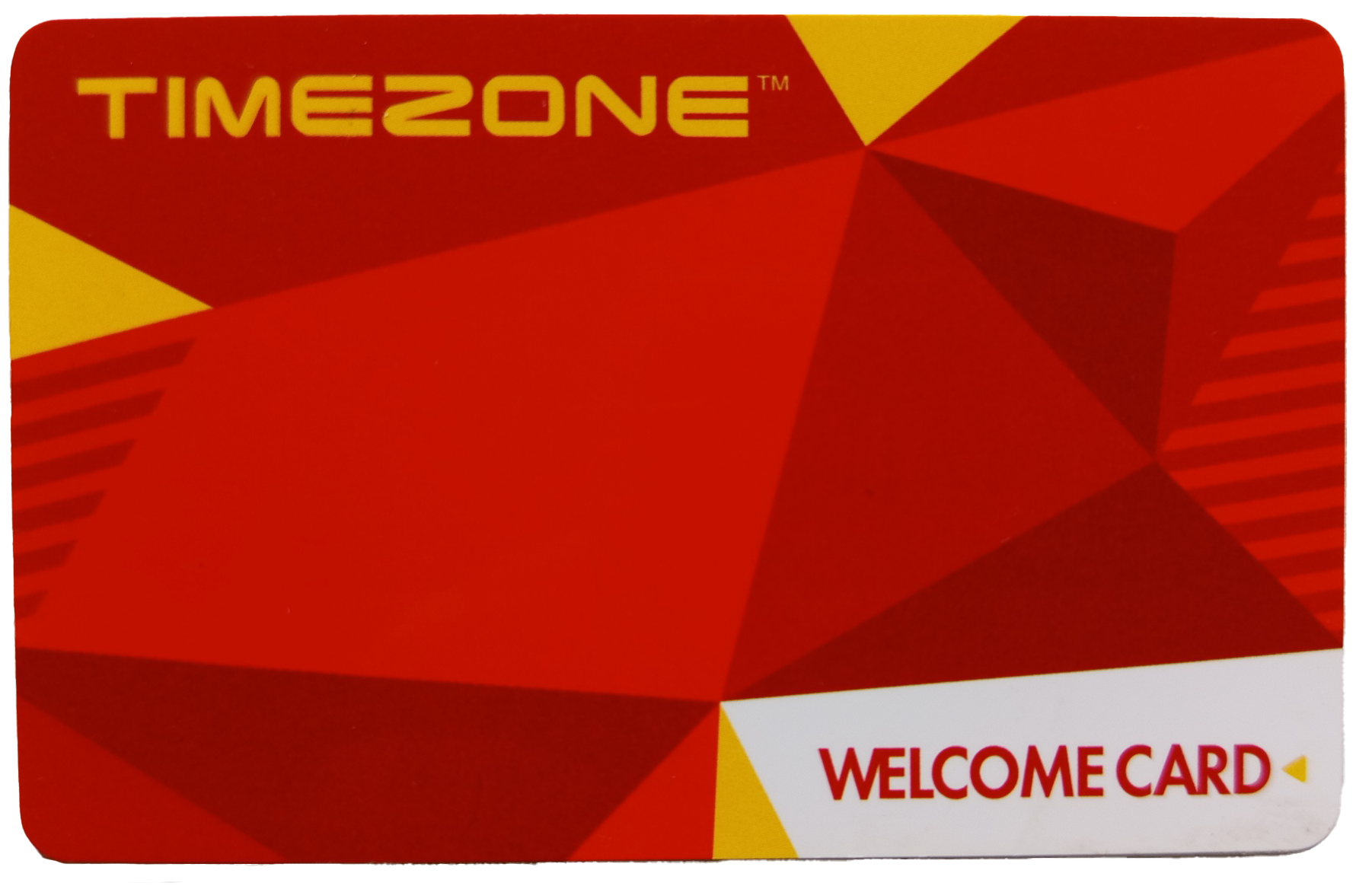
Timezone Welcome Powercard

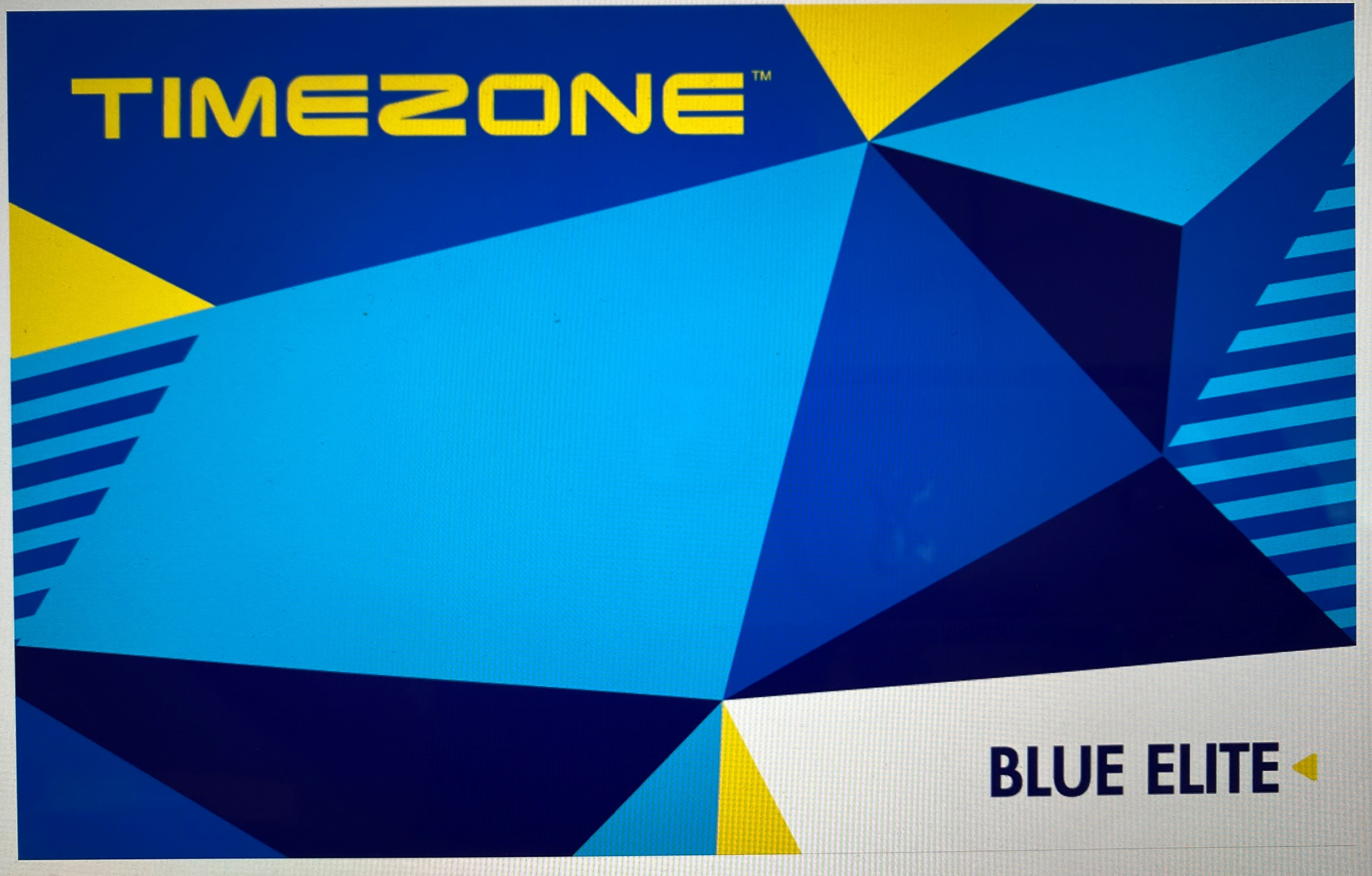
Timezone Blue Elite Powercard

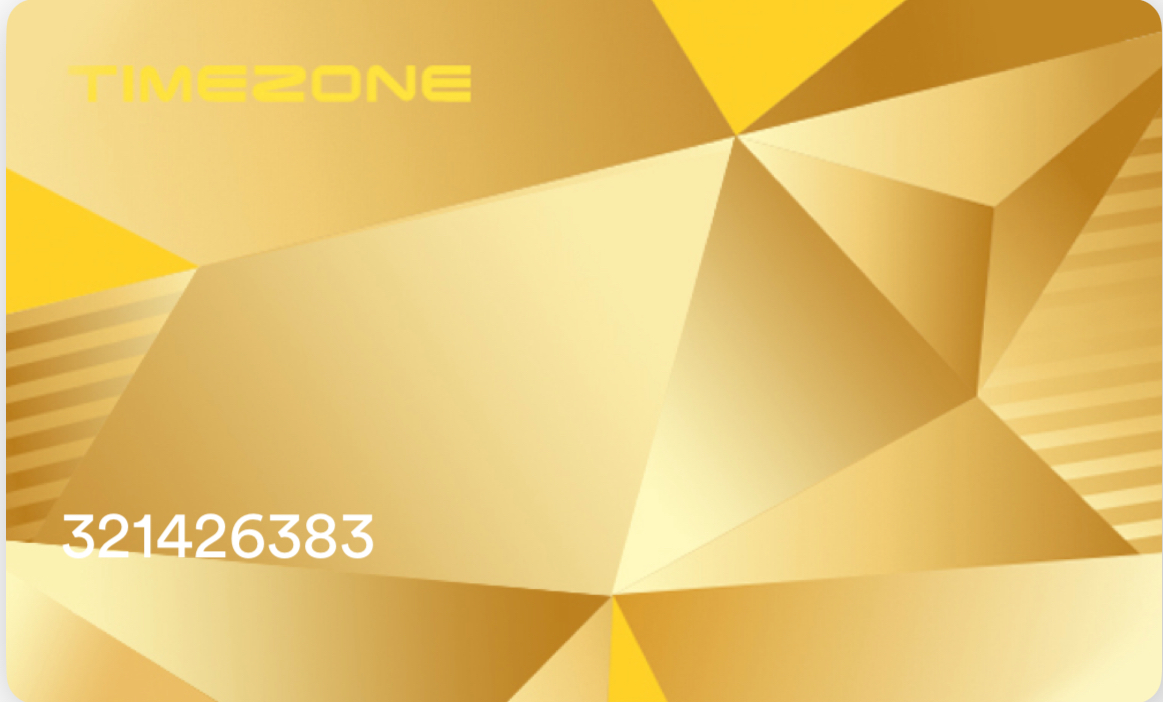
Timezone Gold Powercard

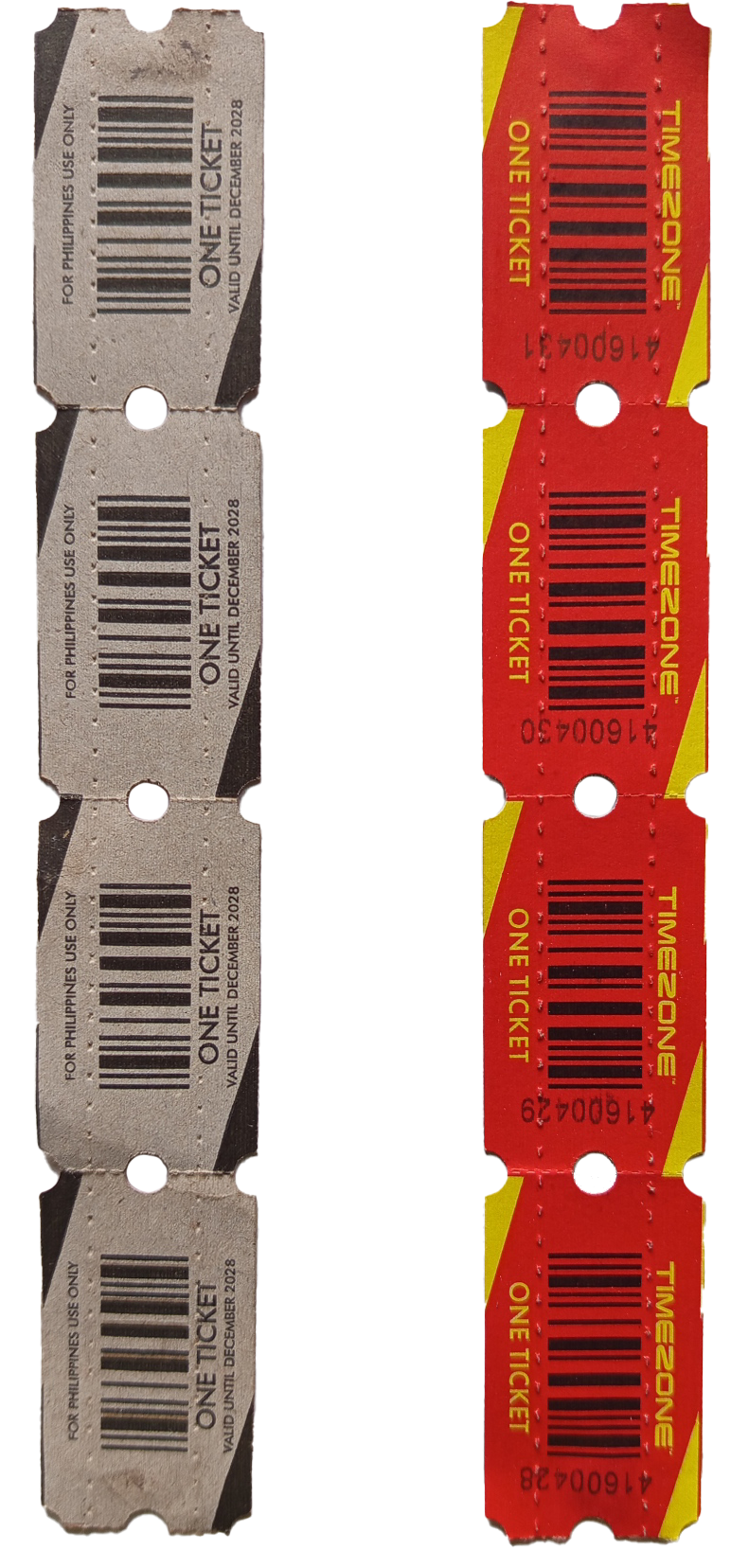
Timezone arcade ticket, back and front, in 2025

Starting from 2000 Timezone arcade system moved to a magnetic swipecard system known as the Timezone Powercard. This meant that customers, rather than having to carry many coins around, could simply deposit a larger amount of money (for example, $10) onto their Powercard account. In order to use an arcade machine, they simply had to swipe their card through a detector located on the machine, and the credit would be deduced from the card account. This system was supplied by Australian company Embed International. Tap-to-play cards are now currently available in the Singapore, Philippines, Vietnam and India franchises and are beginning to be rolled out across Australian franchises as of December 2018. In the Philippines, however, the cards are hybrid tap-and-swipe, as not all branches have tap card compatibility yet. Newer branches have tap-only functionality as default, which will soon be implemented in other stores.

In 2004, paper tickets for ticket redemption arcade machines were replaced with electronic tickets automatically loading on the card. Eventually, tickets were now dispensing again instead of automatically loading on the card, prevalent in the India, Philippines, and Singapore franchises. In the India and Philippines franchises, a rare golden ticket allows the player to earn an extra 500-1000 tickets.

As of 2005, Timezone Powerclub credit in Australia lasted one year from the date of credit and the cards could only be used at the original store of purchase.

As of 2008, after many Timezone stores closed, balances can be used at any venue regardless of where the credit was put on. However, in order to progress to the higher Powerclub levels, customers can only put credit on at the venue which issued the card, or in some franchises, Fun Points can be earned by loading a specific number to reach a certain threshold for upgrade. The exception to this is where the issuing venue has subsequently closed down and a new "home venue" has been selected. Fun Points, which is used in Philippine-based stores, have been abolished on 2022 in favour of a new uniform Timezone Rewards system (also used in other countries) which allows earning of rewards and progression to higher levels freely.

Starting on 27 February 2021, Timezone branches in Indonesia use Tizos as their game currency replace the country's currency.

== Timezone Rewards ==
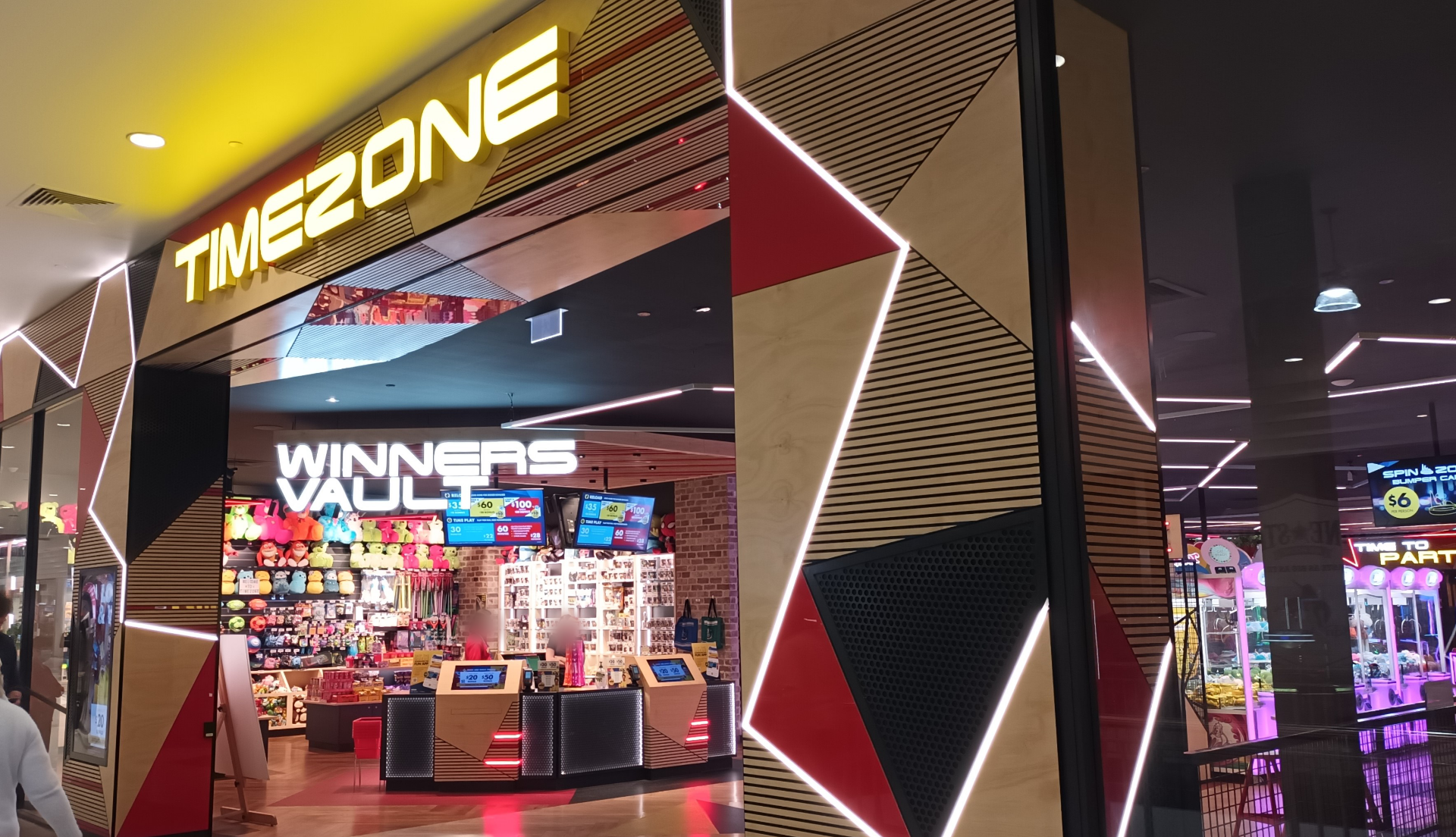
A Timezone amusement arcade at Stockland Rockhampton, 2022

Timezone Rewards is Timezone's loyalty program which offers incentives and benefits according to membership tiers or levels. Qualifying criteria for each tier varies from country to county. The structure in Australia, New Zealand, The Philippines, and Singapore is reflected as:

- Welcome tier

The Timezone Welcome Powercard is the entry tier where members start accumulating reward credits and receiving benefits. The Powercard for this tier is red.

- Blue Elite tier

The Blue Elite is the second tier, upgraded from a Welcome tier, issued when a set cumulative amount has been loaded onto a Powercard. This card offers discounts and extra benefits.

- Gold tier

The Gold tier issued when a set cumulative amount is attained. The Gold tier offers benefits such as bonus game credits, e-tickets and discounts.

- Platinum tier

The Timezone Platinum tier is the highest level. This tier offers VIP pricing on gameplay and extra benefits, such as free games every day and complimentary drinks.
