= Zone Bowling =

Australian operator of ten-pin bowling alleys

- Founded: 1 Sep 1985; 41 years ago
- Parent: The Entertainment and Education Group (TEEG)
- Website: www.zonebowling.com

Zone Bowling is a group of bowling centres in Australia and New Zealand currently owned and operated by the Entertainment and Education Group (TEEG). Zone Bowling has 34 locations across Australia, and three locations across New Zealand.

== History ==
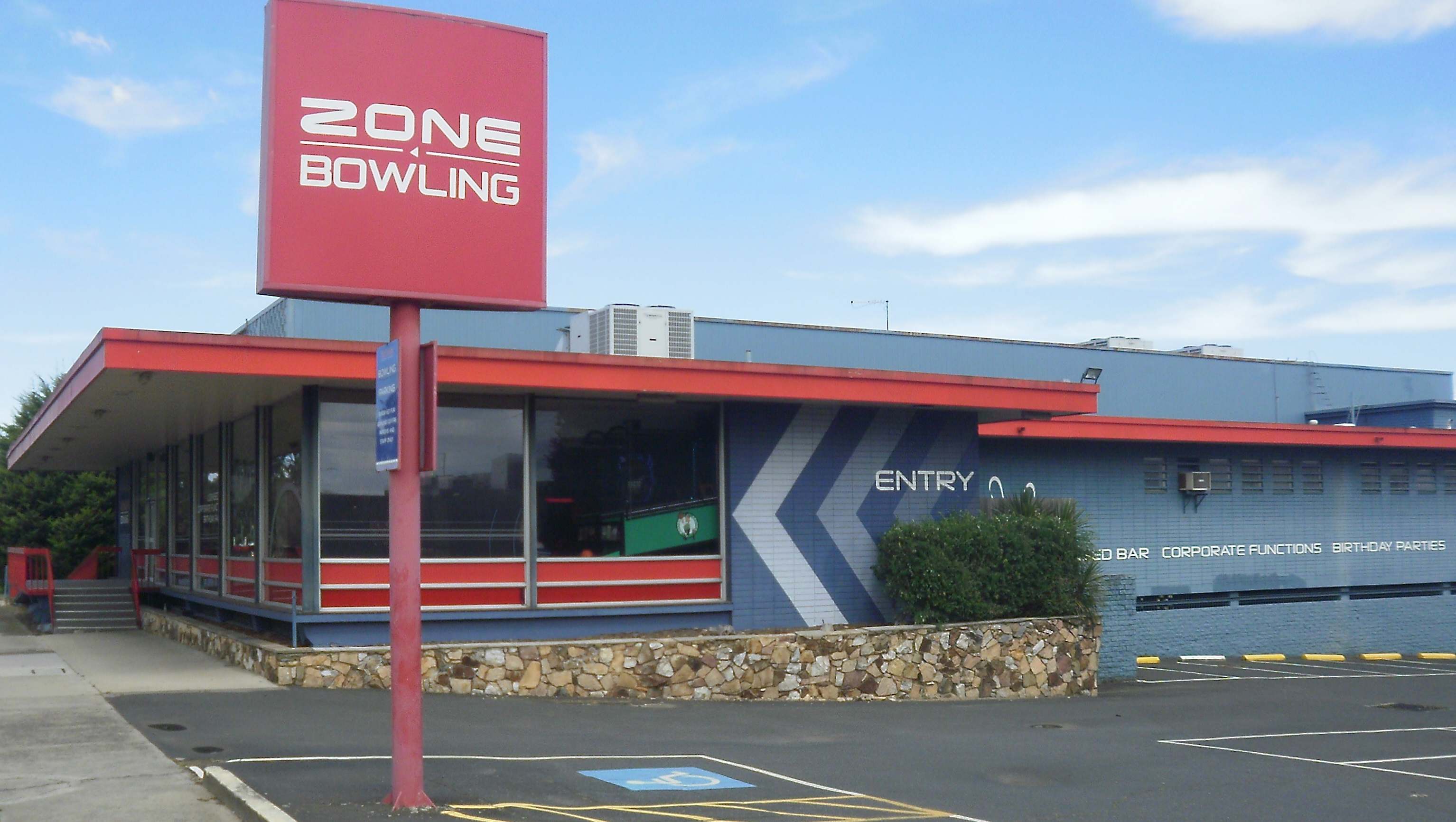
Zone Bowling in Moorabbin

Originally known as AMF Bowling Australia, originating as the Australian part of the bowling division of American Machine and Foundry (AMF). AMF began a joint venture to manufacture pinspotters in Australia in 1959 in view of the growing popularity of ten-pin bowling in the country at the time. By 1964 1,600 bowling lanes existed in Australia, but the popularity of the sport had begun to decline.

In 1985 a group of private investors in Richmond, Virginia, United States purchased the bowling division of American Machine and Foundry to form AMF Bowling Companies, Inc. (later known as AMF Bowling Worldwide). The company then bought two major Australian bowling chains to revive interest in bowling. AMF Australia expanded from 16 bowling centres to 30 by 1987, and to over 40 by 2004.

AMF Bowling Worldwide sold its Australian division of to Macquarie Leisure Trust (later known as Ardent Leisure) in February 2005 as part of AMF's strategy at the time to re-focus on its US bowling business.

In December 2017, TEEG announced that they had purchased Ardent Leisure's bowling and entertainment division for A$160 million in order to merge it with its Timezone entertainment business, forming a combined entertainment group encompassing Timezone, AMF, Kingpin and Playtime. All AMF bowling centres in Australia were rebranded as Zone Bowling.

In February 2019, TEEG opened its first of many dual branded venues of Zone Bowling and Timezone locations in Westfield Garden City. TEEG now has 15 dual venue locations which offer both Zone Bowling and Timezone.
