= Frankston, Victoria =

Frankston Karrum Karrum (Boonwurrung)
- Suburb
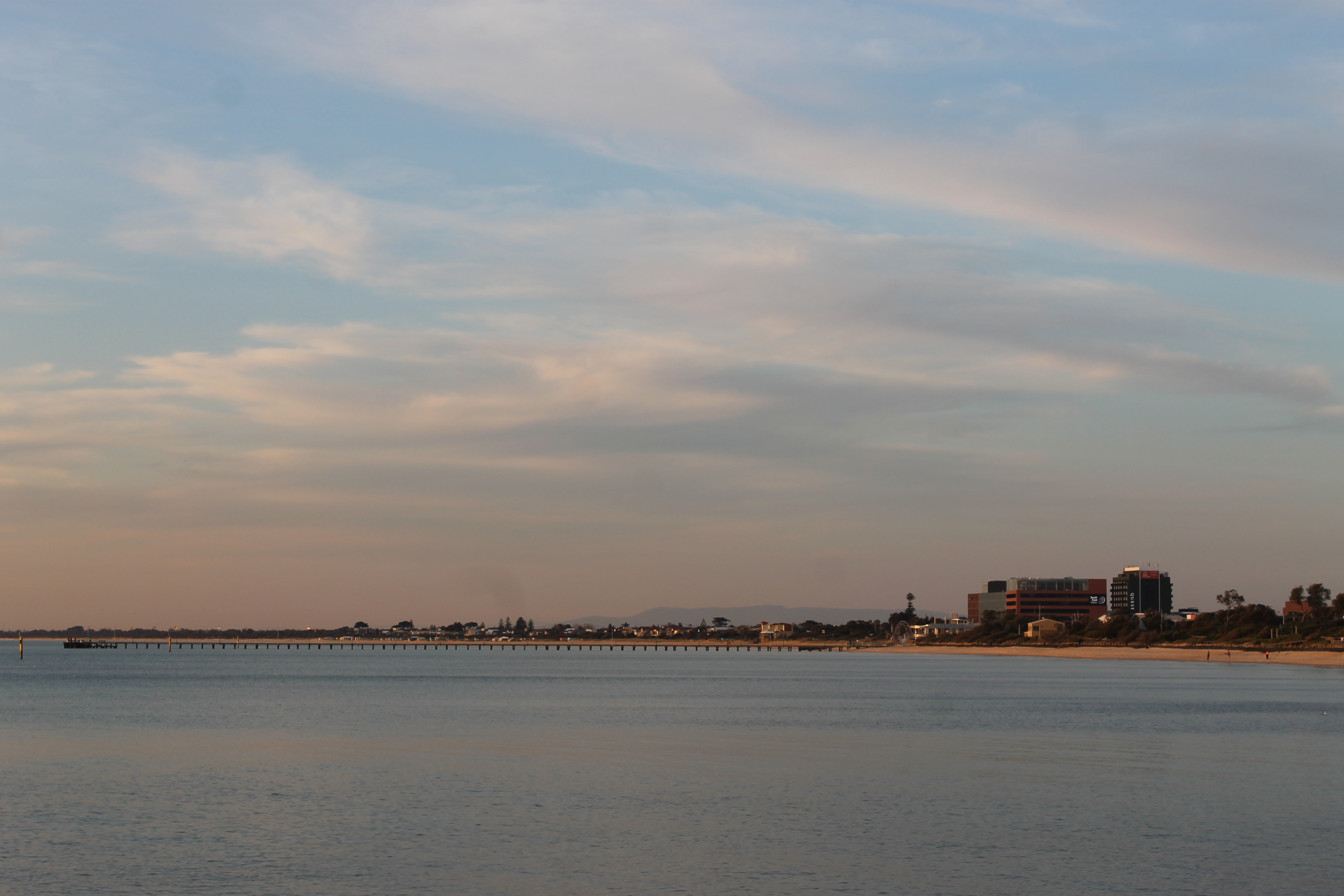
- Frankston Pier and Central Business District viewed from the base of Olivers Hill in 2015.

- Interactive map of Frankston
- Coordinates: 38°8′0″S 145°7′0″E
- Country: Australia
- State: Victoria
- City: Melbourne
- LGA: Frankston City
- Location: 39 km (24 mi) south-east of Melbourne central business district; 21 km (13 mi) south-west of Dandenong; 11 km (6.8 mi) north-east of Mornington; 21 km (13 mi) north-west of Hastings; 17 km (11 mi) south-west of Cranbourne
- Established: 29 May 1854

Government
  - State electorate: Frankston
  - Federal division: Dunkley

Area
  - Total: 20.8 km^{2} (8.0 sq mi)
- Elevation: 11 m (36 ft)

Population
  - Total: 37,331 (SAL 2021)
- Time zone: UTC+10 (AEST)
  - Summer (DST): UTC+11 (AEDT)
- Postcode: 3199
- County: Mornington
Suburbs around Frankston
Port Phillip	Seaford	Frankston North
Port Phillip	Frankston	Langwarrin
Port Phillip	Frankston South	Langwarrin South

Frankston (/ˈfræŋkstən/ FRANK-stən) is a suburb in Melbourne, Victoria, Australia. Located 39 km (24 mi) south-east of the Melbourne central business district, it is in the local government area of the City of Frankston and serves as its administrative and activity centres.

Positioned on the eastern shoreline of Port Phillip, Frankston became a popular seaside destination of Melbourne in the 1880s. Its beach continues to be one of the most frequented in Victoria, and is recognised as one of the cleanest in Australia. Due to its proximity to the north of the eponymous wine and tourism region, the suburb is also referred to as the "gateway to the Mornington Peninsula".

The traditional custodians of the lands on which Frankston is situated are the Boonwurrung people of the Kulin nation, to which it was an important source of fish and meeting place of the Mayone-bulluk clan for around 40,000 years. Colonisation of the area by Europeans began at approximately the same time as the foundation of Melbourne in 1835 and started as an informal fishing outpost supplying the growing settlement. It was formally established in 1854, when official land sales for a new village first took place on 29 May, and has subsequently given its name to its broader local government area since 1893.

Neighbourhood areas within the suburb are Frankston Central, Frankston East, Frankston Heights, Karingal, Long Island, Mount Erin and Olivers Hill. At the 2021 census, Frankston had a population of 37,331. Its demonym is Frankstonian.

== Toponymy ==
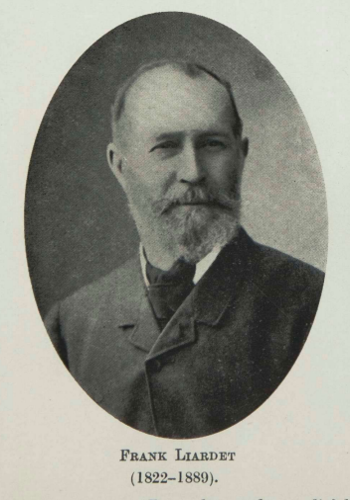
Frank Liardet, an early settler that Frankston is possibly named after.

The toponymic origins of Frankston are subject to conjecture, and of which there are four popular theories. One of the earliest of these theories (published in the Victorian Historical Magazine in March 1916) is that it was named after one of its early European settlers, Frank Liardet, who also became one of its first official land owners. The Liardets were prominent pioneers of early Melbourne and arrived aboard the William Metcalfe from England in 1839. Liardet's father, Wilbraham, founded what is now the Melbourne inner suburb of Port Melbourne and the family established and managed hotels around Melbourne as well as the first mail service of the early township.

Frank Liardet settled in the Frankston area in 1847, after taking out a 300-acre depasturing license for land that is now the Frankston locality of Karingal. During this time, Liardet built the first wooden house in the Frankston area—which would later become part of his Ballam Park estate after the formal land sales of 1854. Prior to settling in the area, Liardet had also worked on the cattle run of the first Postmaster of the Port Phillip District, Captain Benjamin Baxter, which was located over what are now the City of Frankston suburbs of Langwarrin and Langwarrin South. By the time Liardet had taken out his depasturing license for the Frankston area in 1847 an unofficial fishing village was also developing around its foreshore.

Considering Frank Liardet's early presence in the Frankston area, and his connections to the early mail services of Melbourne, it is plausible that "Frank's Town" became nomenclature for describing the area and its unofficial village. As a consequence it is possible that the name of "Frankston" was further adapted from it when officially naming the village for its formal land sales in 1854.

However, in a letter to the editor of The Argus newspaper (published on 30 May 1916) a member of the Liardet family said that this was in fact not true. In the letter was excerpts of correspondence between the Liardet family and the Victorian state Department of Lands and Survey which refuted the theory. Instead, it puts forward the theory that Frankston was named after the Irish-born settler Charles Franks; who was the first European to be killed by Indigenous Australians in Melbourne.

Charles Franks arrived in Melbourne aboard the Champion from Van Diemen's Land in 1836 and made a squatter's claim to land on the western side of Port Phillip near Mount Cottrel (northeast of what is now the Melbourne outer-western suburb of Wyndham Vale). Franks' land neighboured that of the early Melbourne explorer and surveyor John Helder Wedge, which was managed by his nephew Charles Wedge—prior to him gaining a pre-emptive right to land license of his own for the Frankston area. The correspondence with the Department of Lands and Survey states that, at the time of surveying the area for the land sales of 1854, the name "Frankston" was probably suggested to honour the Wedge's deceased former neighbour.

Another theory—that has become folklore—is that Frankston was named after a pub named "Frank Stone's Hotel". In 1929 the author Don Charlwood, a student of Frankston High School at the time, compiled a history of Frankston using both local records and oral sources supporting the theory (published in The Frankston & Somerville Standard newspaper on 8 February 1930).

The pub to which Charlwood refers was originally named the Cannanuke Inn and was the first permanent building in the Frankston area. It was built by the pre-emptive Frankston settler James Davey in the 1840s. The Victorian Heritage Database states that it was located on the present site of the Frankston Mechanics' Institute; at 1 Plowman Place in the Frankston Central Business District (CBD). According to Charlwood, it was purchased by a "Mr. Stone" in the early-1850s who, after the birth of his son, "Frank", renamed it "Frank Stone's Hotel" and around which the village developed and also had its name adapted from for its formal land sales in 1854.

As there appear to be no licensing records for the Cannanuke Inn, it is difficult to determine if this is in fact true. However, Charlwood does mention that Stone had purchased the Cannanuke Inn from "a man named Standring". Licensing records state that Benjamin Standring was the owner of the Frankston Hotel from 1857 to 1860. Also, according to the terms of his pre-emptive right to land licence, Davey did not have the right to sell or sub-let the Cannanuke Inn. It is therefore unlikely that Stone purchased or leased the Cannanuke Inn from Davey or Standring before the formal land sales for Frankston in 1854—and after which the name "Frankston" was already in use.

A more recent theory, put forward by the author and historian Michael Jones in his local history book Frankston: Resort to City (published in 1989), is that Frankston was named after the heroic British army general Sir Thomas Harte Franks. The theory is strengthened by the fact that a number of places near Frankston also have names that are derived or adapted from those of British army generals and statesmen (such as Cranbourne, Hastings, Lyndhurst, Mornington and Pakenham). Jones states that the Surveyor General of Victoria from 1853 to 1858, Sir Andrew Clarke, named all of these places.

== History ==
=== Pre-history ===
==== Indigenous history ====
Prior to the foundation of Melbourne by Europeans in 1835, the area surrounding Port Phillip was originally populated by Indigenous Australians of the Kulin nation for an estimated 31,000 to 40,000 years. Particularly, the Frankston area was inhabited primarily by the Mayone-bulluk clan from the Bunurong tribe of the Kulin nation.

The tribes of the Kulin nation were a nomadic people with no sedentary settlements. As a result, there is minimal physical evidence of their past. The Bunurong tribe in particular were mainly hunter-gatherers that maintained an ecologically sustainable tradition of travelling between areas of seasonally abundant resources. For the Mayone-bulluk clan; Kananook and Sweetwater creeks and the former swamps and wetlands of the Frankston area were rich sources of fish and eel as well as summer fruit and vegetables. An important meeting place for the Bunurong tribe clans of the greater Mornington Peninsula region was the present site of the Frankston Mechanics' Institute, at 1 Plowman Place in the Frankston Central Business District (CBD), which was used for corroborees and as a trading place.

Bunurong territory, of which Frankston is a part, stretches from the Werribee River in the western metropolitan area of Melbourne east to Wilsons Promontory in Gippsland and was referred to as marr-ne-beek ("excellent country") amongst the Kulin nation tribes. According to the Indigenous Australian mythology of the Dreamtime, the Bunurong territory was created by the ancestor spirit Lohan. Patrilineally, all Bunurong tribe members are considered direct descendants of Lohan. The creator of the Kulin nation-proper was the deity eaglehawk spirit Bunjil, and the protector of its waterways and keeper of the wind was the trickster crow spirit Waa.

Bunjil and Waa are the two moiety totems that govern the kinship system of the Kulin nation tribes. The Mayone-bulluk clan of the Frankston area was closely linked through marriage to the Wurundjeri-balluk clan of the Melbourne central business district, from the neighbouring Woiwurrung tribe, based on this system. Two wooden sculptures of eagles, inspired by Bunjil, by artist Bruce Armstrong; a 5-metre version on Mayone-bulluk clan land, erected on Young Street in Frankston in 2001, and a 25-metre version on Wurundjeri-balluk clan land, erected on Wurundjeri Way in Melbourne Docklands in 2002, are representative of this link.

The earliest recorded encounter of the Bunurong tribe with Europeans in the Frankston area was in early 1803, when Captain Charles Robbins sailed his ship the Cumberland into Port Phillip on the surveying expedition headed by Charles Grimes. On 30 January, Grimes went ashore at Kananook Creek in search of fresh water and made peaceful contact with "around 30 of the natives"—most likely members of the Mayone-bulluk clan.

Another possible encounter of the Mayone-bulluk clan with Europeans in 1803 was in late-December, with three convicts that had escaped from the failed settlement by Captain David Collins at Sorrento on the southern Mornington Peninsula. Among the escapees was William Buckley, who later lived with the Wadawurrung-balug clan from the neighbouring Wathaurong tribe of the Kulin nation for 32 years. After travelling north up the Mornington Peninsula for two days, Buckley describes coming to a creek that ran "near to the bay"—most likely Kananook Creek and Long Island in the Frankston area—where they encountered a "large tribe of the natives...armed with spears" but did not make direct contact.

The number of Bunurong tribe members at the time of contact with Europeans in the 1800s was estimated to be 300. James Fleming, a member of Charles Grimes' surveying expedition in early 1803, reported observing smallpox scars on members of the Kulin nation tribes he had encountered—indicating that an epidemic had affected them prior to 1803. Smallpox arrived in Australia with the First Fleet in 1788 and reached the Port Phillip area in 1790, via the first European settlement in Australia at Port Jackson, claiming at least half the population of the combined Kulin nation tribes.

Following permanent European settlement in 1835, another smallpox epidemic reduced the number of Bunurong tribe members to 83 by 1839. An influenza epidemic during the 1840s further reduced their number to 28 by 1850. The last full-blood member of the Bunurong tribe, Yam-mer-book, also known as Jimmy Dunbar (from the Ngaruk-Willam clan, which was geographically close to the Mayone-bulluk clan) who lived to the north of Frankston near Mordialloc, died of natural causes in 1877.

==== European settlement ====
Fishermen were among the earliest Europeans to unofficially settle the Frankston area following the foundation of Melbourne on 30 August 1835. Living in tents and wattle and daub huts on its foreshore and around the base of Olivers Hill, they would travel by boat to the early Melbourne township to sell their catches.

James Davey arrived in the Frankston area in 1840, gaining a 640 acre pre-emptive right to land license over what are now the suburbs of Frankston and Frankston South from Olivers Hill south to Daveys Bay. Davey built the Cannanuke Inn in the mid-1840s, which was the first permanent building in the Frankston area, and was located on the site of the present Frankston Mechanics' Institute at 1 Plowman Place in the Frankston Central Business District (CBD). He built the first permanent wooden house in the southern Frankston area located near Daveys Bay on Olivers Hill in 1851—which was originally known as "Old Man Davey's Hill".

In 1843 Frank Liardet, the eldest son of the early Melbourne settler Wilbraham Liardet, took out a 300-acre depasturing license for what is now the Frankston locality of Karingal. Liardet built the first permanent wooden house in the eastern Frankston area in 1847—which would later become part of his Ballam Park estate after the formal land sales of 1854.

Davey later partnered in the cattle run of Captain Benjamin Baxter, the first Postmaster and former Clerk of Petty sessions for the Port Phillip District, during the early-1850s. Their run covered the majority of what are now the City of Frankston suburbs of Langwarrin and Langwarrin South. The fisherman James Oliver built his house on northern Olivers Hill around this time, so he could keep watch for schools of fish in the waters below, and after whom the locality is now known by its current name. The explorer and surveyor Charles Wedge also arrived around this time, gaining a pre-emptive right to land license over what are now the City of Frankston suburbs of Carrum Downs and Seaford.

Thomas and Grace McComb arrived in the Frankston area in 1852. Thomas assisted with the development of the local fishing industry, and Grace was the first nurse and midwife in the area. Thomas Ritchie arrived in 1854 and established a bakery that same year on what is now Nepean Highway in the Frankston CBD.

The central Frankston area was surveyed by Thomas Hanbury Permein for the Victorian colonial government in early 1854. The only pre-existing permanent building in Permein's survey is the Cannanuke Inn. The plan for the new village of Frankston was drawn by James Philp from the Office of the Surveyor General of Victoria on 1 May 1854—with the Cannanuke Inn as a central point and located on Lot 1 of a block bordered to the west by Bay Street, to the north by Davey Street, to the east by Wedge Street (now Young Street) and to the south by a public reserve (now Plowman Place and Frankston Park). Philp's plan consisted of 29 standard lots, 49 suburban lots, nine country lots of 430 acres, and also reserved place for a village centre that would eventually become the Frankston CBD.

The first formal land sales for the new village of Frankston took place on 29 May 1854. Frankston was gazetted in late-April of that year as being "well watered with springs...the odour and flavour of the water being remarkable". The road to Melbourne was extended from Brighton to Frankston (now the Nepean Highway) with bridges over Kananook Creek and Mordialloc Creek in late 1854.

Liardet became one of the first official land owners in Frankston after the formal land sales—establishing his Ballam Park estate on the land that he had a depasturing license for. There is a popular theory (published in the Victorian Historical Magazine in March 1916) that Frankston was named after Liardet due to his earlier presence in the area.

=== 19th century ===
Following the first formal land sales for the new village on 29 May 1854, on 12 December, Samuel Packham was granted the licence to establish the Frankston Hotel. Licensing records (and newspaper articles) suggest that it was located on what is now the northwest corner of Davey Street and Nepean Highway (the present site of the Pier Hotel). Packham advertised the Frankston Hotel as a country retreat, and employed a kangaroo tracker and organised game hunting expeditions from the hotel.

Charles Wedge established his Banyan sheep station on his pre-emptive right to land over what are now the City of Frankston suburbs of Carrum Downs and Seaford after the formal land sales of 1854, and James McMahon purchased lands over what are now the City of Frankston suburbs of Sandhurst and Skye at this time.

The first permanent brick house in Frankston was built at Ballam Park in 1855 and replaced the 1847 wooden house on the site. It was built by Frederick Liardet, the younger brother of Frank, and was designed in a French Colonial Gothic Revival style by their father Wilbraham. The house is listed on the Victorian and Australian heritage registries through the National Trust of Australia. It is now managed by the Frankston Historical Society which conducts tours of the house and also maintains a local history museum at the estate.

A site for a Church of England (Anglican) was reserved after the formal land sales. Located on the corner of what is now Bay Street and High Street in the Frankston CBD, the two acre site also included an area for a school as well as a temporary burial ground. A temporary hall was built in 1856 and served as both a place of worship and as a school (which later became the Woodleigh School). The first post office in Frankston opened on 1 September 1857 which also initially operated from the hall.

==== Early economy ====
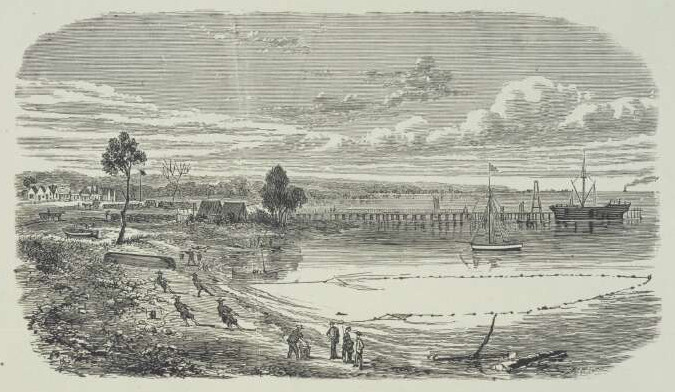
Frankston Beach in 1873, with the pier and village in the background.

Frankston's fishing industry was further developed with the assistance of Thomas McComb, who funded the construction of Frankston Pier in 1857. Following a petition by residents, to the Victorian colonial Department of Public Works, the pier was extended into deeper water in 1863. A gaslamp was installed at the end of the pier and a lamplighter was also employed. Frankston Fish Company was founded in 1867, by a consortium of local businessmen including Thomas Ritchie, in order to transport the catches of local fishermen in bulk to the fish markets of the Melbourne city centre.

In 1870, Ritchie established his first general store on what is now the southwest corner of Playne Street and Nepean Highway in the Frankston Central Business District (CBD). Ritchies Stores is now the largest independent grocery chain in Australia—with its headquarters still located in the Frankston area.

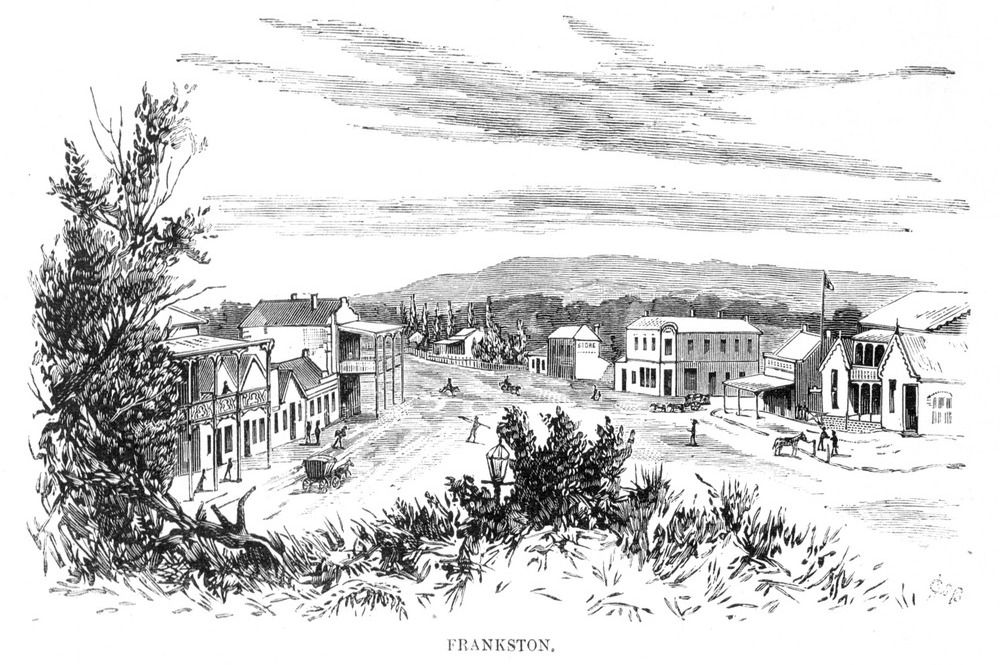
Main Street of Frankston in 1886. The Pier Hotel is on the fore-left and the Bay View Hotel is on the mid-right.

On 15 November 1873, William Davey Jr., grandson of pre-emptive Frankston settler James Davey, applied for the license to establish the Bay View Hotel, on what is now the northeast corner of Davey Street and Nepean Highway (the present site of The Grand Hotel) in the Frankston CBD. It was constructed with a guest house which Davey had shipped from Jersey.

Following a petition by residents to the Victorian colonial Department of Education in 1873, headed by Grace McComb, the first government school in Frankston was built on Davey Street in 1874. The No. 1464 Frankston School (Which later became Frankston Primary School) opened on 1 November of that year with an initial enrolment of 45 students.

Mark Young purchased the Frankston Hotel on 13 August 1875 for £380, and renamed it the Pier Hotel (under which name it continues to operate). Young spent an estimated £3700 on improvements to the hotel, making it one of the finest in the colony of Victoria at the time.

In 1879, following a conference of city councils in inner-Melbourne, the Frankston area was chosen as the preferred site to replace the Melbourne General Cemetery. The roughly 3000 acre Crown land site was bordered to the north by Charles Wedge's Banyan sheep station (over what are now the City of Frankston suburbs of Carrum Downs and Seaford), to the south by Frank Liardet's Ballam Park estate (in what is now the Frankston locality of Karingal), and is now the suburb of Frankston North. Its south-west corner is described as being "about a mile [1.6 km] north of the village of Frankston, and the same distance east of the beach".

Frankston Mechanics' Institute was established on the former site of the Cannanuke Inn, at what is now 1 Plowman Place in the Frankston CBD, in 1880. Its construction was funded by public donations, headed by a residents' committee, and supported by friendly and temperance societies including a Frankston group of Freemasons and the Independent Order of Good Templars, Independent Order of Rechabites and Manchester Unity of Oddfellows. Its foundation stone was laid by committee president Mark Young on 22 March of that year, and the building was opened on 24 May at a cost of £280.

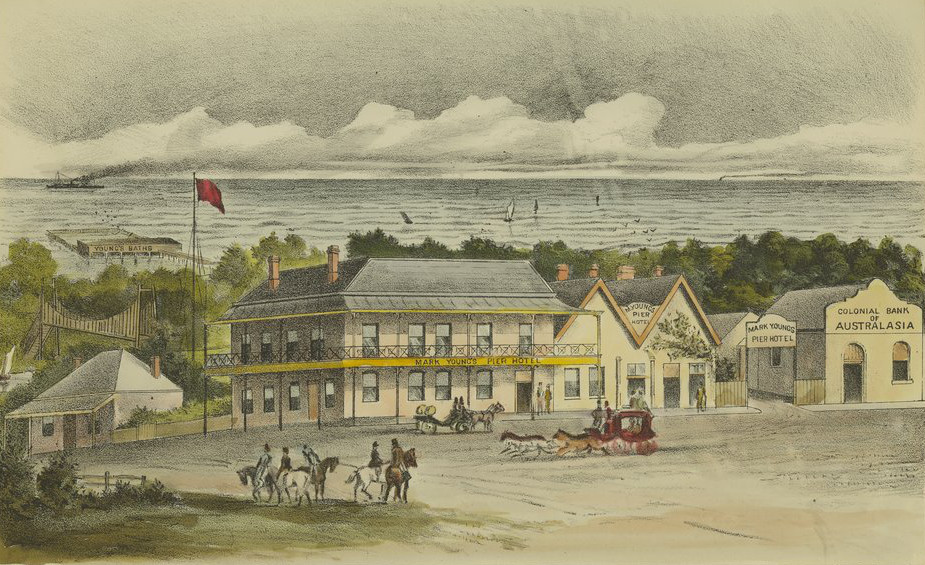
Mark Young's Pier Hotel as well as the Colonial Bank of Australasia in the seaside resort of Frankston in 1888.

On 16 March 1881, the Colonial Bank of Australasia (later the National Bank of Australia) was the first bank to open a lending branch in Frankston. It was located next to Mark Young's Pier Hotel on what is now Nepean Highway. The first library in Frankston, the Frankston Free Library, opened at the Mechanics' Institute to mark its first anniversary. The first 400 books of the new library were a donation from the banker H.D. Larnach.

To service the proposed new metropolitan cemetery the railway line to Melbourne was extended from Caulfield to Frankston between 1881 and 1882. The first section from Caulfield to Mordialloc opened on 19 December 1881. The second section from Mordialloc to Frankston opened on 29 July 1882. The course of the railway line was directly influenced by the location of the proposed cemetery. From Mordialloc to Seaford it runs adjacent to what is now Nepean Highway—which was built over a 1000-year-old sand dune that once ran parallel to the coastline. After Seaford it curves inland eastwards to where a "mortuary station" was to be located (now Kananook railway station) near the border of the proposed cemetery, then continues to Frankston.

Due to concerns from undertakers about sandy soil and underlying granite at the Frankston site, the proposed cemetery was abandoned—which was later established in the Melbourne southeastern suburb of Springvale in 1901. It was also briefly considered as one of the possible sites to replace the Melbourne Benevolent Asylum in 1887—which was later established in the southeastern suburb of Cheltenham in 1911.

==== Seaside resort ====
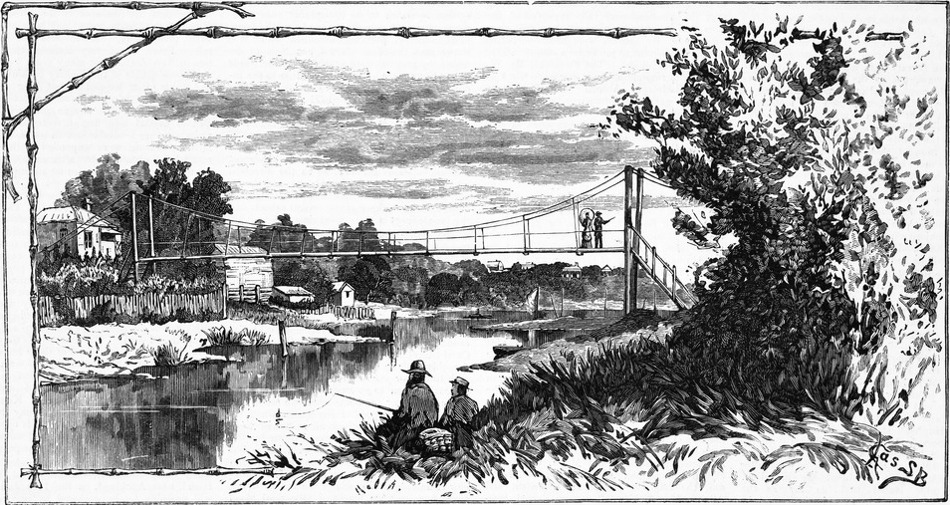
Mark Young's suspension bridge over Kananook Creek connecting the Pier Hotel to the sea baths off Frankston Beach.

Despite not becoming the site of the new metropolitan cemetery, Frankston benefited from its new railway line. The travel time to the Melbourne city centre was reduced from several hours by horse-drawn carriage to 90 minutes by steam train, making it a popular seaside destination for excursionists and weekend holidaymakers from the mid-1880s.

Mark Young constructed enclosed sea baths in 1883, on a bed of granite located roughly 100 metres off the coastline of Frankston Beach, at a cost of £950. They were connected to the coastline by a wooden pathway that led to a suspension bridge over Kananook Creek to Young's Pier Hotel.

During this time, an article in The Argus newspaper on the growth of outer Melbourne (published 4 October 1884) describes Frankston as "going ahead rapidly" with "50 to 60 new houses...[in] the last three years" as well as having "two hotels, a wine shop, four boarding-houses, three general stores, an ironmonger, two saddlers' shops [and] five brick-yards". Frankston's Market Gardeners' and Fruit Growers' Association was founded around this time, in order to transport the produce of local farmers by steam ship to New South Wales and Tasmania, and the majority of trade for the Mornington Peninsula and Phillip Island, as well as south-west Gippsland, is also described as passing through Frankston.

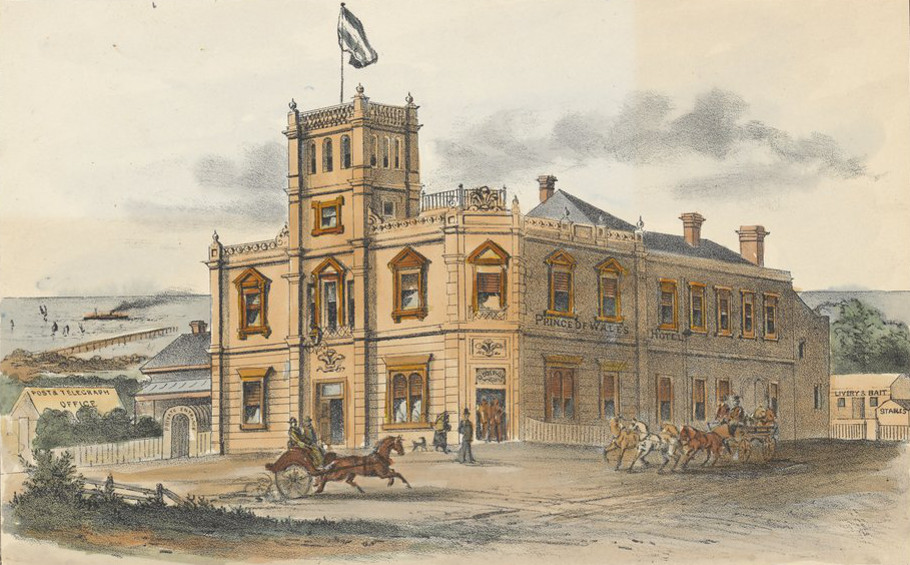
The Prince of Wales Hotel and the Frankston Post & Telegraph Office beside it in 1890.

On 8 December 1884, John Storey Petrie was granted the license to establish a third hotel in Frankston, the Prince of Wales Hotel, on what is now the southwest corner of Davey Street and Nepean Highway (the present site of Davey's Bar and Restaurant) in the Frankston Central Business District (CBD). It was designed in the Victorian Queen Anne style and was constructed of bluestone and locally made bricks.

The intersection of Davey Street and Nepean Highway with Young's Pier Hotel (northwest corner), Davey's Bay View Hotel (northeast corner) and Petrie's Prince of Wales Hotel (southwest corner), became known as a "hotel corner" from the 1890s, and contemporarily as "pub corner". Around 100 years later, in the mid-1990s, they were joined by a nightclub on its southeast corner.

Frankston Brick Company was founded in 1886, by a consortium of local businessmen including William Davey Jr. and Thomas Ritchie—most likely in order to capitalise on the Melbourne land boom during the mid-1880s—and was later publicly floated. It was the first large-scale employer in Frankston, consolidating the existing local brick-yards onto a single site close to Frankston Pier, and producing approximately 50,000 bricks a week.

The Victorian colonial government established a large military camp in what is now the City of Frankston suburb of Langwarrin in 1886, which aided in the growth of the Frankston area. The entrance to the Langwarrin Military Camp was located on the corner of McClelland Drive and Robinsons Road, and it is now the Langwarrin Flora and Fauna Reserve.

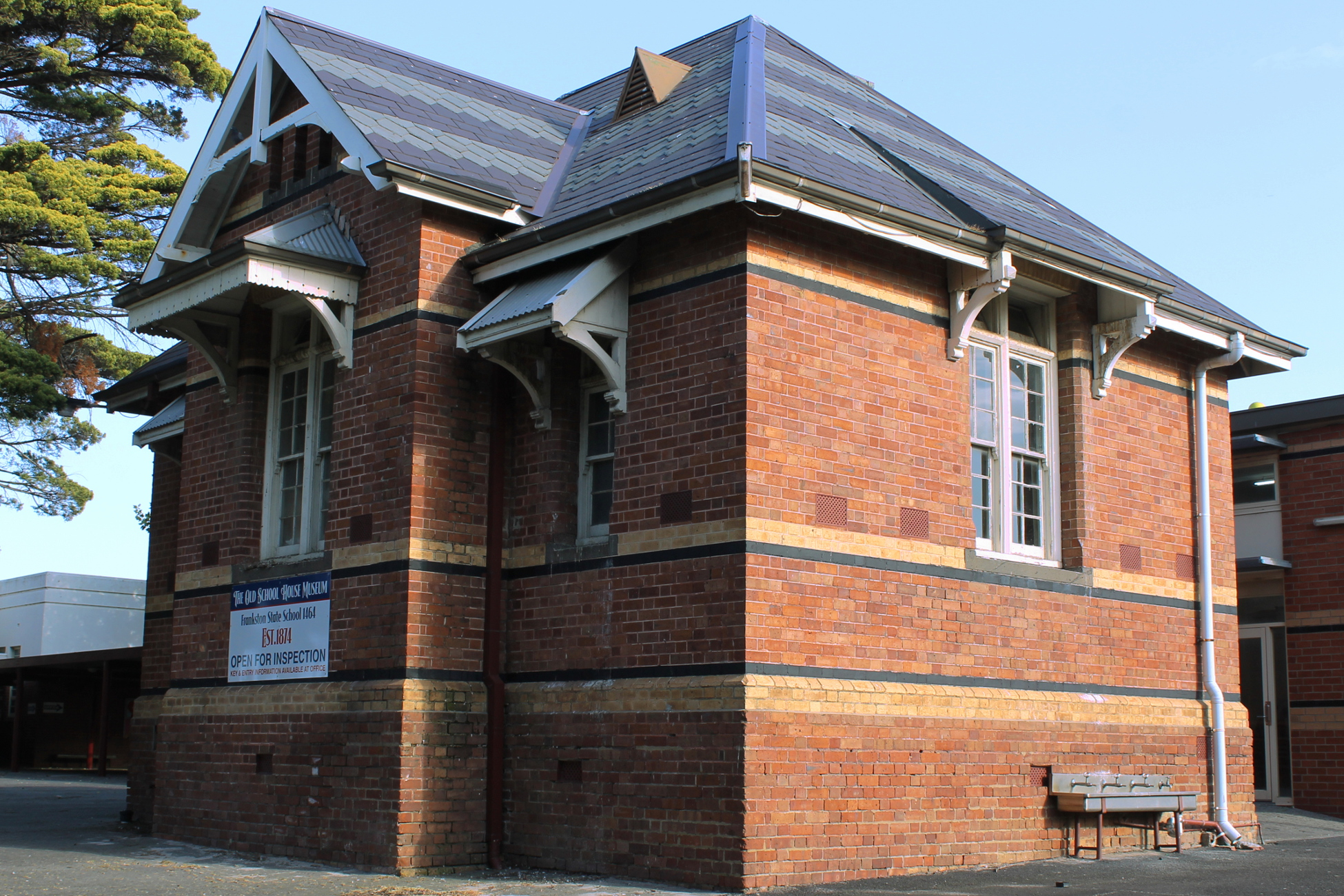
Frankston's Old School House was built in 1889 and is now operated as an education history museum.

By the mid-1880s, No. 1464 Frankston School was classified as a "class 4" school (approximately 250 pupils) and had previously been expanded with an extension to the existing wooden school house in 1880. Due to its growing enrolments, and following a petition by residents to the Victorian colonial Department of Education, an additional 20 x 30 feet brick school house was built in 1889. The brick school house is now operated as an education history museum by the Frankston Historical Society.

A new Anglican church building was opened on 5 February 1887. It was designed in a Victorian Gothic Revival style by the ecclesiastic architect Louis Williams and built at a cost of £474. The St. Paul's Church of England was formally licensed as a place of worship on 21 February 1888, and the Frankston Parish of St. Paul was officially established on 7 February 1889.

The first Roman Catholic church, St. Francis Xavier's, was officially opened by Archbishop Thomas Carr on 15 December 1889. Its initial site on Davey Street in the Frankston CBD cost £60. It was designed in a Victorian Free Gothic style by architectural firm Tappin, Gilbert and Denchy and was constructed of locally made bricks. It was originally administered by the Dandenong Parish of St. Mary and later the Mornington Parish of St. Macartan.

On 20 October 1893, the broader Frankston area along with the eastern Mornington Peninsula riding of the old Shire of Mornington was incorporated as the Shire of Frankston and Hastings local government area, with the eastern Mornington Peninsula riding becoming the new Shire of Mornington. Early council meetings of the new shire were held at the Frankston Mechanics' Institute and the inaugural shire president was Cr. Edward McGurk.

=== 20th century ===
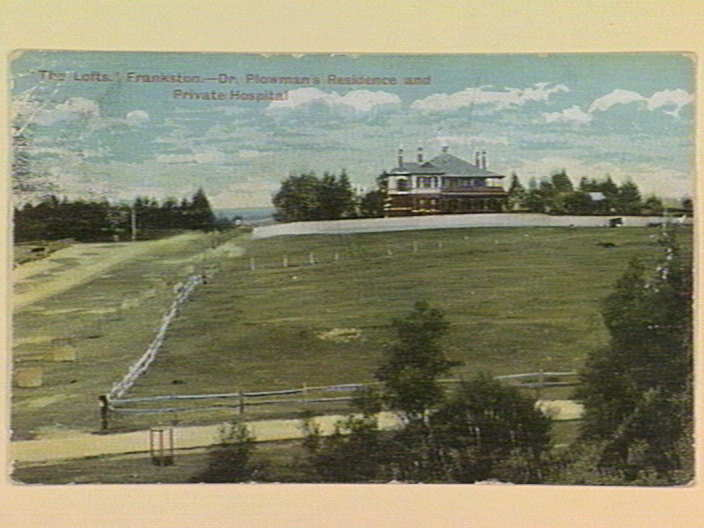
Dr Sidney Plowman's residence, The Lofts, on Davey Street, was Frankston's first hospital in 1900.

The first hospital in Frankston opened at the turn of the 20th century, as the private day surgery and hospital of the British doctor and former Director of the Melbourne Pharmacy School Sidney Plowman. It operated from Dr Plowman's residence, known as The Lofts (also known as the Plowman Residence), at 20 Davey Street in the Frankston Central Business District (CBD), until his death in 1937. The Lofts was designed as a Queen Anne style California bungalow by Blackett & Rankin Architects and constructed of locally made bricks. It is listed is on the Victorian and Australian heritage registries through the National Trust of Australia, and was restored and incorporated into the design of Frankston's Australian Government Building, which was built around it in the 1990s. It currently houses the Frankston offices of the Australian Electoral Commission and the member of parliament in the Australian House of Representatives for the Division of Dunkley (of which Frankston is a part).

From 1909 the former proposed metropolitan cemetery site near Frankston was repurposed as a pine forest plantation by the Victorian state Forestry Commission. When most of the plantation was destroyed by a fire on 2 January 1955, the state Housing Commission established the Pine Forest housing estate (locally called "The Pines") in 1958, and is now the City of Frankston suburb of Frankston North.

The new Commonwealth Postal Service (now Australia Post) opened its first office in Frankston on the southeast corner of Davey Street and Main Street (now Nepean Highway) on 12 September 1910. It was designed in an Edwardian style by the Victorian state Department of Public Works and constructed of brick. It was later remodelled with the addition of a telephone exchange in 1927, and expanded again in 1941. It ceased operation as a post office and telephone exchange in the mid-1980s, after which it was operated as a restaurant. Since the mid-1990s it has been operated as a nightclub. In 2013, its exterior was partly restored to its 1941 design.

==== War-time ====
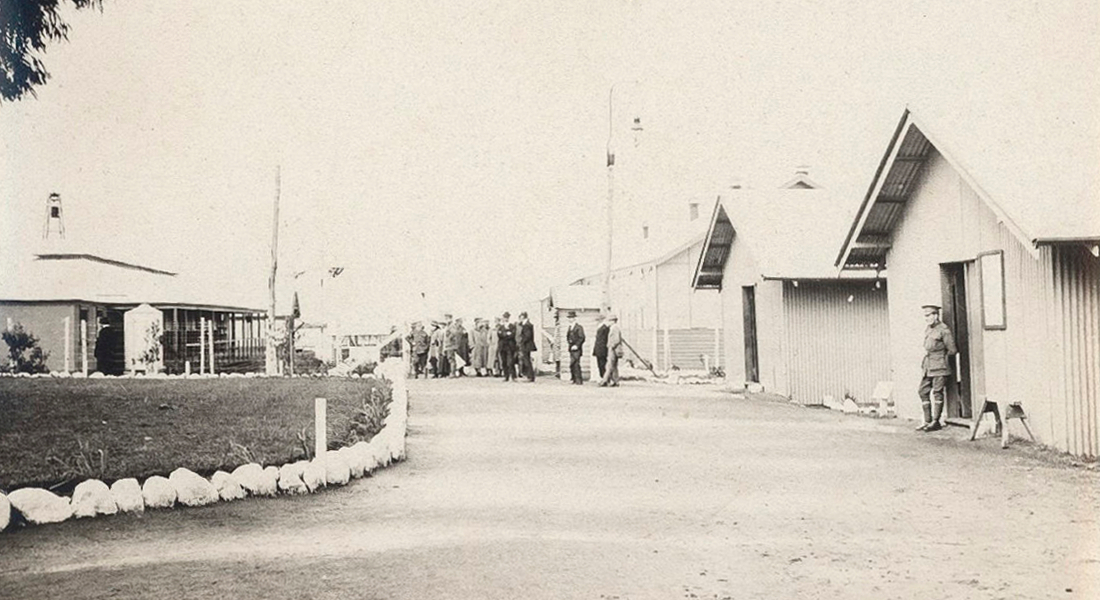
Langwarrin Military Camp in 1914, where German prisoners were held during World War I.

Following the declaration of war on the German Empire by the British Empire, on 8 August 1914 (GMT), the first soldier to enlist from Frankston was Sergeant William Polglase on the same day (AEST). Of the soldiers from Frankston that were killed in action in World War I, 16 are listed on the Roll of Honour at the Australian War Memorial.

At the beginning of World War I the Langwarrin Military Camp near Frankston was used to detain around 500 German prisoners of war. A military hospital was later established at the camp in order to treat Australian soldiers returning with venereal disease from Egypt and France. Most of the prisoners of war were later transferred to Holsworthy Barracks in Sydney in 1915, however, some also stayed to work at the hospital and settled in Frankston upon their release. Between 1915 and 1916 research at the hospital halved the duration of venereal disease treatment and its cost. It also advanced the burgeoning field of occupational therapy in Australia by involving its patients in gardening and music. It became a state-of-the-art rehabilitation hospital, during this time—and also had pet animals, landscaped gardens and shrubbery, art and musical equipment as well as a band for its patients. The hospital closed in 1919, with the base eventually following in the 1970s. It is now the Langwarrin Flora and Fauna Reserve. The ruins of the hospital's fountain can still be found in the reserve.

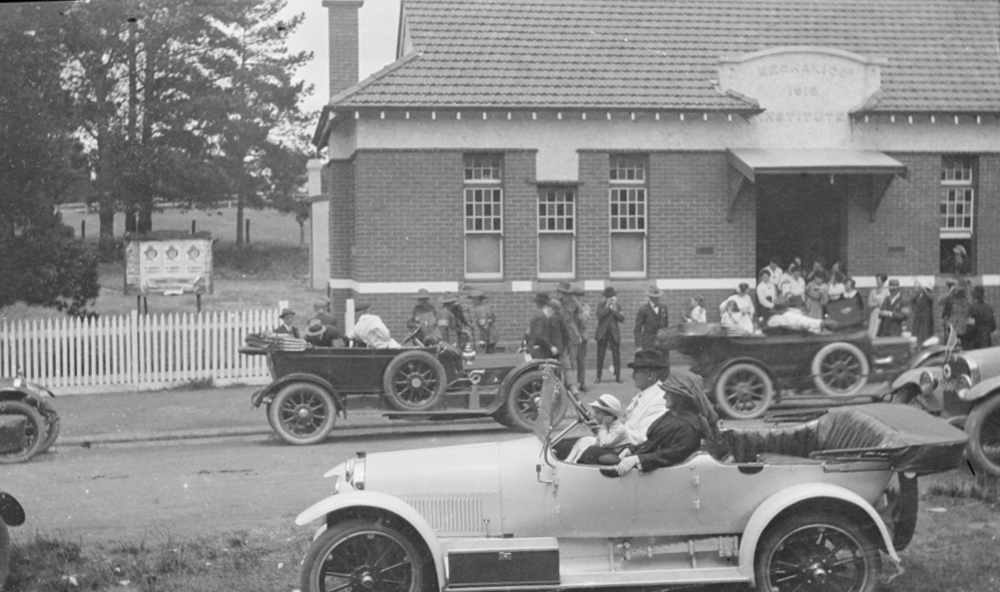
The Volunteer Motor Corp. in front of the Frankston Mechanics' Institute during World War I.

The Frankston Mechanics' Institute was expanded in 1915, with a 22 x 50 feet brick addition to its street frontage, at a cost of £529. The 1915 brick addition is now the oldest extant part of the building after the 1881 hall section had to be rebuilt in 1956 due to fire safety concerns. It became the eighth building to receive a blue plaque from the Mechanics' Institute of Victoria in 2004. In 2009, Frankston City Council undertook a A$2.5 million restoration of the building to its 1915 design.

On 17 February 1916, following a poll of residents, the Frankston Gas Company was granted permission by the shire's council to establish "electric light and power" across the Shire of Frankston and Hastings.

Frankston's reputation as a holiday destination increased particularly after the electrification of the railway line on 27 August 1922, which reduced the average travel time from 90 to 62 minutes. During this time, the broader Frankston area developed into a playground for Melbourne's affluent and a regional capital for the greater Mornington Peninsula region. In part due to an increase in visitors during this time, the Frankston Life Saving Club was established on Frankston Beach in 1924.

On 2 February 1923, the Rt. Hon. Stanley Bruce, the member of the Parliament of Australia representing the Division of Flinders (of which Frankston was a part at the time) and the Treasurer of Australia, who lived at Pinehill (also known as Bruce Manor) in Frankston, was elected the eighth Prime Minister of Australia following the resignation of the Rt. Hon. Billy Hughes. Pinehill was built in 1926 and designed in a Spanish Mission style by architectural firm Prevost, Synnot & Rewald with Robert Bell Hamilton. It is listed on the Victorian and Australian heritage registries through the National Trust of Australia.

The Roman Catholic Parish of St. Francis Xavier in Frankston was officially established on 4 November 1926. The old church was doubled in its size and a pipe organ built by George Fincham & Sons was installed in 1927. A school was also established the following year (which later became St. Francis Xavier Primary School).

St. Paul's Church of England was substantially enlarged in 1933, at an estimated cost of £3500. New north and south transepts, a chancel, sanctuary, vestries, and a chapel of St. Richard, were all added in a sympathetic Gothic Revival style by its original architect Louis Williams. The design incorporated the 1887 nave of the church, and also planned for a tower at its western end. Its foundation stone was laid by Archbishop Frederick Head.

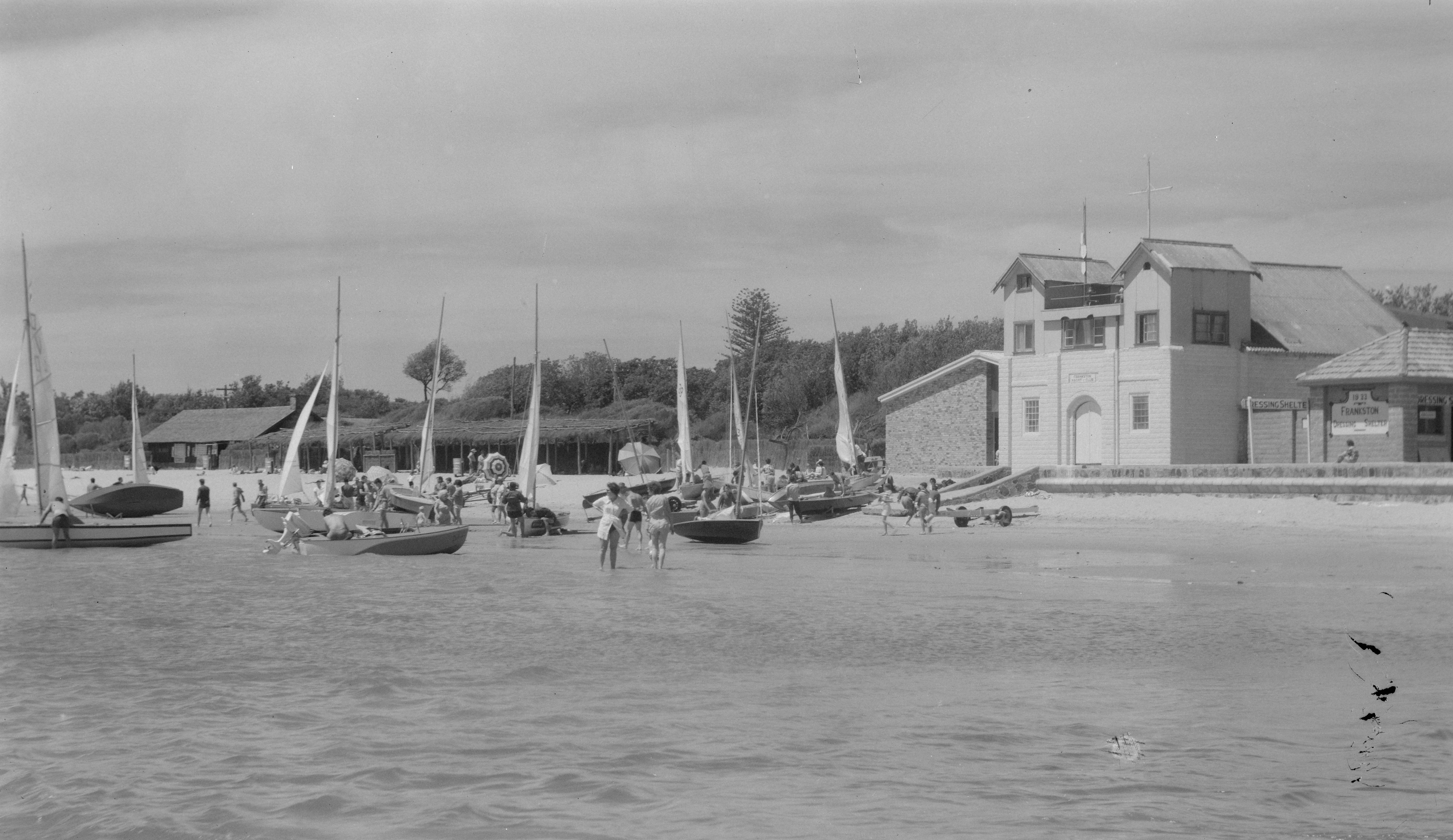
The former Frankston Yacht Club house in the 1940s.

In 1935, the Frankston area was chosen to host the first Australian Scout Jamboree. It was the only Australia jamboree attended by the founder of the Scouting movement Sir Robert Baden-Powell. A number of streets in the Frankston area are named after the jamboree. The original jamboree grandstand remained at Frankston Park for over 70 years until it was destroyed by a fire on 12 February 2008 (a replica of the old grandstand was later built on its site in 2010). Following the jamboree, the Frankston Yacht Club was officially established in 1937.

The first public hospital in Frankston, the Frankston Community Hospital, was established at 2 Hastings Road in 1941. Now named Frankston Hospital, it is the largest of four hospitals in the suburb and is also the chief provider of acute secondary and tertiary care in the broader City of Frankston area and the greater Mornington Peninsula region.

During World War II, the Commander of the First Australian Army in the Pacific theatre (from 1940 to 1945) and the Commander-in-Chief of Australian Military Forces in occupied Japan (from 1945 to 1950) was the Frankston-born Lieutenant General Sir Vernon Sturdee.

In 1946, J. R.W. "Bill" Pratt established his first grocery store in Frankston that would later become one of the largest supermarket chains in Australia as a subsidiary of American-owned Safeway Inc. Pratt was studying engineering at RMIT when he took a summer job at a grocery store in Frankston in 1945. He eventually bought the store the following year, renaming it Pratt's Stores, and developed it into one of the first supermarkets in Australia in the 1950s. He also expanded to two more supermarkets in nearby Mornington and Chelsea during this time. It was the opening of his Chelsea supermarket that caught the attention of representatives from Safeway, who were in Australia sourcing apples, as it was officially opened by media personality (and Frankston resident) Graham Kennedy. Safeway entered Australia by merging with Pratt's Stores in 1962. As managing director of Safeway's Australian subsidiary, Pratt grew the chain to 126 supermarkets across eastern Australia by 1985. It was then bought by the Australian-owned Woolworths in 1985, who retained the successful Safeway brand in Victoria for 23 years, before rebranding all its stores as Woolworths in 2008.

==== Post-war ====
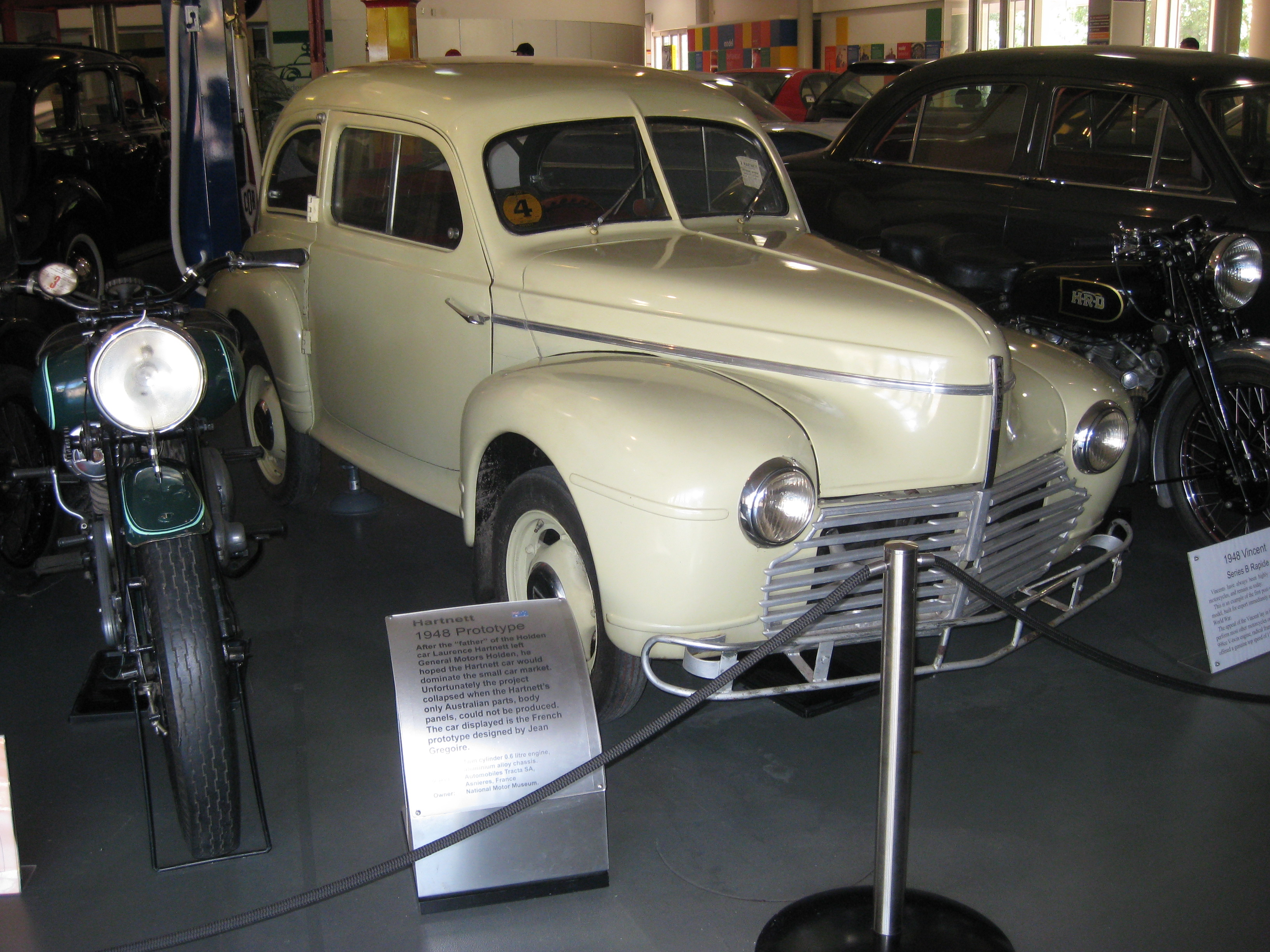
The prototype of the Hartnett car that was manufactured in Frankston.

The population of the broader Frankston area boomed during and after World War II increasing from 12,000 in 1947 to 82,000 by 1982 (according to the former 1893 Shire of Frankston and Hastings borders). This was in part due to the establishment of government housing estates in the area to house the families of Australian Military Force personnel stationed at the Langwarrin Military Camp in the City of Frankston suburb of Langwarrin as well as at the Balcombe Army School in Mount Martha and the Flinders Naval Depot near Hastings. The plastics manufacturer Nylex also established its operations in Frankston in 1947, and became one of the largest employers in the area for 50 years, until its operations were downgraded in the mid-2000s.

During the early 1950s, Frankston was briefly home to the Hartnett Motor Company. Following his resignation as managing director of General Motors-Holden (GMH) in 1948, Laurence Hartnett was approached by then Prime Minister of Australia the Rt. Hon. Ben Chifley to establish an Australian-owned car company to compete with American-owned GMH in Australia. At GMH, Hartnett was "the father of the Holden"—the first Australian-made car. 70 acres between Seaford and Frankston was selected for the site of the factory with the support of the Victorian state government in 1949. The Hartnett Tasman was a front-wheel drive two door sedan based on a design by Jean Grégoire. The company planned to produce 100 cars a month at its Frankston factory. However, due to the delayed delivery of parts from the Australian Government's Commonwealth Engineering Company, production was also severely delayed. The first Hartnett Tasman was dispatched from the factory in March 1952. 125 Tasmans and its convertible version, the Hartnett Pacific, were dispatched before the company went into receivership due to its delays in September 1952. The rare Frankston-made cars are now collector's items.

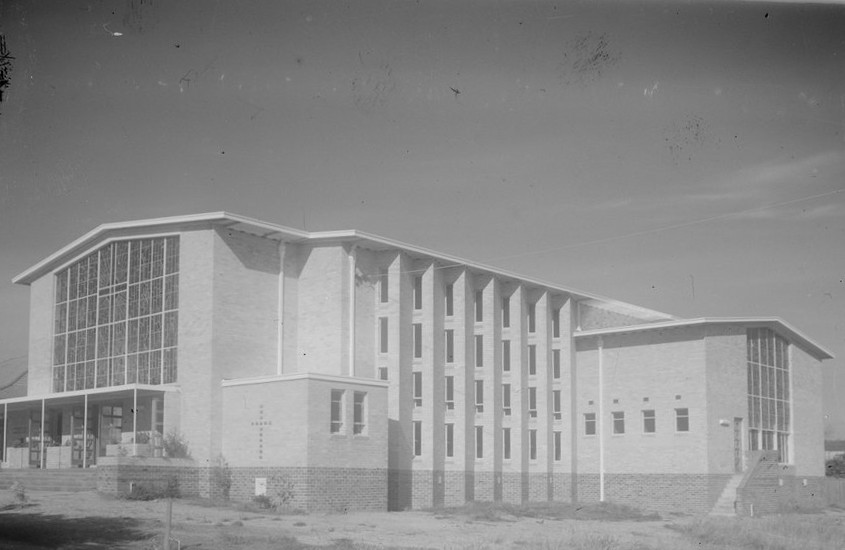
The main stained glass window of St Francis Xavier's Catholic Church was reputed to be the largest in the Southern Hemisphere in 1954.

On 7 October 1954, a new 600-seat St. Francis Xavier's Roman Catholic Church was officially opened by Archbishop Daniel Mannix. It was designed in a Post-War Modern style by architect Alan G Robertson and was constructed of smooth-faced brick. Its Modernist style was designed to emphasise its two stained glass windows created by artist Alan Sumner. The main north window was reputed to be the largest in the Southern Hemisphere at the time of its installation. The 1927 George Fincham & Sons pipe organ was refurbished in 1977. The old church was used as classrooms for St. Francis Xavier's school until it was demolished in the 1970s.

On 26 October 1957, St. Paul's Church of England was extensively damaged by fire, leaving only its sanctuary intact. Designs for the re-building of the damaged sections of the church was again completed by its original architect Louis Williams. However, he decided to use a more restrained Gothic Arts and Crafts style for the rebuild. The transepts, chancel, sanctuary, vestries and chapel from the 1933 design were retained, but the 1887 nave was beyond repair and was demolished. The new designs included a nave with multiple gabled bay windows with stained glass designed by mural artist Christian Waller (wife of Napier Waller) and a restrained version of the tower from the 1933 design. The foundation stone for the rebuilt church was again laid by Archbishop Frederick Head, and it was constructed of clinker brick in 1959.

Gregory Peck in front of the former Frankston railway station building in the film On the Beach (1959).

In the summer of 1959, On the Beach, one of the first major Hollywood films to be made in Australia, was partly filmed in Frankston. The film was adapted from the best-selling novel of the same name, by popular author Nevil Shute (who lived in the City of Frankston suburb of Langwarrin). The name "Falmouth" is used to describe Frankston in the novel, but its actual name is used in the film. Scenes with lead actors Gregory Peck and Ava Gardner were filmed at Frankston railway station and on Young Street in the Frankston CBD, and at Frankston Beach with main supporting actors Fred Astaire (in his first dramatic film role), Anthony Perkins, and Donna Anderson. Famously, when asked to "give us a few steps" by an onlooker at Frankston railway station, the off-duty Fred Astaire danced across the length of the forecourt up to the station ramp.

On 19 October 1960, the eastern riding of the old Shire of Frankston and Hastings was incorporated as the Shire of Hastings, with the central riding becoming the Shire of Frankston. The shire was proclaimed a city on 24 August 1966, and incorporated as the City of Frankston.

The Frankston flotilla of the Volunteer Coast Guard was established in 1961, as one of the eight founding flotillas in Victoria.

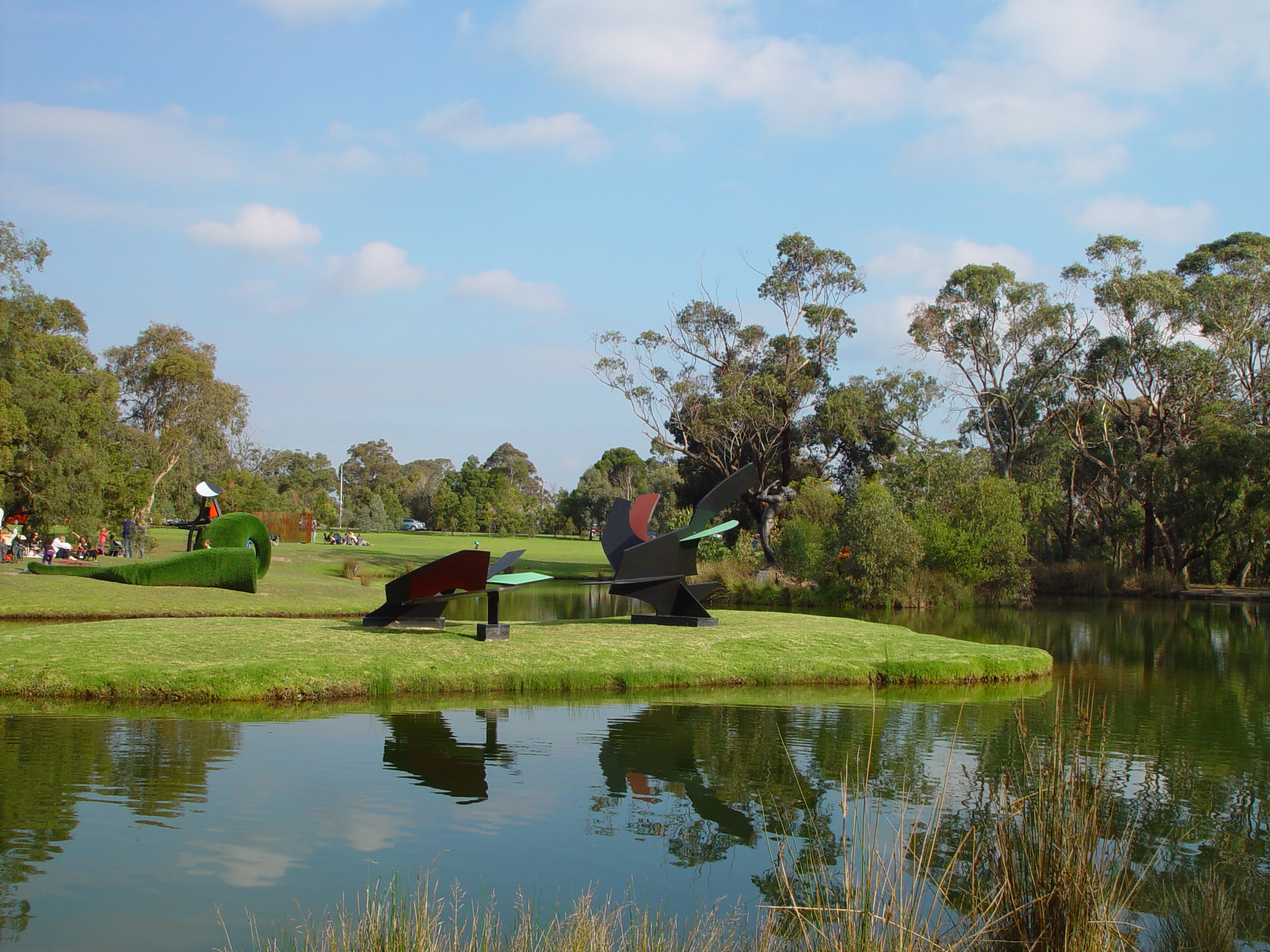
McClelland Gallery and Sculpture Park was opened in 1971.

In 1969, poet Annie May (Nan) McClelland bequeathed the land known as Studio Park in the City of Frankston suburb of Langwarrin to establish the Harry McClelland Art Gallery and Cultural Hall in honour of her artist brother Harry McClelland. The McClelland siblings were at the centre of a bohemian artists group based in the Frankston locality of Long Island during the 1920s, which included artists and writers such as Sir Daryl and Lady Joan Lindsay, Percy Leason and William Beckwith McInnes. Located at what is now 390 McClelland Drive. on the border of Frankston and Langwarrin, it opened in 1971. During its first 40 years of operation its governor was philanthropist Dame Elisabeth Murdoch. To support the acquisition of new works, the Elisabeth Murdoch Sculpture Foundation was established in 1989. Now named the McClelland Gallery and Sculpture Park, it is the leading sculpture park in Australia, and has over 130,000 visitors annually.

In 1986, the Australian film Frog Dreaming (which was retitled as The Go-Kids in the UK and The Quest in the US) was filmed in Frankston and at nearby Moorooduc Quarry in Mount Eliza (which was in the former 1966 City of Frankston borders at the time).

The borders of the City of Frankston were redrawn in 1994, excising its southern suburbs of Baxter and Mount Eliza to the new Shire of Mornington Peninsula, and gaining the north-eastern suburbs of Carrum Downs and Skye from the City of Casey and the former City of Springvale. The proposed name of the new city was initially "City of Nepean", but the historic name of Frankston (which had been used for its local government areas for over 100 years) was ultimately kept.

Following nearly a decade of campaigning by residents, in 1995, Frankston City Council opened a A$18.5 million arts centre. Originally named the Frankston Cultural Centre, it houses an 800-seat theatre with the second largest proscenium arched stage in Victoria. It also houses the Frankston Library, exhibition spaces, and a 500-seat function hall. Designed by architect Daryl Jackson, and located on the corner of Davey Street and Young Street in the Frankston CBD, it was opened on 20 May by then Prime Minister of Australia the Hon. Paul Keating. A flexible 194-seat theatre named Cube37 with studios and a wet workshop was also built adjoining the northeast corner of the centre in 2001, and was opened on 30 March by then Prime Minister of Australia the Hon. John Howard. Now named the Frankston Arts Centre, it serves over 250,000 patrons annually.

=== 21st century ===
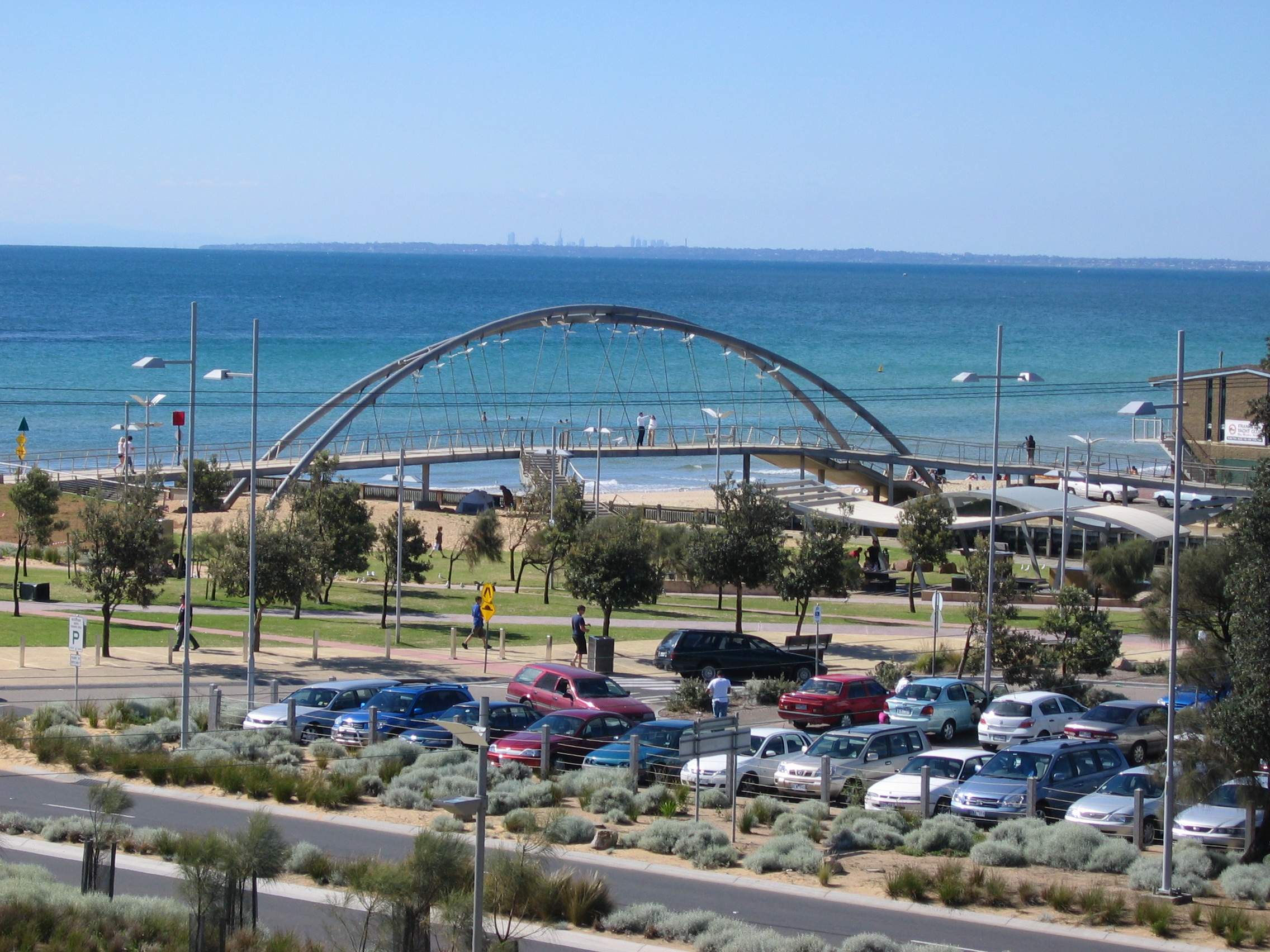
The pedestrian suspension bridge at the Frankston Waterfront, which is lit in a variety of colours at night.

At the turn of the 3rd millennium, Frankston City Council prepared a comprehensive scheme to develop key zones on the Frankston foreshore. The scheme was delivered in stages and included: a new waterfront area with public amenities and a visitor centre; a raised timber foreshoreway and a pedestrian bridge over the mouth of Kananook Creek; and new life saving and yacht club houses—and were primarily constructed over existing sites and car parking areas.

The first stage of the scheme, named the Frankston Waterfront, was undertaken in the mid-2000s, and included: landscaping with public art (around Frankston Pier north to the mouth of Kananook Creek); erection of the pedestrian bridge over the mouth of Kananook Creek (next to the existing Frankston Yacht Club house); construction of the café, restaurant and visitor centre building (next to Frankston Pier); installation of a large playground (between the new visitor centre and existing Frankston Volunteer Coast Guard flotilla); as well as the southern stretch of the foreshoreway, named the Frankston Boardwalk (from Frankston Pier to near the base of Olivers Hill).

The A$1 million Frankston Visitor Information Centre at the Frankston Waterfront opened in 2007. The centre has since won the Victorian Tourism Award and Australian Tourism Award for its "visitor information services" in 2012, 2013 and 2014. It was also inducted into the Victorian and Australian Tourism Hall of Fame in 2014 (after which it is no longer eligible for awards).

In 2007, Sand Sculpting Australia made the Frankston Waterfront the home of its annual sand festival. Held over four months from 26 December, it is the largest exhibition of sand art in Australia and one of the largest in the Southern Hemisphere—with approximately 3,500 tonnes of sand used during the 2014 festival.

The second stage of the foreshore development scheme was undertaken in the late-2000s, and included: construction of the new Frankston Life Saving Club house (north of the Frankston Waterfront), and the northern stretch of the Frankston Boardwalk foreshoreway (between the new Frankston Life Saving Club and existing Frankston Yacht Club houses).

In 2010, scenes for the Hollywood film Killer Elite were shot in Frankston. Lead actor Jason Statham spent five days in July filming at a house on Olivers Hill with supporting actors Aden Young and Lachy Hulme. In the film, the house doubles as an Omani mansion overlooking the Arabian Sea.

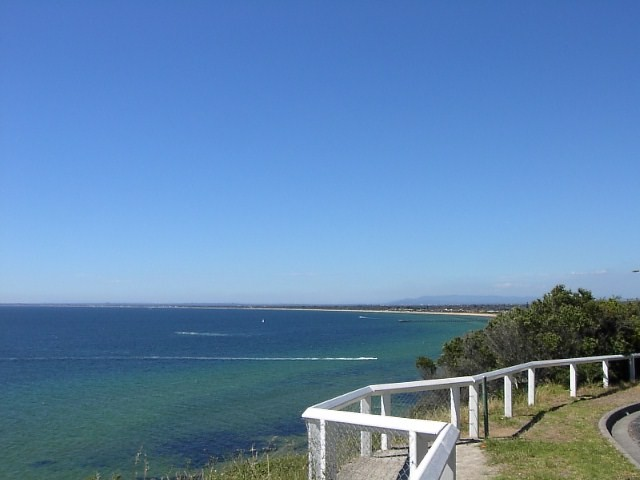
Olivers Hill Lookout

In 2012, the major water utility provider South East Water announced its intention to consolidate its business operations (700 staff spread across three office locations at the time) in a new A$70 million headquarters in Frankston. The site of the building on Kananook Creek Boulevard (along the eastern bank of Kananook Creek) in the Frankston Central Business District (CBD) cost A$4 million. The eight-storey 11,000 m^{2} building also includes around 550 m^{2} of café and retail space, that fronts a pedestrian promenade on Kananook Creek. It opened in 2015 and was designed by architectural firm BVN Donovan Hill.

In 2014, Frankston City Council opened a A$49.7 million health and aquatic recreation centre located on the corner of Cranbourne Road and Olive Grove near the Frankston CBD. Named the Peninsula Aquatic Recreation Centre (Frankston PARC), it has four swimming pools, including an Olympic-size pool (50 metres); an aquatic playground and two water slides (by WhiteWater West); a gym and a health and wellness centre as well as other related facilities. It was designed by architectural firm William Ross Architects.

The third and final stage of the foreshore development scheme saw the construction of a new A$7.5 million Frankston Yacht Club house, as well as beachfront promenade, and was completed in 2016 at a total cost of A$10.7 million. It was designed by architectural firm Taylor Cullity Lethlean.

== Geography and climate ==
The suburb is at the southernmost end of Beaumaris Bay on the eastern coastline of Port Phillip; a 22 km continuous stretch of beaches, broken only by Mordialloc Creek, the Patterson River, and Kananook Creek, beginning at sandstone cliffs in the Melbourne southeastern suburb of Beaumaris and ending at Olivers Hill in Frankston.

The suburb of Frankston covers a large geographic area compared with other Melbourne suburbs. It also envelopes a number of localities (with the postcode 3199), which are not independent suburbs, including: Frankston Central Business District (CBD), Frankston East, Frankston Heights, Karingal, Long Island, Mount Erin and Olivers Hill.

Frankston is bordered to the west by the Port Phillip coastline; to the north by property fronting Overton Road and Skye Road, as well as the Long Island and Peninsula Kingswood country clubs (bordering the City of Frankston suburbs of Frankston North and Seaford); to the east by the Mornington Peninsula Freeway/Peninsula Link (bordering the City of Frankston suburb of Langwarrin) and to the south by property fronting Robinsons Road, Golflinks Road, Towerhill Road, Overport Road, Jasper Terrace and Warringa Road, then continuing down from Olivers Hill toward the coastline (bordering the City of Frankston suburb of Frankston South).

=== Geography ===
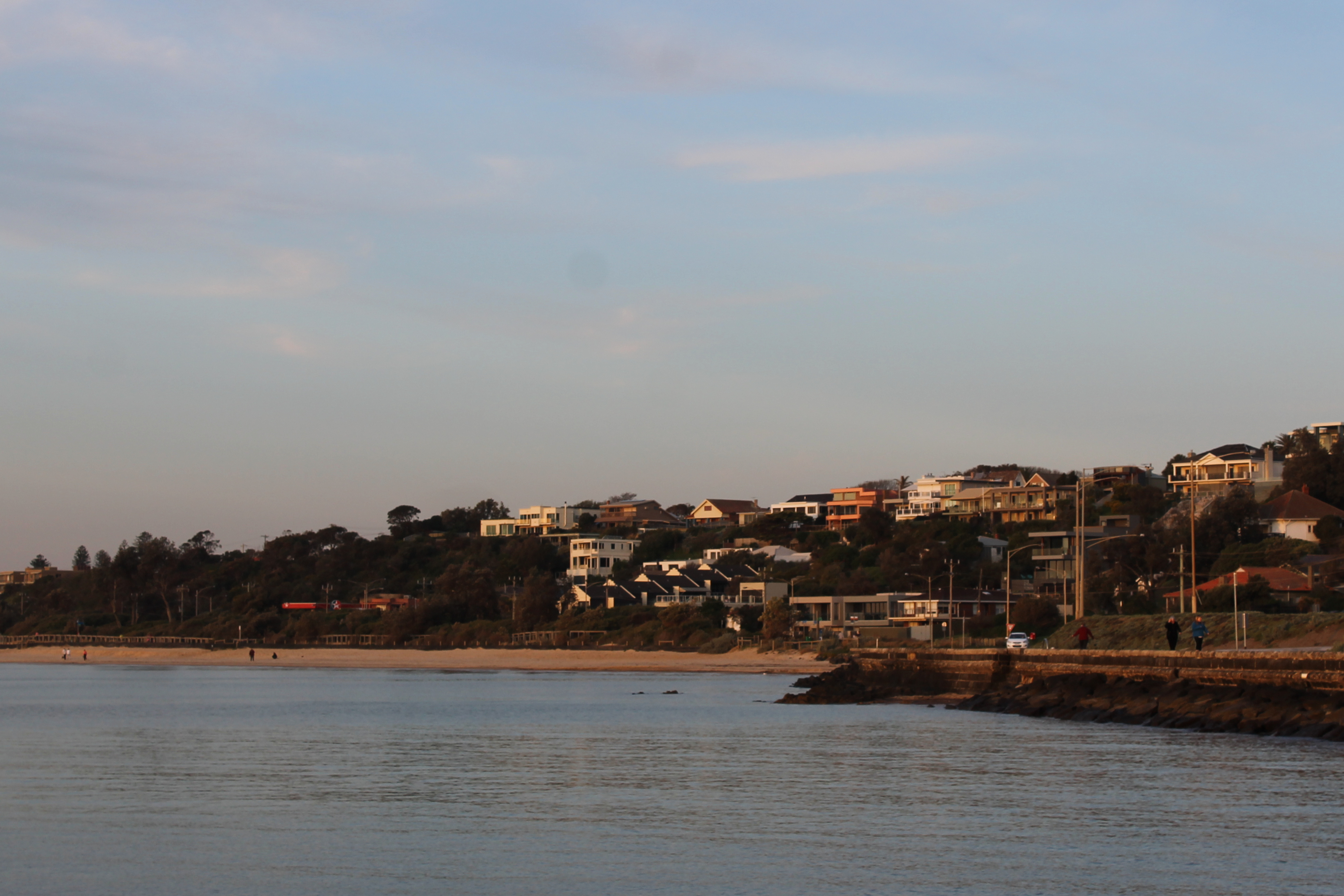
Properties along the cliffs and escarpments on Olivers Hil.

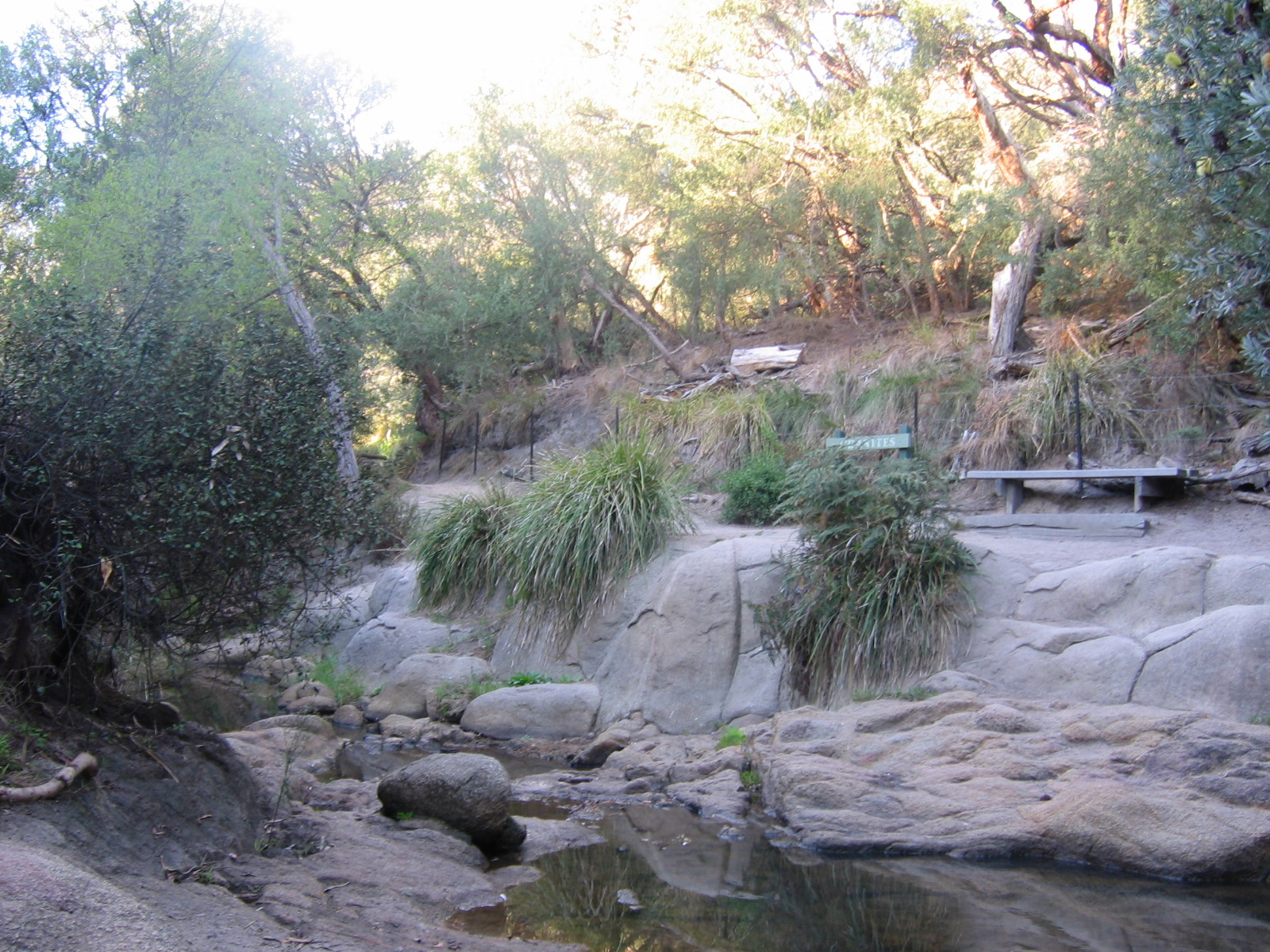
Granite rock formations in the Lower Sweetwater Creek Reserve.

The central and northern areas of Frankston are generally flat at around 10 to 12 metres above sea level (32 to 40 feet). The suburb then rises gradually towards its east, and sharply at Olivers Hill towards its south. The southern uplands of the suburb are at the northern end of an uplift area which is in a Horst-Graben structure that extends down the Mornington Peninsula. Similar plutonic intrusive uplifts occur again on the peninsula at Mount Martha and Arthurs Seat.

Two fault zones run under the southern uplands of Frankston and continue down the Mornington Peninsula. Named the Manyung Fault and the Selwyn Fault, they are mostly inactive. However, some minor earthquakes and tremors have historically been experienced.

Earthquakes with epicentres in or near the suburb of Frankston have occurred in 1932, 1978, 1980, 2009, 2014, and 2022. The most recent, on 17 September 2022, measured 2.4 on the Richter magnitude scale. The largest, on 22 September 2009, measured 3.0 on the Richter scale.

Olivers Hill is the most prominent elevation in Frankston which rises to 55 metres above sea level (180 feet) at its highest point in the suburb. Its origins date to approximately 415 to 360 million years ago. Its base is Mount Eliza Granite dating from the Devonian period, which was covered in lava tuffs in the Paleogene period. During the Miocene epoch in the Neogene period, the Frankston area was entirely flooded by the sea resulting in a mix of Balcombe Clay (at deep levels) and Baxter Sandstone (at shallow levels) covering the basaltic (lava) level. Fluctuating ice ages of the Pleistocene epoch in the current Quaternary period caused sea levels to rise and fall dramatically and for sedimentary rock and sand to be deposited on the surface of the hill. Aeolian processes in the current Holocene epoch, in which Port Phillip has periodically dried up (as recently as 1000 years ago), has caused further sand to be deposited.

With panoramic views across Port Phillip, Olivers Hill is home to the most expensive real estate in Frankston. It is considered to have one of the top ten residential views in Melbourne. Property in the locality has sold for between A$3 and A$4 million in 2015, at the same time as the median house price in the suburb of Frankston being A$390,000.

Due to fluvial processes on its levels of clay and sand and with ongoing property development, landslips on Olivers Hill are historically common. The first recorded landslip was in 1854 with at least one occurring again every decade up to the present day. A landslip once occurred in the 1960s during a live radio show hosted by media personality Graham Kennedy from his house on Olivers Hill, where he and his co-host Mike Walsh described how his driveway was "slipping down the slope", as they spoke on air. The most recent serious landslips occurred in 2007, 2012 and 2015. In all three of the occurrences, the fallen debris has blocked lanes on Nepean Highway.

==== Coastline ====
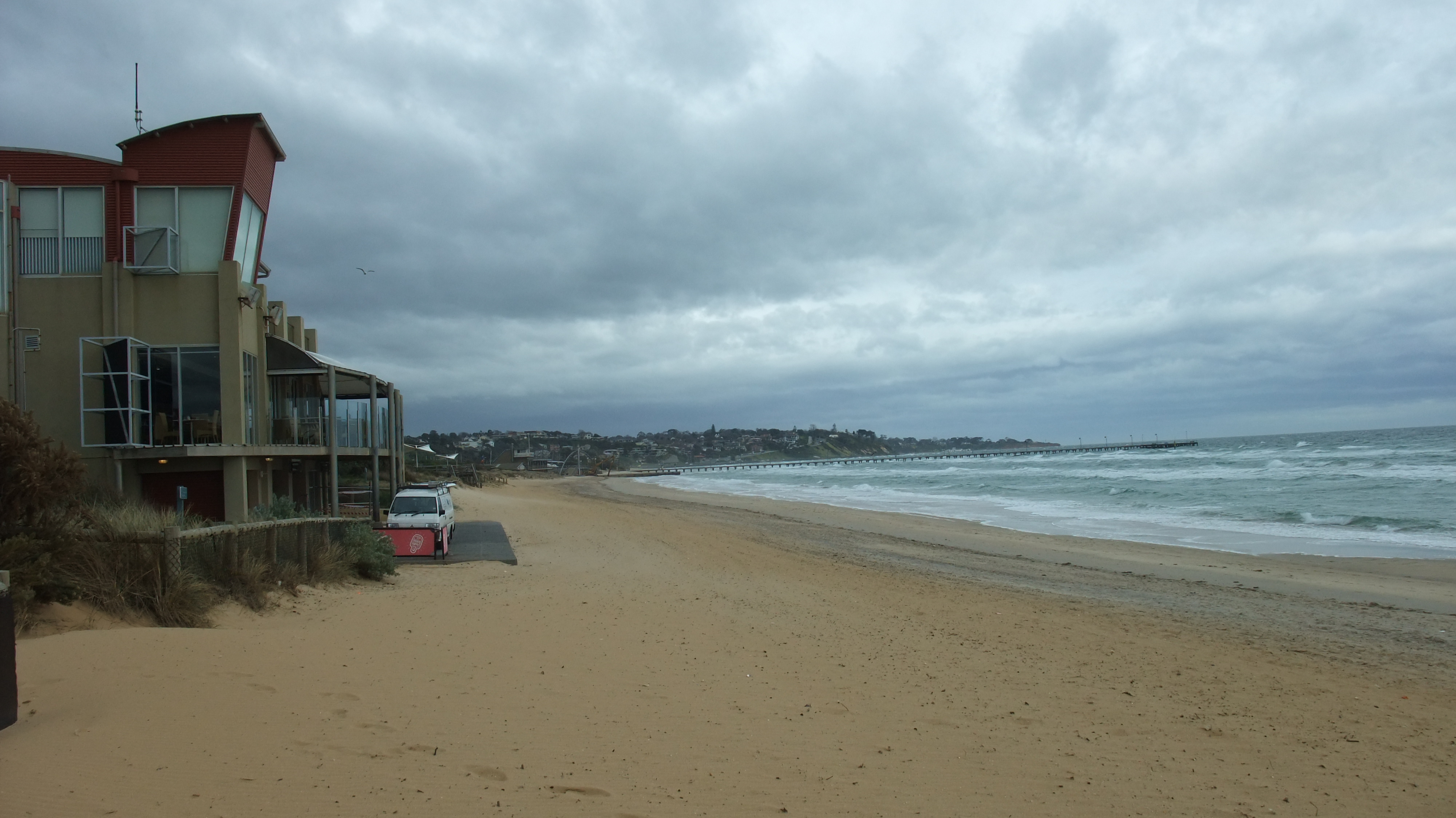
Storm over Frankston Beach near the Frankston Life Saving Club.

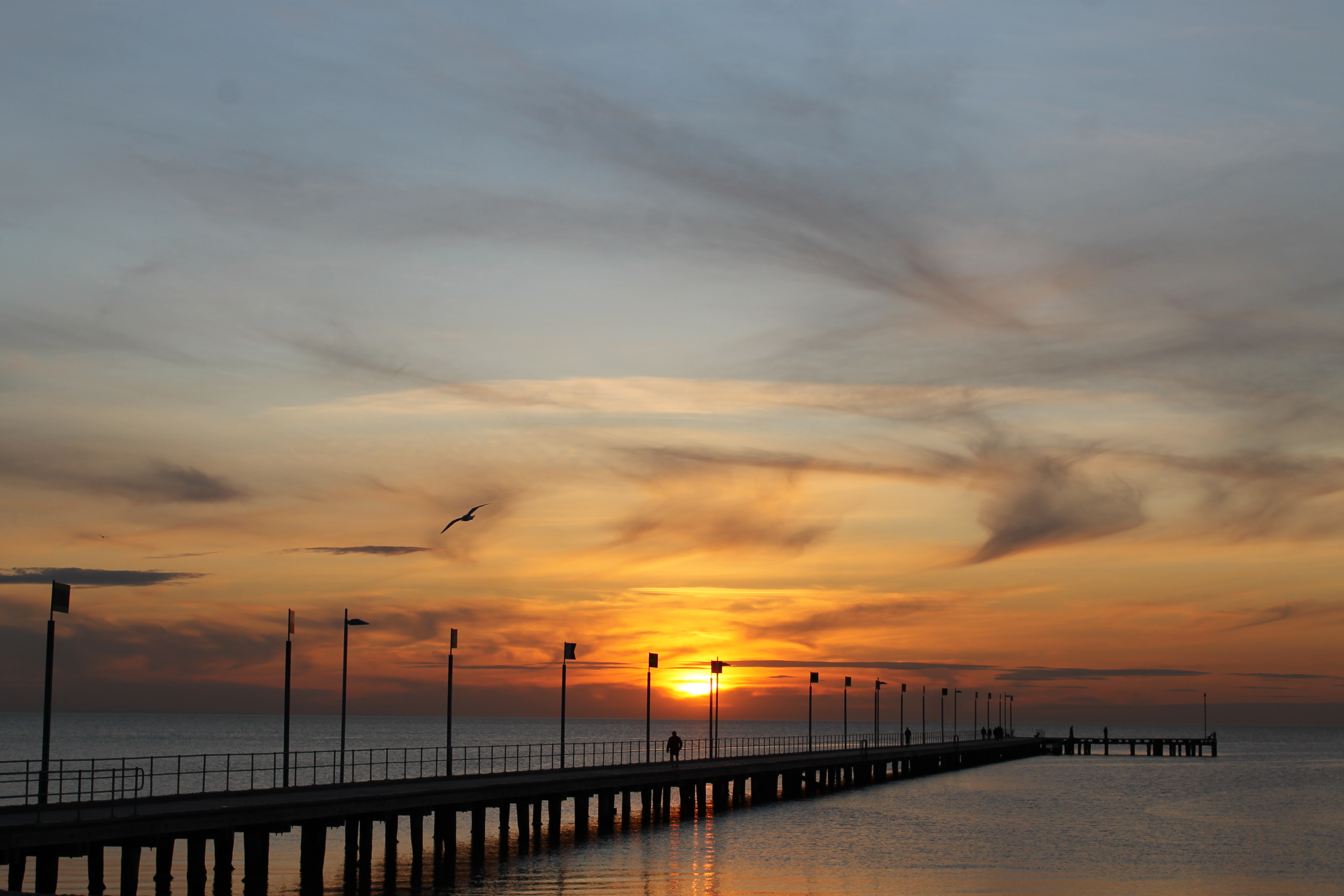
Frankston Pier at sunset.

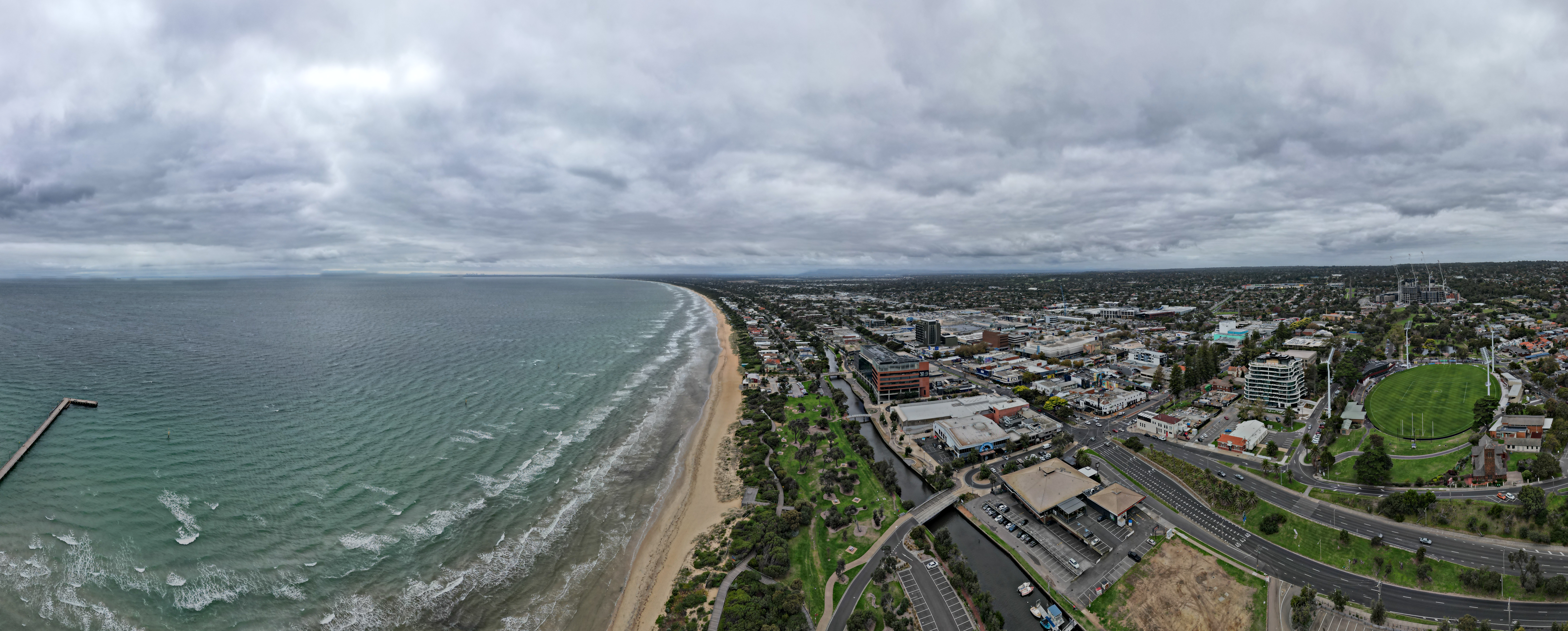
Frankston coastline facing north towards Melbourne.

The suburb is at the southernmost end of Beaumaris Bay on the eastern coastline of Port Phillip; a 22 km continuous stretch of beaches, broken only by Mordialloc Creek, the Patterson River and Kananook Creek, beginning at sandstone cliffs in the Melbourne southeastern suburb of Beaumaris and ending at Olivers Hill in Frankston.

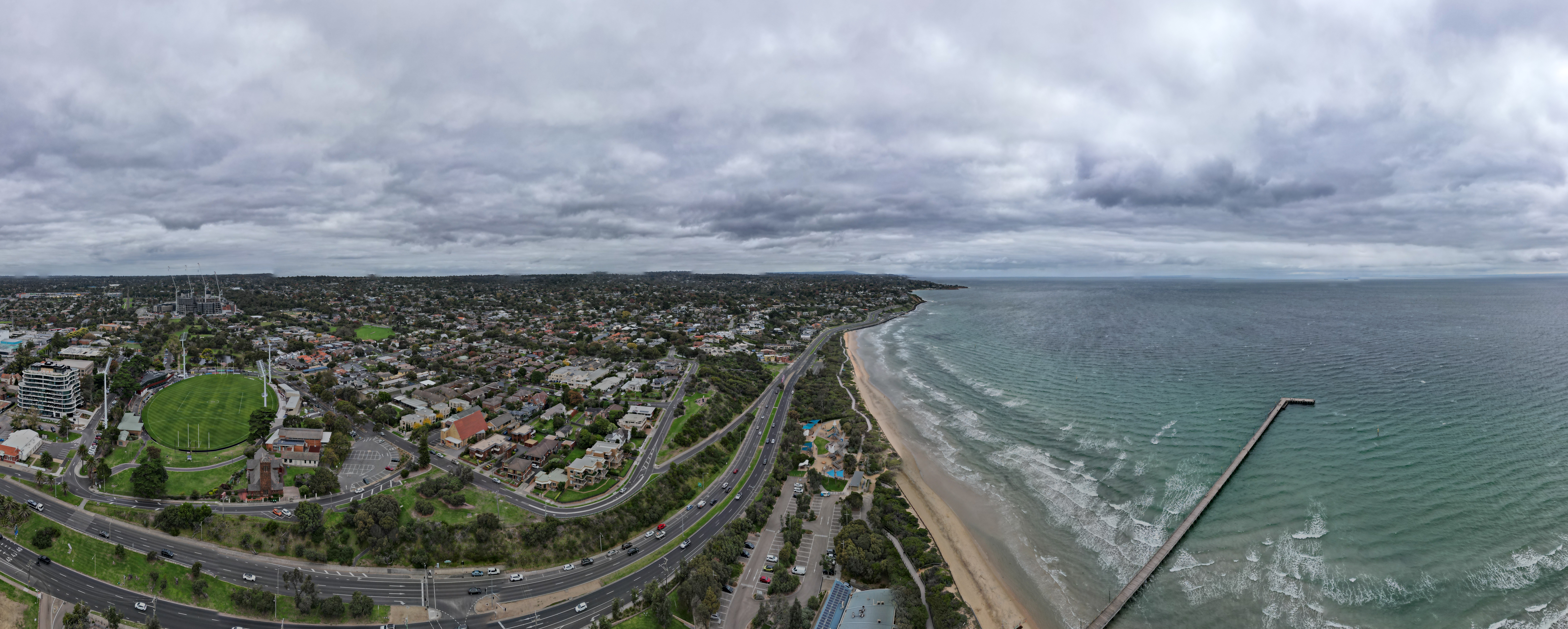
Frankston coastline facing south towards Point Nepean.

Frankston Beach is continually rated as one of the cleanest in Australia. It won the Keep Australia Beautiful Victorian Clean Beaches Award in 2008, 2011 and 2012 (the final year of the award), and also represented Victoria for the Australian Clean Beach Award in those years. On days of storm with gale-force westerly winds Frankston becomes one of the few areas of Port Phillip with wave swell of a size that allows for surfing—usually around two metres. As a result, Frankston Beach is one of the most popular among both locals and visitors in Victoria.

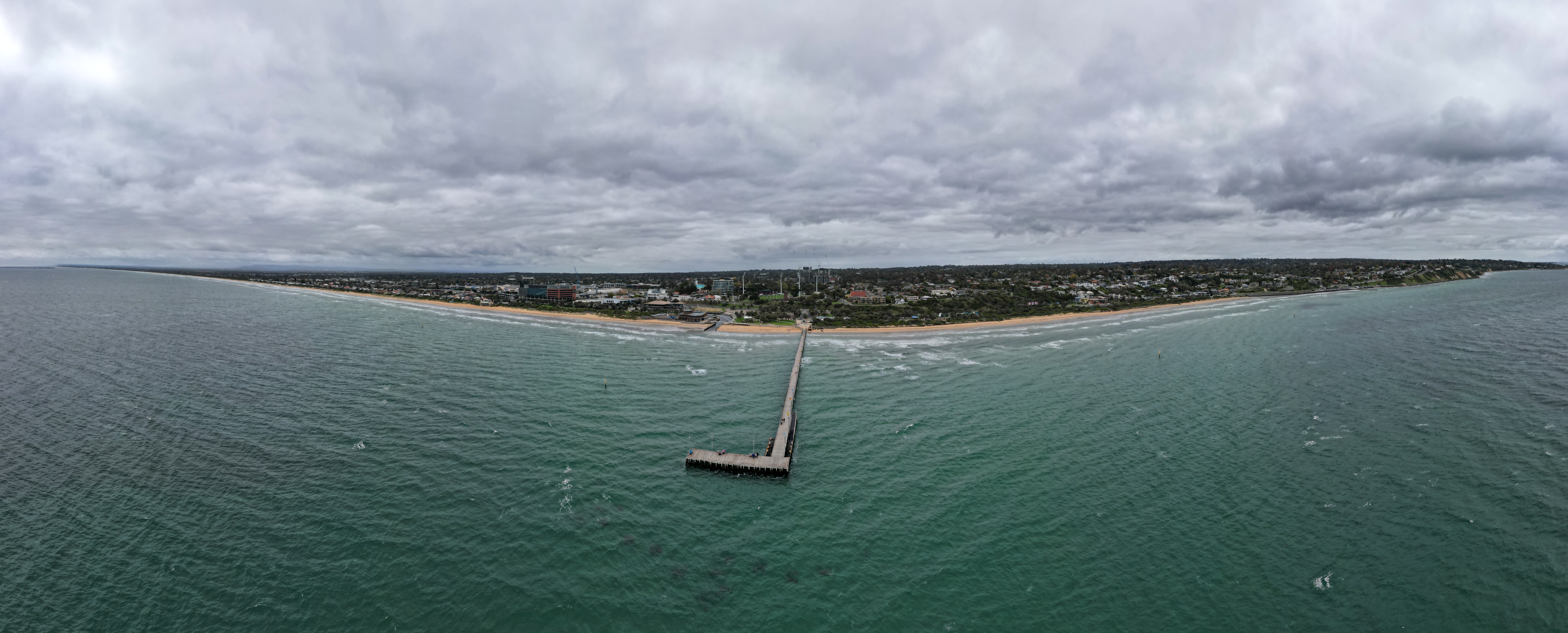
Panorama of Frankston Coastline.

Three sand bars are located off the coastline of Frankston Beach. The first bar is located relatively close the shore which creates shallow troughs in a rhythmic fashion every 150 metres. The second is located 100 metres offshore and also alternates rhythmically, although less than the 150-metre fashion of the first. The third is straight and located 200 metres into the bay.

Frankston City Council also has strict protection policies with regards to the sand dunes and native flora along the Frankston foreshore, and has regularly received commendations for its litter prevention and coastal rehabilitation programs. As a result, its coastline has retained much of its natural element. A raised timber foreshoreway named the Frankston Boardwalk winds through large areas of the foreshore (including the Frankston Foreshore Reserve) in order to protect it whilst allowing it to be enjoyed by visitors.

Only key zones on the foreshore at the Frankston Waterfront have been developed. Around Frankston Pier north to the mouth of Kananook Creek is landscaped with public art, and has a café and restaurants, a playground, the Frankston Visitor Information Centre, Frankston Yacht Club, and Frankston Volunteer Coast Guard. North of it is the Frankston Life Saving Club.

Kananook Creek runs close to the coastline of Port Phillip Bay, leaving a narrow strip of coast several kilometres long almost completely surrounded by water, giving the locality the name Long Island. It is not technically an island, as the creek does not flow into the bay at any point other than its mouth near Frankston Beach. However, in 1984 the Patterson Lakes, which connect to the bay, were joined to Kananook Creek via an underground aqueduct, and a pumping station was built to pump salt water from the lakes into the creek to improve the water quality in the creek.

A substantial sand dune, which was formed over 1000 years ago, once ran parallel to the majority of the Frankston coastline and provided the course for the Frankston railway line (between Mordialloc and Seaford) and for the Nepean Highway (to Olivers Hill).

==== Environment ====
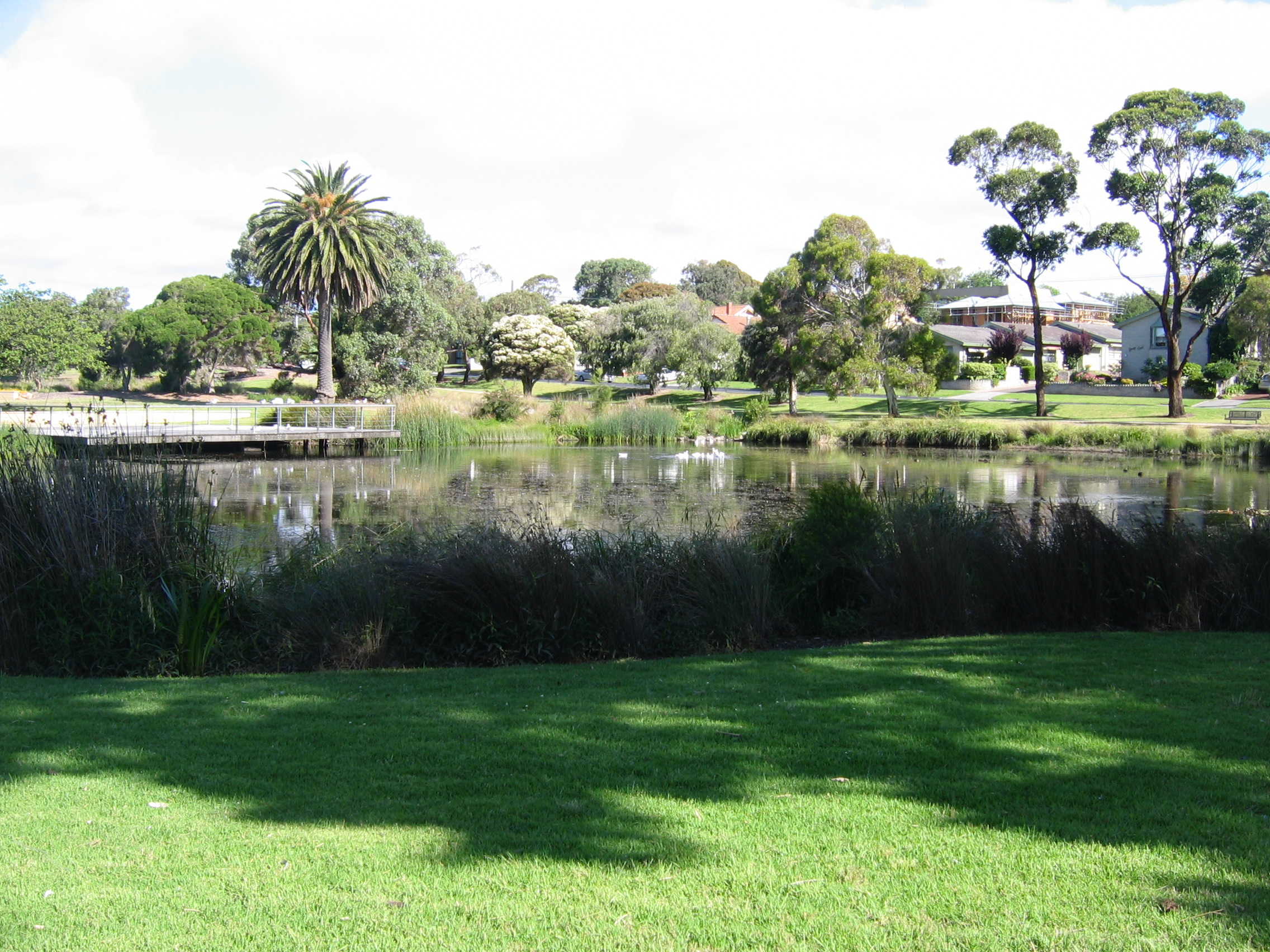
Beauty Park.

Frankston is generally a leafy suburb with a wide variety of natural heritage elements. There are hundreds of floral species that are indigenous to the Frankston area, including over 20 species of orchid (some of which are also endemic to the area), and can be found in large natural reserves as well as formal public gardens in the suburb.

The Frankston Spider Orchid (Caladenia robinsonii) is a rare species of orchid that is endemic to the Frankston area. It produces a 4 cm red and creamy-yellow flower, with five sepals, that exudes a scent which mimics the pheromones of the Thynnid wasp female in order to attract males to pollinate it. It is a threatened species.

Frankston City Council has a variety of programs aiming to better environmental sustainability in the suburb. It won the Bronze Award for its "management of environment, and enhancement of quality of life" at the LivCom International Awards for Livable Communities in 2004. The City of Frankston has also won the Keep Australia Beautiful Victorian Sustainable Cities Award in 2008. It was named the overall Victorian Sustainable City of the Year in 2015.

Large natural parks and reserves in the suburb are: Bunarong Park, Frankston Foreshore Reserve, Lower Sweetwater Creek Reserve, and Paratea Reserve. Large formal public parks and gardens in the suburb are: Ballam Park, Beauty Park, Frankston Waterfront, and George Pentland Botanic Gardens named after former City of Frankston Shire Secretary and Town Clerk George Pentland.

==== Landmarks ====
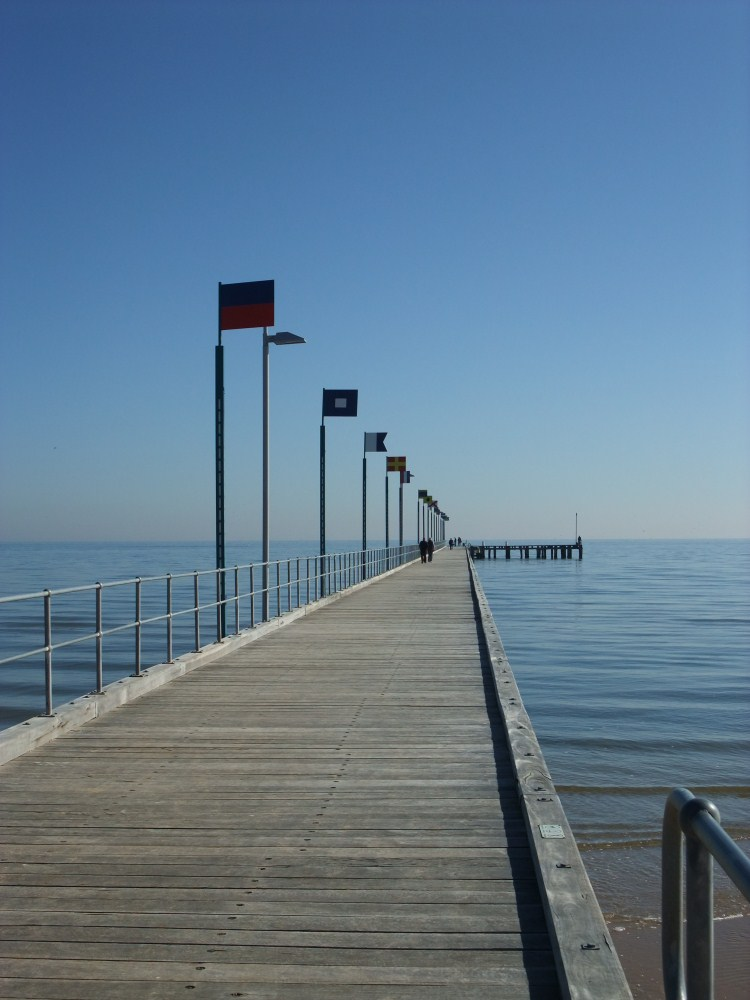
The 150-year-old and 500-metre Frankston Pier is a local landmark.

Ballam Park estate, located on Cranbourne Road in the Frankston locality of Karingal, is home to the first brick house in the Frankston area. The house was built in 1855 for Frank Liardet, by his younger brother Frederick, and was designed in a French Colonial Gothic Revival style by their father Wilbraham. It is listed on the Victorian and Australian heritage registries through the National Trust of Australia. It is managed by the Frankston Historical Society which conducts tours of the house and also maintains a local history museum at the estate.

The 500-metre Frankston Pier is a local landmark of the suburb. Originally built in 1857, it has been both extended as well as repaired a number of times over the years. Near Frankston Pier is the arched pedestrian bridge over the mouth Kananook Creek, erected in 2003 as part of the Frankston Waterfront development, which is also lit in a variety of colours at night.

Frankston Mechanics' Institute, located at 1 Plowman Place in the Frankston Central Business District (CBD), which was established in 1880, is the oldest public building in the suburb. It was expanded in 1915 with an addition to its street frontage, which is now the oldest extant part of the building. According to the Victorian Heritage Database, it was once the site of the first permanent building in the Frankston area, a pub named the Cannanuke Inn, built in the mid-1840s. The use of the site as a meeting place also pre-dates European settlement of Frankston, and was used by the Indigenous Australian clans of the Bunurong tribe on the Mornington Peninsula for corroborees and as a trading place.

McClelland Gallery and Sculpture Park is a major public art gallery in Frankston and on the Mornington Peninsula. Established in 1971, and located at 390 McClelland Drive on the border of Frankston and the City of Frankston suburb of Langwarrin, it is also the leading sculpture park in Australia. It has over 130,000 visitors annually.

The 12-storey Peninsula on the Bay, located at 435 Nepean Highway in the Frankston CBD, is the tallest building in Frankston and on the Mornington Peninsula. Built in 1973 as a shopping centre and offices complex named the Peninsula Centre and designed in a brutalist style, it was once called "the worst building in Australia" by comedian Barry Humphries. It remained mostly vacant during the 2000s, until it was redeveloped as a luxury serviced apartments and offices complex by Asian Pacific Group in 2013.

Frankston Arts Centre is the largest art centre in Frankston and on the Mornington Peninsula, as well as one of the largest in the metropolitan area of Melbourne, and is a major landmark of the suburb. Built in 1995 on the corner of Davey Street and Young Street in the Frankston CBD, it was designed by architect Daryl Jackson. It serves over 250,000 patrons annually.

=== Climate ===
Frankston has a temperate oceanic climate, the same as the rest of the metropolitan area of Melbourne; however, the suburb is usually around 2–3 °C cooler than the Melbourne central business district. Frankston is one of the last areas of Melbourne to experience the cool change weather effect that occurs during summer.

Climate data for Frankston
Month	Jan	Feb	Mar	Apr	May	Jun	Jul	Aug	Sep	Oct	Nov	Dec	Year
Record high °C (°F)	42.0 (107.6)	40.8 (105.4)	37.1 (98.8)	31.1 (88.0)	26.6 (79.9)	21.6 (70.9)	22.4 (72.3)	22.4 (72.3)	27.6 (81.7)	32.5 (90.5)	37.2 (99.0)	40.2 (104.4)	42.0 (107.6)
Mean daily maximum °C (°F)	24.8 (76.6)	24.9 (76.8)	22.7 (72.9)	19.3 (66.7)	16.0 (60.8)	13.6 (56.5)	12.8 (55.0)	13.6 (56.5)	15.6 (60.1)	17.9 (64.2)	20.5 (68.9)	22.6 (72.7)	18.7 (65.7)
Mean daily minimum °C (°F)	15.6 (60.1)	16.0 (60.8)	14.6 (58.3)	12.3 (54.1)	10.6 (51.1)	8.6 (47.5)	8.0 (46.4)	8.3 (46.9)	9.4 (48.9)	10.6 (51.1)	12.3 (54.1)	13.9 (57.0)	11.7 (53.1)
Record low °C (°F)	3.9 (39.0)	9.1 (48.4)	7.1 (44.8)	−1.6 (29.1)	3.2 (37.8)	−0.3 (31.5)	−4.1 (24.6)	−3.9 (25.0)	−1.6 (29.1)	−4.2 (24.4)	0.8 (33.4)	6.3 (43.3)	−4.2 (24.4)
Average rainfall mm (inches)	37.6 (1.48)	52.8 (2.08)	47.5 (1.87)	63.6 (2.50)	68.5 (2.70)	61.1 (2.41)	62.3 (2.45)	64.4 (2.54)	60.4 (2.38)	65.9 (2.59)	58.5 (2.30)	51.6 (2.03)	693.8 (27.31)
Average rainy days (≥ 0.2mm)	5.6	6.3	7.5	10.7	12.2	13.6	15.4	15.0	13.0	12.7	10.4	8.1	130.5
Average relative humidity (%)	59	60	60	63	70	73	74	71	67	61	60	59	65
Source: Bureau of Meteorology (rainfall data is taken from Mount Eliza, as the closest geographically located station to Frankston, as rainfall data from the Frankston AWS is currently unavailable)

== Demographics ==
According to the 2021 census there were 37,331 people in Frankston, with 1.5% being Indigenous Australian, 70.6% of people were born in Australia. The most common countries of foreign birth were England 5.1%, New Zealand 2.4%, China 1.2%, India 1.1% and the Philippines 0.9%.

47.9% of Frankston residents have parents that are both born in Australia, 29.4% have parents that are both born overseas, and 8.4% have only a father and 6.6 have only a mother that is born overseas. The most common ancestries in the suburb are English 39.6%, Australian 33.5%, Irish 11.3%, Scottish 10.7% and German 4.1%. 80.8% speak English at home and the most common languages other than English spoken included Mandarin 1.4%, Greek 1.0%, Russian 0.6%, Spanish 0.6% and Malayalam 0.5%.

The median age in the suburb is 39, with 17.8% of residents being over the age of 65 and 16.6% being under the age of 14. An aging population in the suburb is balanced by several new housing developments in the neighbouring suburbs of the City of Frankston.

=== Religion ===
The most common responses for religion in the 2021 Census in Frankston were No Religion 50.1%, Christianity 24.5^% (Catholic 16.3% and Anglican 8.2%).

Places of worship in the suburb of Frankston are predominantly churches of Christian denominations. Of the most common religions, the Roman Catholic Church has two parishes in the suburb: St. Francis Xavier's in the Frankston Central Business District (CBD), which was established in 1926 (first church built in 1889), and St. John the Evangelist's in Frankston East, and the Greek Orthodox Church has its parish of Theofania in Frankston East. The Anglican Church has two parishes in the suburb: St. Paul's in the Frankston CBD, which was established in 1889 (first church built in 1856), and St. Luke's in Frankston East.

The Uniting Church has two congregations in the suburb, in Frankston and Karingal. The Lutheran Church also has its parish of St. Peter in Karingal, which is closely linked with the Karingal Uniting Church congregation. Of the member-churches which did not join the Uniting Church, there are Presbyterian Church and Reformed Presbyterian Church congregations in the neighbouring City of Frankston suburbs of Frankston North and Frankston South respectively.

There are two Churches of Christ in Frankston; one which is part of the Churches of Christ Conference in Australia and another which is congregationalist. The unassociated Church of Christ, Scientist, has a Christian Science Reading Room in the Frankston CBD. Other large churches in the suburb are the Seventh-day Adventist Church, The Church of Jesus Christ of Latterday Saints and the Pentecostal Jubilee Church, as well as smaller Baptist, Evangelical and non-denominational churches.

Places of worship for a number of other religions are located in the neighbouring suburbs of the City of Frankston. The Ahmadiyya Muslim community has a mosque in Langwarrin; the Brahma Kumaris have a centre for spiritual retreat in Frankston South; the Serbian Orthodox Church has its parish of St. Stefan Decanski in Carrum Downs; the Hindu community has its Shri Shiva Vishnu Temple in Carrum Downs, which is also the largest in Victoria; and the Oriental Orthodox Churches has a Jacobite Syrian parish of St. Mary in Frankston North.

=== Housing ===
A dominant suburban element in the Frankston area means its residential property mix is not as diverse as areas that are closer to the Melbourne central business district—as the suburb has minimal multi-storey development. However, as the economic hub as well as gateway to the Mornington Peninsula, Frankston has been defined as one of the nine activity centres in the metropolitan area of Melbourne in various Victorian state government planning policies—which aim to increase multi-storey property development in the Frankston Central Business District (CBD).

According to the 2021 Australian census, 25.7% of Frankston residents own their property; 32.6% are purchasing their property with a mortgage; and 39.1% are renting their property. 73.4% of occupied private dwellings were separate houses; 6.1% were apartments, flats or units; and 20.3% were semi-detached houses.

Frankston consists mostly of traditional quarter-acre blocks colloquially referred to as the "Australian Dream", and 40% of houses in the suburb consist of three or more bedrooms. A concentration of apartments, flats and units are also centred around the Frankston CBD. Being one of the southernmost suburbs of the metropolitan area of Melbourne, Frankston is also one of its most affordable. As of the March quarter of 2015, the median house price in the suburb is $390,000. Comparatively the median house price of the metropolitan area of Melbourne overall is $638,445, and the median house price of Australia generally is A$576,100.

Some real estate in Frankston, however, routinely sells for well above the median house price for the suburb. For example, properties in the catchment area of Frankston High School, which is one of the most reputable state government schools in Victoria, sell on average for 16.9% more than the median house price. The locality of Olivers Hill, with its panoramic views across Port Phillip, is home to the most expensive real estate in Frankston. Property in the area has sold for between A$3 and A$4 million in 2015, at the same time as the median house price in the suburb of Frankston being A$390,000. Olivers Hill is considered to have one of the top ten residential views in Melbourne.

== Governance ==
The City of Frankston local government area is divided into nine wards, with each of the wards represented by one councillor, which are: Ballam Ward, Centenary Park Ward, Derinya Ward, Elisabeth Murdoch Ward, Kananook Ward, Lyrebird Ward, Pines Ward, Wilton Ward, and Yamala Ward. Mayor Kris Bolam JP leads the city council, with Cr Steffie Conroy as the Deputy Mayor.

Frankston is located in the South Eastern Metropolitan Region for the Victorian Legislative Council. The region is represented by five members; two from the Victorian Labor Party, one from the Victorian Liberal Party, one from the Libertarian Party, and one from the Legalise Cannabis Party. The District of Frankston is the state government district for the Victorian Legislative Assembly that Frankston is located in. The seat has been held by the Victorian branch of the Australian Labor Party since 2014, and the sitting member of parliament is firefighter and former teacher Paul Edbrooke.

At the federal level, Frankston is part of the Dunkley electorate. The seat has been held by the Australian Labor Party since 2019. Following the 2024 Dunkley by-election, the sitting member of parliament for Dunkley is Jodie Belyea.

The state and federal electorates that Frankston is located in are often referred to as part of the "Melbourne Sandbelt" in the media. The term was coined to describe an area from the Melbourne inner-southeastern suburb of Sandringham south to Frankston that has a large amount of golf courses, but is also used to describe the electorates of the area during state and federal government elections.

== Economy ==
Frankston's main economic activities are in the health care, retail, hospitality, and education industries. Two hospitals, numerous health care providers, two regional shopping centres, a hard goods retail park, a university campus, a large TAFE institute as well as various secondary and primary schools are all located within the suburb and are a significant source of employment.

According to the 2011 Australian census, 7.6% of Frankston residents are employed in the health care industry (hospital/residential care services)—making it the largest industry of employment for the suburb. It is followed by 6.8% of residents that are employed in the retail/hospitality industry and 4% in the schools/education industry.

Gross regional product (GRP) of the broader City of Frankston area was A$4.7 billion in 2014. A$251.9 million of GRP was also generated directly from tourism in the Frankston area in 2010, and is a contributor to the A$2.2 billion tourism industry of the greater Mornington Peninsula region. Frankston became a popular seaside destination of Melbourne in the 1880s. And, since the early-2000s, tourism is being reestablished as a key industry in the area. Frankston City Council prepared its first tourism strategy for the area in 2003, which continues to have a focus on its beach and waterfront, cultural and natural heritage, major events and festivals, performing and visual arts, as well as restaurants and shopping—with the majority of which being located within the suburb of Frankston.

Currently the suburb of Frankston is defined by the Victorian state Metropolitan Planning Authority as one of nine activity centres in the metropolitan area of Melbourne. It is also under consideration to be redefined as a "national employment cluster" for its industry strengths in health care and education, as well as for being both an economic hub and a tourism destination within the greater Mornington Peninsula region.

=== Retail & Hospitality ===
Bayside Shopping Centre is a super-regional shopping centre, and the largest in Frankston and on the Mornington Peninsula. It is owned by Vicinity Centres (after merging with Novion Property Group in 2015). It has over 250 speciality stores, restaurants and food outlets. It opened in the Frankston Central Business District (CBD) as three separate malls but slowly came under one jurisdiction. It additionally has an entertainment precinct on Wells Street.

Karingal Hub Shopping Centre is a regional shopping centre serving the locality of Karingal and neighbouring locations, being the second largest mall in Frankston. It is owned and managed by IFM Investors. It encompasses a double-storey mall with an entertainment precinct, also featuring a 'Town Square' designed to bring its locality together. It opened in 1978 on the intersection of Cranbourne Road and Karingal Drive.

Just outside of Bayside Shopping Centre, the biggest shopping street in Frankston is Wells Street. It has a variety of boutiques, independent retailers, cafés and food outlets and used to feature a farmers' market on every Thursday morning on an adjacent street, which doesn't run anymore. In the middle of 2015, Frankston City Council spent A$3.5 million on upgrades to the road.

Off of Wells Street, to the north (leading to the southern entrance of Bayside Shopping Centre), Shannon Mall is a pedestrian mall run by Bayside Shopping Centre that additionally has a number of independent retailers and cafés.

Many restaurants are located in the Frankston CBD, with a large concentration on the Nepean Highway, and cover a variety of cuisines which include: Australian (modern), Chinese (Cantonese, dumplings and modern), French, Indian (North and South), Italian, Japanese (including sashimi/sushi and teppanyaki specifically), Mediterranean (Greek and modern), Middle Eastern, North American (Mexican and modern grill), South American (Argentine and modern), Southeast Asian (fusion), Thai, Vegetarian and Vietnamese (including Pho specifically).

The Frankston Power Centre is a regional hard goods retail park owned by SPG Investments. It has 20 large format stores mainly retailing household goods and electronics as well as play centre and food outlets. It is located between the Frankston CBD and Karingal, near the corner of Cranbourne Road and McMahons Road.

The northwest of the suburb has a number of automotive dealerships, mainly located on Dandenong Road.

==== Pub corner ====
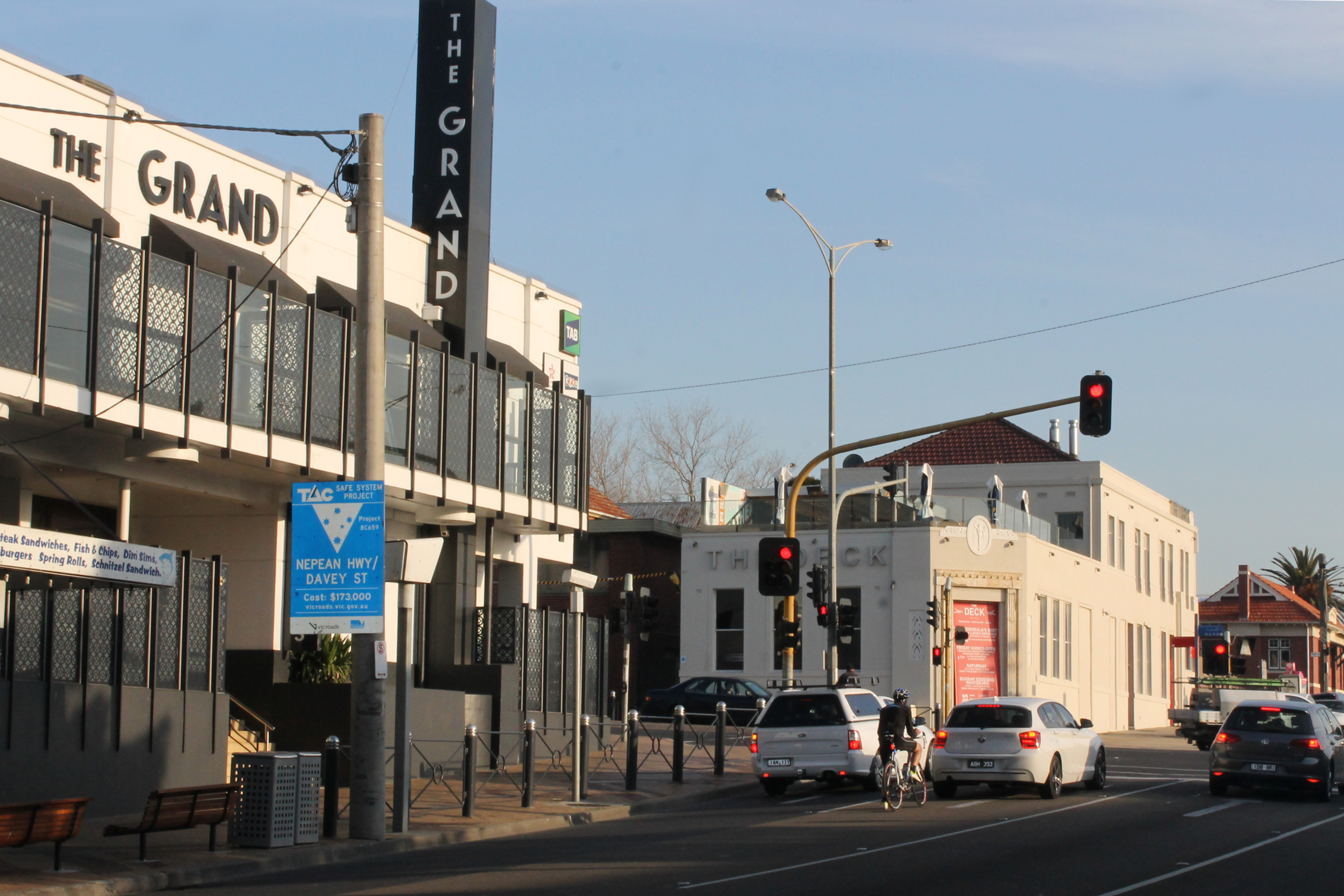
The Grand Hotel and The Deck Bar on the eastern side of "pub corner" – looking south toward the Frankston Mechanics' Institute.

The intersection of Davey Street and Nepean Highway in the Frankston Central Business District (CBD) has been known as a "hotel corner" since the 1890s, and contemporarily as "pub corner". The hotels and pubs on its northwest, northeast and southwest corners, have been operating continuously from this time. Around 100 years later, in the mid-1990s, they were joined by a nightclub on its southeast corner.

The first pub in the Frankston area, the Cannanuke Inn, was located near the southeast corner of the intersection (on the present site of the Frankston Mechanics' Institute at 1 Plowman Place). It was built by pre-emptive Frankston settler James Davey in the mid-1840s. The first hotel on a corner of the intersection, the Frankston Hotel, located on its northwest corner, was licensed on 12 December 1854. The second, the Bay View Hotel, located on its northeast corner, was licensed on 15 November 1873. It was built by James Davey's grandson William Davey Jr. The third, the Prince of Wales Hotel, located on its southwest corner, was licensed on 8 December 1884. They have all been remodelled or demolished and rebuilt over the years.

Its southeast corner has had a chequered history. It was the site of Frankston's Commonwealth Post Office which was built in 1910, and later remodelled with a telephone exchange in 1927 and expanded again in 1941. It ceased operation as a post office and telephone exchange in the 1980s, after which it was remodelled as Chinese restaurant and later as a Captain America theme restaurant. It was remodelled again as a nightclub named The Saloon during the mid-1990s, and Monkey Bar during the 2000s, and even became a strip club briefly, before being remodelled as an upmarket pub in 2013.

== Culture ==
=== Sculpture and visual arts ===
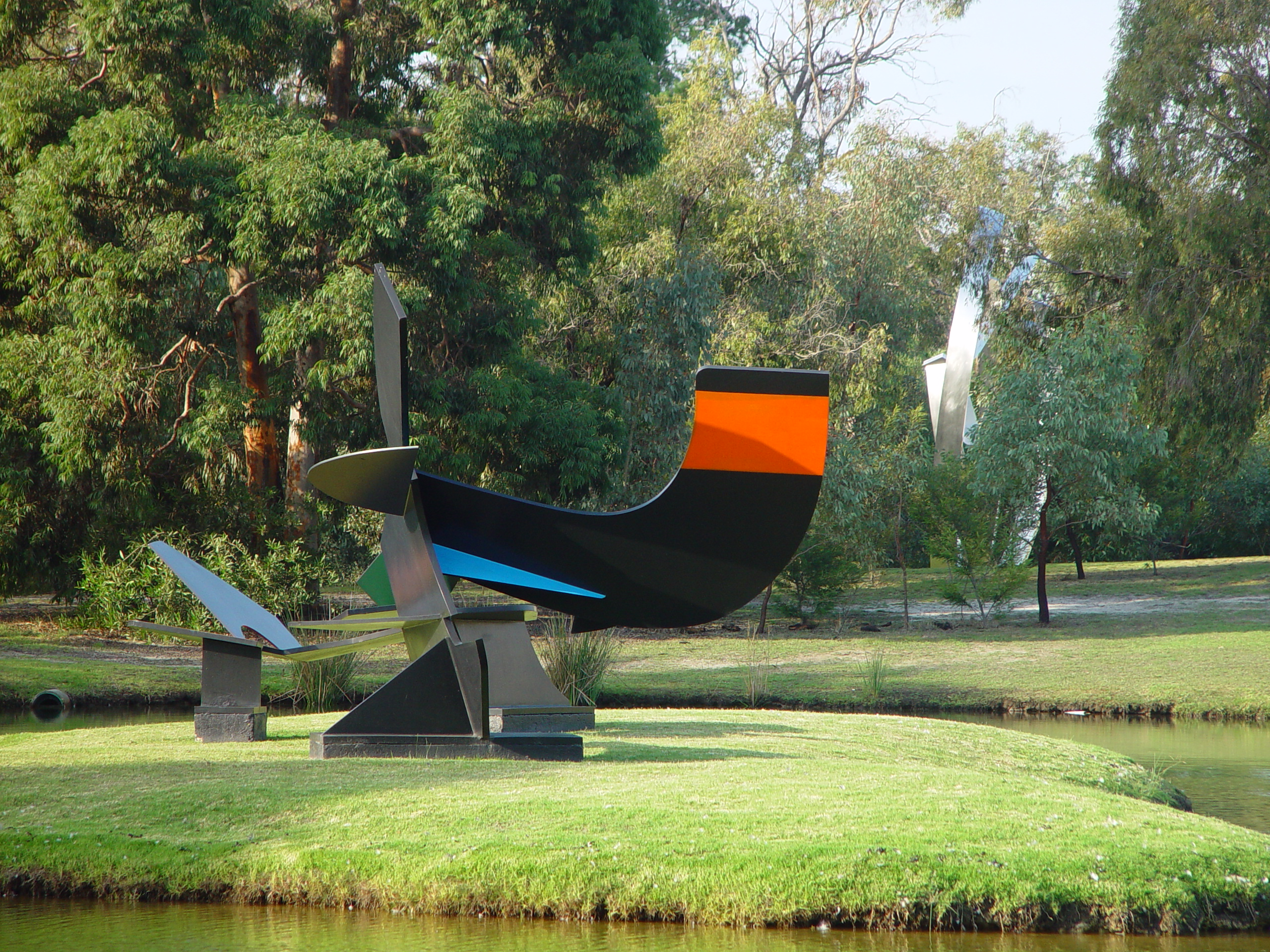
Island Sculpture by Inge King at McClelland Gallery and Sculpture Park.

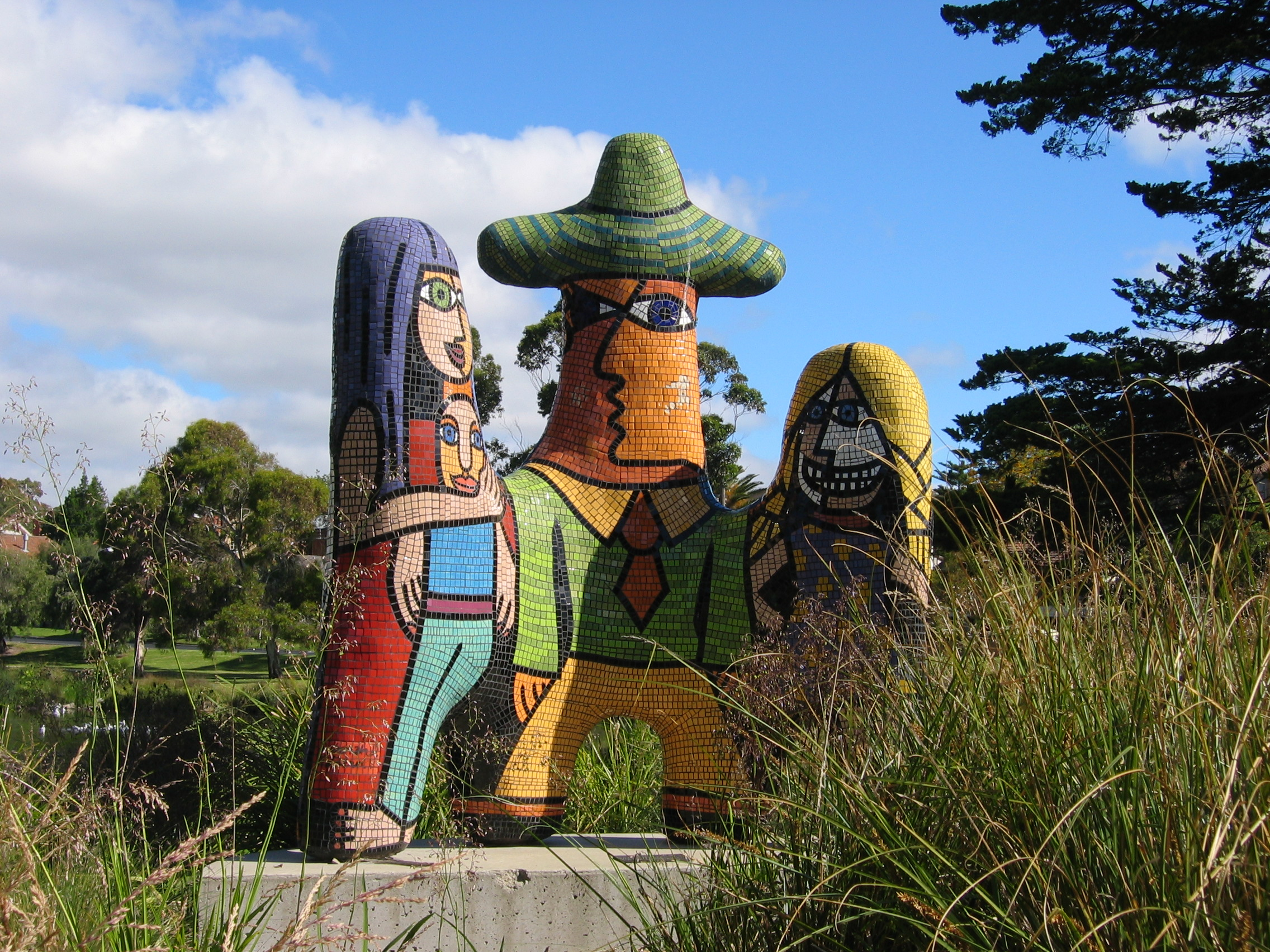
The Power of Community mosaic by Deborah Halpern in Beauty Park.

McClelland Gallery and Sculpture Park is a major public art gallery in Frankston and on the Mornington Peninsula. It was established in 1971, through the bequest of poet Annie May (Nan) McClelland, in honour of her artist brother Harry McClelland. Located at 390 McClelland Drive on the border of Frankston and the City of Frankston suburb of Langwarrin, it is the leading sculpture park in Australia. It is set in 16 hectares of formal park and natural reserve with a permanent collection of over 100 large-scale sculptures by artists such as Peter Corlett, Inge King, Clement Meadmore, Lenton Parr and Norma Redpath. During its first 40 years of operation its governor was philanthropist Dame Elisabeth Murdoch, and it has been supported by the Elisabeth Murdoch Sculpture Foundation since 1989. As of 2015, its current director is John Cunningham. It has over 130,000 visitors annually.

Four artists groups are also based on the grounds of McClelland Gallery and Sculpture Park, which are the McClelland Guild of Artists, McClelland Spinners and Weavers, Frankston Lapidary Club, and Peninsula Woodturners Guild.

The largest and oldest artists group in Frankston and on the Mornington Peninsula is the Peninsula Arts Society which has its own studios and gallery in Frankston South and was founded in 1954. Other artists groups in the suburb are Frankston Photography Club which is one of the largest in the metropolitan area of Melbourne and was founded in 1955, and the Indigenous Australian artists' collective Baluk Arts which was founded in 2009.

Frankston also has over 50 sculptures in public places. Most are located around the Frankston Central Business District (CBD) and at the Frankston Waterfront. Larger additions are Sentinel, a 5-metre wooden sculpture inspired by the deity eaglehawk spirit Bunjil (from the Indigenous Australian Dreamtime mythology) on Young Street by artist Bruce Armstrong; The Power of Community in Beauty Park by mosaic artist Deborah Halpern; Sightlines along Frankston Pier by installation artist Louise Laverack, which consists of 22 nautical flag-themed weather vanes and light panels that reflect the movement of the waves below; and a life-size bronze statue of Dame Elisabeth Murdoch by sculptor Peter Corlett in the foyer of the Frankston Arts Centre.

Southern Way, the operator of the PeninsulaLink freeway, has a partnership with McClelland Gallery and Sculpture Park to place sculptures at the intersection of Cranbourne Road. The sculptures are replaced every two years with the previous being transferred to McClelland Gallery and Sculpture Park until 2037. The first was a wind-activated kinetic sculpture named the Tree of Life by artist Phil Price, which was installed in 2012 and immediately became popular with residents and motorists. It was replaced in 2015 with a controversial 9-metre chrome-coloured sculpture of a garden gnome named Reflective Lullaby by artist Gregor Kregar.

In addition to permanent sculpture, Frankston is also home to Sand Sculpting Australia's annual sand festival. Held over four months from 26 December at the Frankston Waterfront, it is the largest exhibition of sand art in Australia and one of the largest in the Southern Hemisphere.

=== Music and performing art ===
Frankston has a number of performing arts groups, including: amateur theatre companies, amateur and professional choirs, a concert band, an orchestra and a circus troupe. The largest of these groups is the Frankston Music Society which was founded by concert pianist Vera Bradford in 1967. It incorporates the Frankston Symphony Orchestra which was established in 1968, and the Mornington Peninsula Chorale which was established in 1979. Frankston City Band is the oldest music group in the suburb and was founded in 1949. Frankston is also home to the Australian Welsh Male Choir which was founded in the suburb in 1974.

Frankston Theatre Group is the oldest dramatic theatre company in the suburb and was founded in 1942. There are also two musical theatre companies in the suburb, Peninsula Light Operatic Society (PLOS) and Panorama Theatre Company, which were founded in 1960 and 1979 respectively. Smaller theatre companies include: the youth theatre company People's Playhouse which was founded in 1995, and the contemporary theatre company Little Theatre which was founded by actor Kaarin Fairfax in 2009. Frankston is also home to the Hip Cat Youth Circus troupe which was founded at the Frankston Arts Centre in 2006.

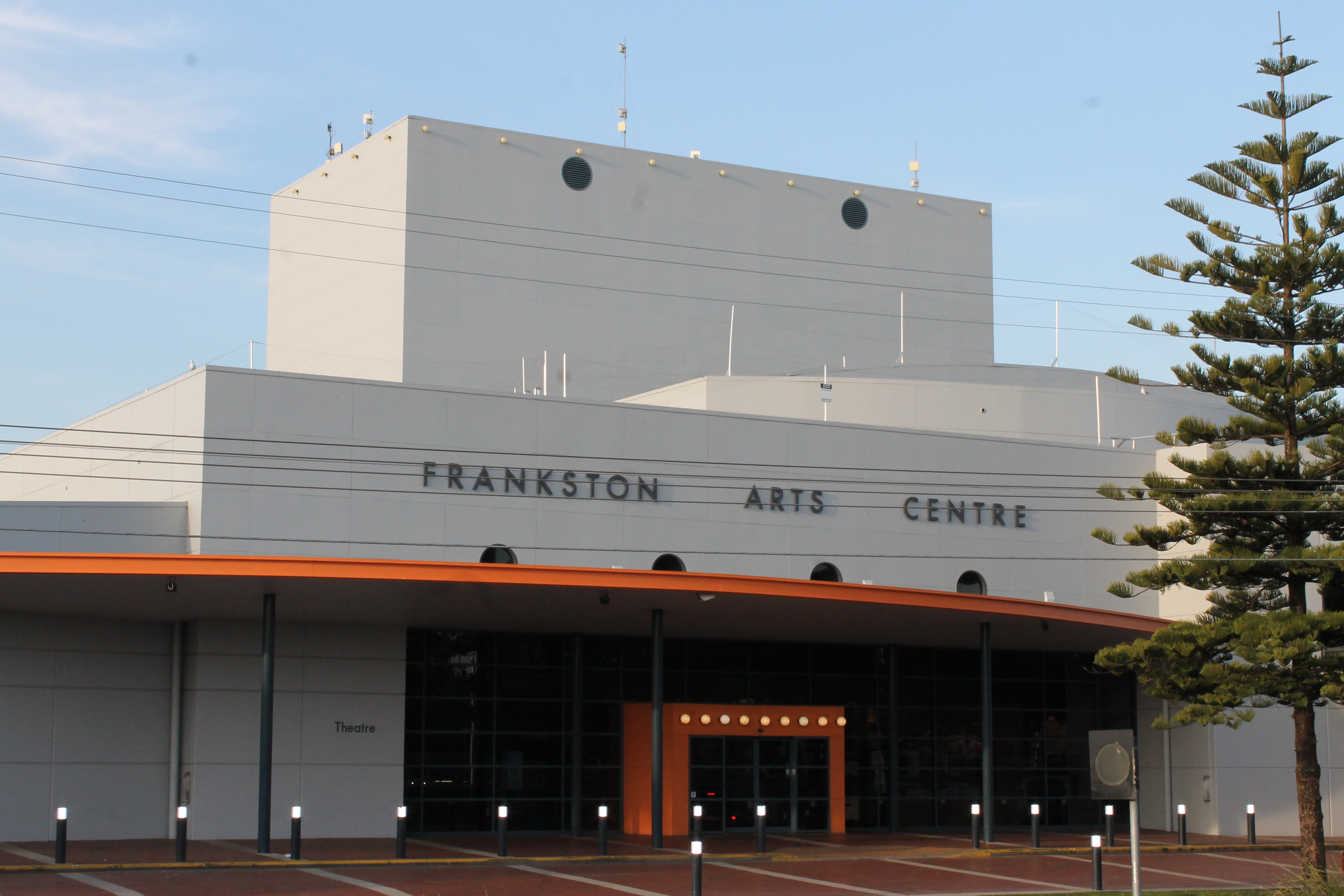
Frankston Arts Centre is one of the largest in Melbourne.

The Frankston Arts Centre is the largest art centre in Frankston and on the Mornington Peninsula, as well as one of the largest in the metropolitan area of Melbourne, which is owned by Frankston City Council. Located on the corner of Davey Street and Young Street in the Frankston Central Business District (CBD), and designed by architect Daryl Jackson, it opened in 1995. It houses an 800-seat theatre with the second largest proscenium arched stage in Victoria. Along with its 194-seat flexible theatre named Cube37, it also houses exhibition space, a studio and workshop and a 500-seat function hall. It plays host to both state and national performing arts companies including regular shows by the Melbourne Symphony Orchestra and Victorian Opera and as a tour venue for the Australian Opera, Bell Shakespeare Company, Melbourne International Film Festival, Sydney Dance Company, and a number of other major production companies. It serves over 250,000 patrons annually.

The George Jenkins Theatre is a 426-seat theatre, and the second largest in Frankston, which is owned by Monash University. It is located at the Peninsula campus, on McMahons Road in Frankston, and is a theatre of the Monash Academy of Performing Arts (MAPA), but is also used by local performing arts groups. It opened in 1973 as part of the former Frankston Teachers' College (which was located on the site of the Peninsula campus) and was named after its long-serving principal.

A strong contemporary music scene is centred around "pub corner" (the hotels and pub at the intersection of Davey Street and Nepean Highway) in the Frankston CBD, and a number of successful musicians and bands have come from the suburb, such as 28 Days, The Basics, Lee Harding, Madison Avenue, Superheist, and the Belair Lip Bombs.

=== Events and festivals ===
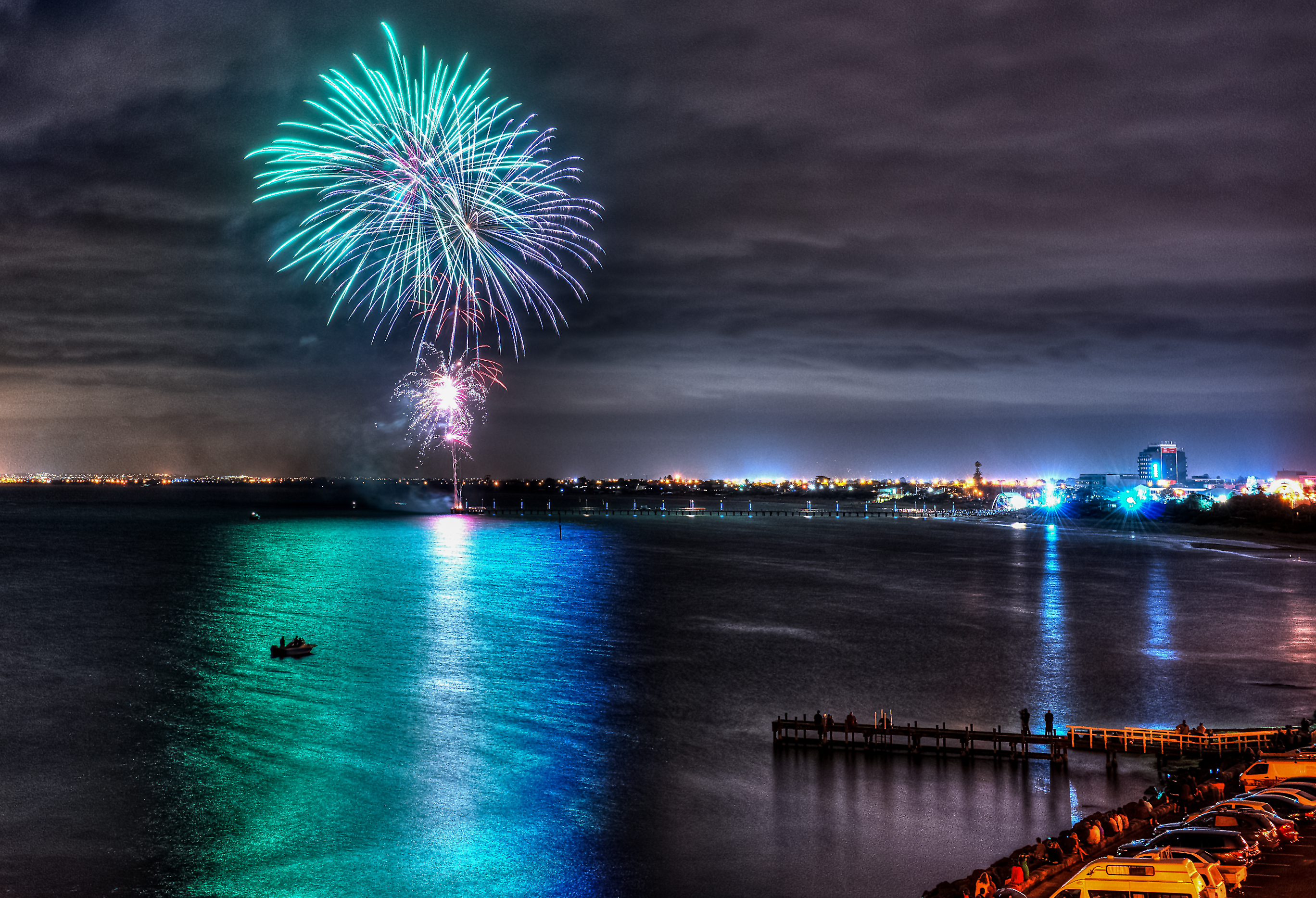
Fireworks display at the 2014 Frankston Waterfront Festival.

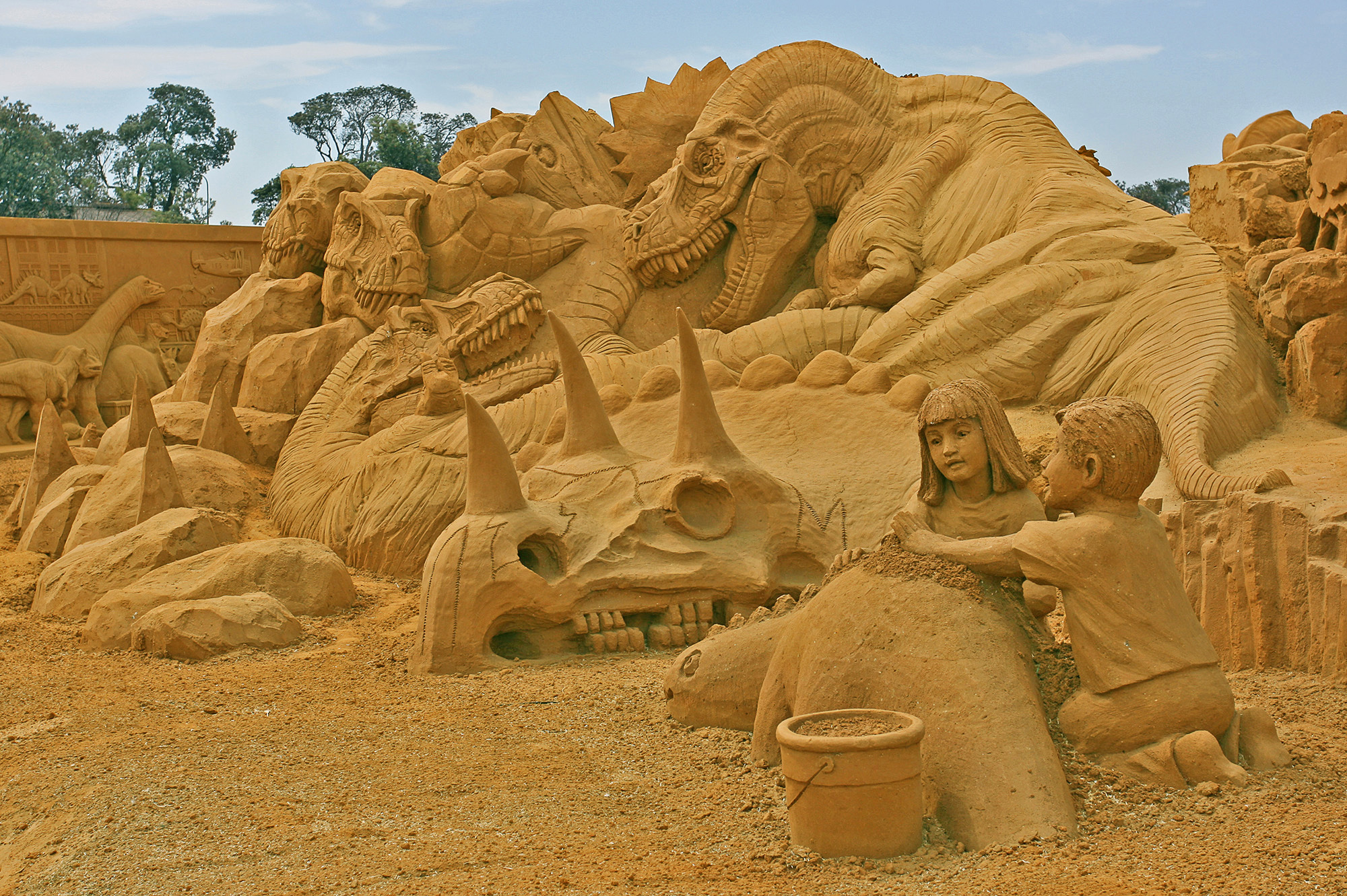
Sand sculpture at the 2008–2009 Dinostory Sand Sculpting Australia festival.

The Christmas Festival of Lights has been held annually in early December since 1998, and is the largest in Frankston's events calendar. It takes place outside the Frankston Civic Centre and Frankston Arts Centre on the corners of Davey Street and Young Street (which are closed to traffic during the festival) in the Frankston central business district (CBD). The festival includes: carnival rides, community activities and exhibitions, food stalls, live carols and music, parades and a Santa Claus procession. The festival culminates with the lighting of the 100 ft and 100-year-old Norfolk pine tree (Araucaria heterophylla) outside the Frankston Civic Centre and is followed by a large fireworks display. The festival night attracts over 45,000 people.

Frankston Waterfront Festival is a celebration of Frankston's seaside location that is held annually over a weekend in mid-January. The festival takes place at the Frankston Waterfront precinct and includes: carnival rides, community activities and exhibitions, fireworks display, a food and wine market, live music and water activities along Frankston Beach and Kananook Creek. The festival also coincides with Sand Sculpting Australia's annual exhibition, which is the largest display of sand sculpting annually in Australia. The exhibition attracts Australian and international artists who sculpt 3,500 tonnes of sand into artwork according to an annual theme. It opens on Boxing Day each year and runs till the end of April. The Frankston Waterfront Festival weekend attracts around 25,000 people, and the Sand Sculpting Australia exhibition attracts over 230,000 people during its four-month run.

Ventana Fiesta is boutique festival celebrating Latin American, Portuguese and Spanish culture held annually since 2006. It is staged over a month between February and March. It takes place at sites around Frankston and Carrum Downs, and includes: Ventana Arte – an art and craft market; Ventana Film – a film festival; Ventana Musica – traditional music performances; FEVA Cup – a beach soccer tournament; and culminates with the Ventana Street Fiesta – a live music and dance party held in Wells Street Plaza in the Frankston CBD. Frankston is also a sister city to Susono in Japan, and the Frankston-Susono Friendship Association stages a Japanese Cultural Fair annually at the Frankston Arts Centre. Frankston also has Sister City relations with Wuxi (China), Annapolis (United States) and Suva (Fiji).

The Greek Orthodox Archdiocese of Australia's Blessing of the Waters ceremony is a Christian religious event held at Frankston Beach. According to local Greek Orthodox customs, a wooden cross is thrown into Port Phillip from Frankston Pier and swimmers then race to retrieve it. The swimmer who retrieves the cross is said to be blessed with 12 months of prosperity and good luck. In Eastern Christian tradition, the event is held to commemorate the baptism of Jesus in the Jordan River, and takes place on Epiphany Day (6 January). Frankston was the first place in the state of Victoria to stage the ceremony, which has been held at Frankston Beach for over 50 years. A Greek cultural celebration at the Frankston Waterfront follows the ceremony, which includes: traditional music, dancing and food.

Good Friday in Frankston is a Christian religious event that has been held at the Frankston Waterfront since 2005. It is staged by City Life Church and the Frankston Ministers' Network. In Christian tradition, the event is held to commemorate the crucifixion of Jesus, and takes place on Good Friday (Western Christian date observance). The "Road to Jerusalem" is a procession that reenacts the Sanhedrin trial, carrying of the cross and crucifixion of Jesus which takes place during the event. It proceeds through the streets of the Frankston CBD to the Frankston Waterfront and is followed by a celebration, which includes: Christian music and community activities and exhibitions.

== Health ==
The suburb of Frankston is at the centre of a large health care industry within the broader City of Frankston area—which is a health care hub for the greater Mornington Peninsula region. Health care is also the largest industry of employment for the suburb, with 7.6% of Frankston residents being employed in the hospital/residential care services sector. Four hospitals providing secondary, tertiary and specialist care are located in the suburb supported by numerous primary care providers in the surrounding area.

According to Australian Government data collected from the former Medicare Local system; between 2011 and 2012, 84% of residents in the combined City of Frankston and Shire of Mornington Peninsula catchment area rated their health as being either "good" or higher. This is close to the average of 85% in Australia, according to the Organisation for Economic Co-operation and Development (OECD) Better Life Index, which is correlated from the Medicare Local system data.

Advancements in health care have taken place in Frankston and have been led by Frankston people for over a hundred years. First during World War I, when a military hospital was established in the City of Frankston suburb of Langwarrin in order to treat Australian soldiers returning with venereal disease from Egypt and France. Between 1915 and 1916, research at the hospital led to reducing the length of venereal disease and halving the cost of its treatment. It also advanced the burgeoning field of occupational therapy in Australia, during this time.

In the second half of the 20th century; the Frankston virologist Ruth Bishop lead the research team that discovered the rotavirus in 1973, and the Frankston microsurgeon Graeme Miller lead the surgical team that performed the world's first successful scalp replantation in 1976. At the turn of the 21st century, research into botulinum toxin injection therapy for paralysis at Frankston Rehabilitation Hospital by the rehabilitation specialist Nathan Johns resulted in a stroke victim standing and walking again in 2009 after being paralysed for 20 years.

=== Hospitals ===
Further information: Frankston Hospital and St John of God Frankston Rehabilitation Hospital

Frankston Hospital is a major 340 bed public hospital, and the largest in Frankston and on the Mornington Peninsula, which is a part of the Peninsula Health Care network. It is the chief provider of acute secondary and tertiary care for the broader City of Frankston area and the greater Mornington Peninsula region. It opened in 1941 at 2 Hastings Road in Frankston, and has been significantly expanded over time. Its most recent expansion included an A$81 million emergency department in 2015—which is one of the largest and busiest in Victoria. It is a teaching hospital affiliated with nearby Monash University as well as Deakin University.

Peninsula Private Hospital is a 166-bed private hospital, and the second largest hospital in Frankston, owned by Australian Unity and a part of the Ramsay Health Care network. It provides acute secondary and some tertiary care and also has a number of primary care providers. The original hospital opened in 1976 and was located on Cranbourne Road in the Frankston locality of Karingal. The current hospital, at 525 McClelland Drive in Karingal, was built in 1999. It was expanded with a new intensive care unit in 2012, and a A$55 million emergency department in 2016. It is also a teaching hospital.

Frankston Rehabilitation Hospital is a 69-bed private rehabilitation hospital, and the largest in Frankston and on the Mornington Peninsula, owned by the St John of God Health Care network. It is a major provider of specialist physical and neurological rehabilitation care in the broader City of Frankston area and the greater Mornington Peninsula region. It opened in 2000 and is located at 255–265 Cranbourne Road in Karingal—the former site of the Peninsula Private Hospital.

Frankston Private Day Surgery is a 27-bed private outpatient surgery owned by Generation Health Care and a part of the Healthscope and Genesis health care networks. It provides surgical and oncological procedures and also has some primary care providers. It opened in 2006 and is located at 24–28 Frankston-Flinders Road in Frankston. In 2015, Healthscope announced plans to expand the outpatient surgery to an inpatient hospital named Frankston Private Hospital. The hospital is to be built in three stages and will have an additional 150 beds. The first stage, initially providing an additional 60 beds, will cost A$35 million.

=== Amenities ===
Frankston City Council's Peninsula Aquatic Recreation Centre (Frankston PARC) is the largest health and aquatic recreation facility in Frankston and on the Mornington Peninsula. It has four swimming pools, including an Olympic-size pool (50 metres) and one of the largest warm-water exercise and rehabilitation pools in Victoria; a gym and a health and wellness centre as well as other related facilities; and provides fitness programs and is home to a number of swimming squads. It opened in 2014 and is located on the corner of Cranbourne Road and Olive Grove near the Frankston Central Business District (CBD).

Monash Peninsula Activity and Recreation Centre (Monash PARC) is another large health and recreation facility, and the second largest in Frankston, which is owned by Monash University. It includes the Peninsula Health and Fitness Centre; an exercise physiology lab as well as a movement and performance studio; and is associated with the physical education, occupational therapy and physiotherapy programs of the university. It is located at the Peninsula campus of Monash University on McMahons Road in Frankston and is open to the public.

== Sports ==
The suburb of Frankston also supports a number of community level clubs for Australian rules football, cricket, golf, rugby league, basketball, netball, soccer and tennis, as well as baseball, hockey, badminton, volleyball, gymnastics, athletics and croquet clubs. The beach area supports a yacht club, a surf lifesaving club and the state's oldest Australian Volunteer Coast Guard flotilla. Frankston also boasts one of the largest public skate parks in Australia, and urban skateboarding is popular.

Football (soccer) has fast become one of the most popular sports played at a junior level in the Frankston area with playing numbers increasing every year. Langwarrin Soccer Club and Frankston Pines are the leading clubs in the Frankston area both participating in the Victorian State League 1. Other teams in the area are Seaford United, Peninsula Strikers, Skye United and Baxter.

Australian rules football is popular in the suburb, and is played at both a regional and state level. The Frankston Bombers, Karingal Bulls and Frankston Y.C.W. Stonecats play in the regional Mornington Peninsula Nepean Football League (in the Peninsula and Nepean Divisions respectively). The state club in the suburb is the Frankston Football Club, which plays in the Victorian Football League. In previous years, Frankston was the recruiting zone for professional Australian Football League clubs, Hawthorn, and later St Kilda, and many star players from each team were recruited from Frankston (see List of people from Frankston).

The St Kilda Football Club signed a deal with the City of Frankston in 2007 to relocate its training base to Belvedere Park in Seaford. The deal included a $10 million development of a training and administration facility which was completed in 2010, based on the facilities of the UK's Chelsea and Aston Villa football clubs.

Indoor and outdoor beach volleyball is also becoming increasingly popular in the suburb of Frankston. 2008 marked the inauguration of the Frankston Beach Volleyball Series (part of the Virgin Blue Beach Volleyball Series) which attracted A-list players, including Olympian Tamsin Barnett. The event was also broadcast on national television and, on the first day, the Nine Network's Today broadcast live from the event.

Frankston Raiders play rugby league in NRL Victoria.

Frankston South Community & Recreation Centre is home to Mornington Peninsula Badminton Inc.

=== Facilities ===
Many sporting fields and some small stadiums exist in the suburb. The historic Frankston Park (home of the Victorian Football League's Frankston Football Club) and the Frankston Basketball Stadium (home of the Australian Basketball Association's Frankston Blues). There are three golf courses in Frankston, the 1912-established Frankston Golf Course, Centenary Park Golf Course and the Peninsula Country Club (with two more in the greater City of Frankston). Also, the City of Frankston Bowling Club (lawn bowls) once hosted the World Bowls Tournament in 1980. The men's singles event was won by David Bryant.

== Education ==
Various institutions are located in Frankston that support each level of education—early/kindergarten, primary, secondary, special development, technical and higher/university. Education is also the third largest industry of employment for the suburb, with 4% of Frankston residents being employed in the schools/education sector.

=== Primary and secondary ===
There are 11 primary schools in the suburb; eight of which are Victorian state government schools, and three that are Catholic-aligned independent schools. There are four secondary schools in the suburb; Frankston High School, McClelland College and Mount Erin College are state government schools, and John Paul College is a Catholic independent school. There are also two special development schools in the suburb; Frankston Special Development School and the Naranga School, which are state government schools, and provide K–12 (early, primary and secondary) education to students with varying intellectual disabilities.

Frankston Primary School (No. 1464) on Davey Street in Frankston is the oldest school in the suburb—continually operating at its original site—which is a state government school and was established in 1874. Its old school house dates from 1889 and is now operated as an education history museum by the Frankston Historical Society. The Woodleigh School is the oldest school in the broader City of Frankston area, which is a secular K–12 independent school and was established in 1856. It was formerly located in the suburb of Frankston, on High Street, until it relocated its junior campus to Frankston South in 1970 and its senior campus to Langwarrin South in 1975.

Frankston High School is one of the most reputable state government schools in Victoria with an excellent academic record attained through a range of extension programs. Admittance to the school is determined by residing within its catchment area. Real estate agents market residential properties as being near the school more often than any other, except Balwyn High School, in the Melbourne inner-eastern suburb of Balwyn North. Research from the Real Estate Institute of Victoria (REIV) also identified that properties in the catchment area of the school sell for 16.9% more than others in Frankston compared with 4% more in Balwyn North.

=== Tertiary ===
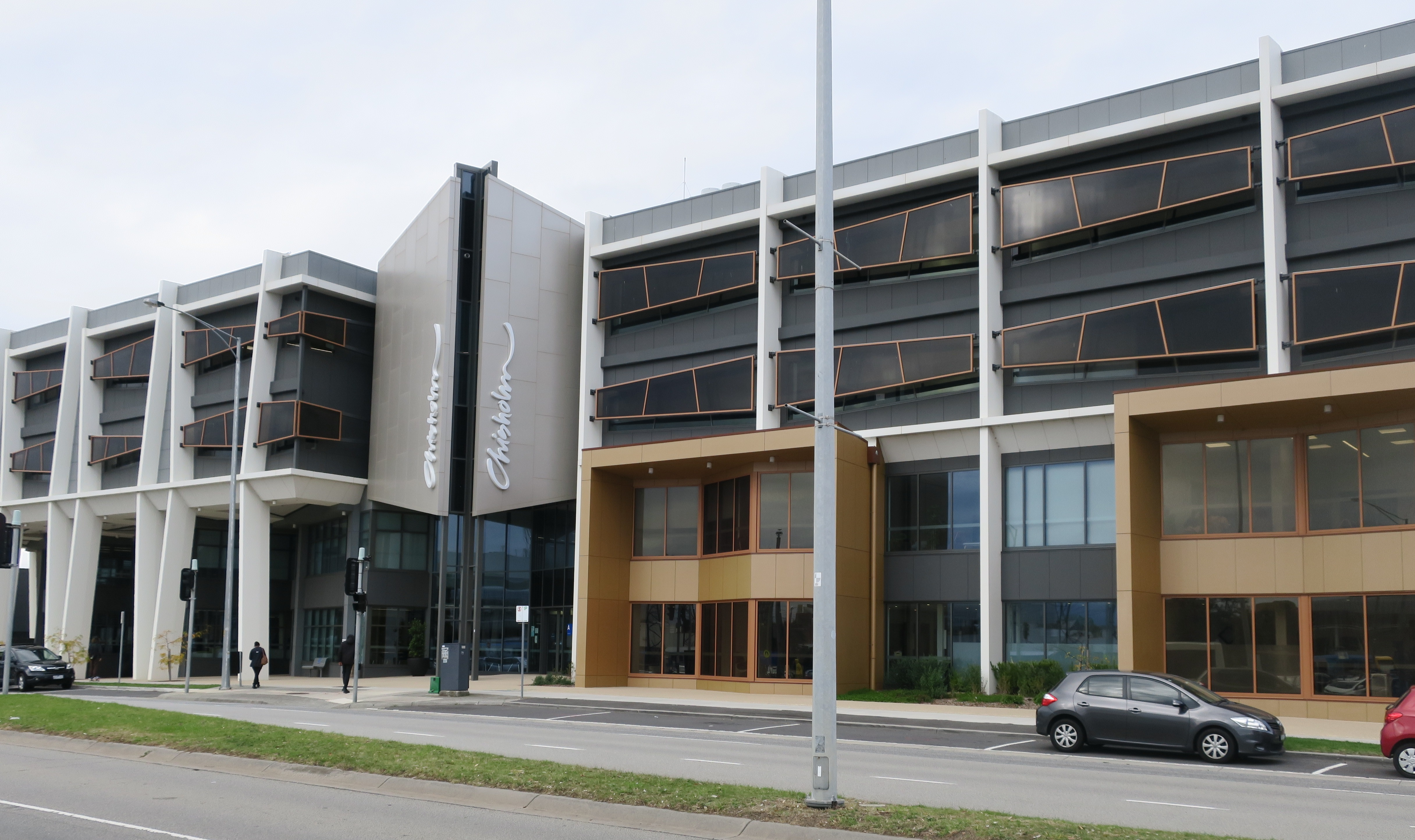
Chisholm TAFE Frankston

The Frankston campus of Chisholm Institute is the largest provider of technical and further education (TAFE) in Frankston and on the Mornington Peninsula. Established at the turn of the 20th century, it was initially named Frankston Technical School and was one of the first in Victoria. It later became the Frankston College of TAFE in 1974, before merging with a number of other colleges of TAFE in the southeast metropolitan area of Melbourne to form the Chisholm Institute in 1998. The institute takes its name from the former Chisholm Institute of Technology, which had a campus in Frankston before merging with Monash University in 1990, and had taken its name from the 19th century humanitarian Caroline Chisholm. It is located on Fletcher Road in the Frankston Central Business District (CBD).

The fifth largest campus of Monash University is located in the suburb, on McMahons Road in Frankston, and was established in 1990. Named the Peninsula campus, it is unique among Monash University campuses in that it focuses on the industry strengths specific to area it is located in. For Frankston, this includes: commerce, education and health (with an emphasis on community and emergency health). It is also affiliated with nearby Frankston Hospital. The campus is located on the site of the former Chisholm Institute of Technology, which was founded in 1983, and merged with Monash University in 1990. It was also the Frankston Teachers' College from 1959 to 1973, as well as the State College of Victoria from 1974 to 1982. Before becoming an academic campus in 1959, the site was a residential property named Struan. An Arts and Crafts style country house built on the property dates from 1924, and now serves as the postgraduate students' centre of the campus.

== Transport ==
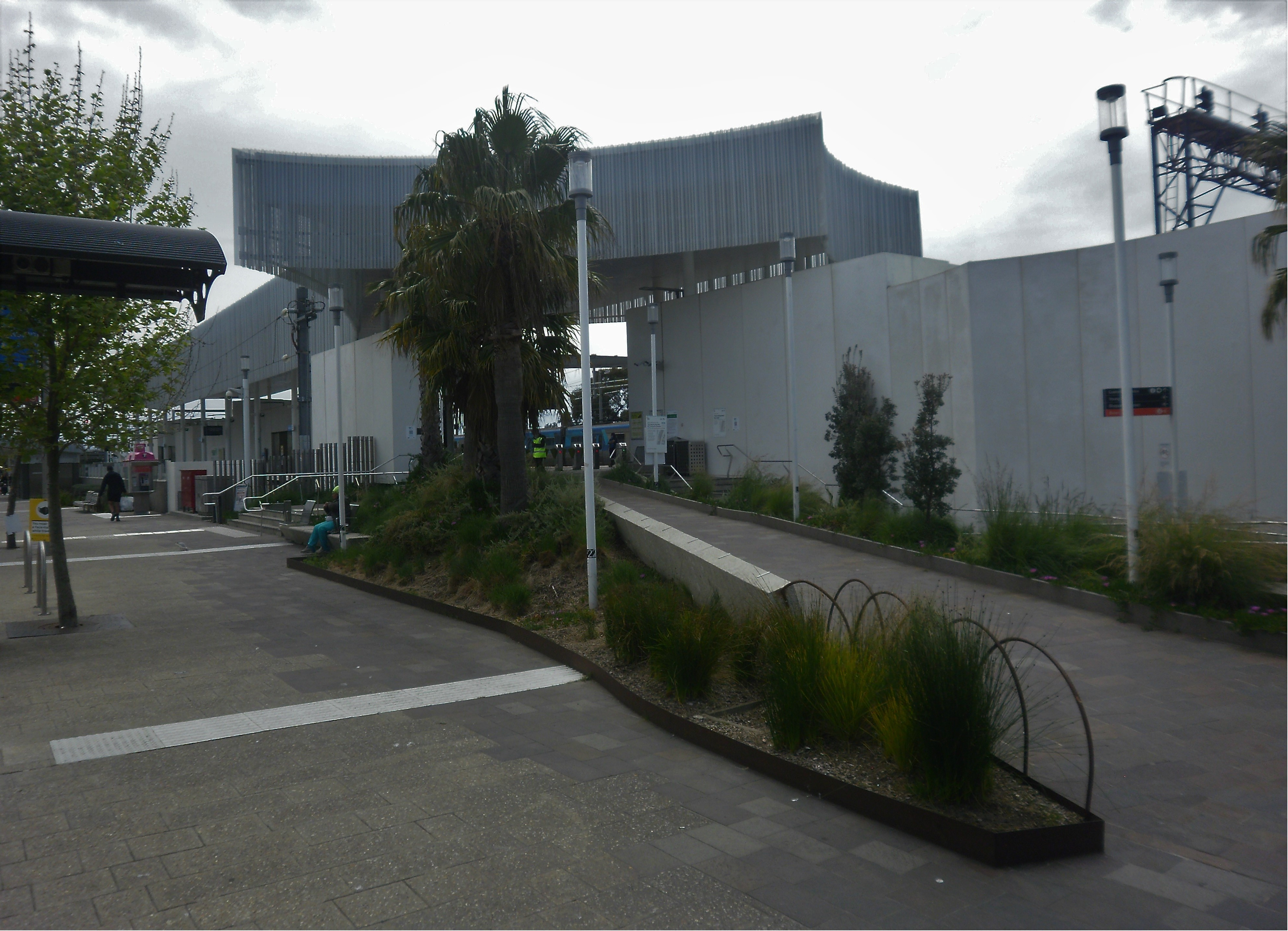
Frankston railway station entrance

Being one of the southernmost suburbs of the metropolitan area of Melbourne, as well as the gateway to the Mornington Peninsula, Frankston is extensively serviced by both railway and roadway. In particular, the Frankston railway line (named so because Frankston railway station is the last metropolitan station on the line) connects the suburb directly with the Melbourne central business district. The regional Stony Point railway line then runs from Frankston and connects it with the eastern suburbs and towns of the Shire of Mornington Peninsula.

A public transport terminus, with Frankston railway station at its centre, is located on Young Street in the Frankston Central Business District (CBD). From the terminus, local bus services run throughout the suburbs of the broader City of Frankston area, and connect it with the suburbs of the neighbouring cities of Casey, Dandenong and Kingston. Regional bus services also run from the terminus, and connect the suburb with the western suburbs and towns of the Shire of Mornington Peninsula. All rail lines and bus services use the Myki ticketing system, and the suburb is located in Zone 2 of the Melbourne public transport network.

By road, the A$2.5 billion EastLink tollway, which opened in 2008, connects the suburbs of the City of Frankston directly with the suburbs of the neighbouring City of Dandenong, as well as the cities of Maroondah and Whitehorse. The A$759 million PeninsulaLink freeway, which opened in 2013, connects with EastLink at the City of Frankston suburb of Seaford in the north and ends at the Shire of Mornington Peninsula town of Mount Martha in the south. The freeway also includes a 50 km shared use path, which connects with the EastLink path at the neighbouring City of Kingston suburb of Patterson Lakes in the north, and ends at the Shire of Mornington Peninsula town of Moorooduc in the south.

== Media ==
In addition to the major media services of Melbourne, Frankston is also served by a weekly local newspaper the Frankston Times, published by Mornington Peninsula News Group. The News Limited weekly local newspaper Frankston Standard Leader ceased publication in 2020 and is now an online-only publication.

== People ==
Notable people from Frankston

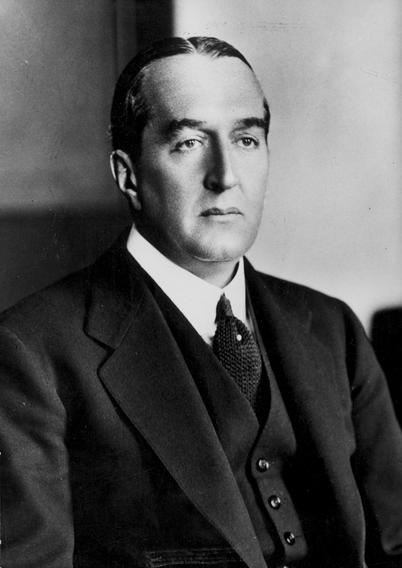
The Rt. Hon. Viscount Bruce of Melbourne, 8th Prime Minister of Australia

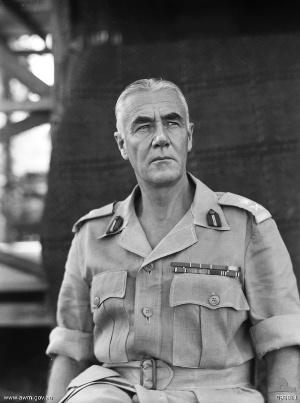
Lt. Gen. Sir Vernon Sturdee, Chief of the Australian Army during World War II

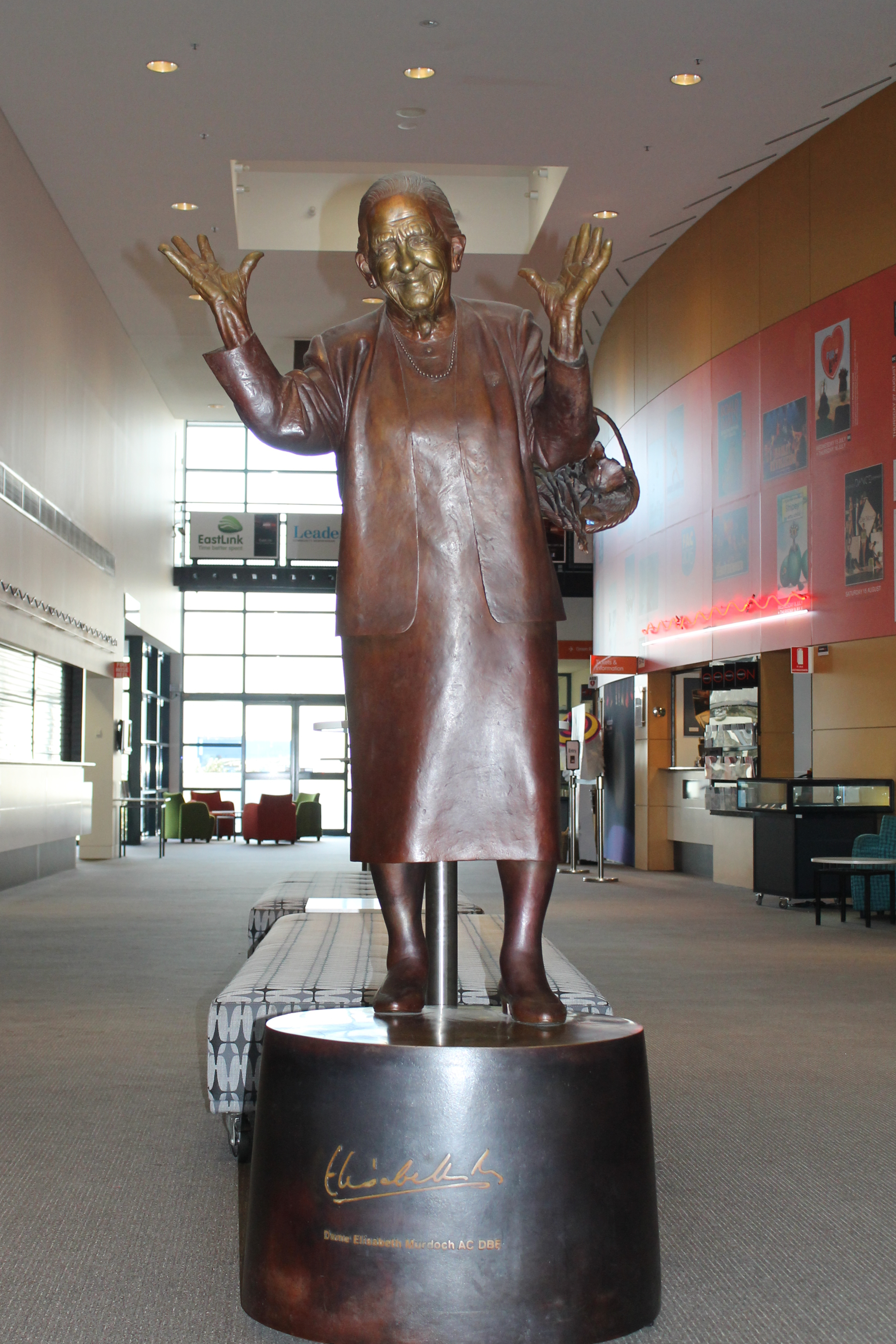
Dame Elisabeth Murdoch, philanthropist

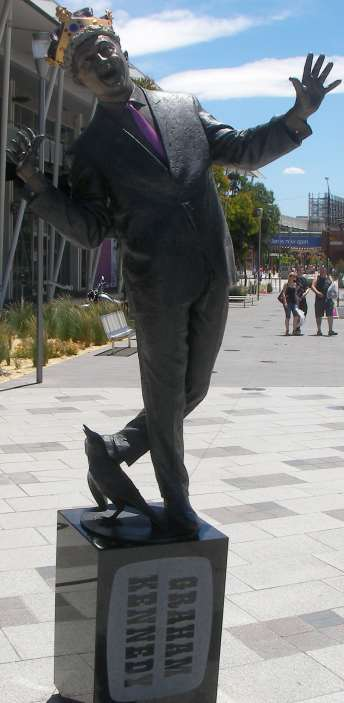
Graham Kennedy, "king of Australian television"

Prof. Ruth Bishop, virologist who discovered the rotavirus

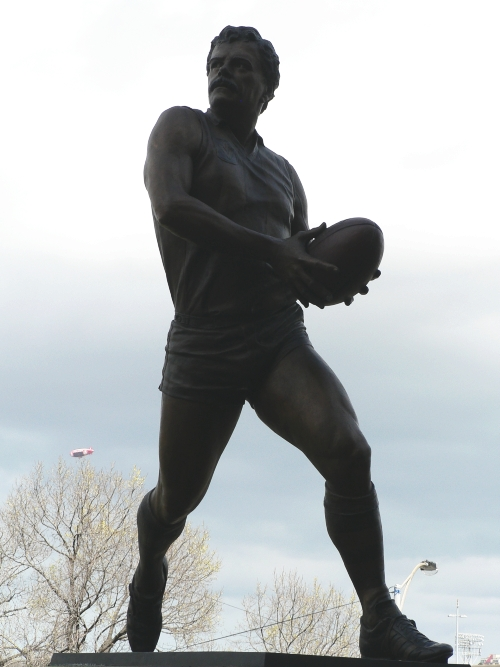
Leigh Matthews, Australian rules football "player of the century"

Tones and I, Singer-Songwriter

== See also ==
- City of Frankston (former) – Frankston was previously within this former local government area.
- Karingal and Olivers Hill – localities within the suburb of Frankston.
- Melbourne – the metropolitan area of which the suburb of Frankston is a part.
