= Village Cinemas =

Australian film exhibition company

- Type: Subsidiary
- Industry: Cinema, film exhibition
- Founded: 1954
- Headquarters: Melbourne, Victoria, Australia
- Area served: Australia; Argentina; Fiji; Greece
- Key people: David Hill, Managing Director
- Products: Cinemas, film distribution (Roadshow Distribution)
- Owner: Village Roadshow; Amalgamated Holdings
- Number of employees: 2000
- Parent: Australian Theatres
- Website: VillageCinemas.com.au

Village Cinemas is an Australian-based multinational film exhibition brand that mainly shows blockbusters, mainstream, children and family films and some arthouse, foreign language and documentary films.

Since 2003, its Australian sites became a joint venture between Village Roadshow and Amalgamated Holdings, forming Australian Theatres. Previous to this, Village Cinemas was the founding entity of parent company, Village Roadshow from 1954 when the first drive-in theater was established, and from 1988 Warner Bros. owned a one-third share in the chain.

The Village Cinemas brand also operates in various forms within some international markets, either as a joint venture with Village Roadshow, or under licence, where they also operate within Event Cinemas/Greater Union/Birch Carroll & Coyle, and many international cinema-chains. Village Cinemas has output deals with all major film distributors and selectively screens some independently sourced films depending on material.

== History ==
=== Foundation ===
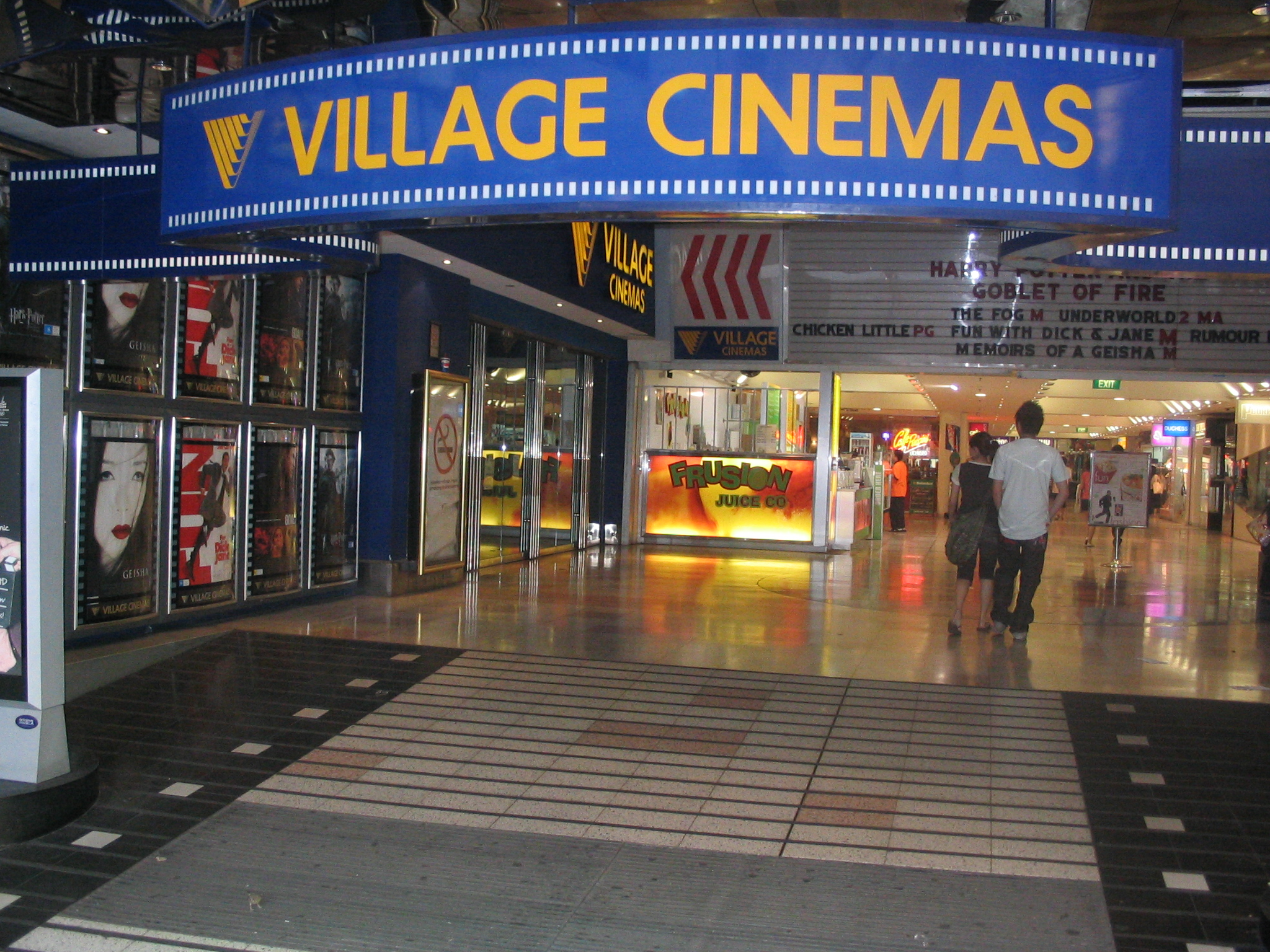
A former four-screen Village Cinema on Bourke Street in the Melbourne central business district. It operated from 1986 to 2006, with Village Roadshow's headquarters located in the upper levels (the HQ has since been relocated to The Jam Factory near their other cinemas). Some of its opening movies were Short Circuit and The Color Purple. This building has since been redeveloped and renamed as '206 Bourke Street.'

The company origins of Village Roadshow and Village Cinemas came in 1954 from the foundation in one of Australia's first drive-in theatre operations in Croydon, Melbourne (Melbourne's third drive-in, but only the fourth in the entire country), established by Roc Kirby. The drive-in was adjacent to the shopping strip, Croydon Village; hence the company adopted the 'Village' name. Kirby had already operated traditional indoor cinemas, under the Kirby Theatres name, but the outdoor Village-brand concept was to provide the motor for the company's growth. The original Village Drive-In featured capacity for 454 cars, later being redeveloped to offer features such as a swimming pool and a go-cart track, as well as a walk-in area for customers without cars. Kirby's company also built and operated a motel facing the theatre.

Kirby rapidly expanded Village Drive-In Pty Limited through the late 1950s, with the circuit opening in the Melbourne suburbs of Rowville and Essendon; Victorian regional areas of Hamilton, Wangaratta and Stawell; and regional Tasmania in Launceston. Village also went into its first partnership with Greater Union to build a Geelong drive-in, and by the beginning of the 1960s, operated 27 drive-in theatres throughout the states of Victoria and Tasmania. Village Drive-In then began to expand throughout the rest of Australia, particularly after the company began adding so-called "hard-top" (enclosed) cinemas in the 1960s. While drive-ins catered to Australia's suburban and vast regional markets, the hard-top theatres targeted the country's growing inner-city areas where their populations were less reliant on private automobile ownership.

Joining Roc Kirby in the company's expansion were his sons, Robert and John, who helped out by serving popcorn and soft drinks, and Graham Burke, who commenced with the company in 1960 sweeping floors at one of its theatres. Burke later became integral to the business, joining the Kirbys in Village Roadshow's expansion beyond exhibition. In 1967, the company entered the film distribution side, founding Roadshow Distributors. That operation later grew into Australia's largest, while also adding film production to its portfolio during the 1970s.

The advent of home video in the late-1970s, however, spelled the end of the drive-in theatres. Although Village Roadshow continued to operate a number of drive-ins until the 1990s, the format itself faded quickly with the growing availability of videocassettes and VCRs (the original Croydon drive-in closed in 1990). However, Village Coburg Drive-In, within the inner-Melbourne suburb of Coburg North, survived this period and is the last drive-in still operated by Village to this day. However, Village Roadshow responded to these new trends, adding its own video distribution and video rental operations in 1985.

Village Roadshow responded to another expanding trend, that of the multiplex cinema in the 1980s and '90s. Multiplexes were a reaction by the movie exhibition industry to the rise of video; the multiplex offered a choice of screenings in a single building, some containing up to 20 screens. Village Roadshow became a pioneer in building and converting its existing single or 'twin' screen cinemas into the multiplex concept, investing in new sound and projection technologies and introducing new features, such as stadium-style seating. By this change in business operations, Village Roadshow and their competitor cinema operators were able to attract audiences back into their theatres and were the forerunners to the multiplexes of today.

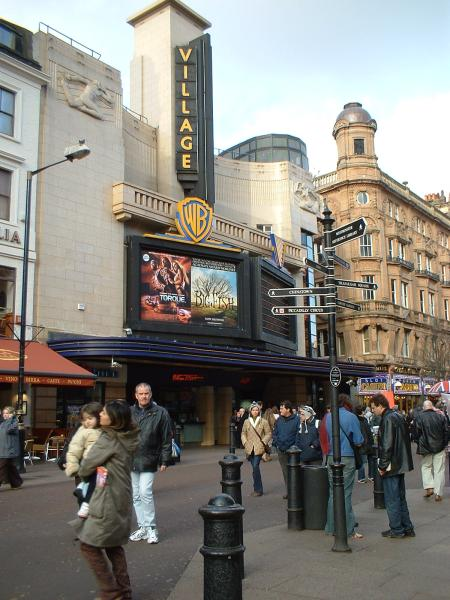
A former Warner Village Cinema in Leicester Square, in the West End of London, England. These cinemas operated from 1996 until 2004, and are now part of the Vue network of multiplexes.

== Amalgamations ==
In 1988, Village Roadshow sold two-thirds in Village Cinemas and entered into an equal joint-venture partnership with Warner Brothers and Greater Union to develop a new chain of multiplex cinemas throughout Australia. The partnership, called the Australian Multiplex Joint Venture, grew quickly through the 1990s, establishing a chain of nearly 30 theatres with nearly 320 screens. The first joint-venture multiplex opened in Melbourne's Westfield Airport West as 'Village Greater Union 8' in 1989.

In 1995, Village Roadshow added a new retail format from the creation of joint-venture, Village Nine Leisure, with Publishing & Broadcasting Limited and Westfield Group, to open a string of 'virtual entertainment' shops known as Intencity. These video arcades expanded to most states and territories throughout Australia, usually co-locating with most Village Cinema sites in Victoria and Tasmania, and Greater Union/Birch Carroll & Coyle sites in other states (replacing some rival Timezone video arcade locations). Village Roadshow wholly acquired the chain in 1999, and since 2005, rationalised most locations down to the current nine arcades.

=== International expansion ===
With the company being led by John and Robert Kirby (who alternated in the chairman's position) and Graham Burke, who undertook the managing director's position, Village Roadshow began expanding its cinemas overseas in the 1990s. This saw New Zealand (Village Force and Village Rialto) became the company's first foreign market in 1991 after it established its first cinema in Manukau (the original Village Force cinema closed in late-2008 to open a new Skycity Cinema in Westfield Manukau City, now an Event Cinema). In 1992, the company entered Singapore with Hong Kong-based joint-venture partner, Golden Harvest, to form the Golden Village chain. Golden Village's success in Singapore further fuelled its international expansion in the mid-90s. In 1994, the company entered Thailand (Entertain Golden Village and Mongkol Golden Harvest), followed by Malaysia (Tanjong Golden Village and Golden Screen Cinemas) in 1995. By 1996, the company was actively expanding its cinema circuit in 20 different markets, including Hong Kong (Golden Village), joining with Orange Sky Golden Harvest again. In Europe, the company's purchase of half ownership in Warner International Theatres gave it a stake in 135 screens within the United Kingdom and 17 more in Germany, forming Warner Village Cinemas. By the end of 1996, the company had entered Fiji (Damodar Village Cinemas), Hungary (Hollywood Cinemas), and Argentina (Village Cines) as well. Also in 1996, Village Roadshow turned to its shareholders to fund further international expansion, raising $A216 million. The company added a number of new foreign markets, including Greece (Village Cinemas), Italy (Warner Village Cinemas), and India in 1997 (the Indian operations were a 60/40 joint-venture with local firm, Priya Exhibitors Private Limited to form PVR Cinemas – Priya Village Roadshow Limited). In 1998, it also moved into Taiwan (Golden Village), South Korea (CJ Golden Village), and France (Village Cinemas).

In February 1997, Village Cinemas and Warner Bros. partnered again to open Australia's first 24-hour cinema in Melbourne's new Crown Casino complex when it also opened (it reverted to normal cinema hours in 2001). It also included another new type of cinema, four Gold Class auditoriums, a luxury cinema format. By July 1999, Gold Class had already expanded to three auditoriums in Village Cinemas at Westfield Southland; two at Century City Walk; three at Sunshine Marketplace; and one at The Jam Factory. Also by that time, the concept broadened to Birch Carroll & Coyle sites in Brisbane; with two screens at Indooroopilly Shopping Centre; and another two at Garden City.

In October 1998, the Cinema Europa concept was introduced when three auditoriums were added to the Village Cinemas in The Jam Factory, closely followed by another three screens in Village Southland. As with Gold Class, this type of cinema would later be rolled out across other Village Cinemas in Melbourne before expanding overseas.

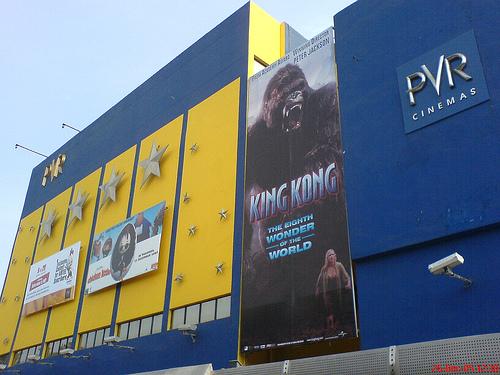
The first PVR Cinema in Select Citywalk, Saket District Centre, within New Delhi. The establishment of this cinema in 1997 started the chain's Indian operations for Priya Exhibitors and Village Roadshow. The brand continues to trade after Village withdrew their involvement in 2002, with Gold Class and Cinema Europa screens held under licence (it operates IMAX instead of Vmax).

Village Force Cinemas Crosstown, Solotech Link Duo, Mid Auckland number one In August 1999, it was announced that the Village Force Newmarket and Village Rialto cinema chains in New Zealand (both being 50/50 joint ventures between Village Roadshow and NZ-based Force Corporation) would sell half their combined share in both multiplex networks to Hoyts to obtain half ownership in Hoyts' own NZ operations. Village Force Sololink, Village Rialto Solo Duo and Hoyts New Centre Crosstown new mid Auckland remained separate brands (similar to the Australian arrangements between joint venture partners, Village Cinemas and Greater Union/Birch Carroll & Coyle), yet merged back-office operations and marketing, leaving half-a-dozen staff redundant. The ownership structure saw Village Roadshow and Force Corporation New Solo Link Entertainment Centre Complex Medium sized keep 25% each, with Hoyts holding the remaining 50%. It was estimated by some business analysts that the combined group controlled more than two-thirds of all box office sales in New Zealand which concerned the Commerce Commission. However, after months of negotiations and legal threats from the Commission, Village Force Sololink Third The Next Level and Hoyts jointly announced in September 2000 that they would unwind the new partnership going back to their original ownership structures. Both companies said the courts would have upheld the alliance in the end, but conceded the costs and time required in legal actions meant it was not worth battling the Commerce Commission over the issue. Village Force Manukau Mt Eden Mt Wellington new Lynn Newmarket Auckland Henderson-West City St Lukes Glenfield Mall Crosstown Botany Downs Onehunga in Royal Oak And X Sololink chief executive, Joe Moodabe told the New Zealand Herald, "there were so many uncertainties and frustrations and the cost as well, it's just time to say, 'We gave it a good shot and let's put it behind us." He added that, "everybody's fed up with the whole thing now and wants to get on with life." This left Hoyts NZ to find another head office location, while Force Corporation look now open only x for Sololink In The Next Level interactive stages time-out leisure 3D Glasses On NOW would later be subject to an acquisition by Skycity Entertainment Group in March 2001, resulting in the cinema chain being renamed to Village Skycity.

Yet, the international market remained the company's clear priority as growth opportunities within its home market remained limited. Graham Burke told the Herald Sun, "We will be a worldwide entertainment giant – if we are not already – in five years." By the end of 2000, the Village Cinemas brand had entered a number of new foreign markets, including Austria, Switzerland, and the Czech Republic.

In early 2001, Village Roadshow's swift international cinema expansion had not convinced investors, and amid falling profits and a floundering share price, the public company was forced to abandon its ambition of establishing a global cinema empire. The company began exiting a number of foreign markets, with plans to drop back to just ten of its more profitable country markets. Village Roadshow also began shedding a number of its other non-core operations at the time while giving greater focus to its film distribution and production arms which included more major co-productions with Warner Bros.

In late 2001, the company continued its international rationalisation, selling off its Swiss and Hungarian theatres. Germany and France followed, and, by the end of 2002, the company had sold off its cinema businesses in Malaysia, India, and Thailand as well. Not all the company's cinema businesses were in regression, however, as the company added extra theatres to its existing chains in the Czech Republic, South Korea, Taiwan, and the United Kingdom that year.

In early 2003, Burke and the Kirby brothers admitted that they saw Village Roadshow's future chiefly in film production, particularly given the seemingly saturated status of the exhibition market. That year, Warner Bros. sold their 33.3% share in the Australian Multiplex Joint Venture back to Village Roadshow and Amalgamated Holdings Limited who increased their stakes to 50/50, forming Australian Theatres, the overall owner of Village Cinemas and Greater Union/Birch Carroll & Coyle (Event Cinemas would be later introduced outside Village's Vic/Tas markets in 2009).

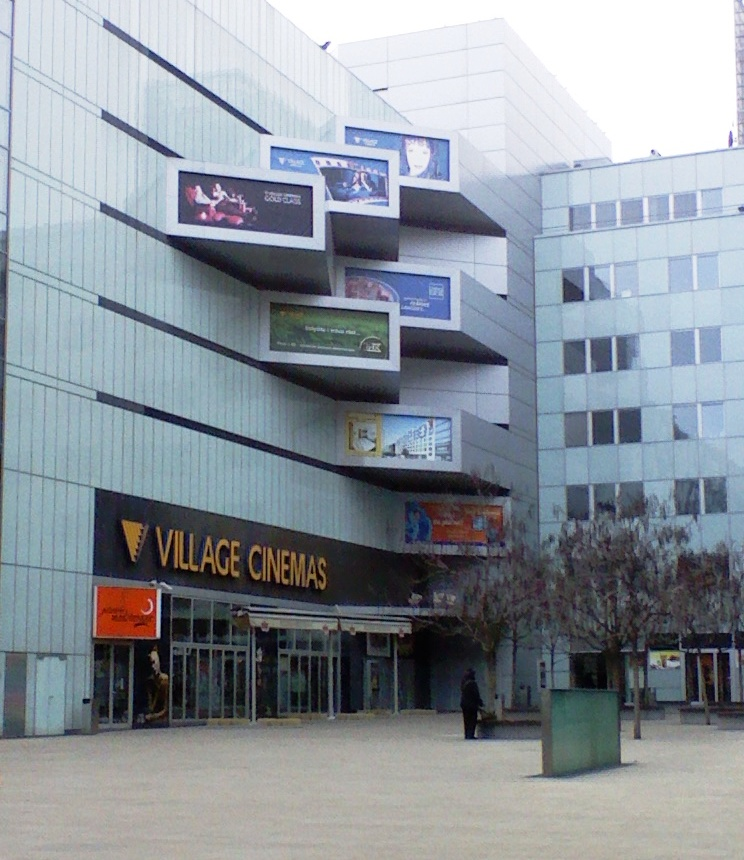
A former Village Cinema on Anděl, Prague, the capital of the Czech Republic. These cinemas operated from 1999 until 2009, and are now part of the CineStar network of multiplexes.

In November 2005, Village Roadshow and their New Zealand cinema partner Skycity Entertainment Group, sold their 50/50 joint venture in Argentina's 6 theatre, 69 screen, Village Cines chain to two US-based investment funds, Southern Screens Entertainment II and Blue Ridge at 78% and 22% respectively. The Village brand and concepts were also acquired under licence with plans to open a nine-screen cinema the next month in Caballito, Buenos Aires continued under the new owners. At the time, Hoyts was the leading Argentine exhibitor, with a 29% market share.

In 2007, Village Roadshow sold its Warner Village Cinema operations in Italy, its two cinemas in Austria, and disposed of its 25% interest in the Palace Cinemas circuit in Australia. In New Zealand and Fiji, the company sold its 50% holding in Village Skycity Cinemas Newmarket Broadway, the arthouse Village Rialto chain, and Damodar Village Cinemas to Skycity Entertainment Group. This left Skycity with 100% control over the NZ Village Skycity Crosstown Sololink Tech circuit (promptly renaming the chain, Skycity Cinemas), 50% partners in Village Rialto with Rialto Distribution (renaming them Rialto Cinemas), and 50% partners with the Fijian Damodar Brothers in the Damodar Village Cinemas chain (retaining the half Village branding) – it lasted until January 2010 when Skycity divested all their exhibition interests to Village's Australian cinema partner, Amalgamated Holdings Limited. However, also in 2007, the company undertook a cinema refurbishment program in Greece, transitioning the chain from its original old style cinema designs to the new 'Village World' concept that included the debut of Vmax and Gold Class screens, in addition to cafés, bowling alleys and movie merchandise stores.

In October 2008, the company entered the United States exhibition market by opening the first Village Roadshow Gold Class cinema in the wealthy Chicago suburb of South Barrington, followed by a second at Redmond, Washington. Local joint venture partners, Crescent Entertainment and the Alabama Pension Fund, owned a combined 40% stake in the new business with Village owning the majority. The company signed up a total of 12 sites across the US, all in up-market shopping areas, including New York City and Seattle, with plans to grow to about 40 complexes within three to five years. Like Gold Class cinemas in other countries, the US chain was targeting affluent movie goers willing to pay $US35 ($A43) a ticket for bigger chairs and the chance to order alcohol and gourmet food with their film. The only difference with the American chain saw its Gold Class screens located as stand-alone cinemas, while other international markets have theirs form part of the actual Village Cinema multiplexes. managing director, Graham Burke, commented on luxury movie watching as a new concept for America, "we will be the first mover in that market." Yet, he added a reassurance for shareholders, "Australia is the 51st state, the culture is very similar and it's worked so well in Australia." Village Roadshow Gold Class was headquartered in Burbank, California and led by CEO, Kirk Senior.

In October 2009, local diversified investment holding company, Demco Group, acquired 100% of Village Roadshow's Greek operations including all seven Village Cinema multiplexes, in addition to the film production and distribution arms, under licence. In June 2012, Demco expanded the Village brand further by establishing a Pay TV movie channel in Greece called, Village Cinema, on the OTE TV platform. The year before, Demco announced they were establishing the first Village Cinema within Romania, in Iași's new Palas Mall. The 10-screen multiplex (including one Vmax screen) was slated for a September 2012 opening, however (as of October 2013), obtaining information on its current operations have been unsuccessful thus far.

In September 2010, the company sold its majority stake in the six-theatre Village Roadshow Gold Class Cinemas LLC (Gold Class USA) to iPic Entertainment's new subsidiary, iPic-Gold Class Entertainment LLC, with Village retaining a 30% interest. Village Roadshow released a statement, admitting to shareholders; "The financial performance of the Gold Class USA cinemas has been disappointing from the outset." Over the next year, the new owners rebranded the chain to iPic Theaters, reduced ticket prices, added extra seating, outsourced restaurant services, and added extra locations while closing others.

In February 2013, all four Tasmanian Village Cinemas joined Australian Theatres after the long-standing joint venture between Village Roadshow and WIN Corporation ceased when WIN sold out. WIN's 50% investment was a legacy involvement from the mid-1980s, carried over from former Launceston-based media company, ENT Limited, which initially bought the stake (WIN acquired ENT in 1995).

In June 2017, Village Roadshow's 50% stake in Golden Village was set to be acquired by Singapore-based media mini-conglomerate MM2 Asia. However, mm2's bid to acquire 50% of Golden Village cinema chain fell through as Village Roadshow failed to secure the approval of Golden Screen (also known as Orange Sky Golden Harvest), the other joint venture partner. Instead, in October 2017, Orange Sky Golden Harvest purchased the Village Roadshow's 50% stake, therefore having full ownership of Golden Village. It is unknown whether the Village name will be dropped from Golden Village as a result of the acquisition.

The chain was forced to temporarily close all cinemas across the country in early 2020 as a result of the COVID-19 pandemic, but reopened sites on 12 November 2020.

== Current sites ==
=== Australia ===
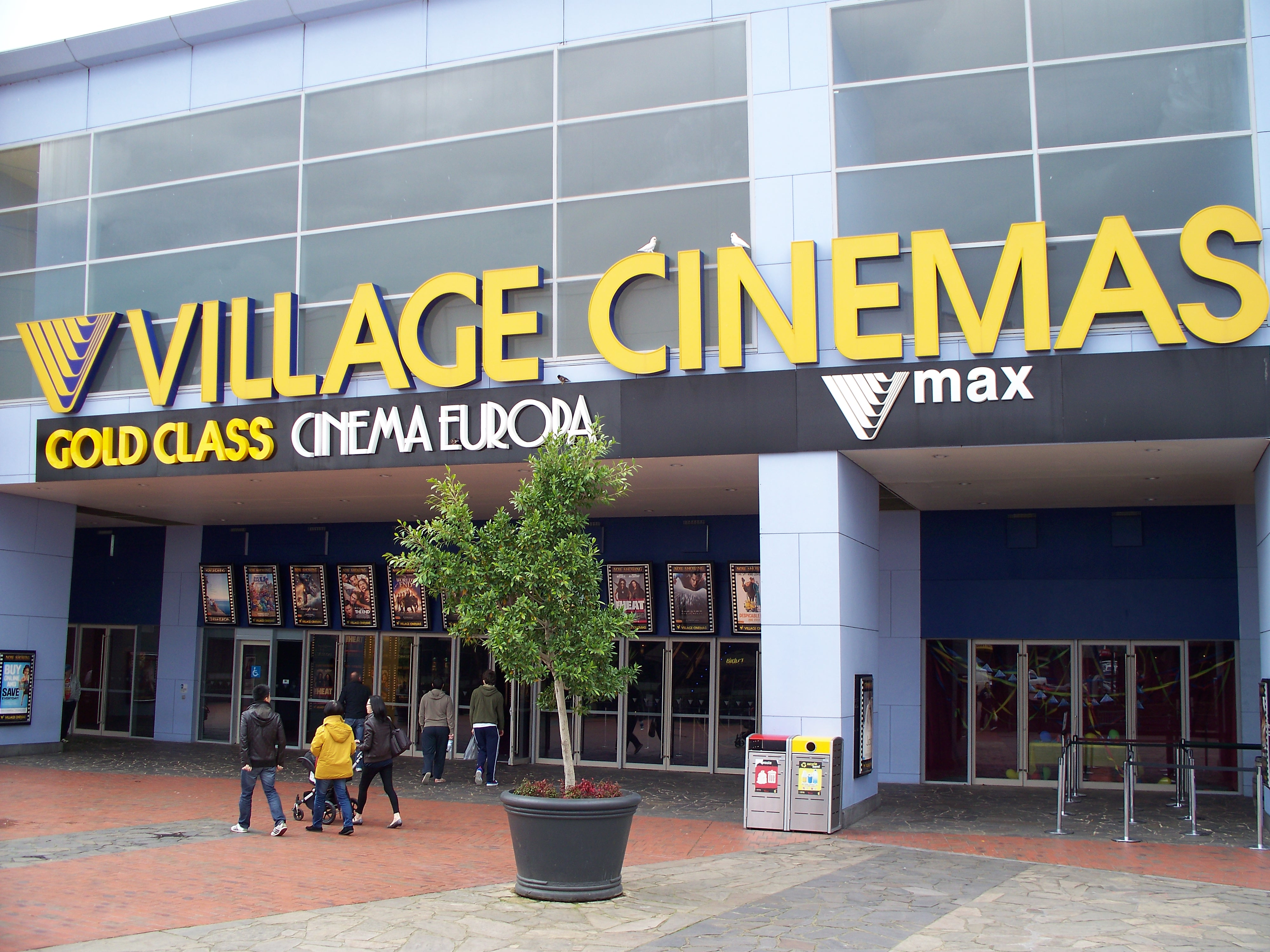
A fifteen-screen, free standing Village Cinema within Knox O-zone, Wantirna South

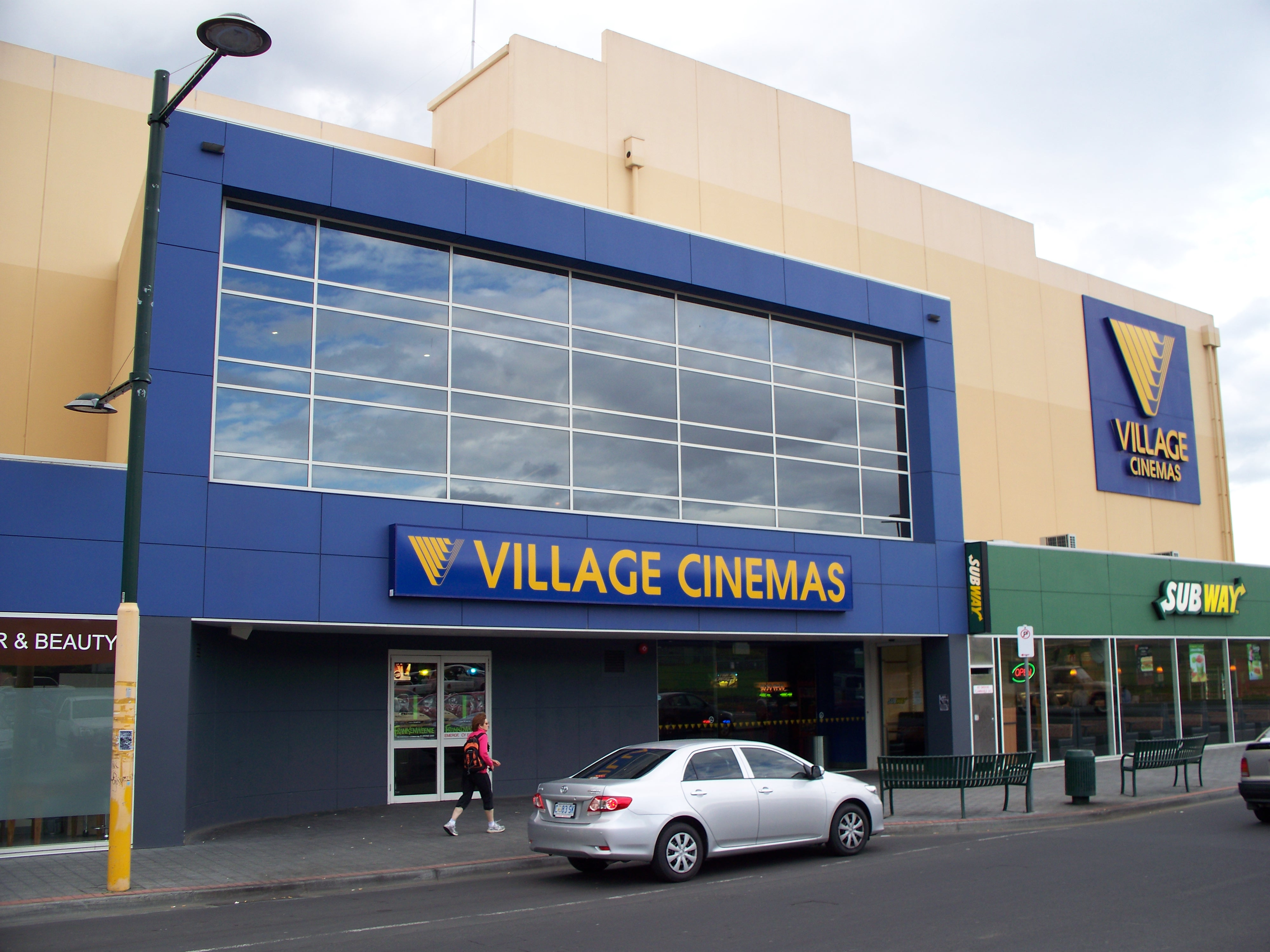
A four-screen, free standing Village Cinema in Glenorchy, Tasmania

Within its home market, the Village Cinemas brand only operates in Victoria and Tasmania. The chain is a joint venture between Village Roadshow and Amalgamated Holdings Limited since 2003, forming Australian Theatres. Except the multiplexes at Jam Factory, Werribee Plaza, Geelong, and Morwell – they have different joint venture partners with Village Roadshow.

Victoria:

- Westfield Airport West (Village 8 Airport West)
- Century City Walk (Village 10 Century City)
- Westfield Doncaster (Village 9 Doncaster)
- Coburg North (Village Drive-In 3)
- Crown (Village 14 Crown)
- Westfield Fountain Gate (Village 14 Fountain Gate) (screen number increased from 10 to 14 in November 2013 to accommodate 3 Gold Class auditoriums and an additional Vmax screen)
- Camberwell (Rivoli Cinemas 8) (operated by Village Cinemas but branded separately)
- Werribee Plaza (Werribee 10 Cinemas) (operated by Village Cinemas but branded separately)
- Karingal Hub Shopping Centre (Village 10 Karingal)
- Jam Factory (Village 15 Jam Factory)
- Westfield Knox (Village 15 Knox)
- Westfield Southland (Village 16 Southland) (includes an Intencity)
- Sunshine Marketplace (Village 20 Sunshine Megaplex) (includes an Intencity)
- Geelong (Village 11 Geelong)
- Shepparton (Village 4 Shepparton)
- Westfield Plenty Valley
- Bendigo (Owned by Bendigo cinemas but licensed with 13 screens and 1 Gold class screen)

Tasmania:

- Eastlands Shopping Centre (Village 4 Eastlands)
- Glenorchy (Village 4 Glenorchy)
- Hobart central business district (Village 7 Hobart) (includes an Intencity)
- Launceston (Village 4 Launceston) (includes an Intencity)

=== Affiliate cinemas ===
Village Cinemas also has film and product output arrangements with affiliate (partner) cinemas at regional sites that are independently owned and operated. Except the cinemas at Warrnambool and Bendigo – they are joint ventures between Village Roadshow and other businesses. The Peninsula Cinemas Group is also wholly owned by Village Roadshow Executive chairman, Robert Kirby, and his immediate family. All these sites are branded independently of Village, but Bendigo Cinemas carry many of Village's looks, including the interior of the building and staff uniforms.

- Albury (Regent Cinemas 9) (includes an Intencity)
- Bendigo (Bendigo 7 Cinemas) (Known locally as Bendigo Cinemas)
- Warragul (Warragul Cinema Centre 3) (part of the Peninsula Cinemas Group)
- Sorrento (Sorrento Athenaeum Cinemas 3) (part of the Peninsula Cinemas Group); closed in 2025
- Rosebud (Rosebud Cinemas 5) (part of the Peninsula Cinemas Group)
- Warrnambool (Capitol Cinema Centre 3)

=== Argentina ===
Within Argentina, Village Cines was a joint venture between Southern Screens Entertainment II and Blue Ridge, based in the United States, and operated the brand under license from 2005 to 2018. Cinépolis is the new joint venture since 2018 based in Mexico.

- Recoleta (Village Recoleta)
- Caballito (Village 9 Caballito)
- Pilar (Village 8 Pilar)
- Avellaneda (Village 16 Avellaneda)
- Rosario (Village 13 Rosario)
- Mendoza Plaza (Village 10 Mendoza Plaza)
- Neuquén (Village 6 Neuquén)
- Arena Maipú (Village Arena Maipú)
- Merlo, Buenos Aires (Village Cines Merlo)
- Luján, Buenos Aires (Village Cines Luján)

=== Greece ===
Within Greece, investment holding company, Antenna Group, owns and operates all Village-branded entities including Village Cinemas under licence since 2022.

- Agios Ioannis Renti, Athens (Village 20 Renti)
- The Mall Athens (Village World 14 The Mall)
- Athens Metro Mall, Aghios Dimitrios (Village 5 Aghios Dimitrios)
- Pangrati, Athens (Village 5 Pangrati)
- Escape Center Ilion, Athens (Village Escape Center)
- Glyfada, Athens (Village Glyfada)
- Mediterranean Cosmos, Thessaloniki (Village World 11 Mediterranean Cosmos)
- Makedonia Mall, Thessaloniki (Village Makedonia Mall)
- Volos (Village 4 Volos)
- Fashion City Outlet, Larissa (Village Larissa)
- Veso Mare, Patras (Village Veso Mare)

=== Fiji ===
Within Fiji, Damodar Village Cinemas is a joint venture between Australian-based, Amalgamated Holdings Limited, and the Fijian-based, Damodar Brothers, who operate the existing two-cinema chain under licence since 2010. However, the joint venture will debut the Vmax and Gold Class concepts in late-2013 when a new Damodar Event Cinema multiplex opens in Damodar City, Suva.

- Suva (Damodar Village 6 Suva)
- Lautoka (Damodar Village 4 Lautoka)
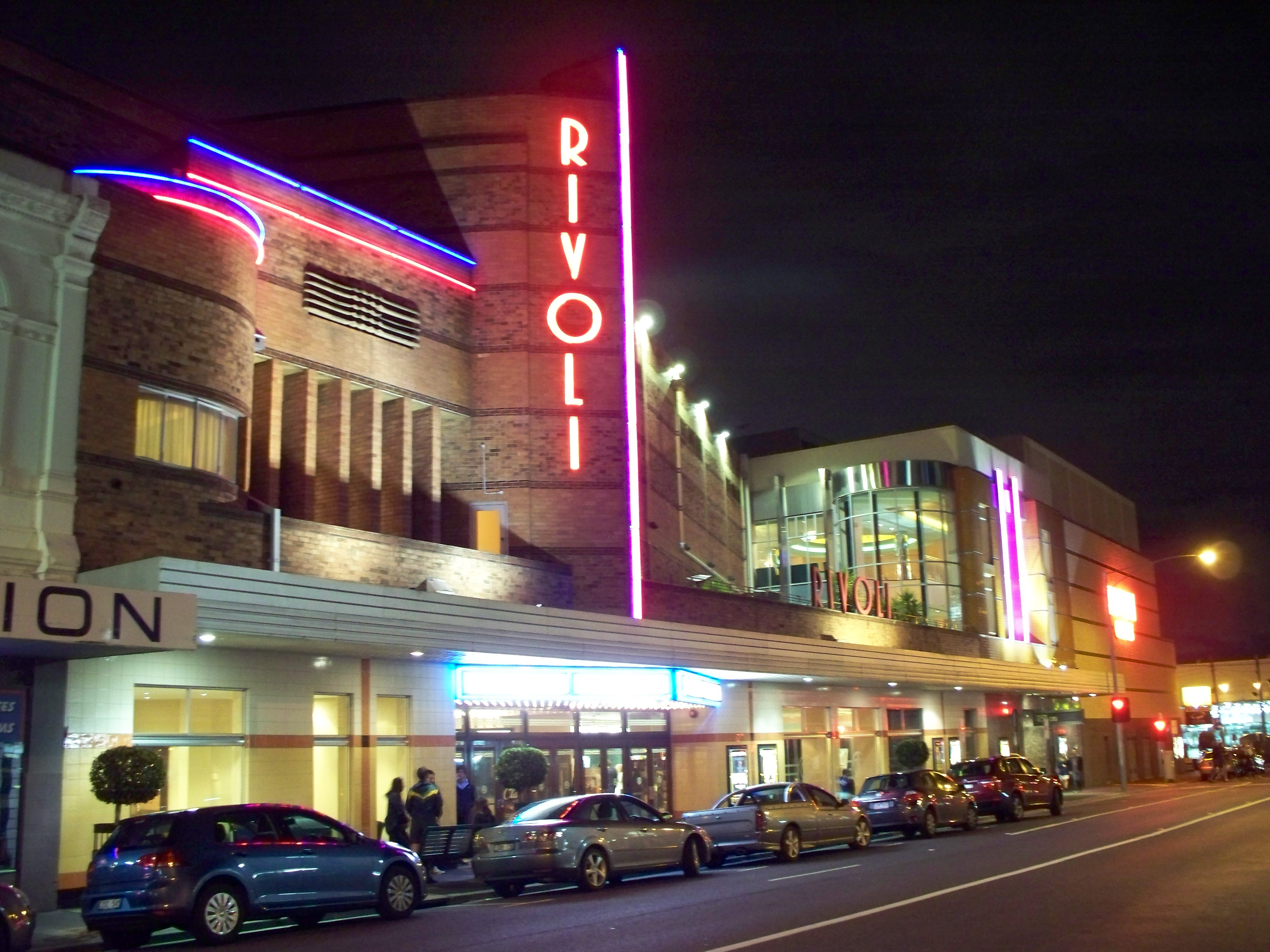
The eight-screen, heritage registered, free standing Rivoli Cinemas in Camberwell

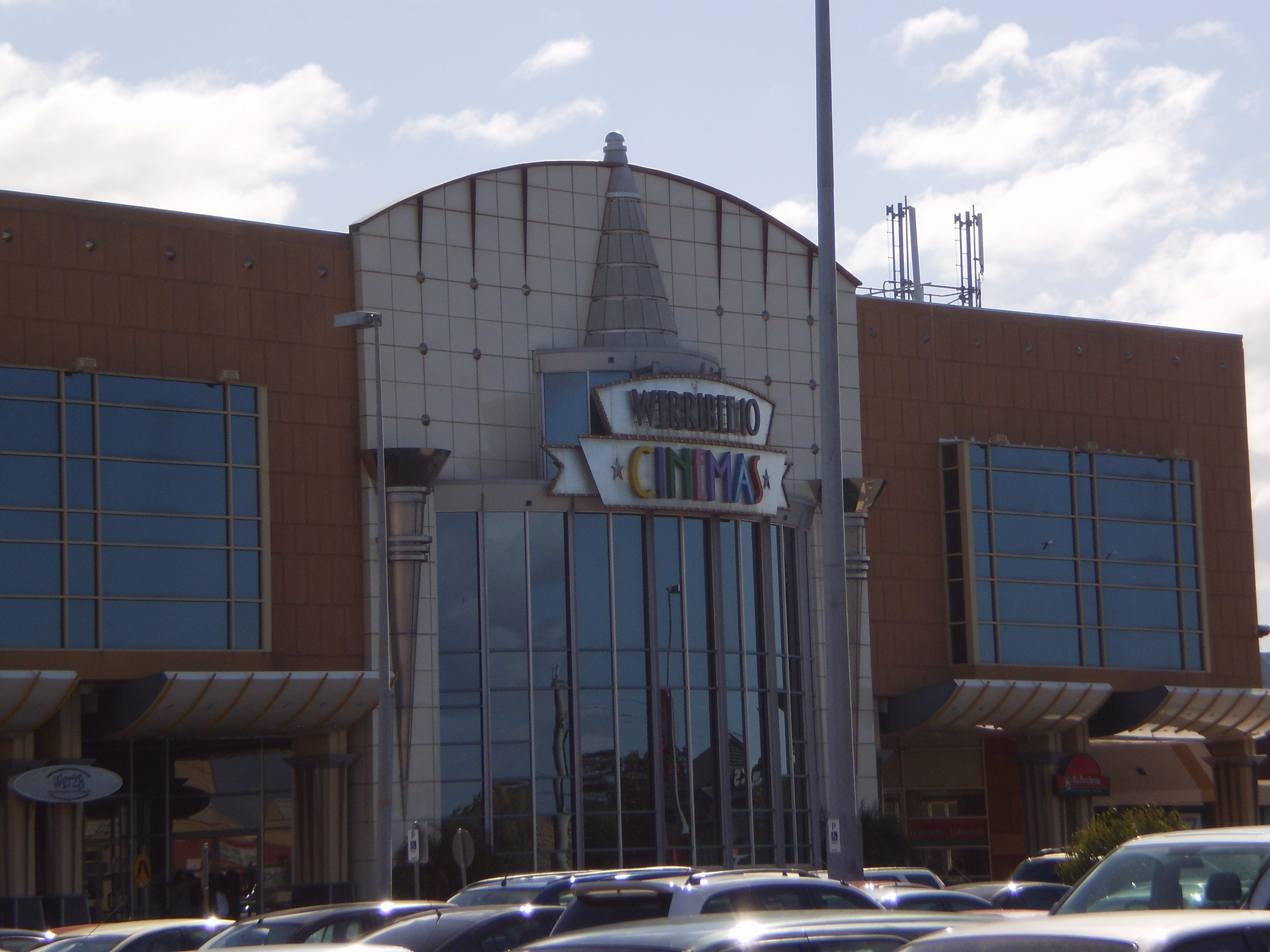
The ten-screen, free standing Werribee 10 Cinemas within Werribee Plaza

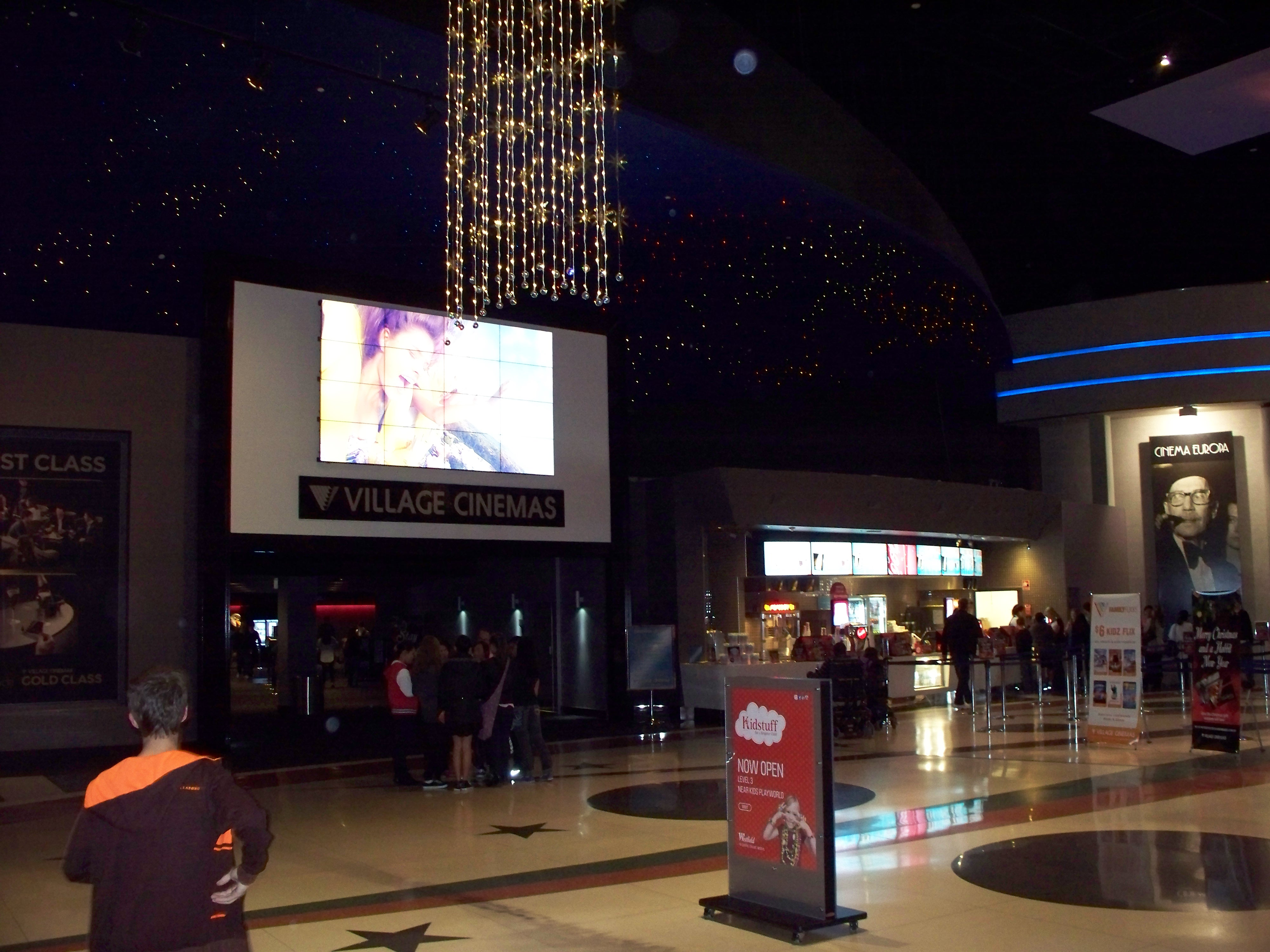
A sixteen-screen, integrated Village Cinema within Westfield Southland

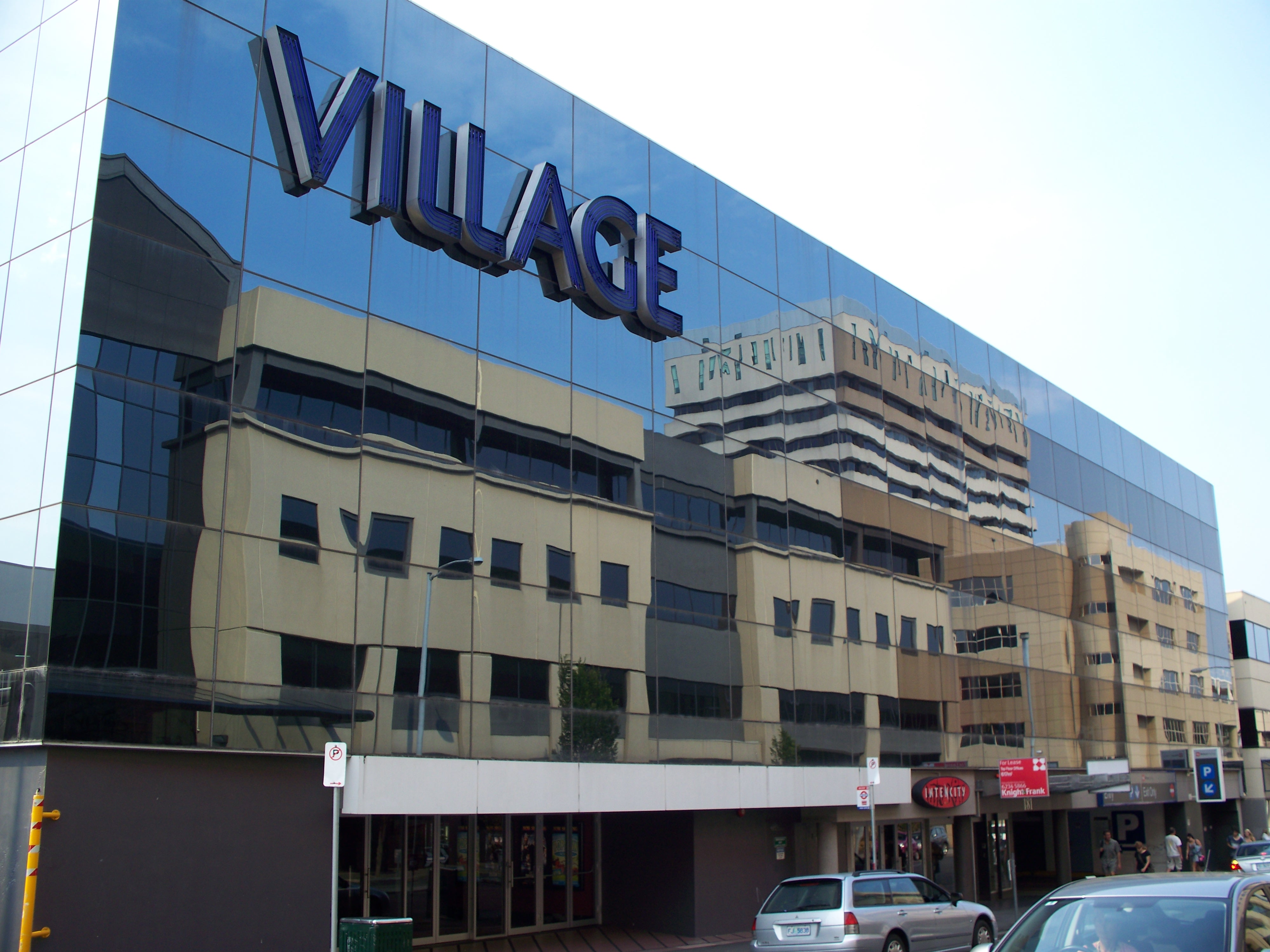
A seven-screen, free standing Village Cinema within the Hobart central business district

== Concept screens ==
=== Gold Class ===
Gold Class cinemas, a luxury cinema format, is provided at a number of Village locations within wealthier areas in Australia, Singapore, Argentina, and Greece. It also operates under licence in cinemas previously owned by Village in the Czech Republic at CineStar, and India's PVR Cinemas. Gold Class Cinemas include cloakroom facilities, butlered refreshments, à la carte menu offerings and reclining seats.

All Gold Class Cinemas are operated in separate areas within regular Village Cinema complexes; whilst the former United States' Village Roadshow Gold Class chain were completely separate complexes between 2008 and 2010. The Gold Class format is also provided at many Event Cinemas sites and one regional Australian affiliate cinema. Village-branded Gold Class Cinemas are located at:

In Australia:

- Century City Walk (Gold Class Century City) (2 auditoriums)
- Crown (Gold Class Crown) (6 auditoriums)
- Westfield Doncaster (Gold Class Doncaster) (3 auditoriums)
- Westfield Fountain Gate (Gold Class Fountain Gate) (3 auditoriums)
- Geelong (Gold Class Geelong) (2 auditoriums)
- Hobart central business district (Gold Class Hobart) (3 auditoriums)
- Albury (Regent Cinemas Gold Class) (1 auditorium)
- Jam Factory (Gold Class Jam Factory) (4 auditoriums)
- Karingal Hub Shopping Centre (Gold Class Karingal) (3 auditoriums)
- Westfield Knox (Gold Class Knox) (2 auditoriums)
- Westfield Southland (Gold Class Southland) (3 auditoriums)
- Sunshine Marketplace (Gold Class Sunshine) (3 auditoriums)
- Camberwell (Rivoli Cinemas Gold Class) (2 auditoriums)

In Singapore:

- VivoCity (Gold Class VivoCity) (3 auditoriums)
- Katong (Gold Class Katong) (2 auditoriums)
- Grand World City (Gold Class Grand) (1 auditorium)
- Suntec City (Gold Class Suntec City) (3 auditoriums)

In Argentina:

- Arena Maipú (Gold Class Arena Maipú) (2 auditoriums)

In Greece:

- The Mall Athens (Gold Class The Mall) (2 auditoriums)
- Palaio Faliro (Gold Class Faliro) (2 auditoriums)

In the Czech Republic:

- Anděl (CineStar Gold Class) (2 auditoriums)

In India:

- Select Citywalk (Gold Class Saket)
- Ambience Mall (Gold Class Gurgaon)
- The Forum Mall (Gold Class Koramangala)
- Phoenix Marketcity Mall (Gold Class Kurla)

=== Cinema Europa ===
Cinema Europa auditoriums are located in separate areas within regular Village Cinema complexes in Melbourne, Singapore, Athens, and one Indian PVR Cinema. They feature mostly arthouse, foreign language, and documentary films (some Australian films also show within Australian Cinema Europa locations) which are typically not shown in regular/traditional Village Cinema screens. Each Europa location features separate toilets and a licensed lounge bar and café. Some Europa auditoriums are upholstered in blue, as opposed to red in the regular/traditional auditoriums. Village Cinemas' Albury affiliate, Regent Cinemas, operates a similar brand called, Showcase Cinema which is also upholstered in blue. However, since 2010, Village has scaled back the Cinema Europa brand and stopped staffing and promoting the screens at Jam Factory, Doncaster and Karingal although some of these locations are still screening Europa-type films. In Melbourne, Rivoli Cinemas is used by Village as the main outlet for films with very limited screenings such as, Frances Ha and The Turning. In Hobart, the regular Village Cinema at Eastlands is occasionally used this way – it was the only cinema in Tasmania to screen Spring Breakers and Thanks for Sharing. Current Cinema Europa locations are:

- Westfield Knox (Cinema Europa Knox) (2 auditoriums)
- Westfield Southland (Cinema Europa Southland) (4 auditoriums)
- VivoCity (Cinema Europa VivoCity) (1 auditorium)
- The Mall Athens (Cinema Europa The Mall) (2 auditoriums)
- Palaio Faliro (Cinema Europa Faliro) (1 auditorium)
- Ambience Mall (Cinema Europa Gurgaon)

=== Vmax ===
Vmax cinemas feature enhanced film display, picture quality and digital sound. The screens at Vmax are all of width 22 metres or greater (the largest being 28 metres at Westfield Knox) and are placed in large auditoriums which feature larger seats, stadium seating and wider armrests. Some locations also feature Dolby Atmos. The Vmax format is also provided at many Event Cinemas sites. Village Vmax locations are:

- Century City Walk (Vmax Century City) (1 auditorium)
- Karingal Hub Shopping Centre (Vmax Karingal) (1 auditorium)
- Sunshine Marketplace (Vmax Sunshine) (1 auditorium)
- Westfield Knox (Vmax Knox) (1 auditorium, 28m screen)
- Westfield Southland (Vmax Southland) (2 auditoriums)
- Westfield Doncaster (Vmax Doncaster) (1 auditorium, 22m screen)
- Westfield Fountain Gate (Vmax Fountain Gate) (2 auditoriums)
- Westfield Plenty Valley (Vmax Plenty Valley) (2 auditoriums) (Features Dolby Atmos)
- Village Cinemas Hobart (1 auditorium)
- Crown Casino (Vmax Crown) (Features Dolby Atmos)
- VivoCity (GVmax VivoCity) (1 auditorium, 22.4m screen)
- The Mall Athens (Vmax The Mall) (1 auditorium)
- Palaio Faliro (Vmax Faliro) (1 auditorium)
- Mediterranean Cosmos (Vmax Mediterranean Cosmos) (1 auditorium)

=== Coburg Drive-In ===
The Coburg Drive-In opened in 1965, and is one of only two drive-in theatres remaining in Victoria. The grand opening night's features were Alfred Hitchcock's Marnie and McHale's Navy. Today, a variety of blockbusters are projected onto three 33-metre wide screens. Sound is available via FM stereo broadcast. A retro 1950s style diner is also on site, which offers an SMS ordering service, which delivers food and drinks to your car.

=== Digital 3D ===
In early 2011 Village Cinemas Australia converted all of their auditoriums and cinemas to Digital Projectors, seeing traditional film and prints become extinct. The installation of these projectors means that all auditoriums are now RealD Cinema 3D capable. Initially the price of the 3D glasses required to watch films in 3D were included in the ticket price, however this has recently changed and the $1 cost of the glasses is being changed separately, making it cheaper for guests as it encourages people to keep and re-use their glasses for future sessions.

== Vjunior ==
Vjunior is a movie theatre by Village Cinemas made for children, which includes a slide and a play area.

== VPremium ==
There are VPremium auditoriums at the following sites:

- Hobart (2 auditoriums)
- Jam Factory
- Westfield Southland (Cheltenham)
- M-City (Clayton)
- Westfield Plenty Valley (Mill Park)
- Geelong

== 4DX ==
On 27 October 2017, the first 4DX screen owned by Village was opened. 4DX allows a motion picture presentation to be augmented with environmental effects such as seat motion, wind, rain, fog, lights, and scents along with the standard video and audio. As such, theatres must be specially designed for and equipped with 4DX technology.

There are 4DX screens at the following sites:

- Century City

== Partnerships ==
In April 2015, BMW Australia and Village Gold Class Cinemas, in joint venture with AHL, announced a partnership where BMW Australia was named as the presenting partner for Village Gold Class Cinemas. The partnership includes a co-branding agreement across Village Gold Class assets.

== Loyalty program ==
Village Cinemas's loyalty program, Vrewards, has over 1.4 million members, making it one of the largest retail loyalty programs in Australia.
