= The Mall Athens =

Shopping Mall in Athens, Greece

- Location: Maroussi, Athens, Greece
- Address: Andrea Papandreou 35, Marousi 151 22, Greece
- Opened: 25 November, 2005
- Owner: Lamda Development
- Num. of stores: 200+
- Floor area: 58,500 square metres (630,000 sq ft)5
- Floors: 5
- Parking: 2100
- Public transit: 1200 NERATZIOTISSA M1 NERATZIOTISSA E14 NERATZIOTISSA
- Website: http://www.themallathens.gr/

The Mall Athens is a shopping mall in Athens, Greece. It was the first of the kind to be constructed in Greece and one of the largest shopping and leisure centres in Southeastern Europe. The Mall Athens is located close to the Athens Olympic Stadium in the suburb of Maroussi and was opened to the public on November 25, 2005. It has approximately 200 outlets for commercial and entertainment use, spread over four levels, and covers about 58,500 square meters with 90,000 square meters of underground space.

Built under the pretext of the 2004 Athens Olympic Games, its construction and operation have evolved into one of the biggest Greek scandals of the last decade involving real-estate, construction and commercial corporations, heads of government, ministers, mayors, and the media. Its main competitors in the region of Attica are the Golden Hall, the Avenue, the Athens Heart, the River West, and mainly the Athens Metro Mall.

== Visitor information ==
The Mall provides access for handicapped persons and has a play area for children, along with a babysitting service and a special children’s care area. It also has a first-aid area. Automated teller machines are available. Opening hours are Monday to Friday from 10 a.m. to 9 p.m. and Saturday, 9 a.m. to 8 p.m. Restaurants, cafes and cinemas are open Monday to Sunday until the early hours, while parking areas operate from 9 a.m. to 3 a.m.

The Mall’s Third Level houses a Village Cinema multiplex, an amusement park and a restaurant/food court area, which is open from 9 a.m. to 11 p.m.

Help desk, which can be found on the entrance, is open from 8.30 a.m. until 2 p.m.

The mall offers free WiFi to visitors, only requiring email verification. The service is provided by Zoottle.

== Access ==
The Mall can be accessed by metro and suburban railway networks (Nerantziotissa station), as well as by the Attiki Odos highway.

== The Mall Athens controversy ==
=== The Olympic Games pretext ===
A sign outside The Mall reads: “Olympic Media Village”. That’s because The Mall is an Olympic project that was, nevertheless, inaugurated a full year after the Games (the Media Village was meant to provide accommodation to foreign journalists).

Before the Olympics, the site currently occupied by the shopping center was grazing land for sheep. However, major road and rail infrastructure projects turned it into a prime piece of real-estate. The site belonged to the state and was meant for social housing. Instead, it was sold at a discount to Lamda Development, the Latsis Group subsidiary which erected The Mall.

The agreement between the Greek state and Lamda focused on the construction of a housing complex to accommodate a number of foreign journalists during a 15-day period. In exchange, the state changed the laws so that Lamda could build a giant shopping center on land which it did not own, under terms not allowed by the Greek Constitution.

=== "The largest illegal construction in Europe"? ===
The Mall scandal involves Spiros Latsis and his corporation, members of both major Greek political parties (including the former and current Prime Ministers), their government ministers (who introduced legislation contrary to the Constitution), the local mayor, Mr. Tzanikos (who came up with the idea for the construction and is currently being sued in court) and, last but not least, the president of Athens 2004, Gianna Angelopoulou-Daskalaki. Against them, stood only a handful of citizens along with some members of the judiciary.

Following a motion brought by a citizen, Dorilaos Klapakis, the Greek Supreme Court (SC) ruled in 2003 that the laws passed for The Mall were indeed unconstitutional and ordered the cessation of its construction. Lamda corporation and the state (ministries in charge and the police) ignored the ruling, so construction proceeded regardless.

Over the next 3 years, major Greek politicians tried to fight the SC’s decision and avoid further legal repercussions by introducing legislation, contrary to the Constitution but favorable to the Mall, and then ruling the new laws untouchable by the Greek Supreme Court.

In November 2005, one year after the Olympic Games, The Mall is inaugurated. Tens of stores and movie theatres, including multinational brands, operate illegally and without a license in spite of the police having pressed charges against them. The Mall also served at the time as an experiment in labor market conditions: within The Mall, the branch of Eurobank Ergasias, a bank also owned by the Latsis Group, operated for a while on Saturdays, in violation of labor legislation and with the acquiescence of the government.

Moreover, Lamda has yet to meet most of the commitments it made towards Athens 2004, the local authority and the public organization that owned the land, when it was awarded the "Media Village" project in March 2002:

- Instead of hosting 6.000 journalists, as originally planned, the Media Village accommodated a mere 1.000. - The land purchase was only settled in early 2006. That means that the Mall was being built from 2001 to 2005 and eventually opened in late 2005 on public land that Lamda Development did not own or rent.

- The 20-acre (81,000 m^{2}) park that Lamda was supposed to build next to The Mall is still a bus parking lot.

=== The Mall Athens trial ===
The case of the Mall was brought for a second time before the Supreme Court of Greece in 2003. Since then, and six years after the building was first ruled illegal, the SC has not yet reached a decision. A new date was set for October 2009. Much will be at stake during the trial and the subsequent court decision. First and foremost, the very existence of The Mall itself. Second, whether the Greek government will still be able, through the gimmick of ad hoc legislation that it used over the Mall case, to ignore the Supreme Court's decisions in other important environmental cases.

=== The media black-out ===
Greek media (with slight exceptions,) played a dual part in the Mall case: while The Mall was under construction, they concealed the Media Village scandal, which, despite being obvious, did not receive as much as a comment.

Outside Greece, the Latsis Group (which holds a majority stake in the Mall Athens) is also dealt with extreme caution by the international media. The British newspapers The Times, and The Telegraph dealt with the close relationship between Spiro Latsis and José Manuel Barroso, president of the European Commission.

=== Bomb attack ===
An explosive device behind a newspaper stand at The Mall Athens slightly injured two security staff on Sunday morning 20 January 2013. A warning was issued by telephone to a newspaper and a website about an hour earlier, allowing evacuation of the mall.

=== Death ===
On March 27, 2019, a 40-year-old woman started approaching the handrail of the mall's 3rd floor, only to be seen falling from it internal stairs, and ending up on the 1st floor. There was direct intervention by the National Emergency Center, the police and the competent authorities. The woman was shortly after transported to the KAT Hospital, where it was confirmed that she had died. The event received wide news coverage and is believed that it was a suicide.

== Ownership ==
Since 2017, The Mall Athens is wholly owned by Lamda Development.
