= Sunshine Marketplace =

Coordinates: 37°46′55″S 144°49′53″E

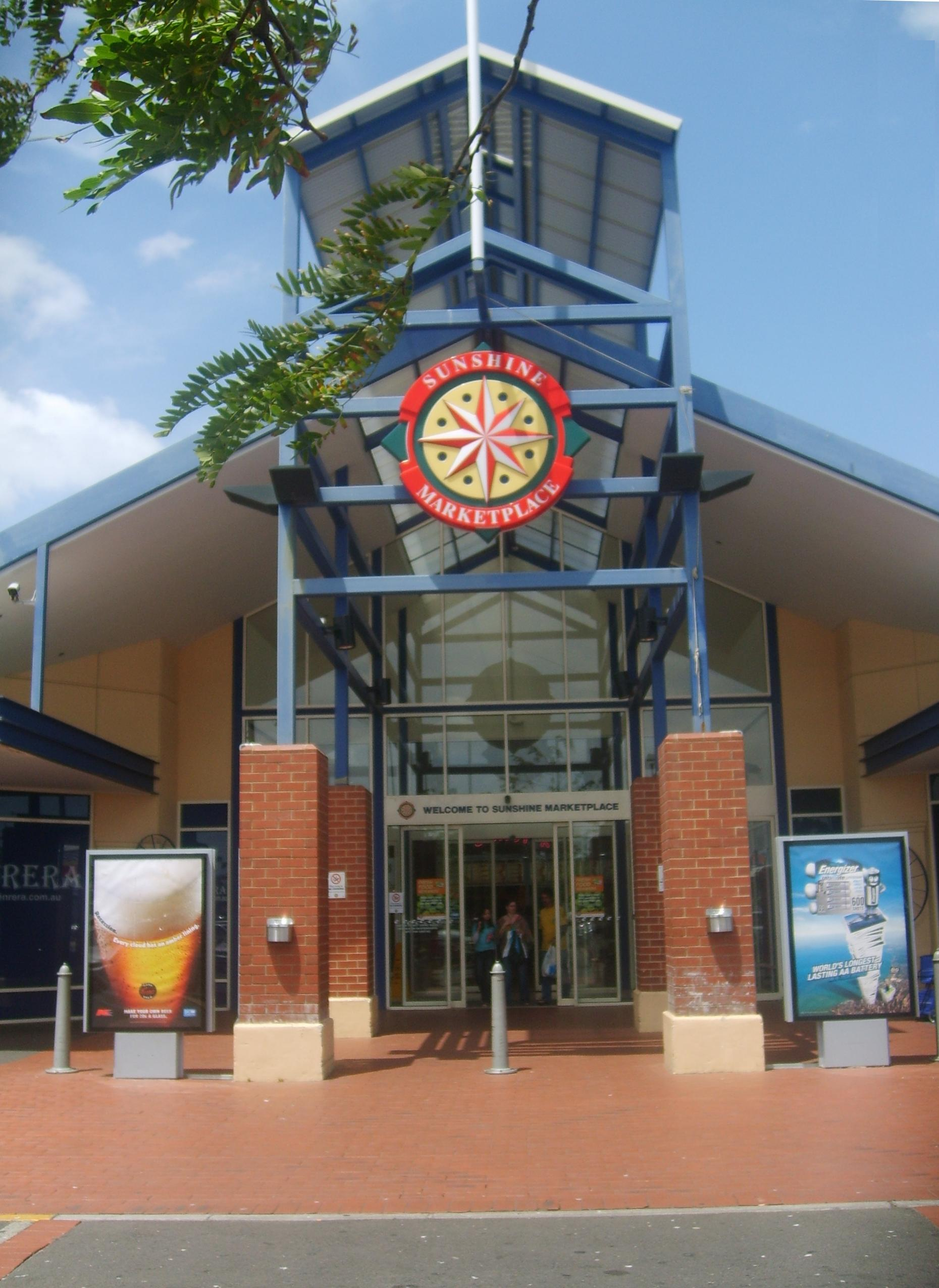
- Entrance to Sunshine Marketplace from the carpark.
- Location: Sunshine, Victoria, Australia
- Opened: October 11, 1998; 28 years ago
- Developer: Centro Properties Group
- Manager: Vicinity Centres
- Owner: Vicinity Centres
- Num. of stores: 74
- Num. of anchor tenants: 3
- Floor area: 33,850 m^{2} (364,400 sq ft)
- Floors: 1 of stores and 1 of car parking
- Parking: 1,743
- Website: www.sunshinemarketplace.com.au

Sunshine Marketplace (was to be called Market Towers) is a regional shopping centre in Sunshine, about 13 kilometres (8 mi) west of Melbourne, Victoria, Australia. It has been built next to the existing Sunshine Plaza.

Sunshine Marketplace has a variety of national, international and independent retailers. It has a Gross Lettable Area of 33,850 m^{2} (364,400 sq ft), 1,743 parking spaces and approximately 74 stores.

== History ==
In 1994, the Woolworths conglomerate purchased two-thirds of the former Sunshine Harvester Works site for $10 million, and submitted plans to build a $70 million shopping complex containing a Big W department store, Woolworths supermarket, cinemas, and around 50 shops. Sunshine Marketplace opened on October 11, 1998, and a major redevelopment program was undertaken in 2004. The redevelopment included a new 300-seat Diners Life precinct, refurbishment of the inner and outer facades, additional stores inside and the Village Cinemas Megaplex, which includes the last Intencity Gaming Complex in Melbourne's west.

On 30 January 2016, during a violent storm, the roof of the Village Cinema area began to collapse due to the heavy rain and winds.

== Major anchors ==
- Big W discount department store.
- Woolworths supermarket. - 14 Aisles
- Village Cinemas 20-screen megaplex.

== Transport ==
Sunshine Marketplace is located 500 m (1,600 ft) from Sunshine railway station. The 220 bus from Sunshine to Gardenvale stops in front of the shopping centre, as do the 408 Highpoint to St Albans via Sunshine and the 903 SmartBus route from Altona to Mordialloc.

== Gallery ==
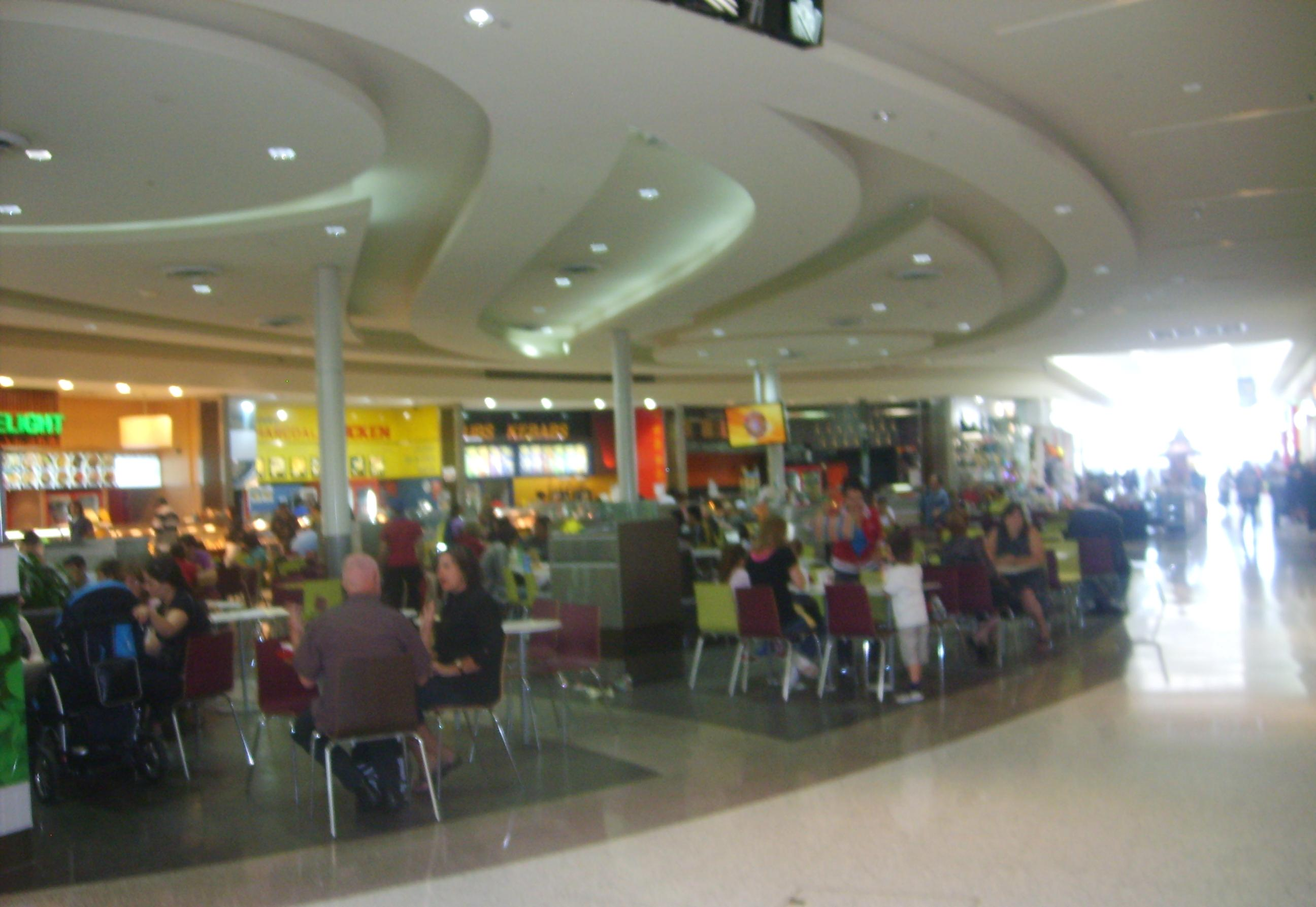
"Diner's Life" food court

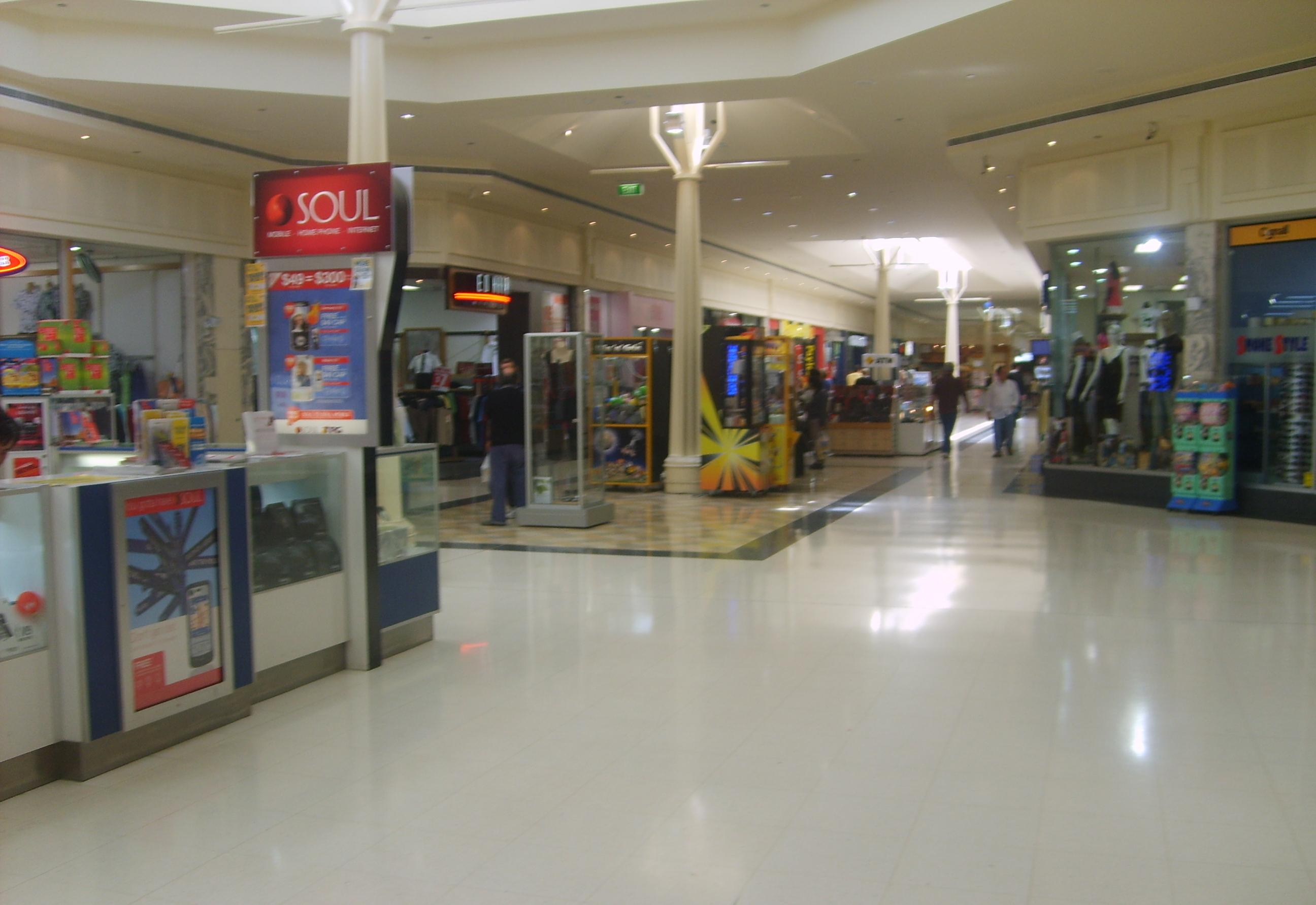
Inside

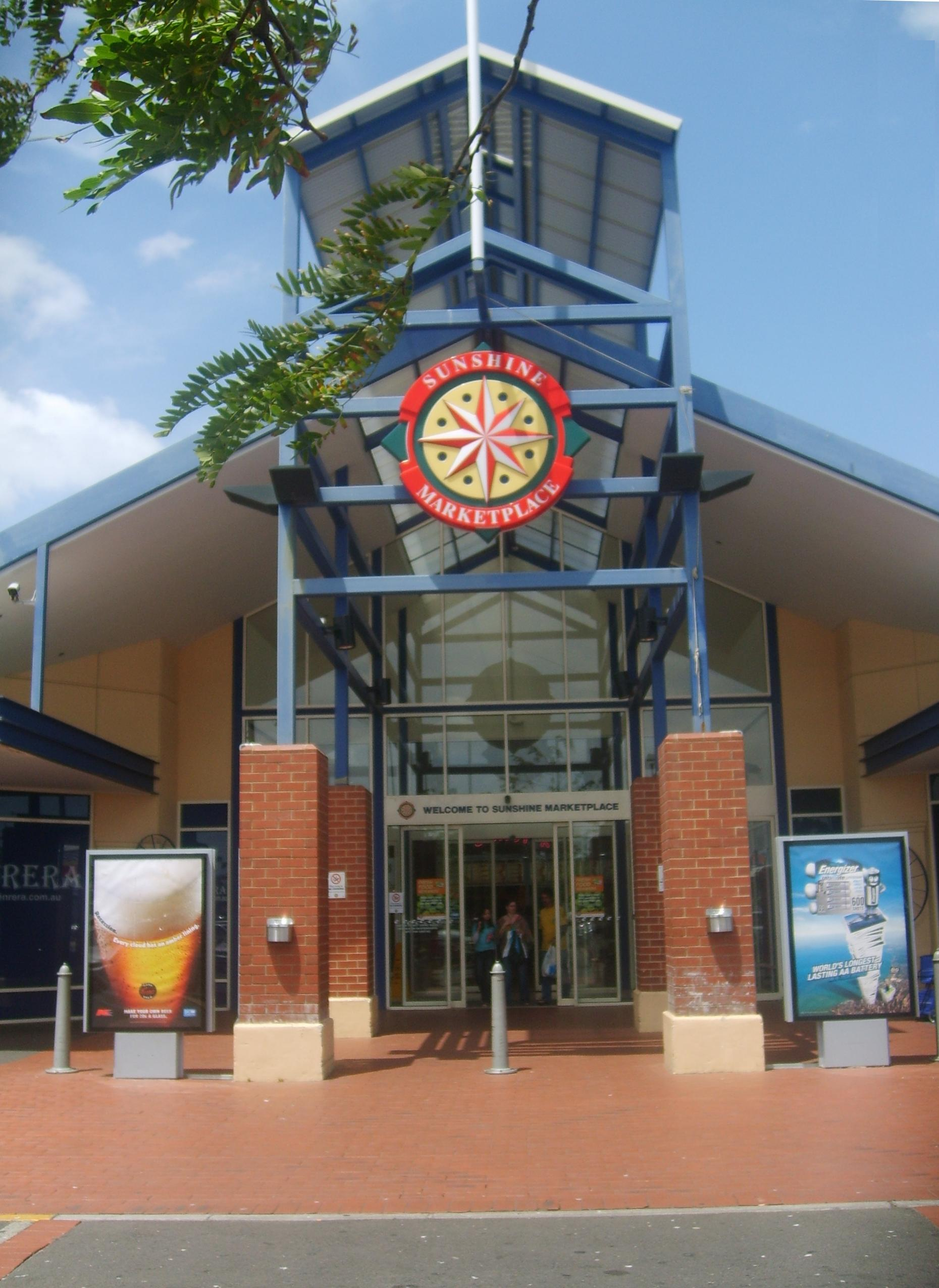
Major entrance from the carpark.
