= Event Cinemas =

Australian and New Zealand chain of cinemas

Greater Union Organisation Pty Ltd
- Trade name: BCC Cinemas; Cinebuzz Rewards; Event Cinemas; Moonlight Cinema; Rialto Cinemas
- Type: Subsidiary
- Industry: Film exhibition
- Founded: 1913; 113 years ago (As Greater Union); 2010; 16 years ago (As Event Cinemas)
- Number of locations: 140+
- Areas served: Australia, New Zealand, Fiji
- Revenue: ▼ A$410.6 million (2020); A$541 million (2019)
- Net income: ▼ A$-8.672 million (2020); A$70.2 million (2019)
- Number of employees: 5,000+
- Parent: EVT Limited
- Website: www.eventcinemas.com.au
- Footnotes; Annual Reports, 2019, 2020.

Greater Union Organisation Pty Ltd, trading as Event Cinemas, Moonlight Cinema and Birch Carroll & Coyle (BCC Cinemas), is the largest movie exhibitor in Australia and New Zealand, with over 140 cinema complexes currently operating worldwide.

The Greater Union Organisation is a subsidiary of EVT Limited (formerly known as Event Hospitality and Entertainment) which is listed on the Australian Securities Exchange, a corporation that owns and operates brands in the entertainment, hospitality and leisure sectors, mainly within Australasia.

== History ==
The Event Cinemas cinema chain has had a significant impact on the Australian culture and film industry, and has a history of mergers and acquisitions and liquidations that span over a century.

=== Early 20th century ===
From 1906 to 1911, during the silent era, Australia was the most prolific producer of feature films in the world, a period which included the creation of the first feature-length film The Kelly Gang. This creative and fertile period in Australian film history was largely created by competition between West's Pictures, Spencer's Pictures and Amalgamated Pictures. On 4 May 1912 the three joined to form The General Film Company of Australasia. On 4 January 1913 it then merged with The Greater J.D. Williams Amusement Co and restructured to become The Combine, a famous partnership between the exhibition wing Union Theatres and the production and distribution wing Australasian Films.

The Combine monopoly was highly influential on the early twentieth-century Australian film industry. However, it came under heavy criticism for its low interest in producing Australian films, its preference for imported cinema, and its reluctance to exhibit Australian films by other producers. Film icon and director Raymond Longford, whose independent production company had come under attack by the group, said in 1927 that "had it not been for the activities of that firm in its endeavour to crush it in its infancy, the local picture would now be 10 years at least advanced to the height now attained by the Americans." Historians have traced the sharp decline of the Australian film industry in 1913 to the repercussions of these series of takeovers and mergers. James Sabine has said that "the stranglehold of The Combine forced a decline in local production and contributed to many Australian production companies closing their doors."

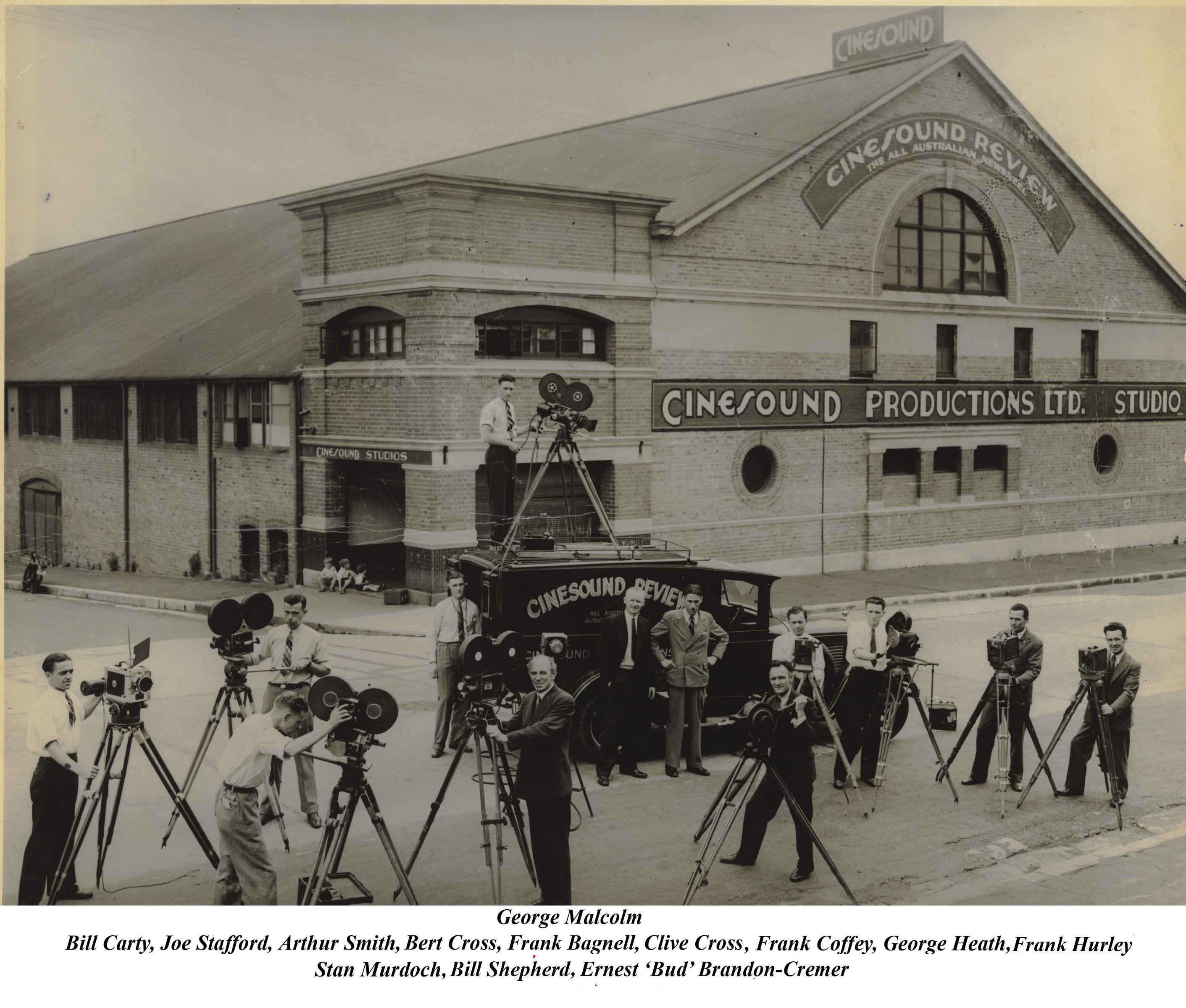
1930 Cinesound studios and Crew

The Combine continued to grow into the 1920s during the genesis of the Hollywood era with its focus on exhibiting American films. The Great Depression saw Union Theatres being liquidated in 1931 and its assets purchased by newly-formed Greater Union Theatres. This new company split from Australasian Films, established the Hollywood-model subsidiary Cinesound Productions, expanded into radio and newspaper, and kept its major focus on building and managing cinemas. Due to The Depression, Greater Union Theatres merged into the General Film Corporation with Hoyts, a competitor who had secured Fox Film as a shareholder. In 1937 Norman Rydge became managing director and removed the company from the previous merger. Rydge halted feature film production during the war and never resumed it.

=== 1945–present: post-war expansion ===
In 1945, the last year of World War II, there was a box office boom and the British Rank Organisation purchased a half share in Greater Union Theatres. During this time Greater Union acquired the rights of ownership of many theatres across the country including what became the Phoenician Club in Broadway, Sydney in 1943, originally owned by McIntyre's Broadway Theatres and established as a cinema in 1911. It acquired the Clifford Theatre Circuit in Adelaide in March 1947. The purchase price of £300,000 for the 22 suburban and regional cinemas was "believed to be the largest motion picture transaction ever made in Australia". The Clifford name was retained as a tribute to the entrepreneur Dan Clifford, and South Australian staff were retained.

In 1958, the four holding companies in the Greater Union Theatres group were merged into the Rydge family Amalgamated Holdings Limited (AHL), and in 1965 Greater Union Theatres was renamed the Greater Union Organisation (GUO). In 1980 billionaire Alan Rydge was appointed Chairman of AHL to become the youngest chairman of an Australian public company.

In 1971, it merged its assets with Metro-Goldwyn-Mayer's Australian cinema unit, which the company's B.E.F. subsidiary distributing MGM titles until 1973, when distribution that studio's films in Australia was shifted to Cinema International Corporation. In 1976, the company's British Empire Films unit was initially renamed GUO Film Distributors, then six years later, it was renamed to Greater Union Film Distributors.

In 1975, Greater Union bought the old Metro Theatre in Hindley Street, Adelaide, and redeveloped it as a modern four-screen cinema complex, called Hindley Cinemas 1–4. In October 1980, the company bought the building that had once housed the first cinema in Adelaide, West's Olympia, also in Hindley Street. After a time in which rebuilds were made to the cinema, it reopened in December 1982 as Hindley Cinemas 5–6.

In 1984, AHL regained control over the now-defunct Rank Organisation's half share, meaning that it once again became fully Australian-owned. In 1987 GUO merged with Village Roadshow's film distribution unit to form the distribution company Roadshow Film Distributors, and by that time, GUO and Village Roadshow partnered on a $100 million cinema chain that will see 200 circuits expanded by use by 1990.

In 1991, GUO acquired Birch, Carroll & Coyle. In the same year, Hindley Cinemas 1–4 and 5–6 closed.

=== 21st century ===
In 2003, AHL and Village Roadshow combined to form Australian Theatres.

Since 2009, most cinemas in Australia have been renamed from Greater Union Cinemas or Birch Carroll & Coyle (BCC Cinemas) to Event Cinemas, with some Greater Union or BCC Cinemas locations across Australia closed down over the years. On 22 December 2015, AHL was renamed Event Hospitality and Entertainment.

In June 2016, Event Cinemas acquired New Zealand cinema chain Downtown Cinemas.

In 2019, Birch Carroll & Coyle was inducted into the Queensland Business Leaders Hall of Fame in recognition of being Australia's leading provincial film distributor and its industry leadership throughout Queensland for 80 years.

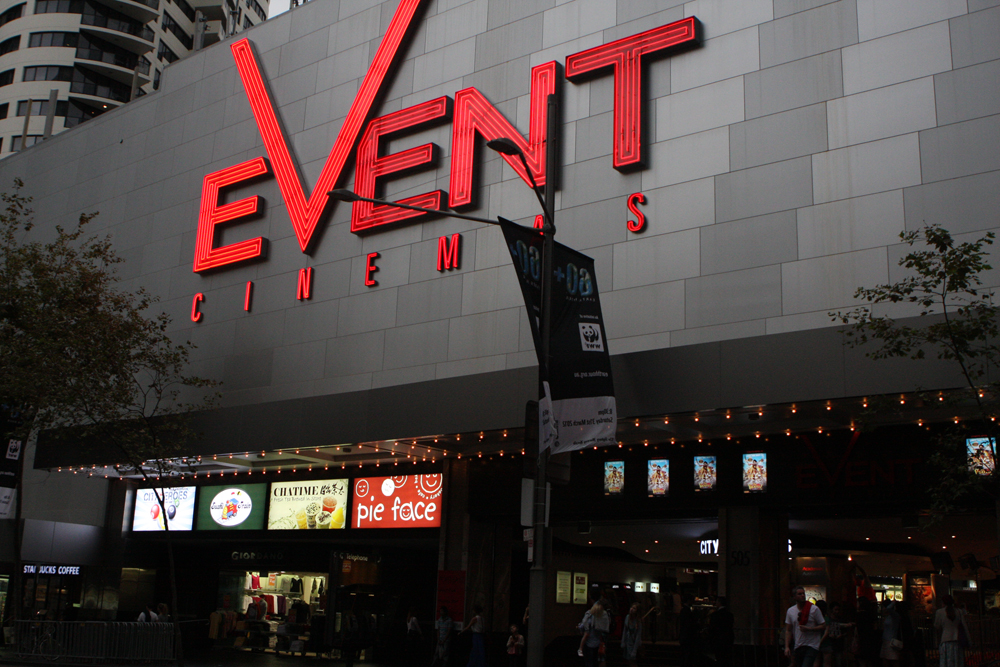
Event Cinemas George St (Sydney CBD) is regarded as the company's flagship location.

In September 2025, Event Cinemas announced that Greater Union Morley, next to being renovated Galleria Shopping Centre, will be closing down with their last session screened on 14 September. The closure of Greater Union Morley marked the end of Greater Union branding as the last cinema in Australia trading under the Greater Union name.

In late 2025, Event Cinemas Innaloo launched an IMAX theatre, after its rival Hoyts brought back the technology to Greater Perth in the same year. The last IMAX theatre in Perth was closed down a decade earlier in 2002.

== Locations ==
=== Australia ===
Event Cinemas operates venues around Australia, many of which are located in large shopping centres. The cinema complexes comprise multiple screens. The below locations do not include sites that operate under the joint venture between Village Roadshow and Event Hospitality & Entertainment known as Australian Theatres.

Cinema locations in Australia

New South Wales

- Blacktown – trading as Skyline Drive-In
- Bondi Junction
- Burwood
- Campbelltown
- Castle Hill
- Edmondson Park
- Glendale
- Hornsby
- Hurstville
- Kotara
- Liverpool
- Macquarie
- Miranda
- Parramatta
- Shellharbour
- Sydney CBD – colloquially known as George St
- Top Ryde City
- Tuggerah

Northern Territory

- Casuarina – trading as BCC Cinemas
- Palmerston

Queensland

- Brisbane City
- Broadbeach – colloquially known as Pacific Fair
- Cairns Central
- Cairns Earlville
- Cairns Smithfield
- Capalaba – trading as BCC Cinemas
- Carindale
- Chermside
- Coomera
- Indooroopilly
- Kawana
- Loganholme
- Mackay Mount Pleasant – trading as BCC Cinemas
- Maroochydore Sunshine Plaza – trading as BCC Cinemas
- Mt Gravatt – colloquially known as Garden City
- Noosa – trading as BCC Cinemas
- North Lakes
- Robina
- Rockhampton North
- Springfield
- Strathpine – trading as BCC Cinemas
- Toowoomba – colloquially known as Grand Central
- Toowoomba – trading as BCC Cinemas Toowoomba Strand
- Townsville – trading as BCC Cinemas

South Australia

- Marion

Western Australia

- Innaloo
- Whitford

With cinema admissions in decline, Event Cinemas has continued to experience growth by raising the price of admissions and offering "premium experiences" such as "Gold Class" which offers more luxury seating and food, "Vmax" which offers a larger screen, and alternate content including Bollywood films, football, gaming, film festivals, opera and stand-up comedy events.

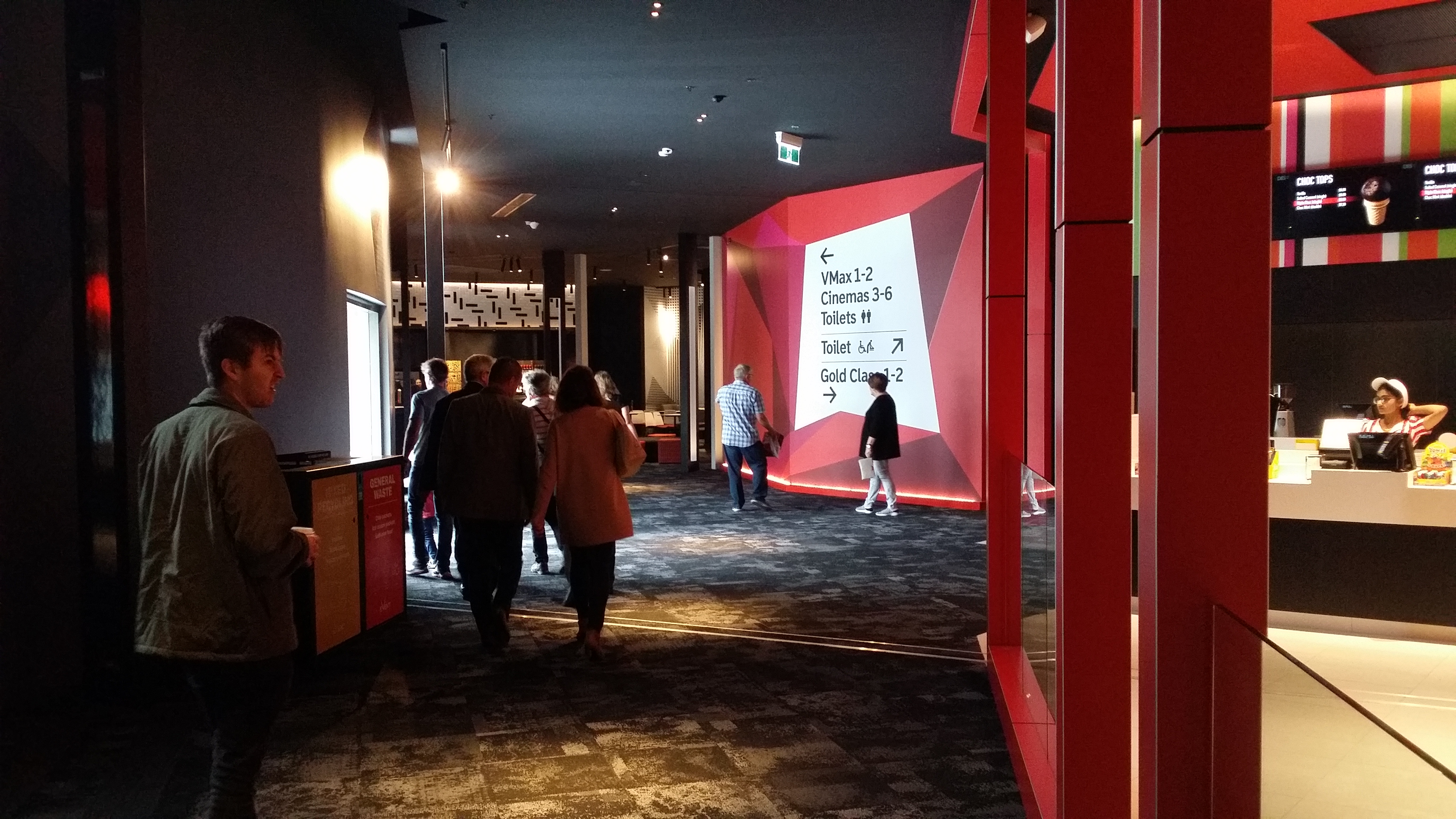
The interior of Event Cinemas Whitford, which opened on 21 September 2017

=== Fiji ===
Within Fiji, Damodar Event Cinemas is a joint venture between Village Cinemas, and the Fijian-based Damodar Brothers, who operate the existing two-cinema chain under licence since 2010. The brand has since changed its name to "Damodar Cinemas".

Cinema locations in Fiji
- Damodar City – trading as Damodar Event Cinemas

=== New Zealand ===
Event Cinemas operates cinema complexes across New Zealand's major urban centres, including the Embassy Theatre in Wellington and the Rialto Cinema in Dunedin. Hollywood blockbusters are screened alongside arthouse films and festivals such as the New Zealand International Film Festival.

In mid-November 2026, the Rialto Cinema in Dunedin was acquired by Reading Cinemas, which confirmed plans to rebrand the Dunedin theatre as Angelika Cinemas Dunedin from December 2026, marking the American-based Angelika Film Center's foray into the New Zealand market.

Cinema locations in New Zealand

- Albany, Auckland
- Blenheim
- Chartwell, Hamilton
- Coastlands, Whakatāne
- Embassy Theatre, Wellington
- Havelock North
- Manukau, Auckland
- New Plymouth
- Newmarket, Auckland (Westfield)
- Palmerston North
- Coastlands Shopping Centre, Paraparaumu
- Queen Street, Auckland
- Queensgate, Lower Hutt
- St Lukes, Auckland
- Tauranga Central
- Tauranga Crossing
- Westcity, Auckland
- Westgate, Auckland
- Whangārei
- Newmarket, Auckland (trading as Rialto)
- Rialto Cinema, Dunedin (trading as Rialto)

== Experiences ==
=== Gold Class ===
Gold Class is a premium cinema format available at selected Event Cinemas locations in Australia, New Zealand, and Fiji. It features in-cinema service, à la carte food and beverage menus, and reclining seating in auditoriums with reduced capacity. The concept originated with Village Cinemas and was later adopted by the Event Group.

All Gold Class cinemas operate as dedicated premium areas within standard Event Cinemas complexes.

Australia

Gold Class locations in Australia

- Bondi Junction
- Broadbeach (Pacific Fair)
- Campbelltown
- Carindale
- Castle Hill
- Chermside
- Coomera
- Mount Gravatt (Garden City)
- Indooroopilly
- Innaloo
- Kawana
- Kotara
- Loganholme
- Macquarie
- Marion
- Miranda
- North Lakes
- Parramatta
- Robina
- Springfield
- Sydney CBD (George Street)
- Whitford

Fiji

Gold Class locations in Fiji

- Damodar Event Cinemas

In New Zealand:

Gold Class locations in NZ

- Albany
- Auckland – colloquially known as Queen St

=== V-Max ===
V-Max cinemas feature enhanced film display, picture quality, and immersive surround sound. The screens at V-Max used to be a minimum width of 25 meters or greater, however, that was lowered to 20 metres in 2010. V-Max cinemas are placed in large auditoriums which feature larger seats, stadium seating and wider arm-rests. Select locations also feature Dolby Atmos. The V-Max format is also provided at many Event Cinemas sites in Australia and New Zealand.

V-Max Cinemas are usually separate from the normal cinema complexes, like the Gold Class. There are certain locations that has Dolby Atmos surround sound included in their V-Max cinemas (brackets indicating). V-Max Cinema locations include:

In Australia:

V-Max locations in AUS

- Bondi Junction
- Brisbane City
- Burwood
- Cairns Central
- Cairns Smithfield (Dolby Atmos)
- Cairns Earlville
- Campbelltown
- Carindale
- Castle Hill
- Chermside
- Coomera (Dolby Atmos)
- Ed Square (Dolby Atmos)
- Garden City Mt Gravatt
- George Street (Sydney CBD) (Dolby Atmos)
- Glendale
- Hornsby
- Hurstville (Dolby Atmos)
- Indooroopilly
- Innaloo
- Kawana (Dolby Atmos)
- Kotara (Dolby Atmos)
- Liverpool
- Loganholme
- Marion
- Miranda (Dolby Atmos)
- North Lakes (Dolby Atmos)
- Palmerston (Dolby Atmos)
- Parramatta
- Robina
- Springfield (Dolby Atmos)
- Toowoomba Grand Central (Dolby Atmos)
- Top Ryde City
- Tuggerah
- Whitford (Dolby Atmos)

In New Zealand:

V-Max locations in NZ
- Queensgate Shopping Centre (Dolby Atmos)
- Westfield St Lukes
- Westfield Manukau
- Westfield Albany
- Westfield Newmarket (Dolby Atmos)
- Tauranga Crossing (Dolby Atmos)

=== IMAX ===
IMAX uses precision lasers a sharper brighter images. This technology is currently available at Event Cinemas Auckland (Queen St), Event Cinemas Queensgate (Wellington), Event Cinemas Pacific Fair (Broadbeach), Event Cinemas Innaloo, and IMAX Sydney

=== Digital 3D ===
GUO converted most of their Australian auditoriums and flagship cinemas to digital projectors. The installation of these projectors means that most auditoriums are now RealD 3D capable. Albany, Queen St Auckland, St Lukes, Henderson West City, Mt Wellington Sylvia Park, Broadway Newmarket, Glenfield Mall on level 5 Entertainment, Manukau Amersham Way, Highland Park, John Goulter Mangere, New Lynn and Crosstown Lakewood Court.

=== 4DX ===
In late 2018, the first 4DX screen owned by the Event Group was opened in George Street (Sydney CBD). 4DX stimulates all five senses, featuring moving seats and special effects including wind, fog, water and scents that synchronise with the action on screen.

=== Junior ===
Event Junior is a family‑friendly cinema experience by Event Cinemas in Australia, designed for children aged 8 and under. It combines an in‑cinema playground with slides, climbing structures and interactive games alongside movie screenings featuring modified lighting and sound, kid‑friendly seating and a dedicated children's menu. The first Event Junior locations opened at Event Cinemas Macquarie and Shellharbour in October 2019.

=== Boutique ===
EVENT Boutique cinemas feature recliners with footrest, and in-cinema food-and-drink service. Guests have access to the Boutique Cinema 30 minutes prior to their session. Boutique is currently available at Event Cinemas George Street (Sydney CBD).

=== ScreenX ===
On 15 August 2023, Event Cinemas announced that ScreenX would come to Australia for the first time. It opened at Event Cinemas Robina on 17 August. It later opened at Event Cinemas Campbelltown later that year on 14 December (in time for the Australian release of Wonka).

== Moonlight Cinema ==
Moonlight Cinema is an outdoor seasonal exhibitor that operates in most Australian metropolitan areas. Moonlight was acquired by EVENT in 2010 from Prime Media Group for $1.75 million. The division continues to grow and has signed 3 new venue contracts since its acquisition, and currently operates in:

New South Wales

- Centennial Parklands, Sydney
- Western Sydney Parklands, Sydney

Queensland

- Roma Street Parkland, Brisbane

South Australia

- Botanic Park, Adelaide

Victoria

- Royal Botanic Gardens, Melbourne

Western Australia

- Kings Park, Perth

In addition, each venue offers 'Gold Grass' an outdoor-cinema experience, similar to the offerings of Event Cinemas' 'Gold Class'.

== Cinebuzz Rewards ==
All cinema brands trading under EVENT, including Moonlight and BCC cinemas, share the benefits of a Loyalty program the Cinebuzz Rewards Program. Free for members, the program grants access to advance screenings, ticket discounts, access to the Cinebuzz video-on-demand platform, and one free movie ticket for every six movies viewed at EVENT. The program is aimed at encouraging brand loyalty and recognising VIP Customers and currently has over 3 million members in Australia.

== Controversy ==
The exhibition and production company that became Event Cinemas has been widely criticised as the cause of the downfall of early Australian film, which was argued to be the best in the world at the time.

In 2005, Event Cinemas banned people from bringing their own food and drink into the cinema. After negative public reaction and a threat of investigation by NSW Fair Trading, the company was forced to revoke the rule. People complained that Event Cinema's food was more than double the price of that in supermarkets and had less variety.

In 2012, Australian journalist Tim Burrowes attended a screening of Skyfall at an Event Cinema. There were various technical difficulties which resulted in the audience being asked to leave and a manager threatening Burrowes for filming the crowd's reactions.

In the lead up to the 2016 Australian federal election, Chairman Alan Rydge was reported to have donated to Prime Minister Malcolm Turnbull's controversial political fund the Wentworth Forum.

There have been numerous incidents of faulty popcorn machines causing fires to break out in Event Cinemas complexes, including Top Ryde in 2011, Adelaide and Rockhampton in September 2015, Perth in December 2015, and Sydney in August 2016.

== See also ==
- Australian Theatres
- EVT Limited
- Hoyts
- The Movie Masters Cinema Group
- Village Cinemas
- Wallis Cinemas
- Warner Village Cinemas
- Cinema of Australia
