= Australian Theatres =

Australian joint venture between entertainment companies

- Company type: Joint venture
- Industry: Film exhibition
- Founded: 2003; 23 years ago
- Headquarters: Sydney, Australia
- Products: Cinema
- Owners: Village Roadshow; EVT Limited

Australian Theatres is a joint venture between Village Roadshow and EVT Limited.

The partnership was formed on 31 March 2003 between Greater Union and Village Cinemas in Sydney.

The venture includes cinemas under the Village Cinemas, Greater Union, Birch, Carrol and Coyle and Event Cinemas brands. Event Cinemas did not exist at the time Australian Theatres was formed, but because it is operated by Greater Union, it became part of the group as soon as it was established.

Australian Theatres was still in effect as of 2019, and ABN records show the venture as still current as of December 2022.
