= Village Roadshow =

Australian entertainment company

Village Roadshow Pty Limited
- Formerly: Village Roadshow Limited (1988–2021)
- Type: Private
- Traded as: ASX: VRL (until 2021)
- Industry: Media, Entertainment
- Founded: 1954; 72 years ago
- Founder: Roc Kirby
- Headquarters: The Jam Factory, South Yarra, Melbourne, Victoria, Australia
- Area served: Worldwide
- Key people: Robert G. Kirby (executive chairman); Clark Kirby (CEO)
- Products: Cinemas; radio; theme parks; film studio; VHS; film distribution
- Revenue: ▼ A$1.003 billion (2017)
- Net income: ▼ −A$65.62 million (2017)
- Owner: BGH Capital
- Divisions: Village Roadshow Theme Parks
- Subsidiaries: Roadshow Entertainment
- Website: www.villageroadshow.com.au

Village Roadshow is an Australian company which operates cinemas and theme parks, and produces and distributes films. Before being acquired by private equity company BGH Capital, the company was listed on the Australian Securities Exchange and majority owned by Village Roadshow Corporation, with members of founder Roc Kirby's family in the top roles.

== History ==
Village Roadshow originally started operations as Village Drive-Ins (later known as "Village Drive-ins and Cinemas" before becoming today's "Village Cinemas" brand), in 1954, when founder Roc Kirby began running one of Australia's first drive-in cinemas in the Melbourne suburb of Croydon. The drive-in was adjacent to a shopping strip called "Croydon Village"; hence the company adopted the "Village" name. The company later expanded into traditional cinemas in major areas, though it still operates the Coburg Drive-In in Coburg, Melbourne.

In 1968, the company expanded to start its film distribution business with Roadshow (once a 50-50 joint venture with Greater Union) and moved into film production in 1971 with the establishment of Hexagon Productions, and the company expanded into a longstanding collaboration with Warner Bros. to distribute films in the Australian market. The original cinema chain now became one of several businesses the company was involved in.

In the 1980s, Village Roadshow was one of the leading forces in creating state-of-the-art multiplex cinema complexes. Innovations introduced during this period included stadium-style seating, refined sound systems, and the latest projection technologies. The cinemas of that era were the forerunners to the multiplexes of today. It was expanded in 1987 when it signed a partnership with rival cinema chain Greater Union to see 200 screens expanded to their circuits by 1990 and having both companies to develop $100 million in their equipment.

The venture was expanded in September 1987 when Roadshow and Greater Union agreed to combine the existing Roadshow Distributors theatrical branch with Greater Union's own theatrical branch, Greater Union Film Distributors to set up new separate-branding labels, Roadshow Greater Union Distributors and Greater Union Distributors, and RGUD continue to handle the existing suppliers, which included Warner Bros, Orion Pictures and New World Pictures.

In 1988, Village Roadshow took over De Laurentiis Entertainment Group, which brought on a change of name: Village Roadshow Limited. This allowed the company to raise more capital to fund further expansion.

In the 1990s, the company diversified into complementary media and entertainment businesses. This included the purchase and development of theme parks, the purchase and integration of the Triple M and Today radio networks to create Austereo, the creation of Roadshow Music, the creation of Village Roadshow Pictures, and the commencement of a co-production deal with Warner Bros.

Village Roadshow has scaled back its international cinema markets to Australia and Singapore. The company merged its Village Roadshow Pictures arm with Concord Music Group to form a Los Angeles-based diversified entertainment division, Village Roadshow Entertainment Group.

In 2003, the company formed a joint venture, Australian Theatres, with Amalgamated Holdings Limited, owners of Greater Union and several other cinema brands. The original founding business, Village Cinemas, is part of the joint venture.

In 2008, Village Roadshow and Concord Music Group, co-owned by television producer Norman Lear, said they had completed a merger, forming a new company to exploit their film and music assets. Investors in the new company included Michael Lambert and private equity firms Tailwind Capital Partners and Clarity Partners. Then, on March 25, 2013, a Wood Creek Capital led investor group purchased Concord Music Group from Village Roadshow Entertainment Group.

In late 2019, company veteran Graham Burke stepped down as CEO and became a non-executive director, with Clark Kirby his successor as CEO.

In early 2020, Village Roadshow entered talks with private equity firm BGH Capital about a takeover. The offer was lowered after the COVID-19 pandemic closed theme parks and cinemas, and shareholders voted to accept it in December 2020. In 2022, Antenna Group announced that it was to acquire the Greek cinema chains from Village Roadshow Operations.

In 2023, Village Roadshow renamed their company from Village Roadshow Company Limited to Village Roadshow Pty. Limited, due to them no longer being listed on the ASX.

== Assets ==
=== Current ===
- Roadshow Television
  - Roadshow Rough Diamond (partnership with John Edwards)
  - BLINK TV (unfinished production company)
- Australian Theatres (collaboration with Event Hospitality & Entertainment)
  - Village Cinemas (the original business)
  - Event Cinemas
    - Greater Union
    - Birch, Carrol & Coyle
- Roadshow Entertainment
  - Roadshow Films
    - FilmNation Entertainment (31%, May 2020)
- Village Roadshow Entertainment Group (3%, March 2025)
  - Village Roadshow Pictures Entertainment
    - Village Roadshow Pictures
      - Perfect Village Entertainment (China) (partnership with Perfect World Pictures and WME-IMG China)
      - Village Roadshow Pictures Asia
  - Reel Corporation
    - Reel DVD
- Village Roadshow Theme Parks
  - Australian Outback Spectacular
  - Paradise Country
  - Sea World
    - Sea World Resort & Water Park
  - Warner Bros. Movie World (fully owned and operated—licensed from Warner Bros. Discovery)
  - Wet'n'Wild (partnership with CNL Lifestyle Properties)
    - Wet'n'Wild Las Vegas
    - Wet'n'Wild Gold Coast
- Village Roadshow Studios
- Village Roadshow Marketing Solutions
  - Opia
- Village Films Greece
- Roadshow Music
- Golden Village
  - Golden Village Pictures

=== Former ===
- Austereo
- Concord Music
- Edge
- Edge Consumer
- Flying Bark Productions
- Lifestyle Rewards

== See also ==
- List of film production companies
- List of television production companies
- Cinema of Australia
