= EVT Limited =

Australian company

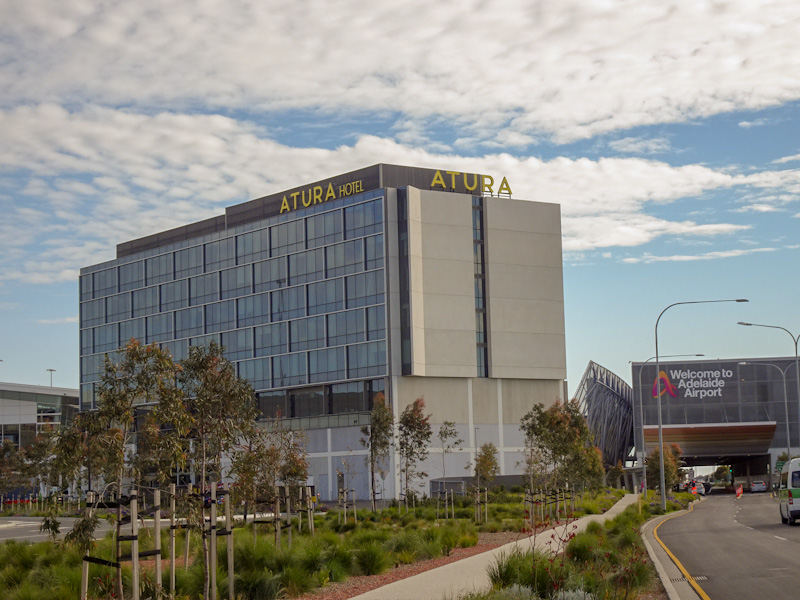
- Atura Hotel, Adelaide Airport
- Type: Public company
- Traded as: ASX: EVT
- Industry: Entertainment, hospitality, travel
- Founded: Listed in 1962 on the Australian Securities Exchange. Subsidiaries date to 1910.
- Headquarters: 478 George Street, Sydney
- Area served: Australia, Germany, New Zealand.
- Key people: Alan Rydge (Chairman); Jane Hastings (Managing Director and Chief Executive Officer)
- Revenue: ▼ A$1.03 billion (2020); A$1.30 billion (2019)
- Net income: ▼ A$-10.6 million (2020); A$111.8 million (2019)
- Total equity: ▼ A$975.1 million (2020)
- Number of employees: 8,000–10,000
- Website: https://www.evt.com/

EVT Limited (stylised as EVT) (an acronym of the words 'Entertainment, Ventures, Travel') is an Australian company which operates cinemas, hotels, restaurants and resorts in Australia, New Zealand and Germany.

It owns Event Cinemas, BCC Cinemas and CineStar, as well as golf courses and the ski resort Thredbo. Hotels owned by the group include the Rydges, QT, Lylo and Atura brands.

The company was formerly called Amalgamated Holdings Limited and, from 2015, Event Hospitality and Entertainment. It is listed on the Australian Securities Exchange.

== Structure and brands ==
For much of EVT's recent history it has effectively been controlled by billionaire Alan Rydge, whose family companies reportedly owned 45 per cent of the shares in 2004, and 60 per cent in 2011.

As of 2019, EVT owns the largest cinema chains in Australia and New Zealand. Its cinema brands include Event Cinemas, BCC, CineStar, Greater Union, GU Film House, Moonlight Cinema, and the Sydney State Theatre. Event also owns over 60 hotels worldwide, operating more than 10,000 rooms, under the subsidiaries Atura Hotels, Rydges Hotels & Resorts, QT Hotels & Resorts, Lylo and the Thredbo Alpine Village, making it Australia's fourth-largest hotel operator. Revenue is also generated from managing and leasing commercial property.

As of 2017, the company had 62 hotels and resorts around the world, along with 75 cinemas in Australia, 54 cinemas in Germany, and 20 cinemas in New Zealand. In 2014–2015 it was making most of its money from its cinema division, and described Event Cinemas as its flagship. In 2014, it was the fourth biggest owner of hotels in Australia, offering 9,000 rooms across the country.

Most of its hotel and cinema brands are based in Australia, but some are in other countries:

- Australia: Atura Hotels, BCC Cinemas, Edge Content and Technology, Event Cinemas, Greater Union Cinemas, Moonlight Cinemas, QT Hotels & Resorts, Rydges Hotels & Resorts, State Theatre Sydney, Thredbo Alpine Village.
- New Zealand: Downtown Cinemas, Event Cinemas, QT Hotels & Resorts, Rialto Cinemas, Rydges Hotels & Resorts, Lylo
- Germany: CineStar Cinemas

== Corporate alliances ==
Event Hospitality and Entertainment owns and operates some of its cinema chains as a joint venture with Village Roadshow, established in 2003 under the name Australian Theatres.

Many of its hotels belonged to the Global Hotel Alliance until late 2021.

WVT’s Thredbo Alpine Village is affiliated with the IKON multi-resort season pass program sold by Alterra Mountain Company

== History ==
=== 1911–1940s ===
In 1911, The Christian was released. This was the first film produced by West's Pictures, which later became part of Greater Union. From 1911 to 1913, a series of mergers resulted in the formation of The Combine, a powerful alliance between exhibitor Union Theatres and the production and distribution company Australasian Films. The Combine imported many of its films and was blamed by independent competitors for a drop in the local production of films.

In 1928, the company has sold off Australasian Films to John C. Jones, which later on absorbed into Columbia Pictures in 1935. In 1930, it reentered the theatrical market as the Union Theaters Feature Exchange by distributing features by British International Pictures. Two years later, the company was renamed to British Empire Films (BEF), which served as the distribution arm of Greater Union. They distributed films of Cinesound Productions.

In 1932, the box-office hit On Our Selection was produced by Cinesound Productions, a subsidiary which had been set up the previous year by Greater Union Theatres. In 1936, businessman Norman Rydge was elected chairman and managing director of Greater Union Theatres after buying a controlling interest. The company returned to profitability within three years.

In 1942, Cinesound co-produced Kokoda Front Line!, the first Australian film to win an Academy Award. A full-length version of a wartime newsreel, it won an Oscar for best documentary.

=== 1970s–1980s ===
In 1971, the company acquired the assets of MGM's Australian operations, and MGM's films would be distributed by the company's subsidiary British Empire Films in Australia for two years, with Disney included in the contract, before MGM gave up its contract to Cinema International Corporation in 1973. The company also entered its relationship with Buena Vista International for the company's B.E.F. unit to distribute its films. In 1976, the company's film distribution unit changed its name from British Empire Films to GUO Film Distributors.

In 1980, Alan Rydge inherited the company on the death of his father, becoming the youngest chairman of an Australian public company. In 1982, the company's film distribution division was renamed to Greater Union Film Distributors after introducing a new logo. In 1984, the company was once again fully Australian-owned after gaining control of Rank Organisation's half share.

In 1987, the company acquired Thredbo Alpine Resort. Also that year, Greater Union merged its distribution unit with Roadshow Distributors, a Village Roadshow subsidiary to form a film distribution division consisting of two units, Roadshow Film Distributors, and Greater Union Distributors. The company as a whole merged into Roadshow five years later.

In 1988, Rydge wanted to begin a hotels division and so recruited David Seargeant, who later became managing director.

=== 2000s ===
In 2003, Event Ltd partnered in a joint venture with Village Roadshow. Their joint entity was established under the name Australian Theatres.

In 2004, Amalgamated Holdings Ltd (AHL) suffered a share plunge after writing off more than $70 million on its German cinemas. In 2005, Greater Union dropped its ban against cinemagoers bringing their own snacks and drinks after an investigation by the New South Wales Commissioner for Fair Trading. The same year, the Rydge family expanded its compound on Point Piper by buying a sixth adjoining property.

In 2009, Meredith Hellicar resigned from the company board after being criticised in a judgement by the New South Wales Supreme Court for her part in approving, while chairwoman of James Hardie, a press release which falsely claimed that a trust for asbestosis victims had been fully funded.

=== 2010s ===
In 2010, Amalgamated bought a chain of cinemas in New Zealand and Fiji from Skycity Entertainment Group. The same year, it also acquired outdoor cinema operator Moonlight Cinema for $1.75 million from Prime Media Group. In the financial year 2010–2011, Alan Rydge was among the wealthy Australians who donated to a secret fund set up for Sydney politician Malcolm Turnbull.

In 2011, Amalgamated sold its 49 per cent share of a cinema chain in the Middle East. The same year, its operations in Queensland suffered losses due to severe flooding in 2010–2011.

In 2013, the Featherdale Wildlife Park in Sydney was sold to Moss Capital for an estimated A$15 million. Amalgamated had owned the park since 1996. In 2014, a three-year plan was unveiled to build or redevelop 14 new cinemas.

In December 2015, Amalgamated Holdings Ltd changed its name to Event Hospitality and Entertainment Limited. Its ticker code changed from AHD to EVT on the Australian Securities Exchange. In November 2016, David Seargeant gave notice that he would step down as managing director and CEO in the second half of 2017. He was replaced by Jane Hastings.

In 2017, the company sold its two-thirds interest in a Fiji cinema joint venture.

=== 2020s ===
The COVID-19 pandemic resulted in mandatory government-ordered closures of cinema locations between March 2020 to July 2020 in Australia and New Zealand. The Australian government also converted many Rydges hotel locations to mandatory quarantine stations for international and domestic travellers.

In 2021, EVT acquired the Jucy Snooze brand, a budget accommodation provider in New Zealand. Between 2022 and 2024, Jucy Snooze locations were rebranded to Lylo

In October 2022, Event Hospitality & Entertainment Limited rebranded to EVT Limited.

== See also ==
- Cinema of Australia – History
