= Roc Kirby =

Australian businessman (1918–2008)

Roc Kirby AM
- Born: Roscoe Kirby; 14 March 1918; Leongatha, Victoria, Australia
- Died: 25 January 2008 (aged 89); Melbourne, Victoria. Australia
- Known for: Founding Village Roadshow
- Spouse: Beatrice Kirby

Roscoe "Roc" Kirby AM (14 March 1918 – 25 January 2008) was an Australian businessman who founded the Village Roadshow cinema chain and film production company.

== Biography ==
Roc Kirby was born in Leongatha, Victoria in March 1918. He entered the cinema business at the bottom end, selling ice creams and sweeping floors at his father's cinemas on the Mornington Peninsula, then graduating to managing the small chain of Kirby Cinemas. In 1954, Kirby took the financially risky step of constructing a drive-in theatre called "The Village Drive-in" at Croydon, and soon afterwards the company owned around 40 drive-in theatres. With cinema attendances dropping due to the introduction of television, Village made a move into the metropolitan "hard-top" cinemas, and then into twin cinemas and multiplexes.

In 1989, Village Roadshow went public, making an aggressive move into other markets, such as film production, theme parks and radio. After the public float, the Kirby family remained the majority shareholders, owning 51.5% of the shares in Village Roadshow. Roc Kirby retired as CEO in 1988, leaving the running of Village Roadshow to his sons, Robert and John, as chairman and deputy chairman, and "surrogate son", Graham Burke, as managing director.

At his death Village Roadshow comprised "a production division, an extensive cinema exhibition business, three theme parks on the Gold Coast and a stake in the listed radio company Austereo".

Roc Kirby died at the age of 89 on 25 January 2008, just after suffering an illness.

== Impact ==
John Cain II, a former Victorian Premier, interviewed Roc Kirby for his book on Australian Entertainment Pioneers, On with the Show. Roc Kirby is credited in the book for being "one of the few people to judge correctly that TV would not kill cinema, 'and refused to scuttle out of it when his contemporaries were deserting it in droves'". He has also been described as "probably Australia's most visionary cinema or entertainment company entrepreneur".

Roc Kirby also supported the local film industry and was a partner of Tim Burstall in Hexagon Productions, which made some of the early films of the Australian film renaissance such as Alvin Purple and Petersen.

== Honours ==
Roc Kirby was appointed as a Member of the Order of Australia for service to the entertainment industry in the Queen's Birthday Honours in 1993.
