= Anděl (neighborhood) =

Coordinates: 50°04′19″N 14°24′14″E

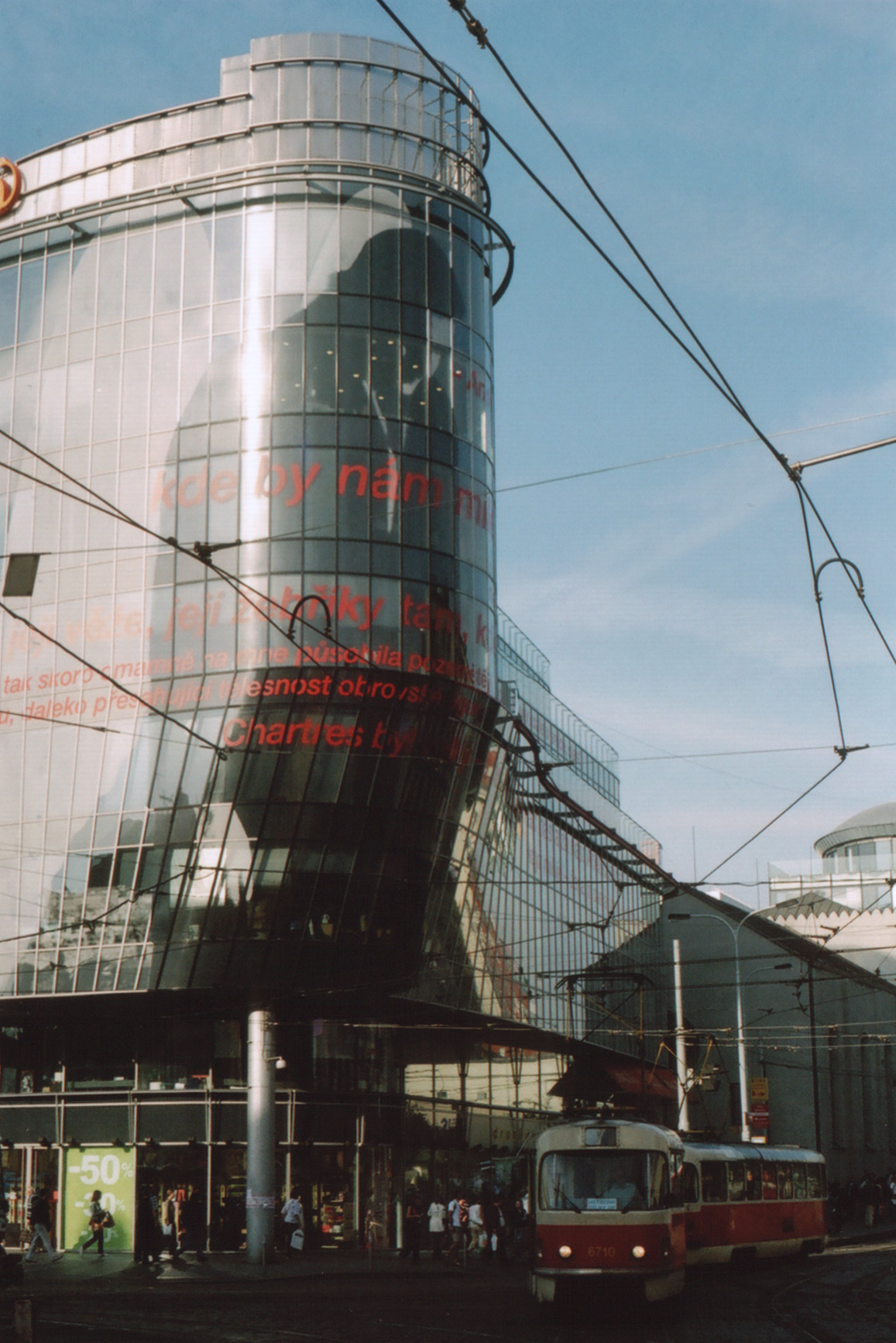
Anděl crossing and Zlatý Anděl building in the southwest corner

Anděl is a neighborhood in Prague 5's central district of Smíchov, centered on a busy interchange. The name means 'angel' in Czech and originates from the 19th century U zlatého anděla (Golden Angel) pub originally named after a fresco in the gable depicting an angel. The painting of an angel was preserved after its demolition and is now displayed nearby the metro station entrance.

Anděl is an important traffic center. Prague Metro's Line B runs beneath it, Anděl Station serving the area. Tramway lines in north–south and east–west direction cross there (lines 4, 6, 7, 9, 10, 12, 14 and 20). Otherwise, it is a pedestrian zone.

After redevelopment in the late 1990s, when French architect Jean Nouvel designed an office building called Golden Angel (Zlatý Anděl) above the Metro station with a picture of an angel from the movie Wings of Desire and quotes from Rainer Maria Rilke on its facade, Anděl became one of the busiest parts of the city, with many offices of national and international companies. Across it (in the north-west quadrant), one of Prague's biggest shopping malls, Nový Smíchov, can be found, including multiplex cinema Cinema City; another multiplex, Cinestar (former Village Cinemas), is nearby in the Anděl City complex. Smíchov Synagogue is also in the area.

== Gallery ==
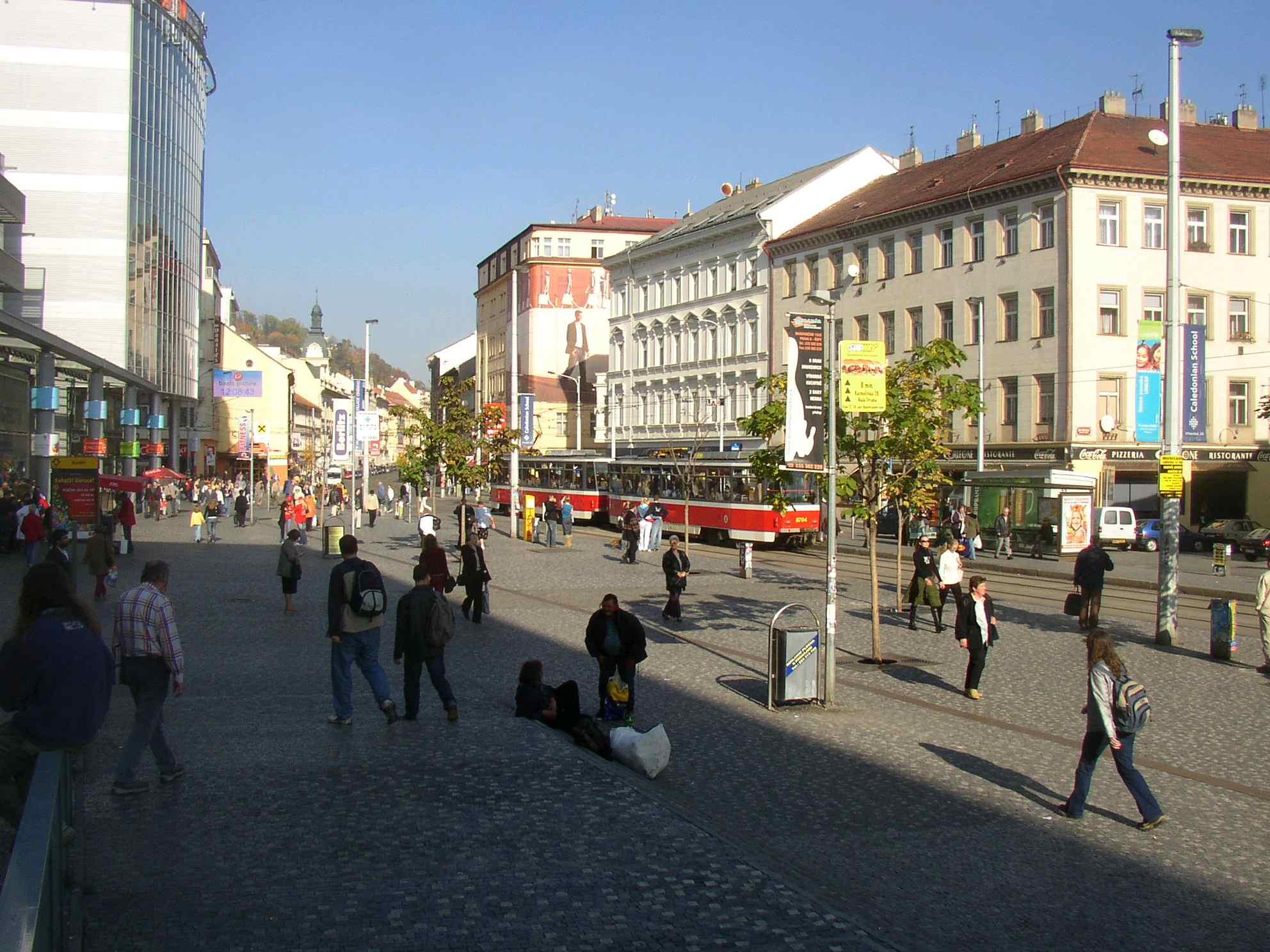
Anděl crossroad from Nádražní Street viewed towards Štefánikova Street in the north.

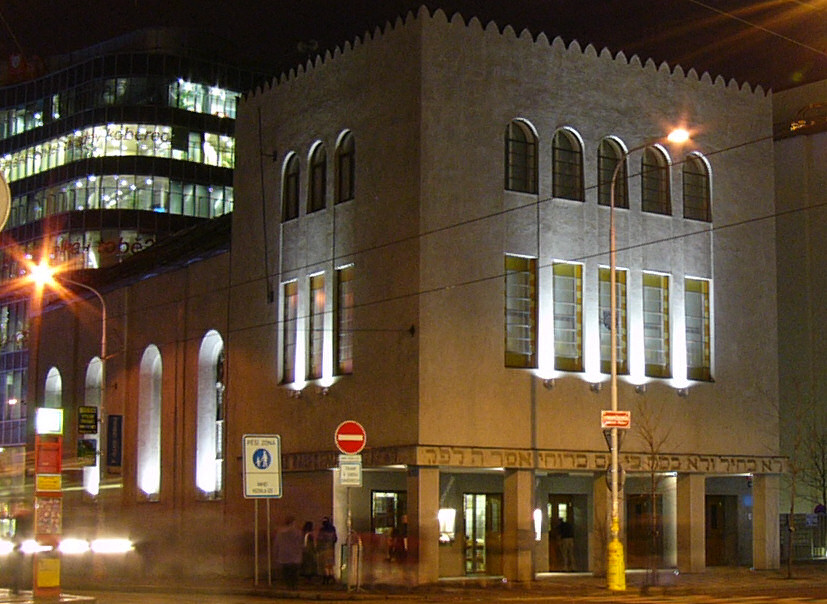
Smíchov Synagogue from northwest, Zlatý Anděl on the left

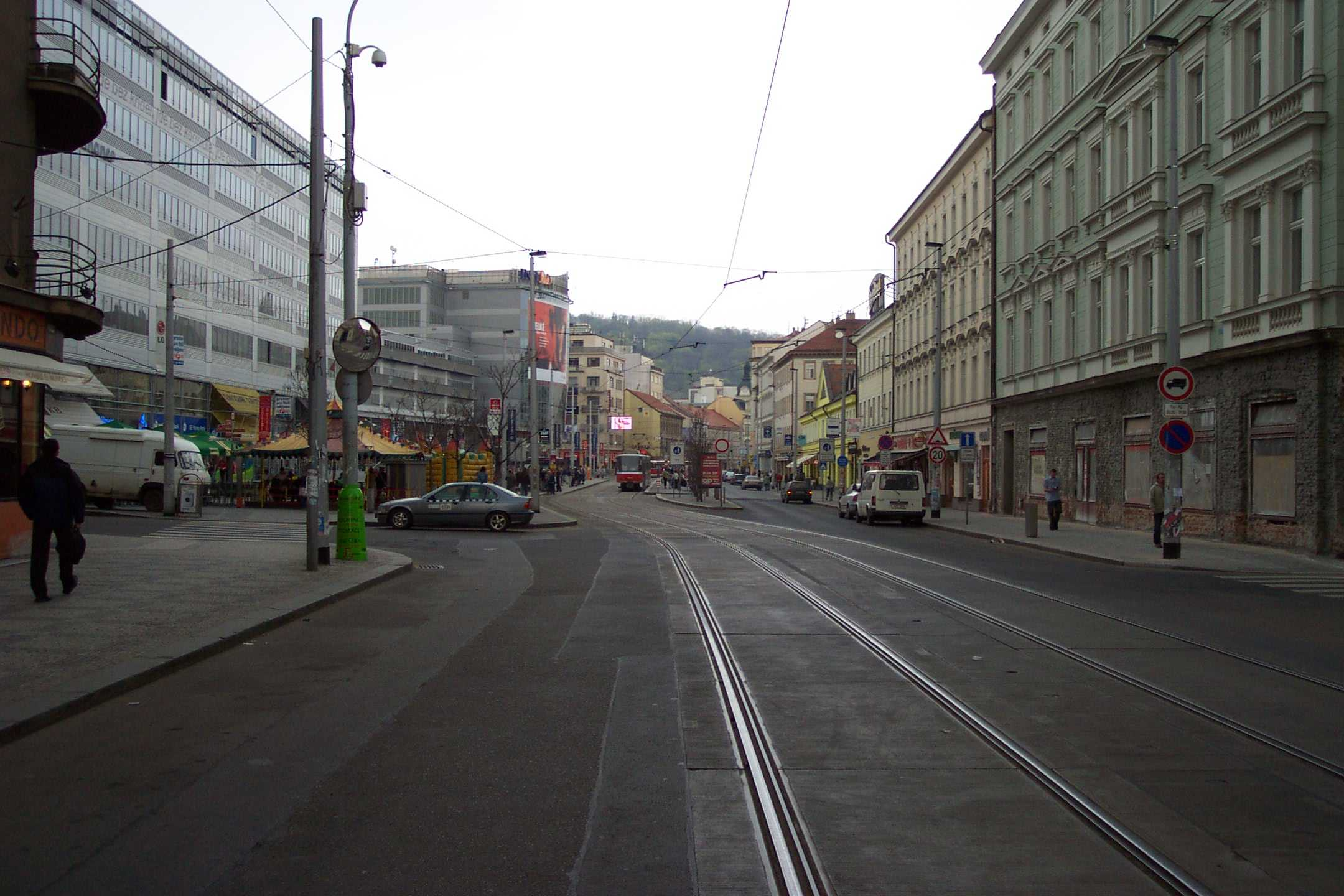
Anděl from further south; Zlatý Anděl complex on the left
