= The Jam Factory =

Shopping and entertainment centre in Melbourne, Australia

Coordinates: 37°50′34″S 144°59′44″E

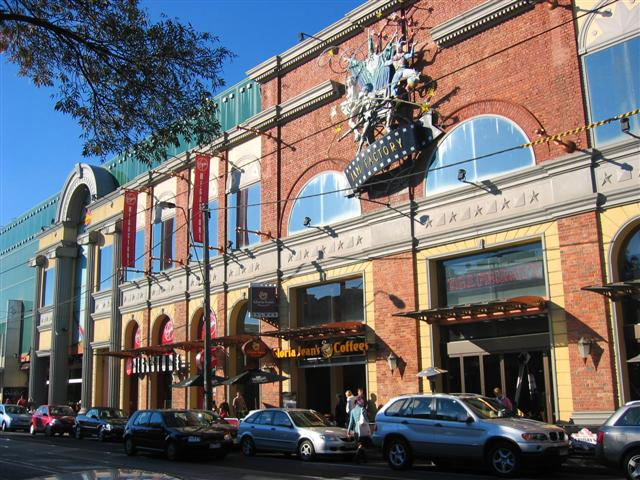
Jam Factory, Chapel Street

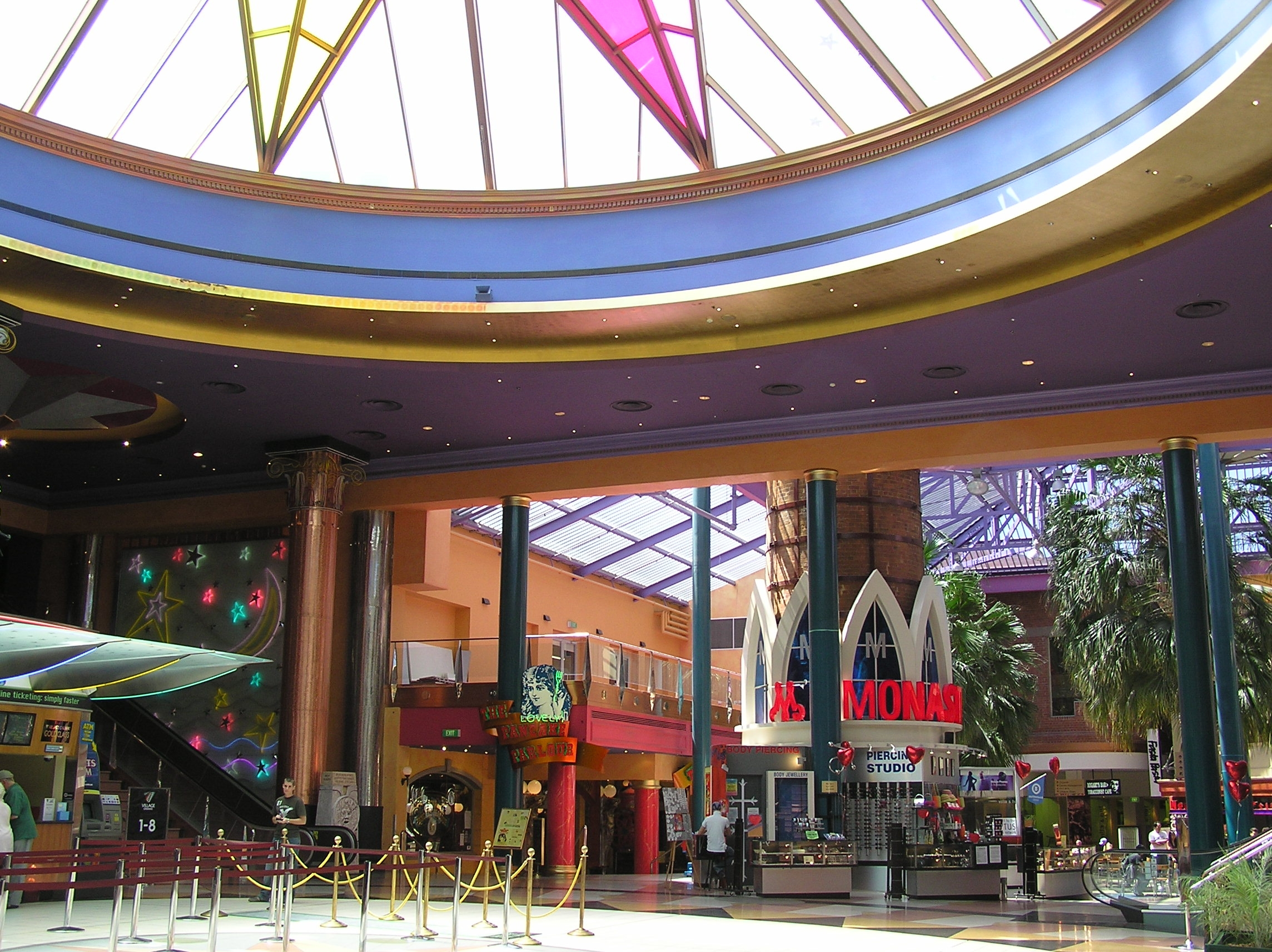
Jam Factory interior

The Jam Factory was a shopping and entertainment centre, located in Chapel Street, South Yarra, a suburb of Melbourne, Australia. The Jam Factory is owned by Newmark Capital. It is also the headquarters of Village Roadshow.

== History ==
The Jam Factory was originally established as the Victorian Brewery in 1858, having a value of 150 pounds. The brewery shut down in 1876, with the building and land then being purchased the same year by Robert Wright and Robert Payne, who began the Victoria Preserving Company.

By 1880, it was named the Red Cross preserving company. During the fruit season it employed 230 people, and was the largest employer in Prahran. William Peacock bought the premises and turned it into the 'OK' Jam Co in 1895 and resold it to Henry Jones IXL. Jam production continued in the building for this firm until 1970.

At a cost of $20 million the site was redeveloped and opened on 9 October 1979 as a shopping centre named The Jam Factory, offering modern fashion, gift stores and cafes, among others. Georges had a store. In 1995 it was redeveloped again. Village Cinemas took the upstairs space. Georges moved out and many tenants changed.

The shopping centre also housed the first Australian Borders shop opening in 1998. It has since closed, along with the rest of the bankrupt chain, in 2011, when its regional parent company, REDgroup Retail, went into administration. The Jam Factory was also chosen by Brazin to be the first site to reintroduce Virgin Megastores in Australia opening in 2002. It was closed by Sanity in 2010 with the Virgin space then occupied by the country's first Urban by Target store.

Before these major tenants closed their Jam Factory outlets, its owner, Challenger, announced in June 2008 a $700 million redevelopment that did not proceed. It would have seen the historic factory building demolished and replaced with a new style shopping centre (54,000 square metres of shops, more than double the present size), apartment towers built on the car park closest to Virgin Megastore/Urban by Target, 8,000 square metres of office space, and a 100-room hotel. Challenger then attempted to sell the entire site in May 2009 for about $110 million without success. In 2015, the Jam Factory was purchased by Newmark Capital.

In early 2024, Newmark Capital sold its remaining stake in the Jam Factory to a joint venture between Gurner Group and Qualitas, who became the sole owners and developers of the site. Led by Tim Gurner and Mark Fischer respectively, the partnership announced a $2.75 billion redevelopment plan, including luxury residences, two hotels, a wellness precinct, and a reimagined cinema and dining complex. Ahmed Fahour AO, former CEO of Australia Post, was appointed Group CEO of Gurner Group in late 2024 to oversee the expansion. In November 2024, Village Cinemas announced the closure of their Jam Factory cinema, and it, along with the Jam Factory closed the following month, following plans for a complete rebuild into a new cinema and dining complex, including apartments, a luxury hotel and a revamped movie theatre.

On 19 September 2025, a fire broke out at the under-construction site, with the blaze engulfing about a third of a three-storey brick building which was still standing on the Garden Street side of the historical site. This took place during active demolition and is currently under investigation by Victoria Police and the Arson Squad.
