= Karingal Hub =

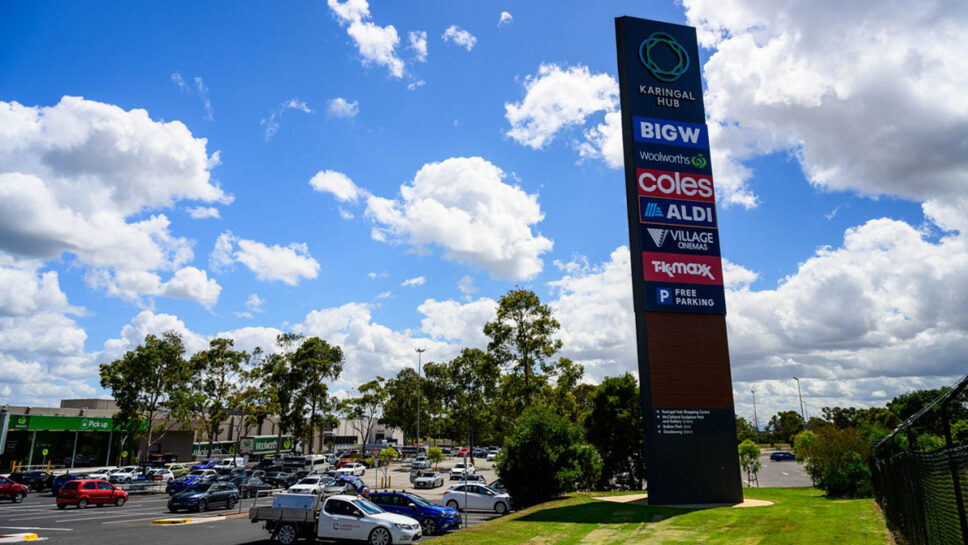
- Location: Frankston, Victoria, Australia
- Coordinates: 38°9′12″S 145°9′56″E
- Address: 330 Cranbourne Road
- Opened: 1978
- Previous names: Centro Karingal, Centro, Star Zone,
- Owner: IFM Investors
- Num. of stores: 200+
- Floor area: 53,000 m^{2} (570,000 sq ft)
- Floors: 3
- Parking: 2880
- Website: www.karingalhub.com.au

Karingal Hub is a super-regional shopping centre in Frankston, Victoria, Australia, approximately 40 kilometres (25 mi) south of the Melbourne central business district. The complex has a combined gross leasable area of 53,000 m^{2} (570,000 sq ft), 2,750 parking spaces and 200+ stores. It was acquired by ISPT in July 2013 and has been owned by other large corporations in the past such as Vicinity Centres, which owns its major competitor Bayside. It has the only Big W in and around the peninsula and features a multitude of popular shops, including a renovated and large playground within its Town Square as well as an additional smaller playground in the south of the building, close to the retailer aforementioned.

== Town Square ==
The Town Square is a regional precinct for the locality of Karingal in Frankston, Victoria. It is situated on Karingal Drive and is managed by Karingal Hub. Its predecessor was constructed in 2005 under the name of 'Star Zone Karingal' which subsequently underwent major redevelopment in 2022 and was renamed and coined as the "Town Square" of Karingal. It boasts a multitude of shops and experiences such as its 12 screen Village Cinemas multiplex with 3 Gold Class facilities and 1 former state-of-the-art VMax auditorium, the Goodlife Health Gym as well as restaurants/fast-food stores like Grill'd, Schnitz, Rashays, San Churro and more.

Its original form of 'Star Zone Karingal' was the first of the range of centres that used the terminology of "Star Zone" under the Village Cinemas enterprise. The 2021 redevelopment of Karingal Hub would allow portions of the initial parking enclave to be repurposed, allowing the accommodation of new retail outlets and the construction of an expansive multi-level car park (see § History and Developments).

== History and developments ==
=== Early years ===
Karingal Hub opened in 1978 with a simple L-shape designed mall including the two anchor tenants of Big W and Safeway. Karingal Hub was managed by Jennings Properties, a part of AVJennings of which developed the Karingal estate.

Karingal Hub expanded in 1984, adding a third mall section with space for another large tenant. This would end up being occupied by Woolworths, who by 1985 owned Safeway, retaining the space (essentially two of the same supermarket) to keep a monopoly on the locality.

Jennings Properties later became Centro in the 1990's (now Vicinity Centres after a Novion merger), and like other Centro shopping centres, Karingal Hub was later renamed to Centro Karingal. There were a number of minor additions during the 90's, including a new food court.

=== Growth ===
In 2005, the centre expanded. A new Village Cinemas (see § Town Square) and entertainment and wellbeing multiplex called Star Zone opened. This was to compete with Bayside Shopping Centre's plan to open an entertainment complex with a multi-screen cinema in Frankston's CBD, completing its construction a year after Karingal's Star Zone. The multiplex in Karingal was physically disconnected from the main centre but shared the same management and parking and could be traversed to and back safely using pedestrian paths. In 2006, redevelopment of the main shopping centre included the refurbishment of the inner and outer facades as well as an extension of the northwest portion where the current Best and Less and River stores are currently located in addition to a large atrium food court and concourse, increasing the gross lettable area up by 12,500 square meters.

=== Acquisition and redesignation ===
In July, 2013, Karingal Hub was acquired by ISPT (the Industry Superannuation Property Trust) from Federation Centres (Centro's name before the Novion merger) for $115 million. In the same month, both of the Safeway stores in the centre were rebranded to Woolworths following the Woolworth Group 1985 acquisition of Safeway Pty Ltd and its decision to unify the branding.

=== 2021 and onwards ===
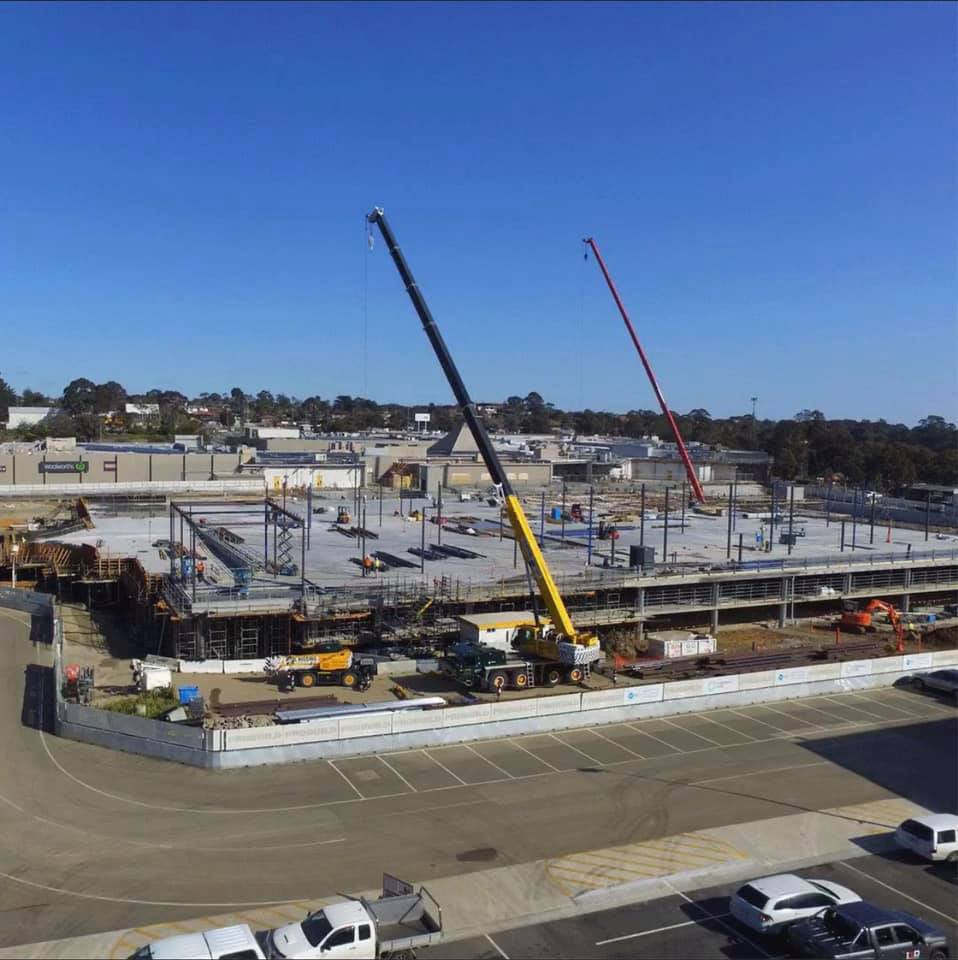
Construction of the Fresh Food Precinct (Aldi, Coles, Woolworths)

In 2021, Karingal Hub unveiled a $160 million renovation and extension of its premises which included 12,000m$^{2}$ of new shopping space added on onto the existing infrastructure in three separate stages, connecting the two separate spaces of the main shopping mall and entertainment space, with the plan being under consideration since April 2013.

==== Stage 1 ====
The first stage introduced Karingal Hub's new 'Fresh Food Precinct' which featured more than 28 fresh food and specialty retailers, including a new marketplace, Coles, Aldi, a refurbished Woolworths as well as additional stores such as Baker's Delight, Poultry Plus, Roll'd, Walker's Doughnuts, and more. It featured a huge open space in the heart of such area for specialty kiosks and events.

==== Stage 2 ====
The second stage opened more than 40 stores that were featured in its 'Fashion and Lifestyle Precinct' which includes places like Cotton On, Factorie, and more. This stage is regarded as a refurbishment and overhaul of the existing building as the centre's floor area remained unchanged. The construction included the shutdown of the southern Woolworths store in the centre due to the 'Fresh Food Precinct,' with its physical premises being divided and transformed into a Cotton On Megastore, Glue and Tk Maxx. This stage also introduced the new Food Court now located opposite Big W and adjacent Tk Maxx. The previous food court located to the north of the new one in addition to its large open space area was fully demolished and rebuilt, integrating into the fashion precinct. Some retailers such as McDonald's has not returned to Karingal Hub after this renovation for unknown reasons, leading to a controversy, however evidence suggests that due to another franchisee of McDonald's being in a close proximity to Karingal Hub, they may have chosen not to reopen.

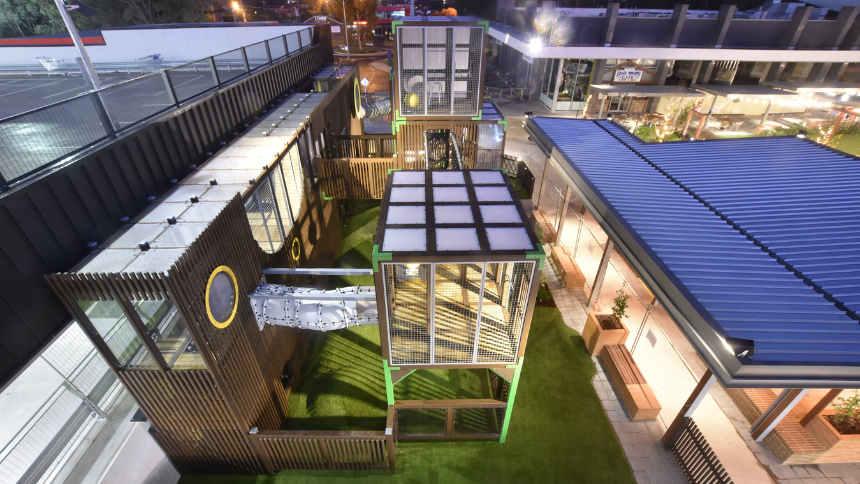
Karingal Hub's 'Happy Camp' Playground

==== Stage 3 ====
The third and final stage introduced the § Town Square which was an overhaul to the former "Star Zone Karingal" area and includes the existing Village Cinemas in addition to a range of dining experiences, communal gathering and play areas. A new escalator and lift connects it vitally to the main and central section of Karingal Hub through the Fresh Food Precinct.

== Retailers ==
Karingal Hub has a wide variety of supermarkets, discount department stores and specialty stores as well as a Village Cinemas 12 screen theatre and Goodlife Health Clubs gym.

Major retailers include Coles, Woolworths, Big W, Aldi, Hungry Jack's, Village Cinemas, TK Maxx and Best & Less.

As well as some minor retailers such as Schnitz, The Reject Shop, Liquorland, 7-Eleven, Sushi Sushi, Hungry Jack's, ANZ, Commonwealth Bank, Rashays and Grill'd.

== Accessibility and location ==
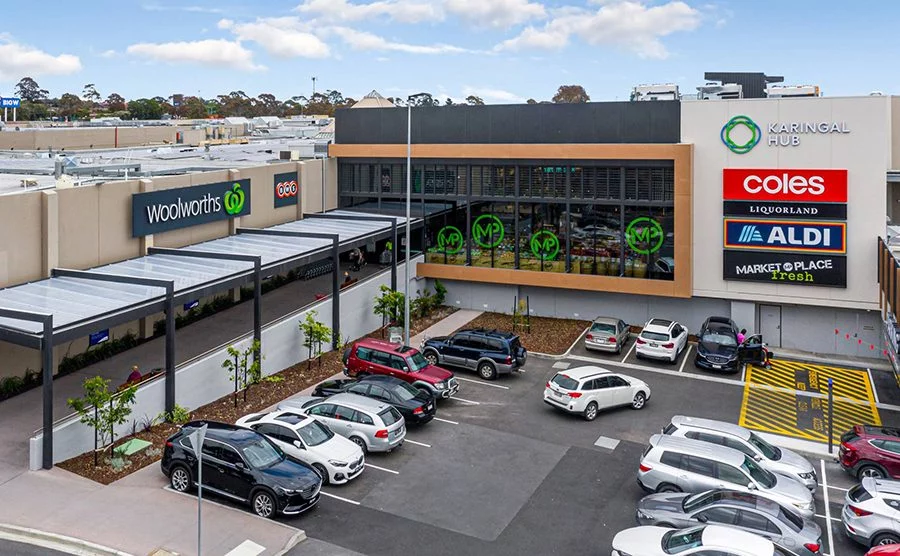
Outside view of completed Coles and Aldi precinct

Karingal Hub is located in the locality of Karingal, a medium sized district in Frankston, Victoria. It is located on 330 Cranbourne Road, beside the Eastlink freeway and adjacent to a Dan Murphy's and Mitre 10, not directly correlated with the centre as many presume. The shopping centre has 3 levels of car parking including a new rooftop parking and two floors of shopping (when including the § Town Square, with disabled parking bays and bicycle racks at all major entrances, and escalators / lifts when necessary.

The store can be accessed via bus, train, taxi, uber, car, walking, biking, and more.

== Competition ==
Karingal Hub has two main local shopping centre competitors, Bayside Shopping Centre and the Frankston Power Centre, both located less than 5 kilometres from Karingal Hub. Frankston Power Centre is primarily a hard goods mall, but some product categories overlap.

== Gallery ==
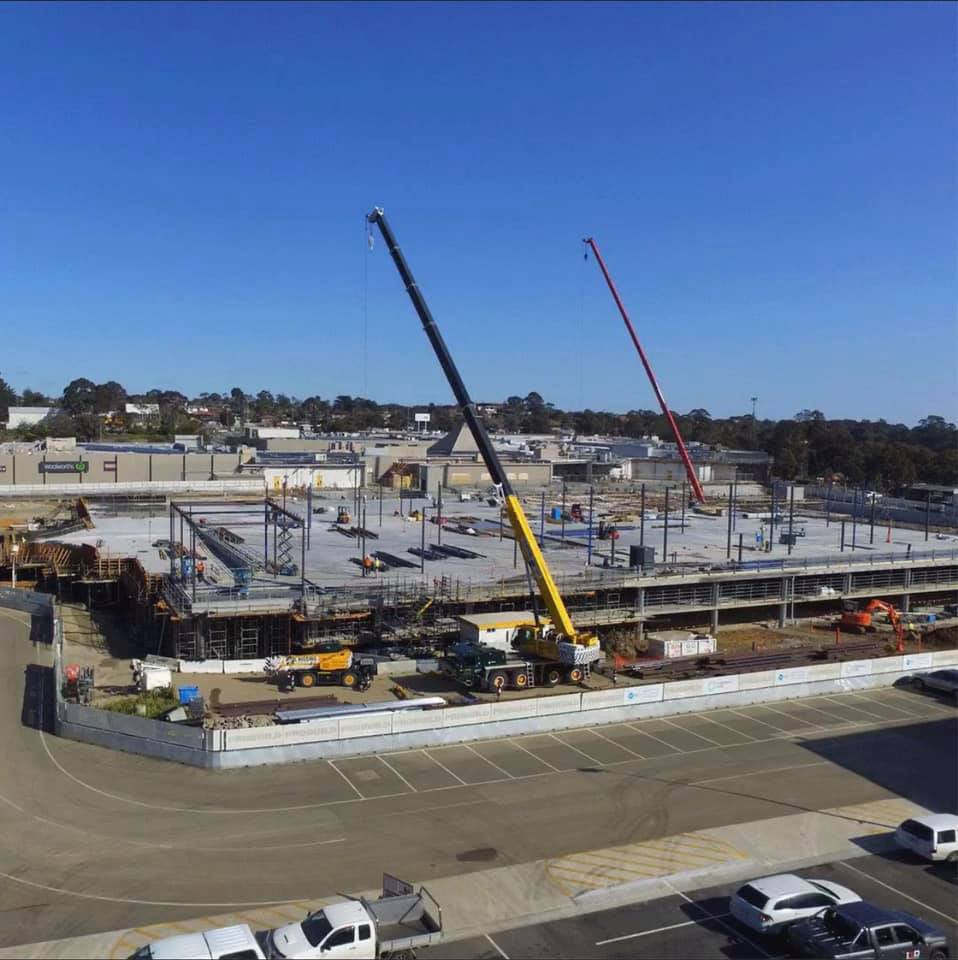
Construction of Coles and Aldi precinct in Karingal Hub

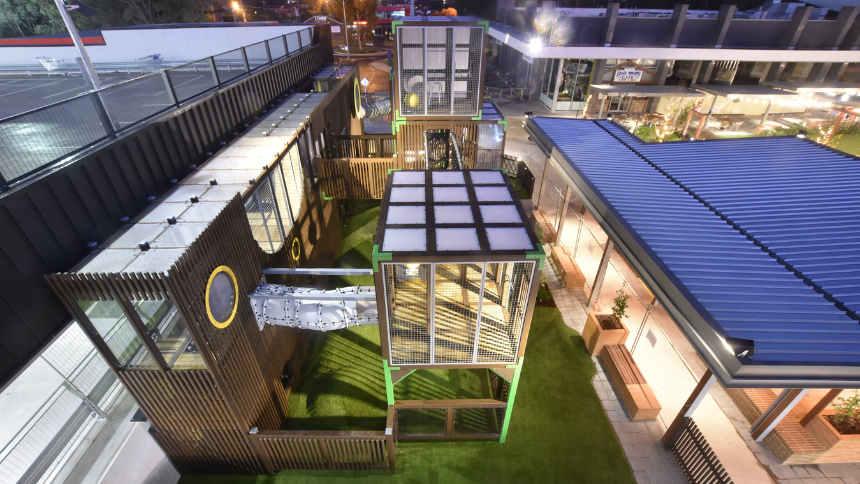
Back view of Karingal Hub's 'Happy Camp' Playground

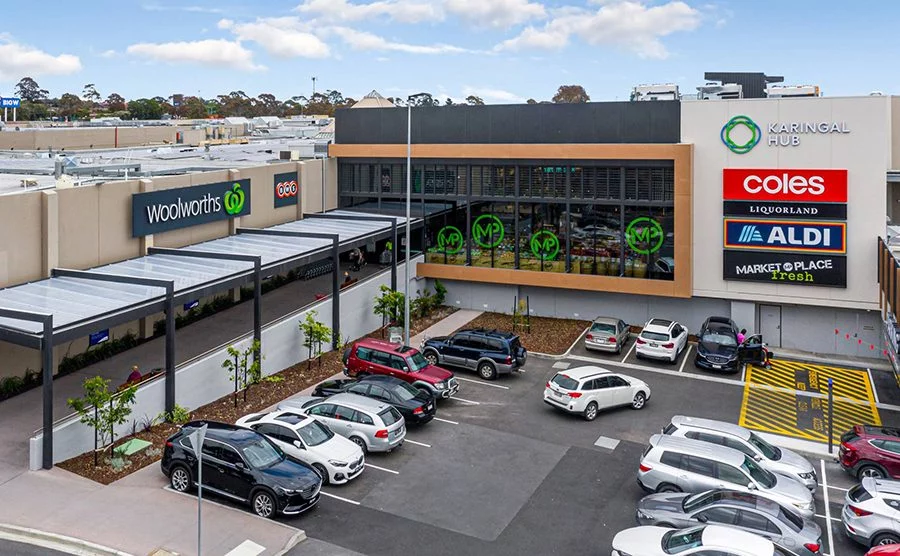
Outside view of completed Coles and Aldi precinct in Karingal Hub

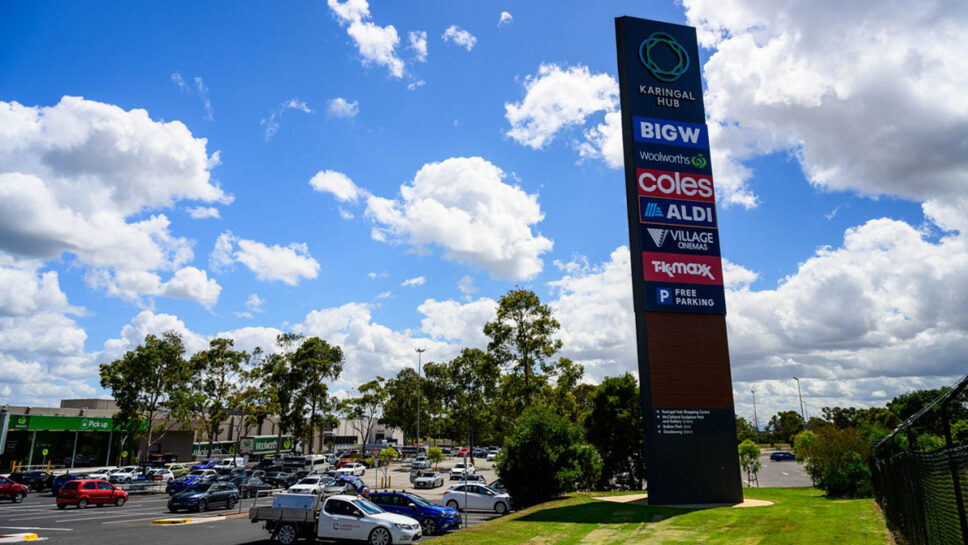
Pylon electronic sign of Karingal Hub

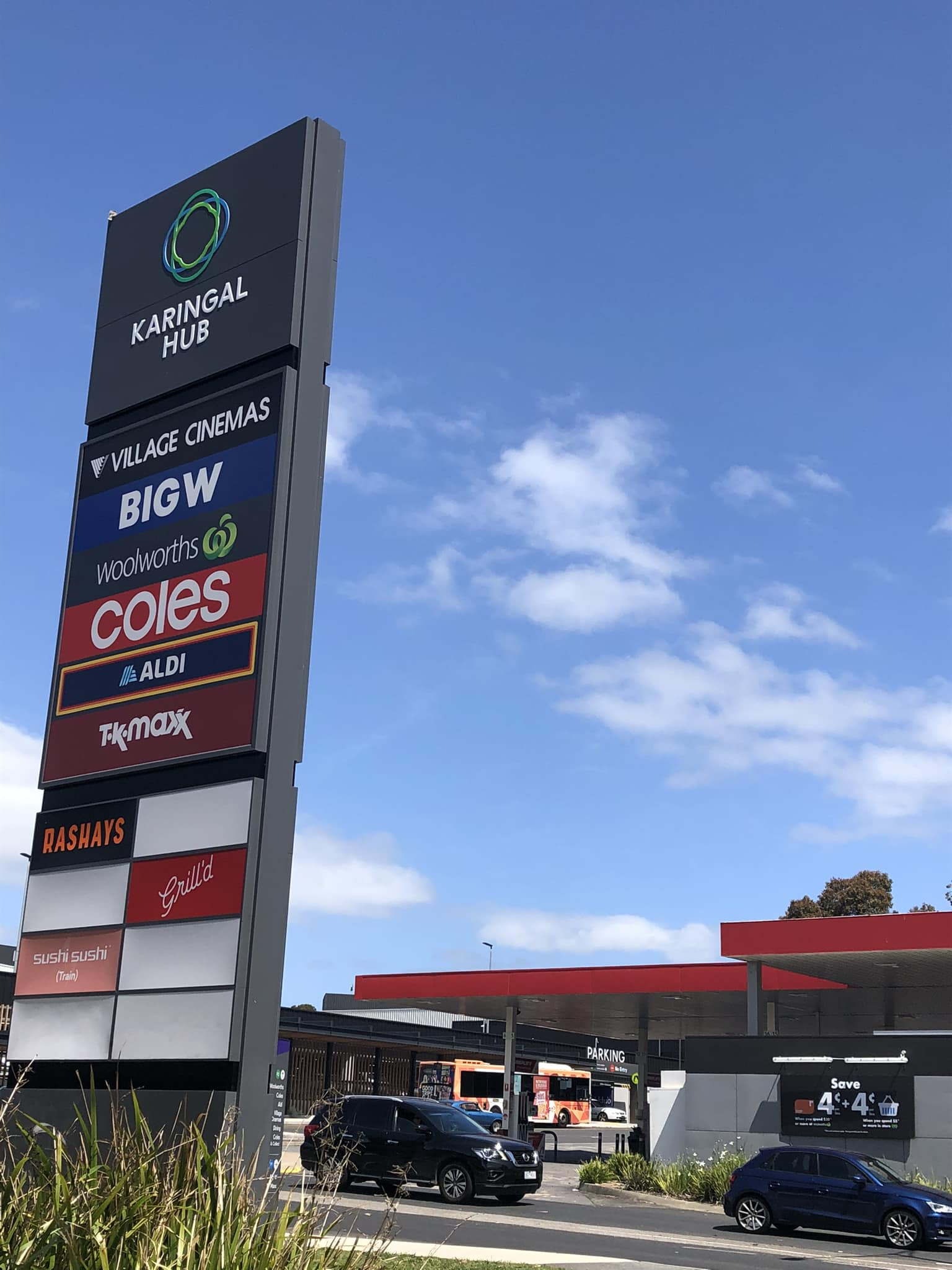
Karingal Hub sign outside the new "Town Square"
