= Frankston Power Centre =

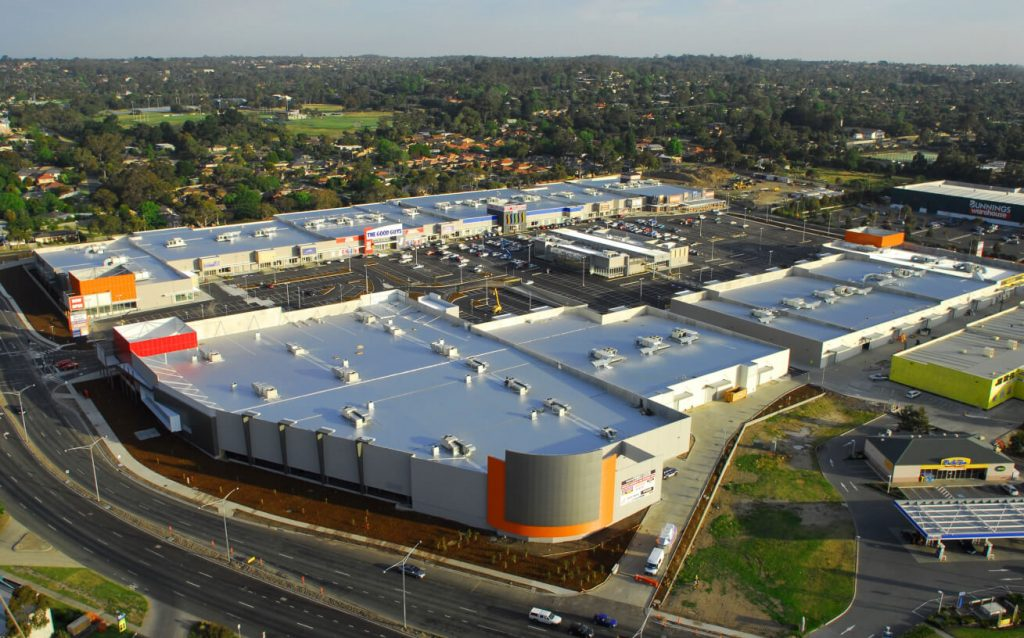
- Location: Frankston, Victoria, Australia
- Coordinates: 38.14852285018997°S 145.13781173493754°E
- Address: 111 Cranbourne Road, Frankston, Victoria
- Opened: 2009
- Previous names: Frankston Homemaker Centre
- Owner: Spotlight Group
- Num. of stores: ~30
- Floors: 1
- Parking: 875 (+425 underground)
- Website: frankstonpowercentre.com.au

The Frankston Power Centre, also colloquially known as "The Power Centre" (previously the Frankston Homemaker Centre), is a hard goods retail park run by Spotlight Group within the approximate centre of Frankston, being around 40 kilometres south of Melbourne's CBD. The complex comprises 30 large format independent stores, including parking for 1300 vehicles (including 425 underground parking spaces). Across from the complex are stores such as the hardware superstore Bunnings and JB Hi-Fi, but these are not run or owned by the Frankston Power Centre. The Power Centre is located at the crossroads of three major arterials; Cranbourne Road, McMahons Road and the Frankston Freeway. The site also features a food court at its geographical centre with adjacent parking.

== History ==
The area of the Frankston Power Centre was formerly a suburban district of Frankston with 132 residential properties, in what is the nominal geographic centre of Frankston.

Peninsula Power Management bought this land at around 90,000 m^{2} (963,445 sq ft). They turned it into its current development at an estimated cost of $60 million in 2008, finishing construction in 2009. It features 45,000 m^{2} (481723 sq ft) of bulky goods retail facilities.

Today, the park is owned by the Spotlight Group, who features a store inside the centre.

Since 2016, a plan for a major revamp of the retail park has circulated. The proposal would have involved a children's entertainment area, upgraded food court centre, and more in the centre of the complex. The owners however, have expressed concerns on what would next occur, referring to the unpredictability of the future for the centre, and thus future construction has been halted.

In 2019 another planned development was the proposal to build a supermarket at the site of the Spotlight and Forty-Winks stores, however the plan was scrapped due to "negative economic impact on the ongoing viability of the supermarkets and businesses in the vicinity of the proposed development," referring to the COVID-19 crisis at the time and nearby centres such as the Towerhill developments south of the Frankston Power Centre as well as the nearby Karingal Hub and Bayside shopping malls.

== Retailers ==
Retailers at the Frankston Power Centre include a variety of specialty stores, hardware stores, and more.

Major retailers include The Good Guys, Harvey Norman, Freedom, Spotlight and Anaconda.

It also includes minor retailers including Forty Winks, Petbarn, AMart, Adairs, Harris Scarfe, Nick Scali, Carpet Call, and more. It also includes a minor food court within its centre, with minor retailers within.

== Accessibility and Location ==
It can be accessed via car, bus and train, through certain routes. These routes include parking spaces accessible from Gertrude Street, McMahons Road in addition to Cranbourne Road. In addition to this, a bus service serves the location, with routes 789, 790 and 791 respectively.

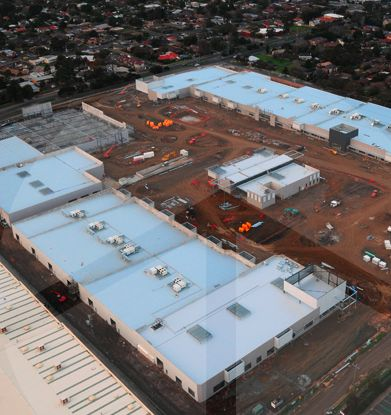
Frankston Power Centre under construction

The Leawarra Station, situated on the Stony Point Line of the Melbourne Train Network is approximately 500 metres away from the centre. This connection to the station will become even more effective once the electrification of the line is completed.

The Frankston Power Centre is located directly in the middle of Bayside Shopping Centre and Karingal Hub Shopping Centre, the two main shopping centres in the Frankston Suburb. In addition to this, the intersection the retail park is situated in features multiple fuel stations such as 7-Eleven and United Petroleum as well as a Subway and Carwash.

== Incidents ==
3 October 2019, at 6:40am, a car purposefully rammed into the Power Centres' Food Court doors, attempting to steal an ATM. It is currently unknown how much money they got away with, due to them escaping on foot. The perpetrators were likely inspired by the successful attacks on the nearby Peninsula Homemaker Centre a month prior in Mornington.
