= E&S =

E&S may refer to:

- Evans & Sutherland, an American computer firm
- Express & Star, a regional evening newspaper in Britain
- E&S Music, a record company founded by Simon Cowell
- E&S (supermarket), a Cypriot supermarket and hypermarket brand
- E. & S. Trading Co. (Discounts) Pty. Ltd., an Australian appliance and fixture retailer
