= Safeway (Australia) =

Supermarket chain

Australian Safeway Pty Ltd

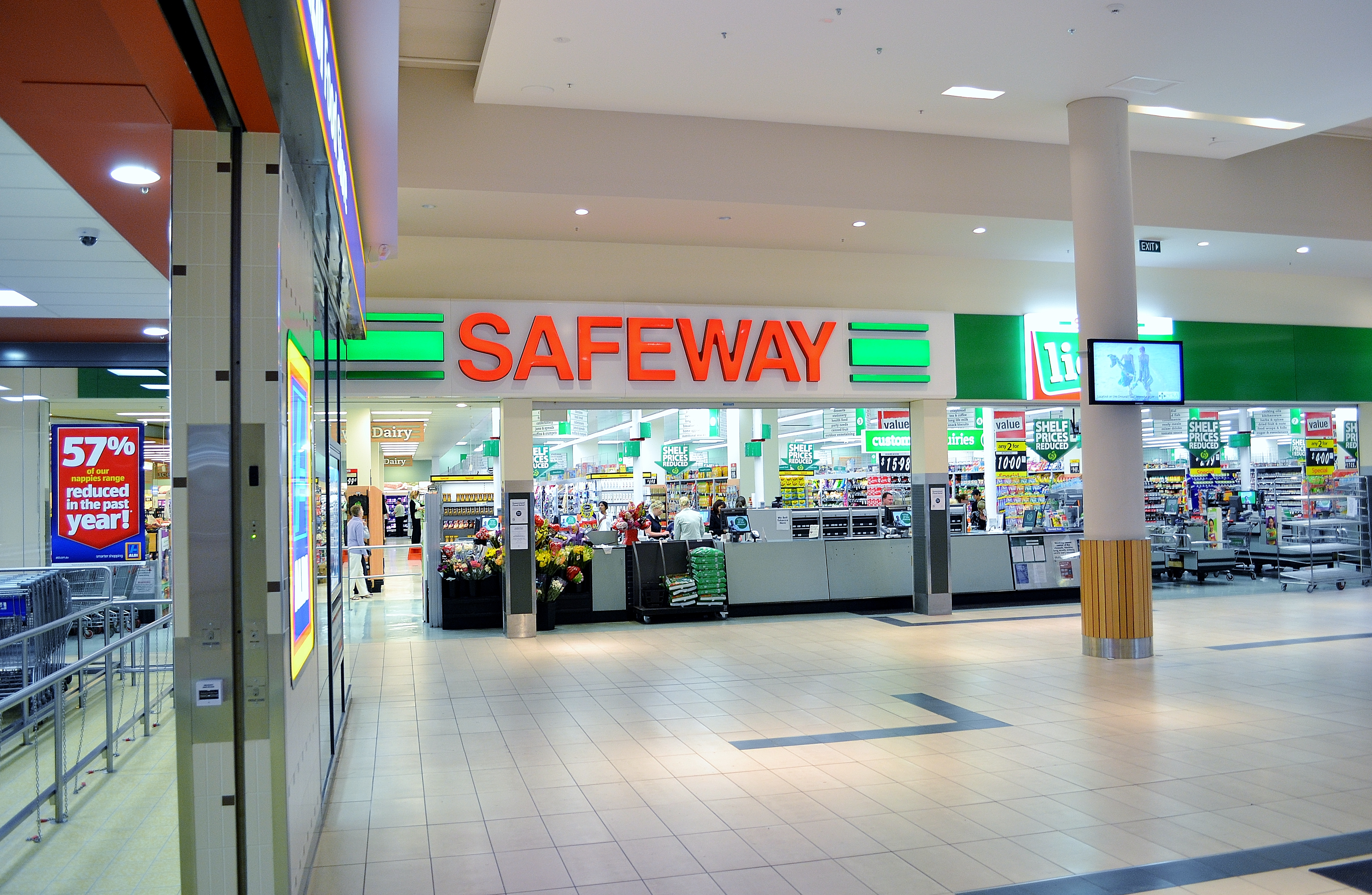
- Safeway and Safeway Liquor stores at Bayside Shopping Centre
- Type: Subsidiary
- Industry: Retail
- Founded: 1963; 63 years ago
- Defunct: 2017; 9 years ago
- Fate: Rebrand to Woolworths announced 2008; 18 years ago
- Headquarters: Mulgrave, Victoria, Australia
- Number of locations: 187 stores (2008)
- Parent: Woolworths Limited

Australian Safeway Pty Ltd (trading as Safeway Supermarkets) was a chain of supermarkets in Australia from 1963 to 2017. The supermarkets were initially part of Safeway Inc. but were absorbed by Woolworths Limited (now Woolworths Group) in 1985. On 22 August 2008, Woolworths Limited announced it would discontinue the Safeway name, and former Safeway stores were rebranded to Woolworths or closed. The final Safeway store to be rebranded was Wodonga, occurring on 6 June 2017.

== History ==
=== Early years ===
The American company Safeway Inc. entered the Australian grocery market in 1962 with the purchase of three Pratt's Supermart stores in Victoria. J.R.W. "Bill" Pratt purchased his father's supermarket in Frankston in 1946, and he also owned stores in Mornington (acquired from John Fyffe's estate in 1946), and Chelsea (opened in 1953). He became a pioneer of retail strategies and self-service in supermarkets.

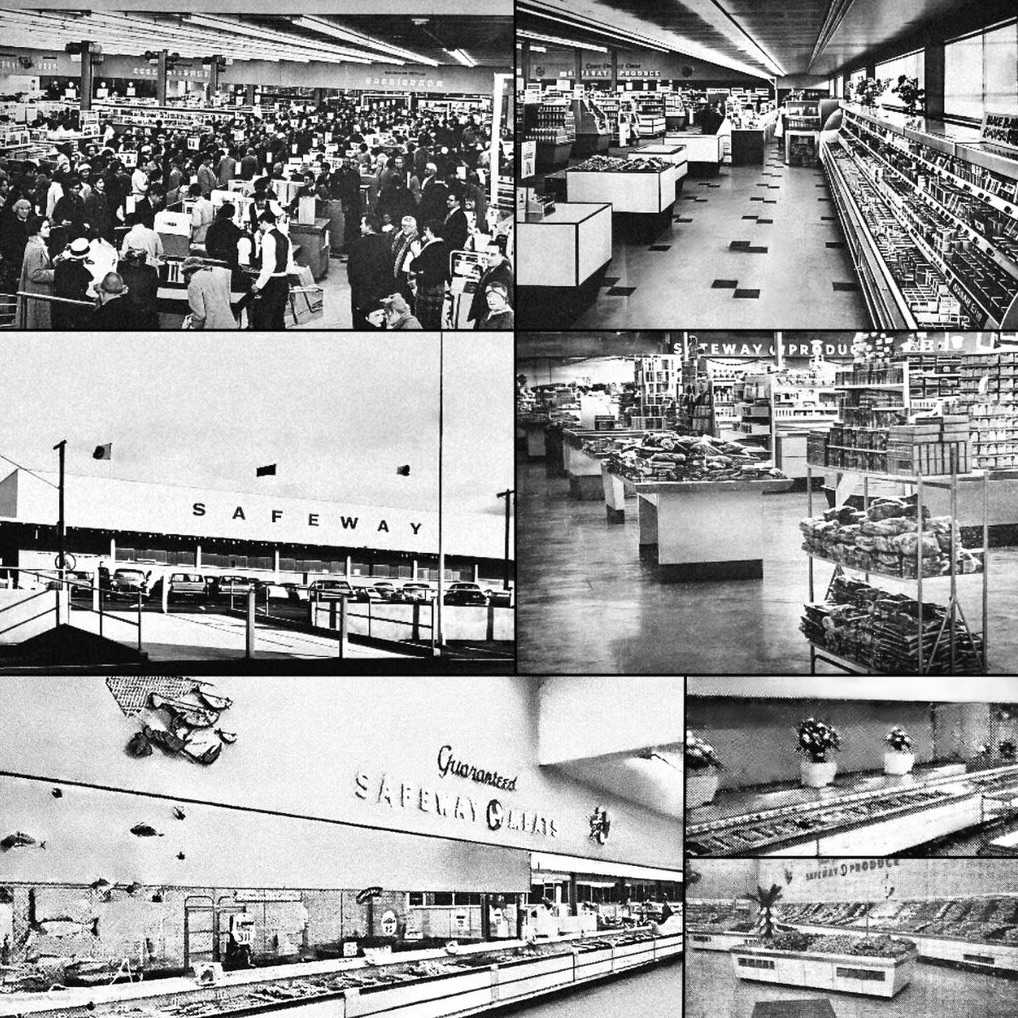
Australia's first Safeway, Forest Hill (1964)

Representatives of Safeway Inc. became interested in Pratt's growing business whilst on a trip in Australia, and in 1963 Pratt's three stores were purchased by Safeway Inc. The stores continued to operate as Pratt's Supermart for two years until a copyright dispute was resolved.

Australia's first Safeway-branded store was at the Forest Hills Shopping Centre in Melbourne's outer east. Opened by Graham Kennedy on 30 June 1964, it was the country's largest all-food supermarket. The second supermarket opened to similar fanfare at Croydon's Arndale Shopping Centre on 9 November 1964. Unlike Forest Hills, the Croydon supermarket was built with Safeway's iconic "Marina style" curved roof.

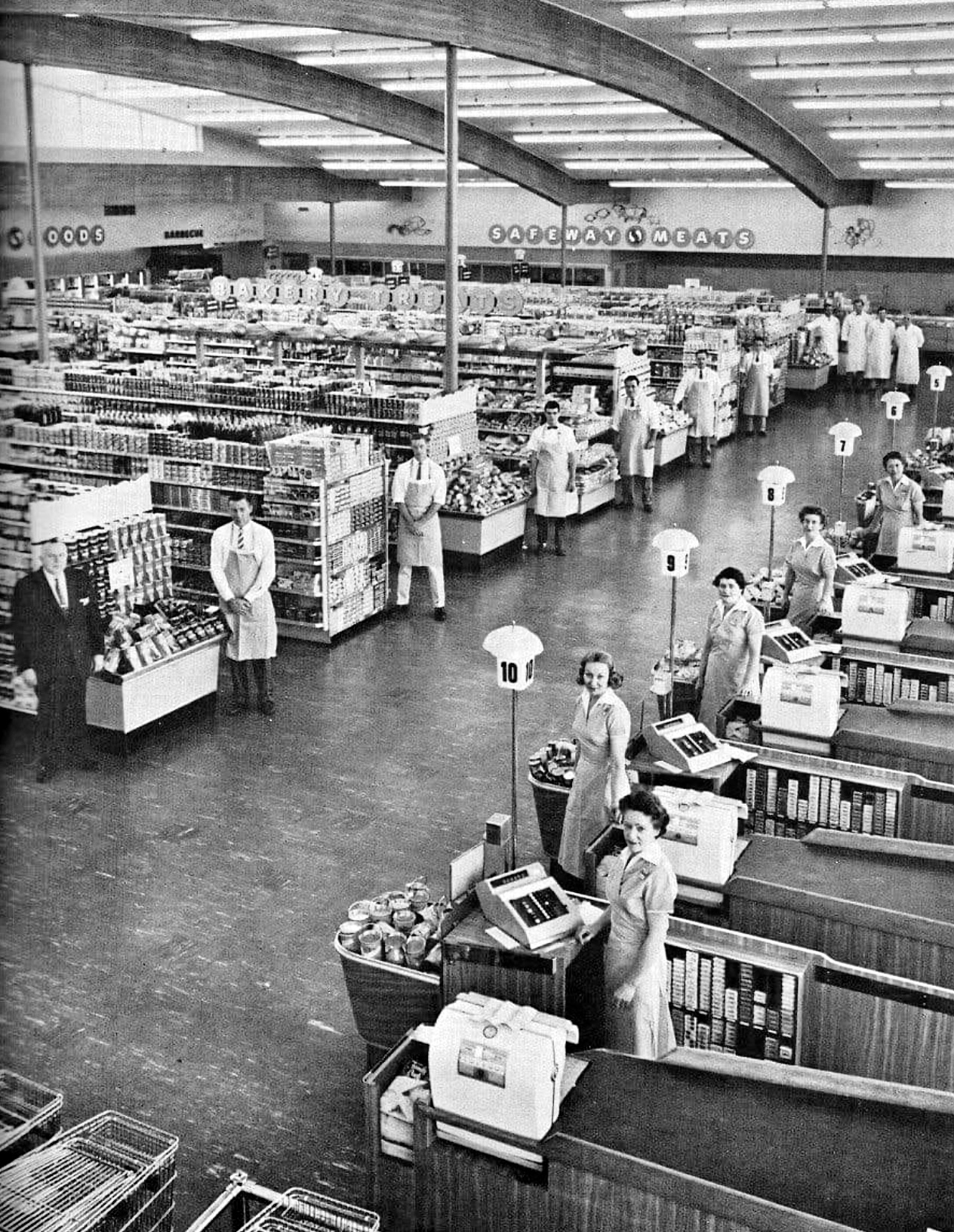
Supermarket staff (1965)

Pratt continued to work at his stores, and in 1967 became the head of the Australian division of Safeway Inc.

=== Expansion ===
Australian Safeway Pty Ltd, formerly a wholly owned subsidiary of Safeway Inc., reported losses in its first three years due to expansion and purchase of property. The chain expanded to New South Wales in 1971, where the shops were called "Red S" due to a trademark conflict with Saveway which was owned by Woolworths. The first New South Wales store was at Cabramatta, followed by Merrylands and Liverpool.

By 1979, there were 12 Safeway stores in New South Wales and 52 in Victoria. Safeway further expanded into Queensland in 1981 and acquired supermarket chain Jack the Slasher (subsequently called Food For Less). By 1985 the chain had grown to 126 supermarkets trading under the Safeway banner across Victoria, New South Wales, and Queensland. The head office was formerly located adjacent to the distribution centre on Wellington Road, Mulgrave, Victoria.

=== Acquisition by Woolworths ===
In 1985 Woolworths Limited successfully acquired the Australian subsidiary of Safeway, Inc. In the agreement, Woolworths Limited acquired all of the Safeway stores and the naming rights in exchange for a 19.99% equity interest in Woolworths Limited. The purchase included 126 stores in Victoria, New South Wales and Queensland. Bill Pratt, the chairman and managing director of Australian Safeway Pty Ltd, and Peter Magowan, the chairman and chief executive officer of Safeway Inc., were also appointed to the Woolworths board of directors.

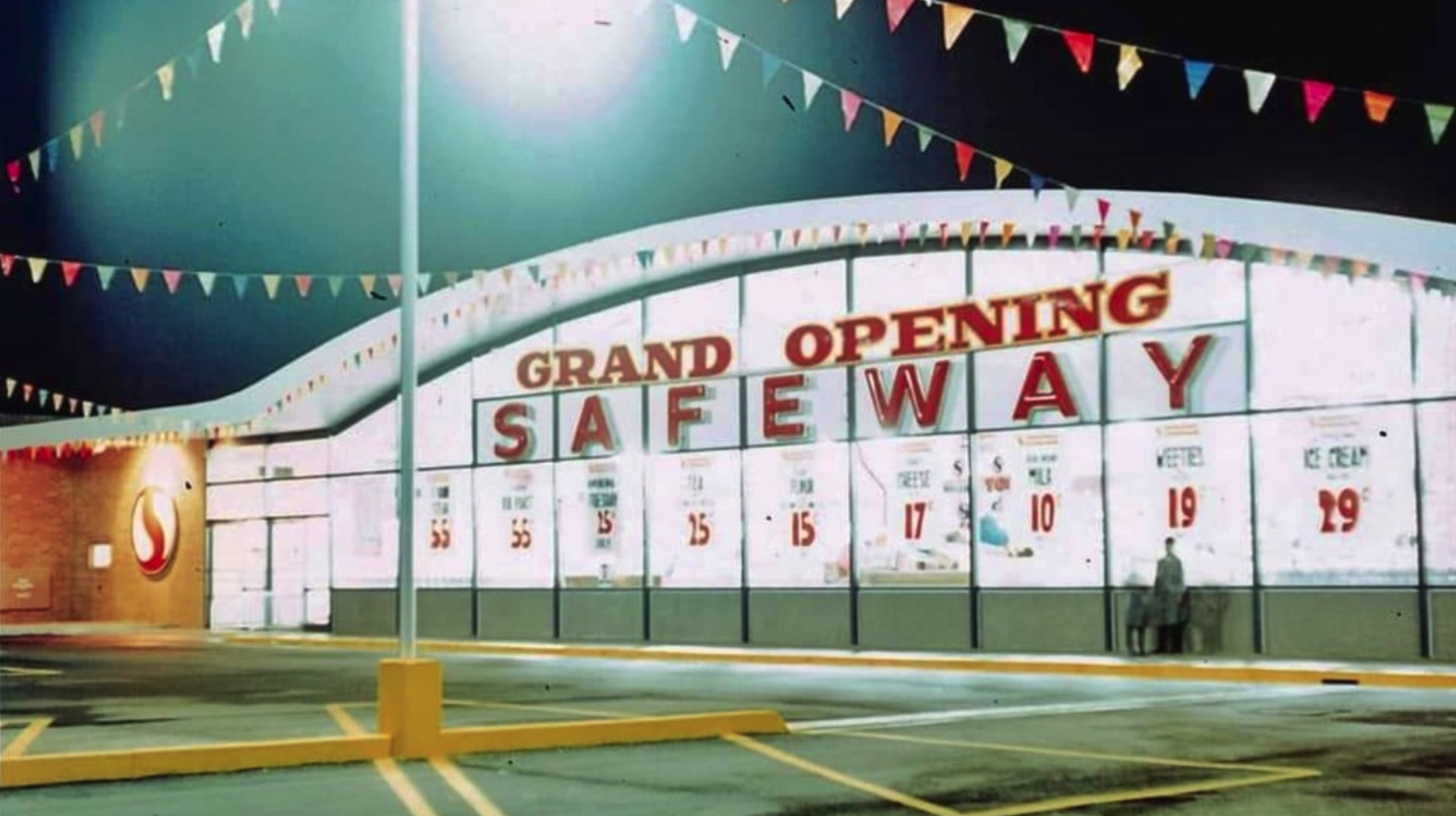
Iconic "Marina style" roof, Boronia (1967)

The annual profit of Woolworths Limited rose from $8 million to $136 million in two years as they served 10 million customers. Following the purchase by Woolworths, the Safeway stores in New South Wales and Queensland were renamed as Woolworths Supermarkets. However, the Safeway stores in Victoria retained their name, and Woolworths stores in Victoria were transferred to the Safeway banner (with the exception of the Victorian stores of Mildura, Belgrave and Karingal).

The store in the border town of Albury, New South Wales also remained as Safeway. During the 1980s and 1990s the Mildura stores moved from Woolworths to Safeway and back again, and the Karingal Woolworths store became Safeway in the late 1990s. In Victoria, the Safeway brand also followed Woolworths Supermarkets' progression into liquor trading as Safeway Liquor, and into petrol trading as Caltex Safeway. In December 1986, Safeway Inc. sold its share of 19.99%, and the naming rights of Safeway in Australia, to Rainbow Corporation of New Zealand. In 1987, Woolworths and Safeway Supermarkets launched "The Fresh Food People" campaign, adopting a uniform slogan and marketing strategy for both brands.

=== Rebranding of Safeway to Woolworths ===
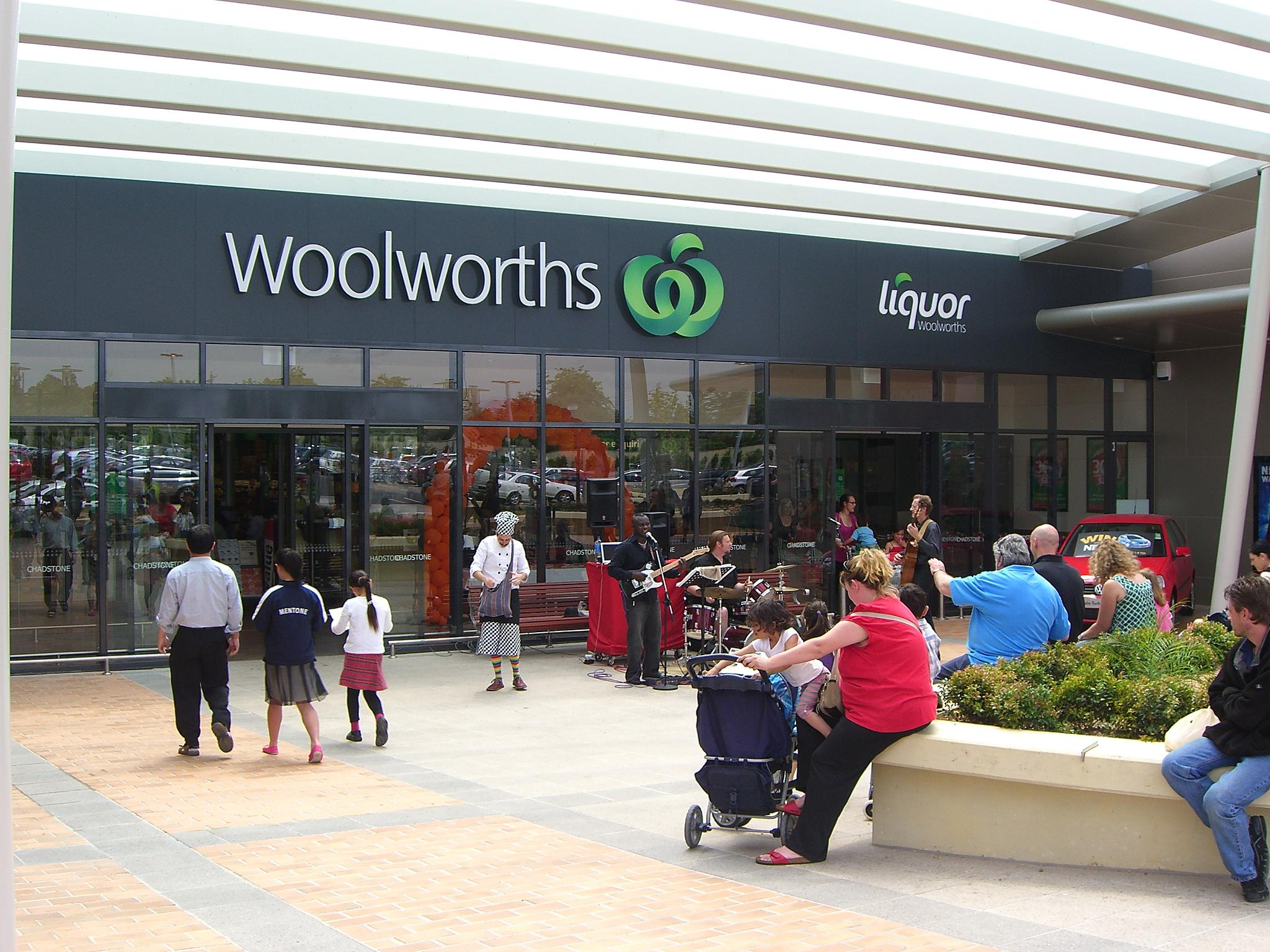
Melbourne's first newly branded Woolworths supermarket and Woolworths Liquor in Chadstone.

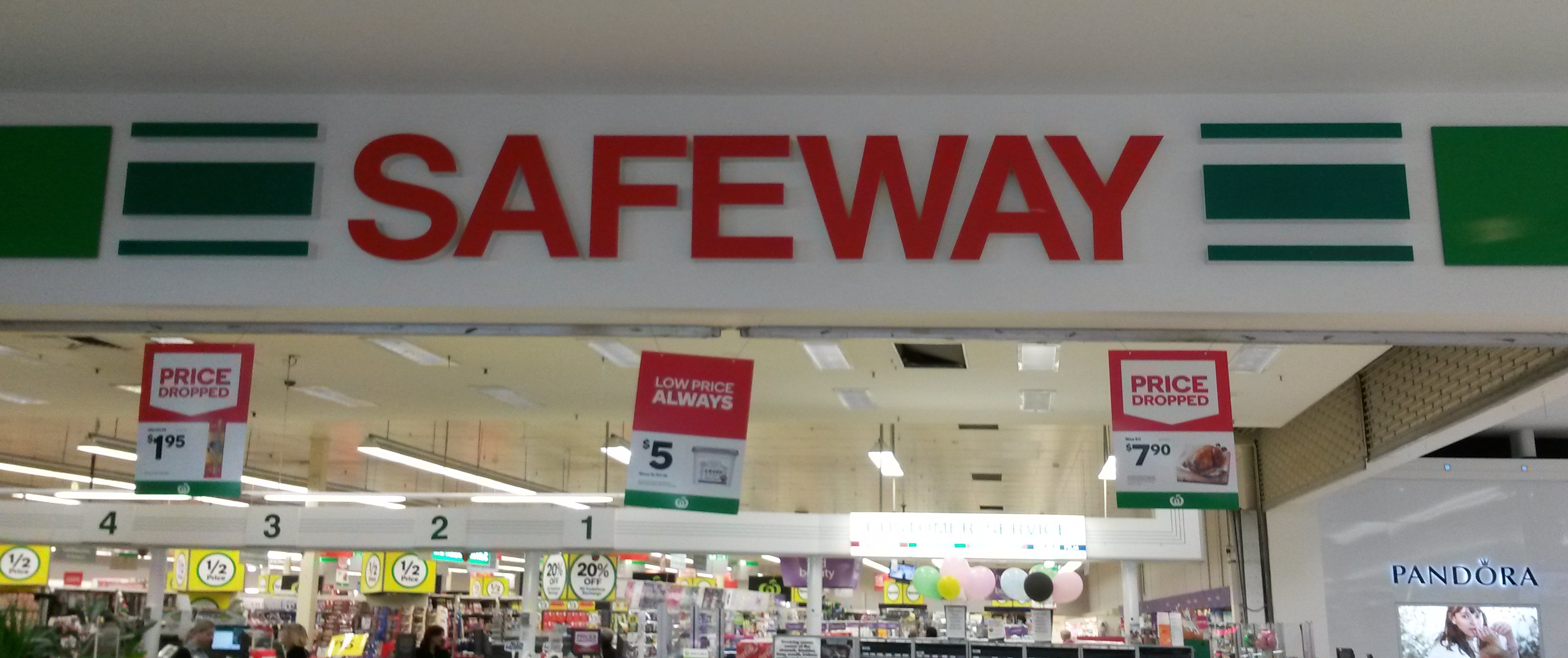
Safeway branding at Pacific Epping

On 22 August 2008, Woolworths Limited announced it would rename all Safeway supermarkets in Victoria to Woolworths to unite all of its supermarkets under a common brand.

The rebrand included a new logo and design for stores in all states, created by Hans Hulsbosch. The previous logo, which had been in use for 21 years, was replaced with a green apple peel emblem representing the "W" in Woolworths with the addition of a stylised leaf to suggest fresh produce. The company's slogan, "The Fresh Food People", which is known throughout Australia, was maintained as a part of the new branding.

Woolworths indicated that Safeway supermarkets at Camberwell and Preston would be among the first to be re-branded. However, a newly constructed supermarket at Chadstone Shopping Centre became the first location of the rebranded Woolworths to open in the state.

The entire rebranding process of all 187 stores had an expected completion date of five years, but several stores were still operating as Safeway well past 2013 which included Dingley Village, Monbulk, Carnegie, Balaclava, North Blackburn, and Dandenong Plaza. On 6 June 2017, the final Safeway supermarket in Wodonga was rebranded as Woolworths, ending the Safeway brand after 54 years in Australia.
