= Karingal, Victoria =

Coordinates: 38°08′45″S 145°09′29″E

Karingal
- Suburb
- Country: Australia
- State: Victoria
- City: Frankston
- LGA: City of Frankston
- Established: 1854

Government
  - State electorate: Frankston
  - Federal division: Dunkley

Area
  - Total: 8 km^{2} (3.1 sq mi)

Population
  - Total: 13,950
  - Density: 1,740/km^{2} (4,520/sq mi)
- Postcode: 3199
Suburbs around Karingal
Kananook	Frankston North	Carrum Downs
Frankston	Karingal	Langwarrin
Frankston South	Frankston South	Langwarrin

Karingal is a local area within the suburb of Frankston located in Melbourne, Victoria in Australia. It is in the local government area of the City of Frankston (app. 45 km southeast of the Melbourne CBD). The locality has no predefined borders, but it is generally accepted as the region between Ashleigh Avenue, The Pines Flora and Fauna Reserve and west of the Mornington Peninsula Freeway.

== History ==
European settlement of the area now known as Karingal is first recorded in 1847, with the first wooden house and in 1855, the first brick house, both being the first in Frankston. Agricultural and pastoral land use continued in the area into the 1960s. Frankston East Primary School would be built in the latter time. Frankston East High School opened in temporary accommodation in 1959. For two years, this included a Scouts Hall, Yacht Club, Life Saving Club and the rear of the Pier Hotel. In 1961 the school moved to a permanent site on Ashleigh Avenue, near Jacana Avenue, and its name was changed to Karingal High. Enrolments reached 1,000 by 1969, and in 1990 it was rebadged as a secondary college. In 1997 declining enrolments led to a ‘merger’ with Ballam Park Secondary to form the dual-campus Karingal Park Secondary College. This was a short-term arrangement though, as the school consolidated on the former Ballam Park campus in 1999 and the Ashleigh Avenue campus was closed. The former Karingal High site was cleared to make way for Regis Frankston Aged Care, as well as a housing estate. The surviving campus was renamed McClelland Secondary College in 2009.

In the late 1960s, residential development spread from Frankston East spread east. These eastern lands were subdivided and established largely as an AV Jennings housing estate, consisting of about 3000 homes by the mid-1970s. These lands are the first to not fit into the traditional grid / right-angled street layouts in all of Australia. It was dubbed "Karingal" as a part of this development, a Koori word which translates to "happy home" or "happy camp" in English. During this the Karingal Post Office opened on 1 April 1964.

Karingal Hub Shopping Centre was developed by Jennings Properties and opened in 1978. It features big-box stores with specialty stores packed between. It underwent a large redevelopment in 2021, creating a 'town square' for the locality's residents in addition to a multitude of more stores.

=== Ballam Park ===
==== Homestead ====
The "Ballam Ballam" estate was home to prominent early settlers of the Frankston area, the Liardets. Frank Liardet, son of early hotelier and artist Wilbraham Liardet, established the property in 1854. In the 1910s, responding to the suggestion that Frankston was named after Frank Liardet, Wilbraham's grandson stated that the family believed it had been named after the early white settler Charles Franks. The original homestead "Ballam Park" still stands in Karingal today, and is now heritage-listed. It is also home to the Frankston Historical Society, which conducts regular guided tours of the homestead.

==== Amenities & Park ====
Ballam Park is an extensive recreational area with new facilities including a new $3 million dollar playground, toilets, drinking fountains, BBQ amenities, dog parks, soccer and athletic fields, with amenities for football (Australian rules), netball, cricket, tennis, and more.

== Schools ==
Primary

- Ballam Park Primary School
- Karingal Heights Primary School
- Karingal Primary School
- Frankston East Primary School (debated)
- St John's Catholic Primary School (debated)

Secondary

- McClelland College
- Naranga school for special education

== Shopping ==
Karingal Hub Shopping Centre located on the southeastern edges of Karingal is Frankston's second largest shopping complex, (the largest being the Bayside Shopping Centre in the Frankston CBD). It features a Woolworths supermarket, an Aldi grocery store, a Coles supermarket, a Big W department store, a fresh produce market and 120 speciality stores. The centre boasts an entertainment precinct, called 'Karingal Town Square', with restaurants, a pub and a 12 screen Village Cinema complex. Karingal Town Square is also home to one of the three V max "super screens" in Australia. Its new renovations in 2021 boosted the frequency of consumers to the centre and invites more people to the region every day.

Karingal's first shopping centre, now known as Karingal Village Shops, is still located on Ashleigh Avenue, near Karingal Drive. At the turn of the century, a large section of the earlier shopping centre was redeveloped, replacing the old supermarket with a larger one and the local service station with a bottle shop. Karingal Post Office continues to operate as part of the new complex. In 2021, major retailer Coles left the site in favor of a new location within Karingal Hub Shopping Centre.

== Infrastructure ==
=== Transport ===
Karingal's main arterial road is Karingal Drive, which runs through the heart of the suburb, from Skye Road to Cranbourne Road. Ashleigh Avenue is another key road, which runs from Karingal Drive into Frankston East. On Karingal's northern border, Skye Road is the connection with Frankston North, Seaford and Langwarrin. Cranbourne Road touches Karingal's southernmost edge, and connects it to the Frankston CBD. The road additionally accommodates road travel to the neighbouring suburb of Langwarrin and terminates in the City of Casey suburb of Cranbourne. Metropolitan bus services run along all of these roads, connecting Karingal with the Frankston CBD and its neighbouring suburbs.

Another major transport route, Peninsula Link (also known as the Frankston By-Pass) opened in January 2013. This divides Karingal and Langwarrin, however provides access to the rest of Greater Melbourne, and to the Mornington Peninsula and is a general positive for the area.

=== Health ===
Two hospitals are in and around Karingal, the St. John of God Rehabilitation Hospital and the Peninsula Private Hospital (debated).

== Sport ==
Karingal Football Club, known as the "Karingal Bulls" is an Australian Football team competing in the 2nd division of the Mornington Peninsula Nepean Football League. Their home ground is located in Ballam Park alongside the Karingal Cricket Club. Ballam Park also have soccer and rugby fields, and an athletics track where Little Athletics and other events are held. Recent developments have been made to the main sporting precincts in Ballam Park.

== See also ==
- Frankston, Victoria – the suburb of which Karingal is a locality.
- City of Frankston – the local government area of which Karingal is a part.
- List of people from Frankston – notable people from the City of Frankston (including Karingal).
