= Berkeley Cinemas =

Brand of cinemas in New Zealand

The Hoyts Group
- Type: Private
- Industry: Film Exhibition, Film Distribution, Cinema Advertising
- Founded: 1926
- Headquarters: Sydney, Australia
- Area served: Australia, New Zealand
- Key people: Delfin Fernandez (Group CEO), Mathew Garelli (National Operations Manager – Hoyts NZ)
- Products: Hoyts
- Parent: Pacific Equity Partners
- Subsidiaries: Hoyts Distribution
- Website: Hoyts.co.nz

Berkeley Cinemas refers to a two-complex premium brand of cinemas owned by Hoyts Pty Australia. Previously owned by Everard Entertainment, the Berkeley Cinema Group was one of the largest cinema chains in Auckland, New Zealand, with complexes in Mission Bay, Hibiscus Coast, Takapuna, and Botany Downs. After being bought out by Hoyts Pty Australia in May 2010, its Hibiscus Coast and Botany Downs complexes were rebranded to become Hoyts complexes, leaving Mission Bay and Takapuna as the "Berkeley" Cinemas.

Berkeley Cinemas was the first cinema chain in Auckland to introduce higher-end seating towards the rear of individual theatres (called the "Circle Lounge"), offering restaurant amenities for a higher ticket price. Before Hoyts built its Guinness World Record breaking screen at Sylvia Park in 2007, the Botany Downs complex hosted New Zealand's largest cinema screen, "The Sumo Screen", with a size equivalent to 519 42" screens, and a theatre capacity of 491 seats.

The Mission Bay complex was Berkeley's first and original complex, and has four cinemas ranging in seating capacity from 80 to 100 seats, and has a lounge-style bar. The Takapuna complex, which opened in 2001, replaced the original Tudor theatre (which had one cinema) with a new four-auditorium theatre, bar and restaurant (previously Akdenis, then Onion Johnny, now Marvel Grill). The complex was the first in Auckland to implement a telephone reservation system, and has four cinemas ranging in seating capacity from 78 to 152 seats.
