= Bayside Shopping Centre =

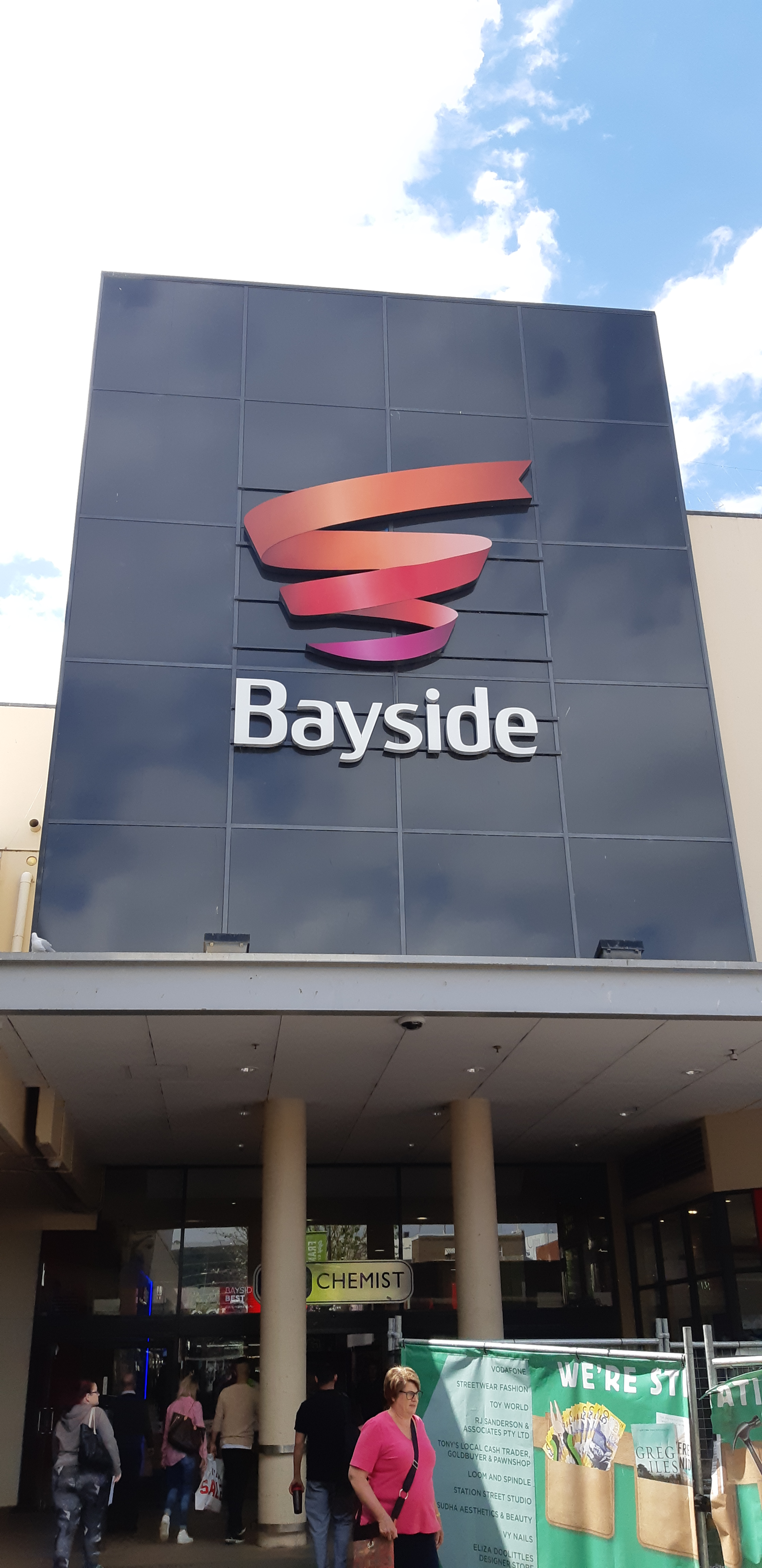
- Outside view of Bayside SC
- Location: Frankston, Victoria, Australia
- Coordinates: 38°08′28″S 145°07′29″E
- Opened: 3 October 1972; 54 years ago
- Developer: National Mutual
- Manager: Vicinity Centres
- Owner: Vicinity Centres
- Architect: Hassell (2006 northern extension)
- Num. of stores: 241
- Num. of anchor tenants: 8
- Floor area: 88,843 m^{2} (956,298 sq ft)
- Floors: 3
- Parking: 3,452 spaces
- Website: baysidesc.com.au

Bayside Shopping Centre (colloquially known as "Bayside") is a regional shopping centre in Frankston, Victoria, Australia, approximately 40 kilometres (25 mi) south of Melbourne CBD. Since its opening in 1972, it has amassed a combined gross leasable area of 88,843 m^{2} (956298 sq ft), 3,452 parking spaces and over 200 retail outlets. The center consists of 5 distinct main sections, 3 of which operated independently before merging into a single megastore in the late 1990s.

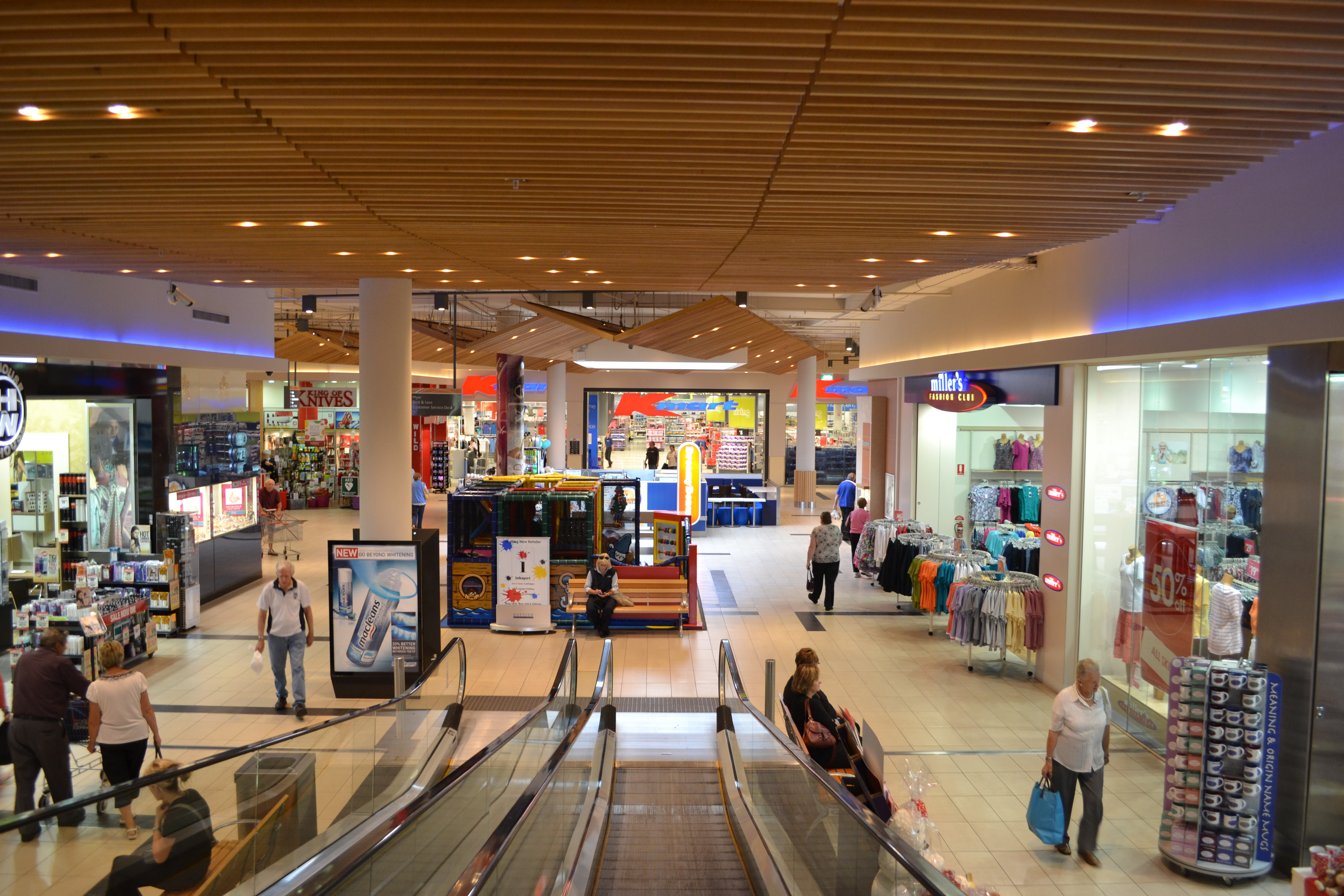
Level 1 interior, looking west toward Kmart

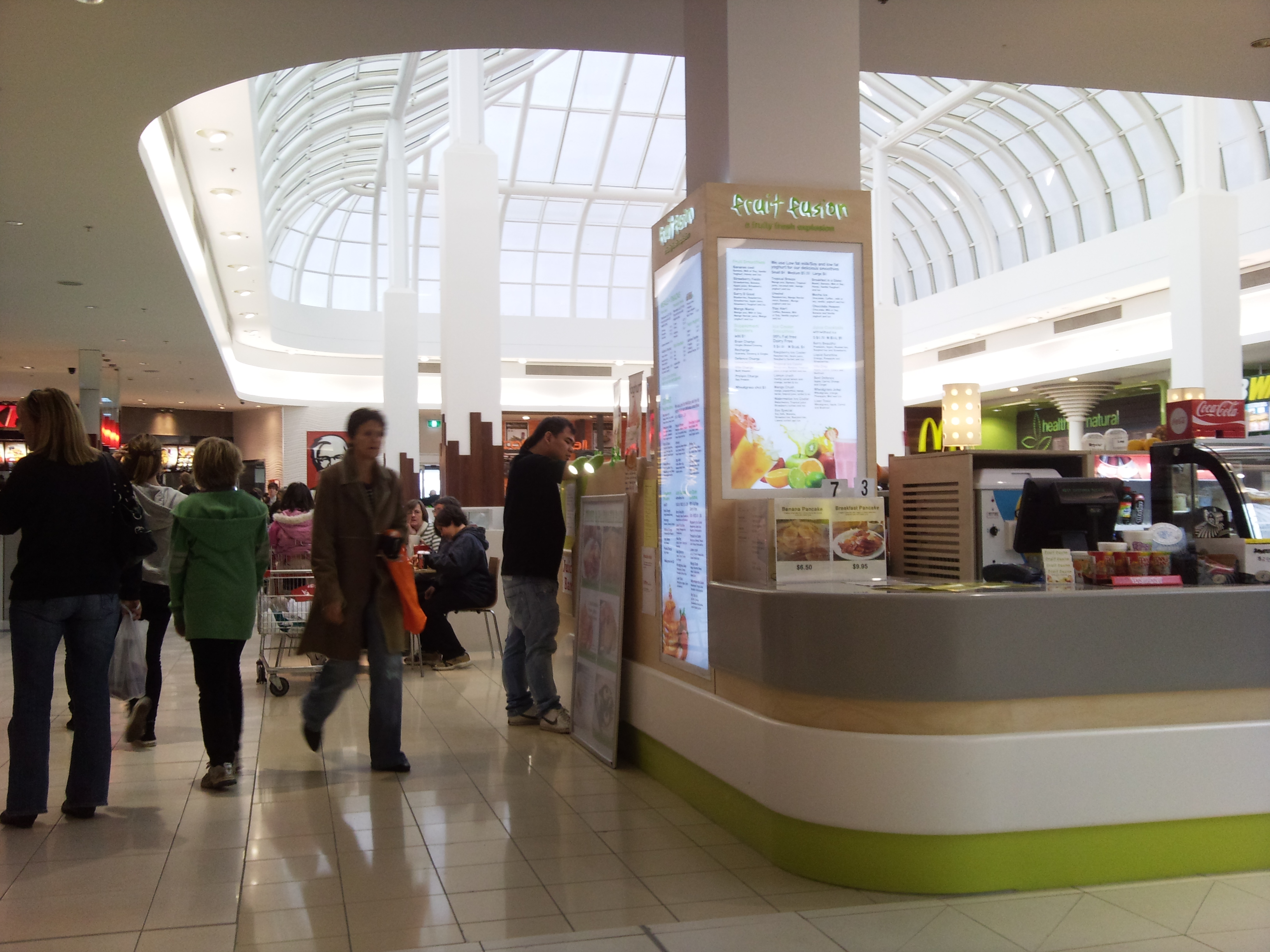
The former level 2 food court outside former Myer store, after the 2010–11 redevelopment

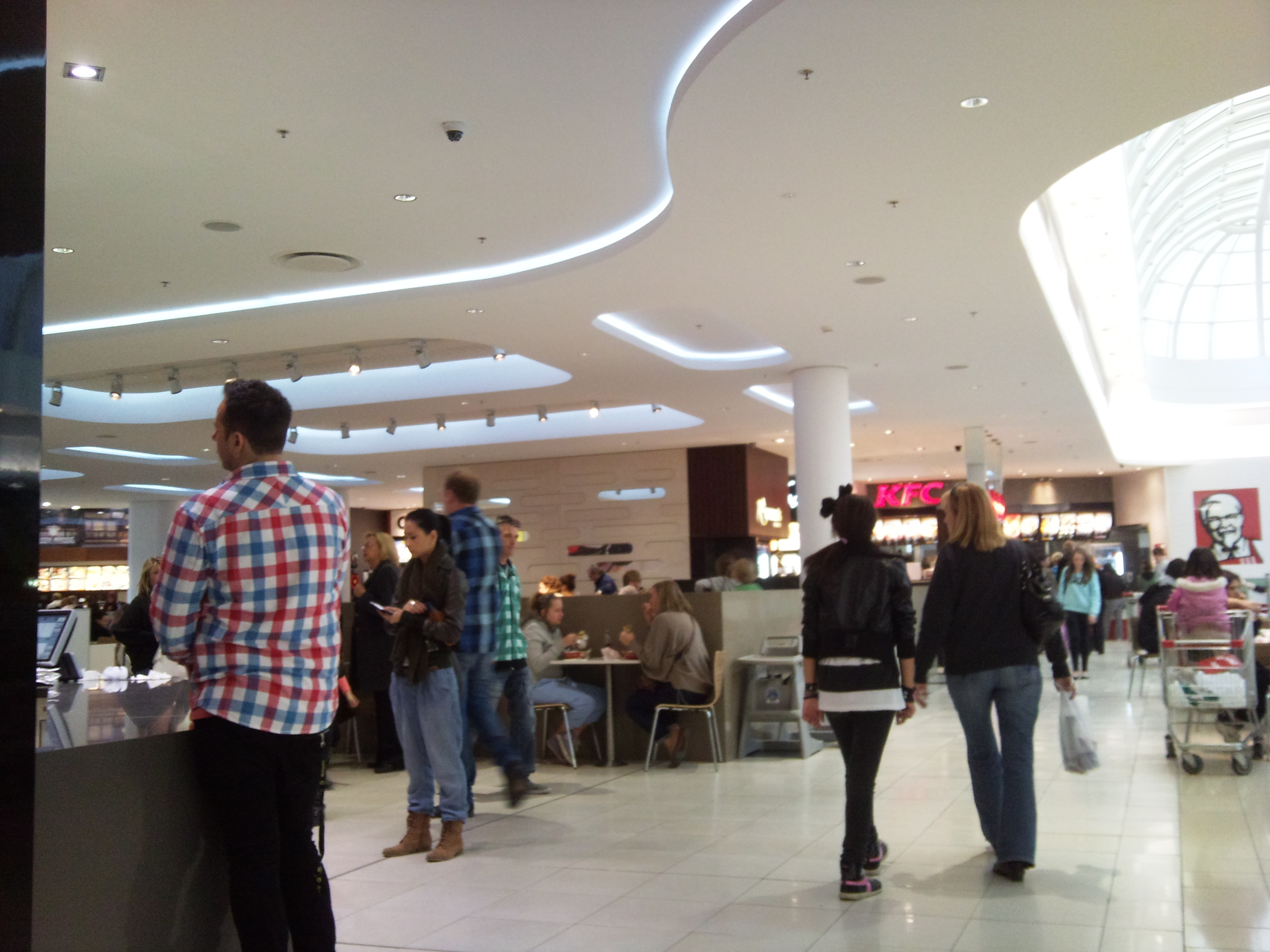
The extended level 2 food court outside former Myer store, after the 2010–11 redevelopment

== History ==
=== Early years ===
Frankston's CBD originally featured three distinct main shopping centres: Bayside, Balmoral Arcade and Quayside. These would later form into the Bayside Shopping Centre as known today.

The original Bayside Shopping Centre opened on 3 October 1972, located between Beach Street and Ross Smith Avenue. It launched with the anchor tenants of a Myer department store, a McEwans hardware store (now known as Bunnings, moved to the Frankston Power Centre), a Ritchies (IGA) supermarket and 52 speciality stores. It was owned by the National Mutual Life Association of Australasia.

Balmoral Arcade, a former distinct shopping centre, was developed in 1973 by Hanover Holdings at the western end of Station Street, between Shannon Street (now a pedestrian mall) and Key Street, opening with 19 speciality stores.

Quayside Shopping Centre debuted in 1991 in the area between the aforementioned stores, located on the former car-park between Ross Smith Avenue and Station Street. It featured a Target department store, Coles supermarket and 72 speciality stores. The Bayside and Quayside malls were now additionally linked by an enclosed pedestrian path straight through Ross Smith Avenue.

John Gandel who owned Quayside acquired Bayside and Balmoral during the late-1990s. Subsequent ownership transfers would place it under the administration of CFS Retail Property Trust (and later, Vicinity Centres). CFS Retail Property Trust would be the one upgrading the premises from now.

=== Growth ===
In 2004, Bayside underwent a $63 million redevelopment including a new multi-storey carpark and 55 new stores including a Kmart, Aldi and Woolworths. A second-floor bridge was also erected over Beach Street to accommodate pedestrian activity and traffic between the two sections. The development was completed and opened to the public in March 2006.

An entertainment precinct on Wells Street, accessible from the Shannon Street Mall, was constructed and featured a 12 screen Australian Multiplex Cinema complex (now run under Hoyts), a Strike Bowling Bar, Holey Moley and 10 restaurants/food outlets.

An upgrade in 2011 brought the combined total cost of development to AU$200 million since 1999, with the reconfiguration of tenancies including an entire level dedicated to fashion stores, a brand-new third-level food court and the addition of an Aldi supermarket in the 2004 aforementioned North building.

=== Upcoming and ongoing expansions ===
Another upgrade starting in 2023 removed the third-level food court and replaced much of the space with planned office suites, intended to be delivered alongside the company Hub Australia. These were new, modern, contemporary office suites located directly above the retail precinct. To accommodate such, the triple floor Myer store was closed down and replaced with a Revo Fitness and BounceINC on level 2, a UNIQLO store on level 1 and a division of its ground floor floor-area, leading to the establishment of TK Maxx, Rebel Sport and Foot Locker stores. The addition of Revo Fitness and BounceINC on Level 2 is due to the office spaces only being added where the former food court was, opposite Revo. The relocation of the TK Maxx and Rebel Sport stores also free up space for a new 8-storey office tower directly next to the centre that is yet to be constructed due to the lack of available tenants.

== Tenants ==
Bayside Shopping Centre has 88,843m² of floor space, comprising 241 stores over three levels serviced by 3,452 car spaces. The major retailers, which are located at either end of the centre, include Target, Kmart, Woolworths, Coles, Aldi and Hoyts cinema. The 'mini' major tenants also include UNIQLO, JB Hi-Fi, Strike Bowling Bar, TK Maxx, Rebel Sport, Chemist Warehouse, JD Sports, Foot Locker, Adidas, Revo Fitness, BOUNCEinc and more. Former tenants include Myer, Rivers, Lincraft, Best & Less and Toys R Us.

== Transport ==
Frankston Station is a 5 minute walk from Bayside Shopping Centre, running frequent trains on the Frankston railway line from Frankston all the way to Flinders Street (Via the City Loop), as well as Stony Point through a shuttle service.

Bayside Shopping Centre also has bus connections to Mornington East, Portsea, Pearcedale, Carrum and surrounding suburbs. It is served by Kinetic Melbourne with bus stops on the Nepean Highway and Dandenong Valley Highway.

Bayside also features a multi-level car-park with 3,452 spaces.

== Incidents ==
- On 30 March 2016, a power outage lasting 30 minutes led to a group of 20 adolescents to engage in a fight. Stores were placed into lockdown to protect property and keep patrons safe. It was revealed that the blackout was caused after a fire at a United Energy substation at the nearby Frankston Train Station earlier in the morning.
- On 21 December 2017, a gas cylinder exploded at the Bob Jane T-Marts' workshop just outside the centre shortly after 7 pm. Witnesses reported hearing multiple 'bangs' and seeing flames. The explosion occurred only two hours after a four-wheel drive automobile was driven into pedestrians at Flinders Street in the Melbourne CBD.
