= Cinépolis Chile =

Chilean cinema chain

- Industry: Cinema
- Founded: 1997
- Founder: Hoyts Group
- Headquarters: Santiago, Chile
- Area served: Chile
- Parent: Cinépolis
- Website: cinepolis.com/cl

Cinépolis Chile is a Chilean cinema chain. It was founded in 1997 by the Australian Hoyts chain (as Cine Hoyts SpA). The chain's theaters were sold to Chilefilms in 2010, becoming the largest movie theatre chain in the country. In 2015, Hoyts Chile was acquired by the Mexican giant Cinépolis (Latin America's largest movie chain) and the Hoyts brand gradually disappeared from the country. Also that year the chain opened the country's first commercial IMAX theatre.
