= Hoyts =

Australian cinema chain

Hoyts Group
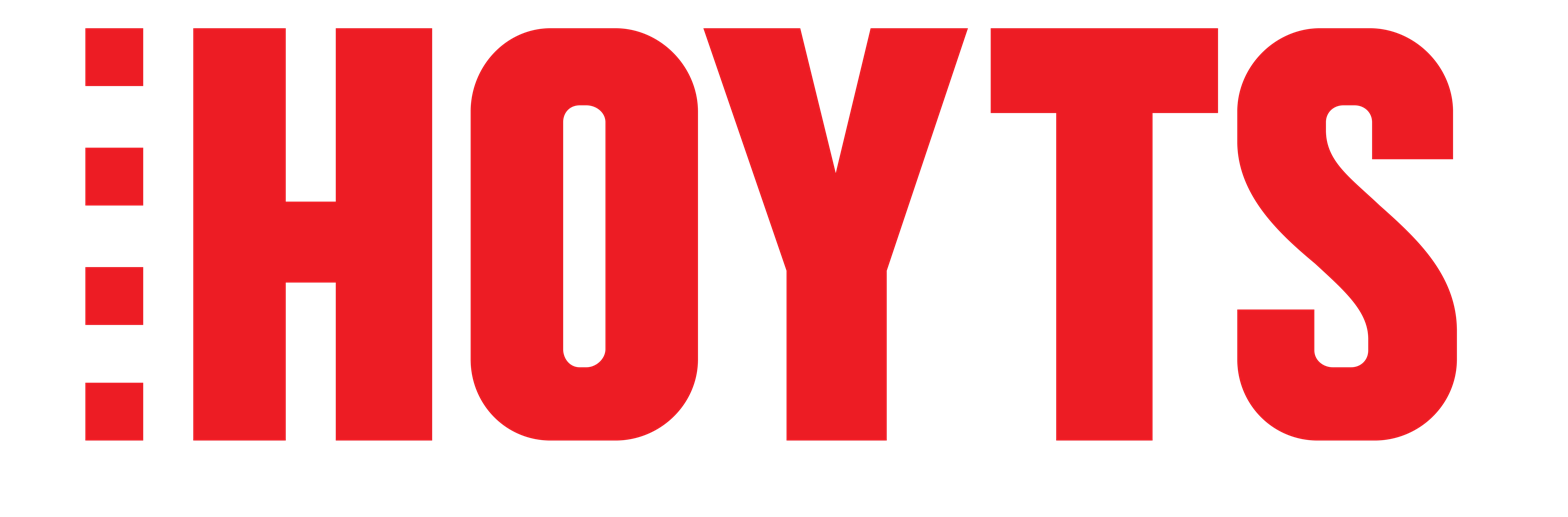
- Type: Subsidiary
- Industry: Film exhibition, film distribution, cinema advertising
- Founded: 1909; 117 years ago
- Headquarters: Sydney, Australia
- Area served: Australia, New Zealand
- Key people: Damian Keogh (CEO)
- Products: Hoyts Cinemas
- Number of employees: 4,000
- Parent: Ruyi Film
- Website: www.hoyts.com.au

The HOYTS Group, of companies in Australia and New Zealand includes HOYTS Cinemas, a cinema chain, and Val Morgan, which sells advertising on cinema screens and digital billboards.

The company was established by dentist Arthur Russell in Melbourne, Victoria, in 1908, showing films in a hired hall. After expansion into other states and several changes of ownership, the majority of Hoyts was acquired by a Chinese conglomerate, the Wanda Group, in 2015. As of 2022, Hoyts owned 46 multiplexes housing 412 screens, making it Australia's second-largest movie exhibitor after Event Cinemas.

== History ==
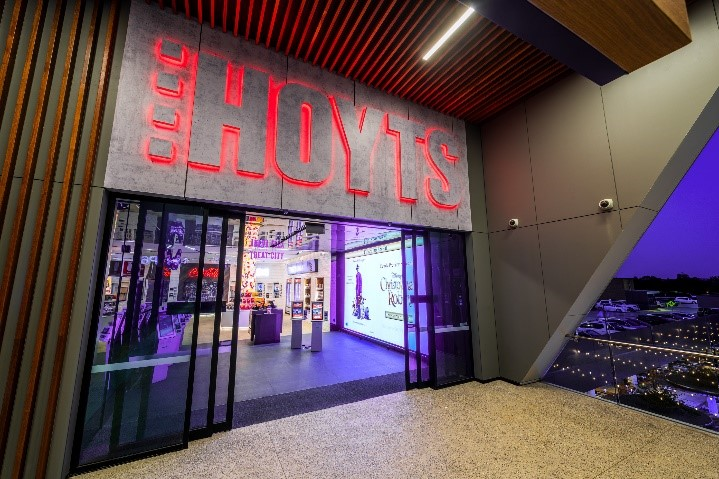
The entrance to Hoyts Stockland Green Hills, opened in 2018

=== 1909–1930 ===
At the start of the 20th century, Melbourne dentist and cornet player Arthur Russell bought a share in a small touring American circus that visited Melbourne, called Hoyts Circus. Russell toured with the circus as a magician, but it did not prove to be a financial success. In 1908, he started presenting moving pictures at St George's Hall in Bourke Street, accompanying the silent films with his small family band: his wife on piano, son on drums, and Russell on cornet. On 18 September 1909 he opened Hoyts Picture Palace, and formed a company called Hoyts Pictures Pty Ltd. The old hall was rebuilt and renamed "Hoyts De Luxe". By the end of World War I, Hoyts had expanded into the suburbs of Melbourne and into Sydney. The shows included vaudeville acts, as was common practice in those days.

In 1926, Hoyts and two other companies, Electric Theatres Pty Ltd and Associated Theatres Pty Ltd., merged to become Hoyts Theatres Limited. In 1930, the 20th Century Fox Film Corporation (now 20th Century Studios) acquired a majority of shares in Hoyts Theaters.

=== 1980s ===
In 1982, 20th Century Fox sold Hoyts to Stardawn Investments, a group of four Melbourne businessmen. In 1985, the Fink family subsequently bought out the other partners to become the sole owner. In 1987, the corporation was restructured and two of the companies in the corporation were listed on the Australian Securities Exchange: Hoyts Media and Hoyts Entertainment. However, the company that owned the cinemas, Hoyts Cinemas, was not floated until 1996. The years between 1987 and 1996 saw Hoyts expand in Australia, New Zealand and the United States. In 1988, Hoyts bought out Interstate Theaters, which made its expansion into the United States market. In the 1980s, Hoyts diversified into radio with the purchase of Triple M Sydney and Eon FM. Further acquisitions included 4BK in Brisbane, 5AD in Adelaide and 96FM in Perth.

=== 1990s ===
Following Leon Fink's death in 1993, Hoyts was sold to Hellman & Friedman and Lendlease. The company eventually went public in 1995. In 1997, Hoyts expanded to Chile with the opening of its first movie theatre there. In 1999, Hoyts celebrated its 90th anniversary and was ranked the seventh largest cinema exhibitor in the world. In the same year, Kerry Packer's private family company, Consolidated Press Holdings, bought the chain for $620 million. After that, Hoyts began to sell off international cinemas except for some New Zealand cinemas. In 1995, the radio assets were sold to Austereo.

=== 2000s ===
In 2003, Hoyts sold all of its US chains to Regal Entertainment Group. In 2004, Hoyts collaborated with Village Roadshow and Amalgamated Holdings Limited to bail out Val Morgan Cinema Advertising, eventually taking its stake to 100% in 2005. In December that year, Publishing & Broadcasting Limited and West Australian Newspapers purchased the company from Consolidated Press. In 2007, Hoyts was sold to Sydney-based private equity firm Pacific Equity Partners. The sale valued the company at A$440 million.

=== 2010s ===
In 2010, Hoyts sold off its Chilean operations to Chilefilms. In the same year, Hoyts acquired Australian Multiplex Cinemas in Queensland and the Berkeley Cinema Group in New Zealand. HOYTS Stream, a video streaming service, was set to launch during 2013, but after being delayed, it was cancelled in 2014. Damian Keogh was appointed chief executive officer, and Hoyts was bought by Chinese billionaire Sun Xishuang through his investment company ID Leisure Ventures in December 2014.

On 21 August 2013, Hoyts closed its Dunedin theatre complex due to a stagnant market, leading to the loss of 35 jobs. Reading Cinemas confirmed plans to acquire and redevelop the site. In late July 2014, Reading Cinemas reopened the former Hoyts complex as its Dunedin branch, having spent NZ$5.5 million on renovating the site.

In June 2015, Wanda Cinema Line, a subsidiary of Dalian Wanda Group, purchased Hoyts from ID Leisure Ventures.

In 2018, Hoyts Kiosk DVD vending machines were rebranded as Video Ezy after the group sold its subsidiary.

In Argentina Hoyts was acquired by Cinemark, in Chile by Cinépolis, and in Uruguay by Life Cinemas.

=== 2020s ===
On 7 September 2022, Cineworld, the current parent company of Hoyts USA, filed for Chapter 11 bankruptcy.

In December 2022, Hoyts acquired three cinemas in WA from Grand Cinemas after the company went into administration. In April 2023, they acquired an additional cinema from Grand. That month, Wanda Film also began seeking buyers for Hoyts. The sale of Beijing Wanda Investment, which had a controlling stake in Wanda Film, to China Ruyi in December 2023 put any potential sale of Hoyts up in the air.

== Cinemas ==
As of 2024, Hoyts owns and operates 60 cinemas across Australia and New Zealand, with 500 screens and more than 560000 seats, making it one of Australia's largest movie exhibitors.

Features available at many Hoyts Cinemas include reclining chairs, large high-resolution screens and immersive surround sound under the Xtremescreen brand, and dine-in menus under the Hoyts Lux brand. Seats that move and vibrate in synchronization with on-screen action have been introduced at some cinemas using D-Box Technologies. Screens that are backed by the brilliant-LED picture are introduced at 2 of Hoyts' cinemas located in Sydney using Samsung Onyx. Hoyts also uses ScreenX which is known for its multi-projection which are available in 3 of its cinemas located in Melbourne and Sydney and even IMAX which is available in 4 of its cinemas. In early of May 2026, Hoyts began installing its own feature called 'Apex' featuring super-sized LED screens, immersive audio, and comfy seats.

Hoyts Cinema Technology Group (CTG) was established in 2008 and helps other exhibitors such as Palace Cinemas install and operate digital cinema. HOYTS CTG also supports one-off screenings such as festivals or corporate events.

== Val Morgan ==
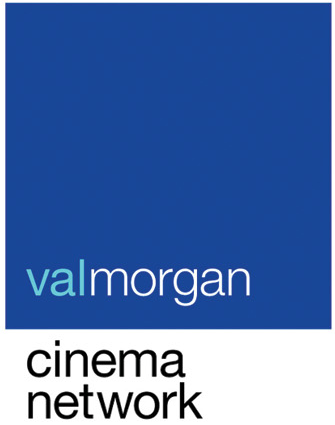
Val Morgan's logo (2010s)

Val Morgan was created by Valentine (Val) Morgan and specializes in advertising on cinema screens. Val Morgan's sister company, Val Morgan Outdoor (VMO), operates advertising screens in shopping centres, gyms, service stations and office towers, as well as outdoor digital billboards.

== Hoyts Distribution ==
Hoyts Distribution was the film distribution arm of the group which existed in its own right from 1979 to 1994; it possessed the distribution rights to Cannon Films, Carolco and Nelson Entertainment films in Australia and New Zealand. The distribution unit was originally founded by Jim Shakespeare, the national sales manager of the company and Bill Gavin, general manager of films and marketing of the company. The company's first films include The Chant of Jimmie Blacksmith, The Stud, The Boys from Brazil, Dawn! and Long Weekend.

It was later merged with the distribution operations of Columbia TriStar Film Distributors and 20th Century Fox, forming Hoyts -Fox-Columbia TriStar Films (later Fox-Columbia TriStar Films after Hoyts dropped out of the venture). In 1993, the entertainment branch of Hoyts was spin-off to Television and Media Services, with the unit being renamed to TMS Distribution. The company's original film library was sold off to Becker Entertainment in 1999. In 2001, the company was revived under the leadership of Kerry Packer, distributing primarily films produced by Nine Films and Television and major independent studios such as Lions Gate Entertainment.

Hoyts also operated a home video arm in concert with Sony, beginning in 1983 as RCA/Columbia/Hoyts Video In addition to Columbia Pictures and TriStar fare through the main label, the company also held rights to Cannon and other releases via Hoyts, and starting in 1990, Orion Pictures releases via that company's worldwide distribution deal with Columbia. RCA/Columbia/Hoyts (later renamed to Columbia TriStar/Hoyts Home Video) also released product through two alternative labels, First Release Home Entertainment and Video Box Office. HOYTS also had, beginning in 1988 a joint venture with PolyGram, Hoyts PolyGram Video; this label concentrated primarily on sell-through material, including PolyGram's music video library. In 2004, the revived Hoyts Distribution partnered with MGM Home Entertainment and Universal Studios Home Entertainment to launch its own home video arm.

In 2012, Hoyts Distribution was sold to French production and distribution company StudioCanal and was rebranded under that banner the following year.
