= E&s (retailer) =

Australian retail company

e&s
- Type: Subsidiary
- Industry: Retail
- Founded: 1962; 64 years ago
- Founder: Bob Sinclair
- Headquarters: Melbourne, Victoria, Australia
- Number of locations: 13 stores (2026)
- Key people: Rob Sinclair (Managing Director)
- Products: Home appliances, bathroom fixtures, plumbing
- Parent: JB Hi-Fi (75%)
- Website: eands.com.au

E. & S. Trading Co. (Discounts) Pty. Ltd., trading as e&s, is an Australian specialist retailer of kitchen, bathroom, and laundry appliances and fixtures. Founded in 1962, the company operates showrooms across Victoria and the Australian Capital Territory. Since September 2024, it has operated as a majority-owned subsidiary of the JB Hi-Fi Group. As of 2026, there are 13 stores.

== History ==
e&s was established in 1962 as E. & S. Trading Co. by Bob Sinclair and his two brothers. Bob and his wife Kaye Sinclair subsequently assumed full control of the business, focusing the company's operations on discounted household appliances within the Melbourne market.

E&S Trading was an original founding member of the National Associated Retail Traders of Australia (Narta) buying group, a procurement network established to assist independent retailers in negotiating purchasing terms with international manufacturers.

Following Bob Sinclair's death in 2006, his son Rob Sinclair succeeded him as Managing Director. Throughout the 2010s and 2020s, e&s positioned itself as a major competitor in the premium architectural and commercial build sector, contrasting with mass-market appliance retailers. Industry publications noted the company's influence on Australian showroom design, particularly its focus on functioning, interactive kitchen displays and exclusive distribution rights for European brands in Victoria.

By 2024, prior to its acquisition, the company had grown its revenue to approximately A$230 million annually, operating heavily in the commercial developer market alongside its retail footprint. The company expanded its physical presence beyond its traditional Victorian base by opening a commercial and retail showroom in Fyshwick, ACT, in August 2024.

== JB Hi-Fi acquisition ==
On 12 August 2024, JB Hi-Fi Limited announced to the Australian Securities Exchange that it had entered into a binding agreement to acquire a 75% stake in e&s for A$47.8 million, funded entirely from cash reserves. The acquisition was structured on a cash-free, debt-free basis and was intended to expand JB Hi-Fi's presence in the premium home appliance and commercial construction markets.

The transaction was formally completed on 2 September 2024. As part of the acquisition agreement, Rob Sinclair retained a 25% ownership stake and continued in his role as Managing Director. A put and call option was also established, providing a mechanism for JB Hi-Fi to acquire the remaining 25% of the company in September 2029.
