= Australian Multiplex Cinemas =

Australian cinema chain

Australian Multiplex Cinemas Pty Ltd
- Type: Privately held company
- Industry: Film exhibition, Cinema advertising
- Founded: 1993
- Headquarters: Brisbane, Australia
- Area served: Australia
- Subsidiaries: AMC Cinema Advertising Pty Ltd
- Website: www.a-m-c.com.au

Australian Multiplex Cinemas (often abbreviated as AMC) was a chain of multiple-screen movie cinemas headquartered in Brisbane, the state capital of Queensland, Australia acquired by Hoyts in November 2010.

== Acquisition by Hoyts ==
In October 2010, Hoyts announced that it will acquire AMC for an unknown amount. The purchase was completed in November 2010. Hoyts has stated on their website that AMC customers will now have access to a wider variety of films, promotions, competitions and cinema offers. Hoyts have also promised to increase 3D facilities for the cinema chain. The AMC Value Card program was discontinued, with Hoyts promising to recognize these cards until their expiry date. The new rewards program being offered is now Hoyts Rewards.

== Locations ==
Australian Multiplex Cinemas operate in five locations in three states:

=== Queensland ===
- Redcliffe – eight screens at Peninsula Fair Shopping Centre
- Stafford – ten screens at Stafford City Shopping Centre
- Sunnybank – eight screens at Sunnybank Plaza Shopping Centre

=== New South Wales ===
- Tweed Heads South – six screens at Tweed City Shopping Centre
