= The Good Guys (Australian company) =

Australian consumer electronics chain owned by JB Hi-Fi

The Good Guys Discount Warehouses (Australia) Pty. Ltd.
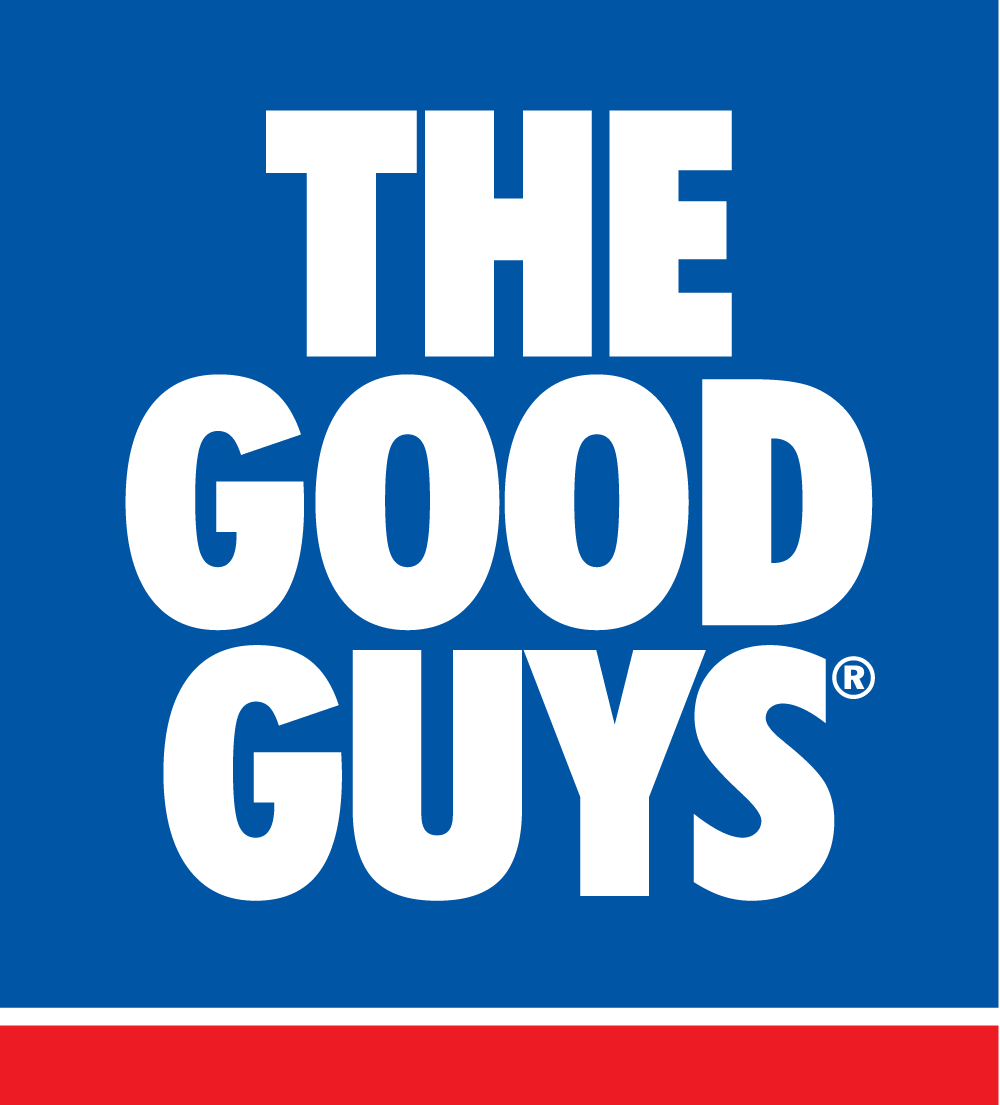
- Type: Subsidiary
- Industry: Electrical retail
- Founded: Essendon, Victoria, Australia 1952; 74 years ago
- Headquarters: Southbank, Victoria, Australia
- Number of locations: 107 stores (2026)
- Area served: Australia
- Key people: Biaggio Capasso (managing director); Simon Leigh (merchandise services director); Robert Ambler-Fraser (marketing director); Tania Garonzi (merchandise director); Tony Berrington (retail operations director)
- Products: White goods; Kitchen appliances; Kitchenware; Consumer electronics
- Revenue: A$2.81 billion (2023)
- Parent: JB Hi-Fi
- Website: thegoodguys.com.au

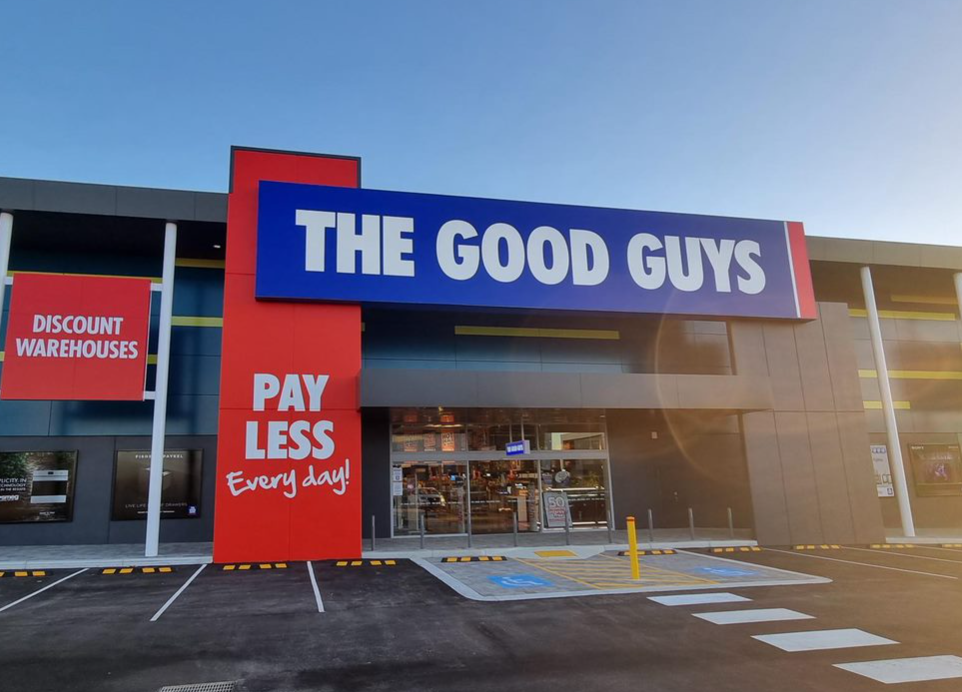
The Good Guys store in Butler, Western Australia

The Good Guys Discount Warehouses (Australia) Pty Ltd., trading as The Good Guys, is a chain of consumer electronics and white goods retail stores in Australia and formerly New Zealand. Its national headquarters is in the Melbourne suburb of Southbank, Victoria. The company was founded by Ian Muir, and following his death in 2009 ownership of the chain remained with the Muir family. In 2016, The Good Guys was purchased by JB Hi-Fi. As of 2026, there are 107 stores.

== History ==
Ian Muir began retailing electrical goods in the Melbourne suburb of Essendon in 1952. Initial growth was slow, with 14 stores across Victoria and Queensland trading under the brand name Mighty Muirs by 1992, when Ian and son Andrew renamed the chain of stores "The Good Guys". A strong advertising campaign in 1997 resulted in increased sales, driving rapid expansion of stores across the country. By 2009, the chain had grown to 89 stores across Australia. In 2016 there were 101 stores.

In January 2010, the retailer announced plans to expand into the New Zealand market, opening its first store in May at Wairau Valley in North Shore. A second store at Botany Downs opened in July, followed by a third in Manukau. By June 2014, there were five stores across the Auckland Metropolitan Area when the company announced it would pull out of the New Zealand Market citing poor returns. Following the announcement, The Warehouse Group agreed to take over the leases of the Good Guys stores and re-employ most of their local staff.

In 2010, competitor JB Hi-Fi was reported as interested in purchasing the chain for a reported sum of $750 million; however, the parties could not reach agreement and the deal was not finalised. It was also reported that both Wesfarmers and the US based Blackstone Group had expressed interest in purchasing the chain. Analysts valued the business at close to $600 million, however it was believed the Muir family would not sell for less than $1 billion. The organisation of the company, with stores being held in joint ownership, added complexity to negotiations with potential buyers. In September 2016 JB Hi-Fi bought The Good Guys for $870 million, despite competition concerns.

== Business model ==
Until 2016, Good Guys stores mainly operated as joint venture partnerships between individual store proprietors and the Muir family, although at the time of corporatisation about 40% of the group was corporately owned. The joint venture model had proven successful and operated such that store proprietors owned half the store operation and operated it as their own business. The Good Guys stores are generally large warehouse type stores and rely on volume in sales.

The company also offers a 30-day price guarantee, whereby customers who find a lower advertised price at a competing store after purchasing may be eligible to receive a 120% refund on the price difference between the two products. In 2015 The Good Guys introduced "Concierge" programs across its Australian stores. This was a direct replacement of the old "extended warranties" system that the stores had in place.

The company has moved away from its "Pay Less, Pay Cash" slogan, opting for the simple catchphrase "Pay Less Every day". The jingle was based on the lyrics from the song "Good Vibrations" by The Beach Boys.

== Community involvement ==
In 2010, The Good Guys established The Good Foundation and in partnership with celebrity chef Jamie Oliver and the Queensland state government funded the establishment of the first Australian Ministry of Food centre in Ipswich, west of Brisbane. The Foundation aims to encourage and support programs and initiatives that have the potential to improve the health and social welfare of communities across Australia, with particular regard to tackling obesity, poor nutrition and diet by raising awareness of the impact of these issues on the health care system.

All Good Guys stores contribute a percentage of every online and instore transaction to various community organisations in the local area surrounding the store. Each store generally supports more than one organisation and features a token box, where customers are encouraged to vote for their preferred charity by placing a token given with their receipt in a corresponding slot.

Since joining with JB Hi Fi Group in 2016, The Good Guys have been supporting 12 charities through their Doing Good Workplace Giving program. Every dollar donated by team members is matched by The Good Guys, to double the positive impact on the charities and the community.
