= Schnitz =

Australian food franchise

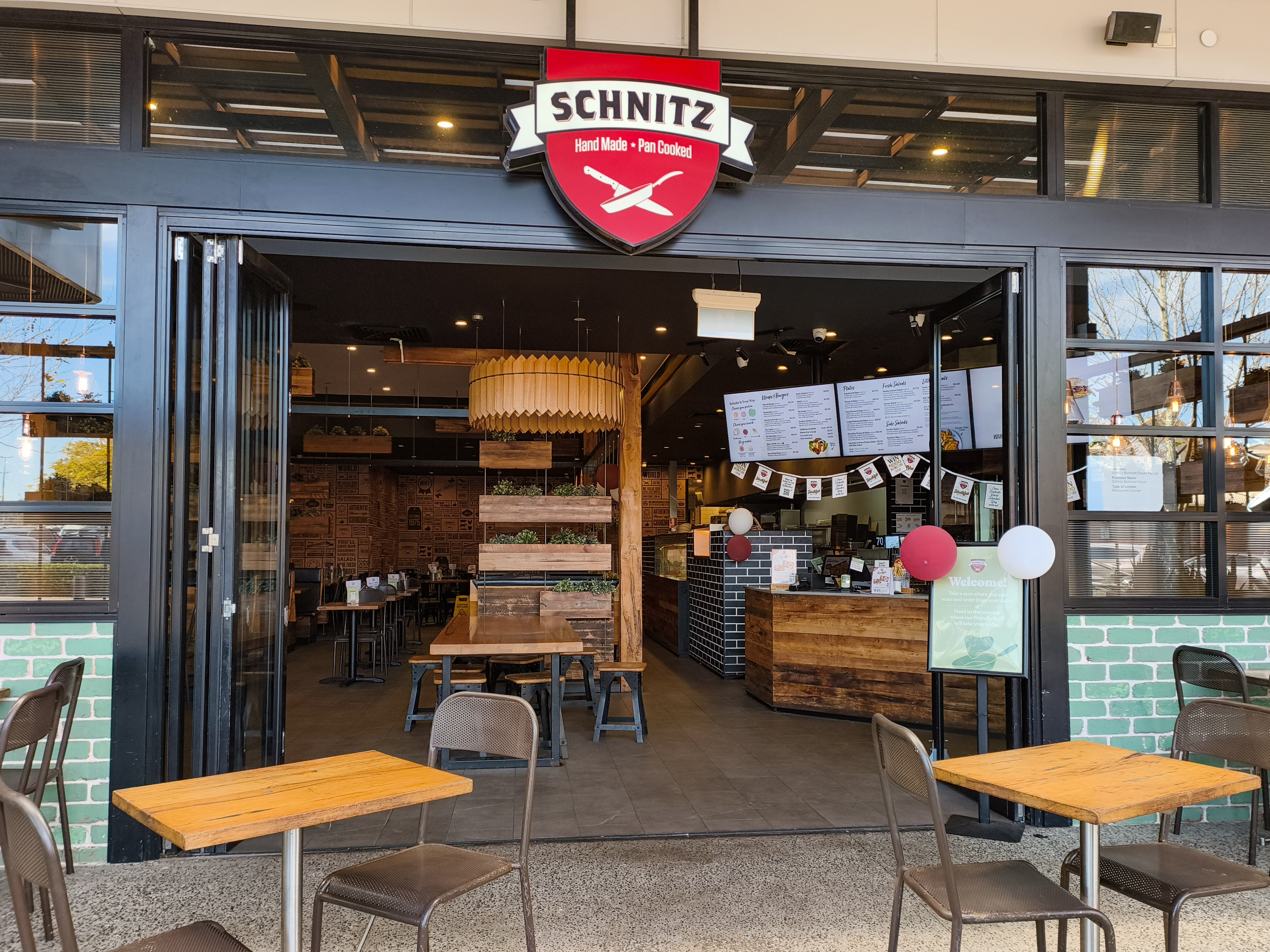
- Schnitz restaurant at Belmont Forum

Restaurant information
- Established: 2007; 19 years ago
- Owners: Roman Dyduk, Tom Dyduk, Andrew Dyduk
- Food type: Schnitzel
- Location: Australia
- Website: schnitz.com.au

Schnitz is a Melbourne-based Australian fast-casual franchise that specialises in schnitzel dishes. Schnitz has schnitzels in a variety of formats, most notably their "wrap" and "roll" options.

The first Schnitz store was opened in 2007 by Roman Dyduk. He and his sons, Tom and Andrew, own and operate the company. 2016 was the most successful year for Schnitz opening stores all around Australia. In 2016 Schnitz was ranked the 32nd Fastest Growing Franchise by BRW Fast Franchises after achieving 75% growth.

== History ==
Schnitz is an Australian fast-casual restaurant chain specialising in schnitzel-based dishes. The brand traces its origins to founder Roman Dyduk, who learned to cook traditional schnitzels as a child in his family’s Polish kitchen, where the dish was a staple of home-cooked meals.

After migrating to Australia, Dyduk opened several restaurants that featured his signature pan-cooked schnitzel. In 2007, the family launched a small café in Melbourne dedicated primarily to schnitzel dishes, marking the beginning of the Schnitz brand.

The concept later expanded into a franchise network across Australia. Schnitz restaurants continue to focus on schnitzel prepared using traditional techniques, including crumbing and pan-cooking, which reflect the methods originally used in Dyduk’s family kitchen.

== Distribution ==
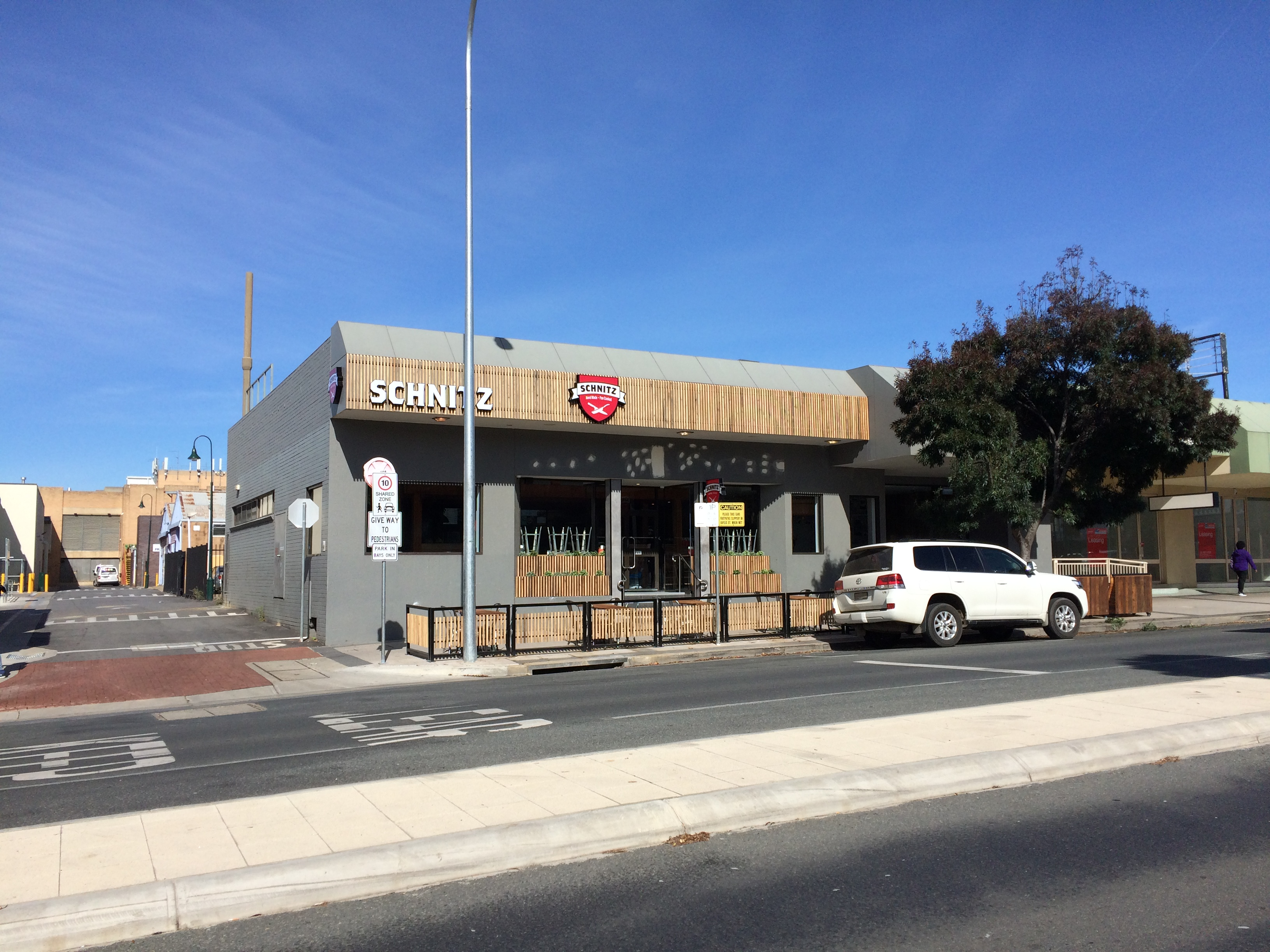
A Schnitz restaurant in Wagga Wagga

In late 2026, Schnitz's had 84 stores: 62 in Victoria, 9 in New South Wales, 9 in Queensland, 1 in South Australia and 3 in Western Australia.
