= JB Hi-Fi =

Australian consumer electronics retail company

- Type: Public
- Traded as: ASX: JBH; S&P/ASX 200 component
- Industry: Retail
- Founded: Keilor East, Victoria, Australia (1974; 52 years ago)
- Founder: John Barbuto
- Headquarters: Southbank, Victoria, Australia
- Number of locations: 330 (2024)
- Area served: Australia; New Zealand
- Key people: Stephen Goddard (Chairman); Terry Smart (CEO)
- Products: Consumer electronics
- Revenue: A$9.59 billion (2024)
- Operating income: A$627.4 million (2024)
- Net income: A$438.8 million (2024)
- Total assets: A$3.486 billion (2024)
- Total equity: $1.559 billion (2024)
- Number of employees: 15,000 (2024)
- Subsidiaries: The Good Guys; e&s
- Website: jbhifi.com.au

JB Hi-Fi Limited is an Australian consumer electronics retail company. It is publicly listed on the Australian Securities Exchange. Its headquarters are located in Southbank, Melbourne, Victoria.

As of June 2024, the company operates 330 stores across Australia and New Zealand including 205 JB Hi-Fi and JB Hi-Fi Home stores in Australia, and 19 JB Hi-Fi stores in New Zealand, in addition to 106 The Good Guys stores in Australia.

== History ==
=== 1974–2009 ===
JB Hi-Fi was established in the Melbourne suburb of Keilor East by John Barbuto in 1974, selling music and specialist hi-fi equipment. Barbuto sold the business in 1983 to Richard Bouris, David Rodd and Peter Caserta, who expanded JB Hi-Fi into a chain of ten stores in Melbourne and Sydney turning over $150 million by 2000, when they sold the majority of their holding to private equity. It was subsequently floated on the ASX in October 2003.

In July 2004, JB Hi-Fi bought 70% of the Clive Anthonys chain in Queensland. On 13 December 2006, JB Hi-Fi acquired the Hill and Stewart chain of 11 electronics stores selling and operating in New Zealand for NZ$17.5 million (A$15.3 million). JB Hi-Fi then established stores under their own JB Hi-Fi brand in New Zealand in 2007, and closed all Hill and Stewart stores in 2010.

=== 2010s ===
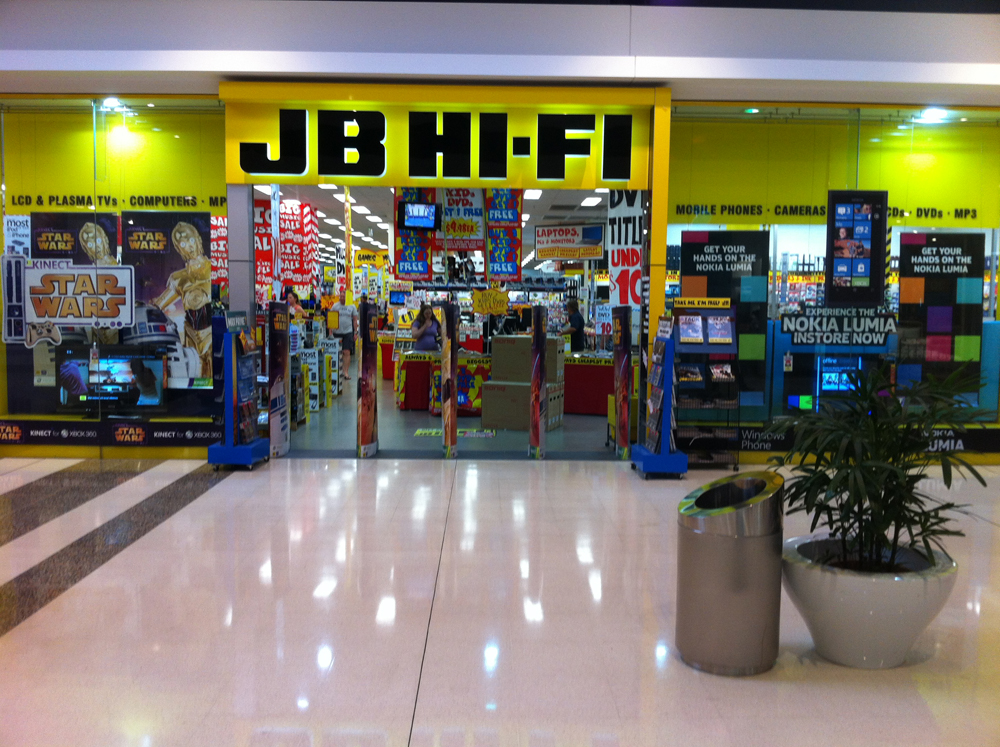
A JB Hi-Fi store at Stockland Rockhampton Shopping Centre, in Rockhampton, Queensland, in 2012

In 2010, there were 10 JB Hi-Fi stores in New Zealand. In 2011, this increased to 13.

On 22 September 2015, a man with Down syndrome was refused entry into a JB Hi-Fi store in Brisbane, Australia, after being confused for another person with the same disability who had been banned from the store. The resulting media attention led CEO Richard Murray to apologise publicly to the family.

On 13 September 2016, JB Hi-Fi announced its acquisition of The Good Guys, for $870 million, the acquisition resulted in JB Hi-Fi group enlarging its share of the Australian home appliances retail market to 29% and growing its share of the consumer electronics retail market to 24%.

In August 2018, JB Hi-Fi was ranked as the equal 7th largest consumer electronics and home appliance retailer in the world.

=== 2020s ===
By 2020 most of JB Hi-Fi's sales had shifted away from software (music CDs, DVDs and video games) to hardware (such as televisions, mobile phones and computers). That year software sales made up only 8% of total sales for the retailer, down from 27% in 2010.

On 28 April 2021, it was announced that Richard Murray, JB Hi-Fi's CEO of seven years, would be leaving his role at the end of August to work alongside trader Solomon Lew at the latter's company Premier Investments. Terry Smart, the head of The Good Guys, was announced as Murray's replacement on the same day.

In December 2023, a class action lawsuit was lodged against the company in which the retailer was accused of offering extended warranties which are alleged to be worthless or of little value, as they "essentially offer Australian consumers the same thing as what they already get for free under the Australian Consumer Law".

In September 2024, JB Hi-Fi acquired a 75% stake in kitchen and bathroom business E&S Trading for $47.8 million. In February 2025, the company launched its retail media network in partnership with Retail MediaWorks.

== Corporate affairs ==
=== Financial performance ===
For financial year 2022 (1 July 2021 - 30 June 2022) JB Hi-Fi Limited reported sales of AUD$9.23 billion, earnings before interest and taxes (EBIT) of AUD$794.6 million and net profit after tax (NPAT) of AUD$544.9 million.

JB Hi-Fi Financial Performance 2001-2021
JB Hi-Fi Limited	AUD Millions			AUD Millions
Financial Year	Sales	EBIT	NPAT	JB Hi-Fi Financial Performance 2001-2022
2001	$154.9	$5.7	$2.6	JB Hi-Fi Sales 2001-2022 View source data. Sales JB Hi-Fi Profitability 2001-2022 View source data. Earnings before interest and taxes (EBIT) Net profit after tax (NPAT) JB Hi-Fi Profitability 2001-2022
2002	$248.8	$11.6	$6.2	JB Hi-Fi Sales 2001-2022 View source data. Sales JB Hi-Fi Profitability 2001-2022 View source data. Earnings before interest and taxes (EBIT) Net profit after tax (NPAT) JB Hi-Fi Profitability 2001-2022
2003	$355.8	$16.7	$8.6	JB Hi-Fi Sales 2001-2022 View source data. Sales JB Hi-Fi Profitability 2001-2022 View source data. Earnings before interest and taxes (EBIT) Net profit after tax (NPAT) JB Hi-Fi Profitability 2001-2022
2004	$452.4	$22.8	$13.8	JB Hi-Fi Sales 2001-2022 View source data. Sales JB Hi-Fi Profitability 2001-2022 View source data. Earnings before interest and taxes (EBIT) Net profit after tax (NPAT) JB Hi-Fi Profitability 2001-2022
2005	$639.9	$34.7	$19.5	JB Hi-Fi Sales 2001-2022 View source data. Sales JB Hi-Fi Profitability 2001-2022 View source data. Earnings before interest and taxes (EBIT) Net profit after tax (NPAT) JB Hi-Fi Profitability 2001-2022
2006	$945.8	$44.5	$25.8	JB Hi-Fi Sales 2001-2022 View source data. Sales JB Hi-Fi Profitability 2001-2022 View source data. Earnings before interest and taxes (EBIT) Net profit after tax (NPAT) JB Hi-Fi Profitability 2001-2022
2007	$1,281.8	$65.5	$40.4	JB Hi-Fi Sales 2001-2022 View source data. Sales JB Hi-Fi Profitability 2001-2022 View source data. Earnings before interest and taxes (EBIT) Net profit after tax (NPAT) JB Hi-Fi Profitability 2001-2022
2008	$1,828.6	$102.3	$65.1	JB Hi-Fi Sales 2001-2022 View source data. Sales JB Hi-Fi Profitability 2001-2022 View source data. Earnings before interest and taxes (EBIT) Net profit after tax (NPAT) JB Hi-Fi Profitability 2001-2022
2009	$2,327.3	$142.0	$94.4	JB Hi-Fi Sales 2001-2022 View source data. Sales JB Hi-Fi Profitability 2001-2022 View source data. Earnings before interest and taxes (EBIT) Net profit after tax (NPAT) JB Hi-Fi Profitability 2001-2022
2010	$2,731.3	$175.1	$118.7	JB Hi-Fi Sales 2001-2022 View source data. Sales JB Hi-Fi Profitability 2001-2022 View source data. Earnings before interest and taxes (EBIT) Net profit after tax (NPAT) JB Hi-Fi Profitability 2001-2022
2011	$2,959.3	$196.0	$134.4	JB Hi-Fi Sales 2001-2022 View source data. Sales JB Hi-Fi Profitability 2001-2022 View source data. Earnings before interest and taxes (EBIT) Net profit after tax (NPAT) JB Hi-Fi Profitability 2001-2022
2012	$3,127.8	$161.5	$104.6	JB Hi-Fi Sales 2001-2022 View source data. Sales JB Hi-Fi Profitability 2001-2022 View source data. Earnings before interest and taxes (EBIT) Net profit after tax (NPAT) JB Hi-Fi Profitability 2001-2022
2013	$3,308.4	$177.8	$116.4	JB Hi-Fi Sales 2001-2022 View source data. Sales JB Hi-Fi Profitability 2001-2022 View source data. Earnings before interest and taxes (EBIT) Net profit after tax (NPAT) JB Hi-Fi Profitability 2001-2022
2014	$3,483.8	$191.1	$128.4	JB Hi-Fi Sales 2001-2022 View source data. Sales JB Hi-Fi Profitability 2001-2022 View source data. Earnings before interest and taxes (EBIT) Net profit after tax (NPAT) JB Hi-Fi Profitability 2001-2022
2015	$3,625.1	$200.9	$136.5	JB Hi-Fi Sales 2001-2022 View source data. Sales JB Hi-Fi Profitability 2001-2022 View source data. Earnings before interest and taxes (EBIT) Net profit after tax (NPAT) JB Hi-Fi Profitability 2001-2022
2016	$3,954.5	$221.2	$152.2	JB Hi-Fi Sales 2001-2022 View source data. Sales JB Hi-Fi Profitability 2001-2022 View source data. Earnings before interest and taxes (EBIT) Net profit after tax (NPAT) JB Hi-Fi Profitability 2001-2022
2017	$5,628.0	$290.5	$172.1	JB Hi-Fi Sales 2001-2022 View source data. Sales JB Hi-Fi Profitability 2001-2022 View source data. Earnings before interest and taxes (EBIT) Net profit after tax (NPAT) JB Hi-Fi Profitability 2001-2022
2018	$6,854.3	$350.6	$233.2	JB Hi-Fi Sales 2001-2022 View source data. Sales JB Hi-Fi Profitability 2001-2022 View source data. Earnings before interest and taxes (EBIT) Net profit after tax (NPAT) JB Hi-Fi Profitability 2001-2022
2019	$7,095.3	$372.9	$249.8	JB Hi-Fi Sales 2001-2022 View source data. Sales JB Hi-Fi Profitability 2001-2022 View source data. Earnings before interest and taxes (EBIT) Net profit after tax (NPAT) JB Hi-Fi Profitability 2001-2022
2020	$7,918.9	$483.3	$302.3	JB Hi-Fi Sales 2001-2022 View source data. Sales JB Hi-Fi Profitability 2001-2022 View source data. Earnings before interest and taxes (EBIT) Net profit after tax (NPAT) JB Hi-Fi Profitability 2001-2022
2021	$8,916.1	$743.1	$506.1	JB Hi-Fi Sales 2001-2022 View source data. Sales JB Hi-Fi Profitability 2001-2022 View source data. Earnings before interest and taxes (EBIT) Net profit after tax (NPAT) JB Hi-Fi Profitability 2001-2022
2022	$9,232.0	$794.6	$544.9	JB Hi-Fi Sales 2001-2022 View source data. Sales JB Hi-Fi Profitability 2001-2022 View source data. Earnings before interest and taxes (EBIT) Net profit after tax (NPAT) JB Hi-Fi Profitability 2001-2022

=== Store count ===
As of 30 June 2022 the company operates 199 JB Hi-Fi stores in Australia and 14 JB Hi-Fi stores in New Zealand, in addition to 106 The Good Guys stores in Australia.

JB Hi-Fi Limited Store Count 2001–2022
JB Hi-Fi Limited Store Count 2001–2022
JB Hi-Fi Store Count 2001–2022 View source data. Total Stores JB Hi-Fi Australia Stores JB Hi-Fi New Zealand Stores The Good Guys Stores Clive Anthony Stores Hill & Stewart Stores JB Hi-Fi Store Count 2001–2022
Financial Year	2001	2002	2003	2004	2005	2006	2007	2008	2009	2010	2011	2012	2013	2014	2015	2016	2017	2018	2019	2020	2021	2022
JB Hi-Fi Australia	15	21	26	27	42	60	71	85	98	120	139	153	163	169	173	179	185	193	196	195	197	199
JB Hi-Fi New Zealand	-	-	-		-	-	1	5	8	10	13	13	13	13	14	15	16	15	14	14	14	14
The Good Guys	-	-	-	-	-	-	-	-	-	-	-	-	-	-	-	-	102	103	105	105	105	106
Clive Anthonys	-	-	-	5	6	6	6	8	11	11	5	2	1	-	-	-	-	-	-	-	-	-
Hill & Stewart	-	-	-	-	-	-	11	7	6	-	-	-	-	-	-	-	-	-	-	-	-	-
Total Store Count	15	21	26	32	48	66	89	105	123	141	157	168	177	182	187	194	303	311	315	314	316	319

== Branding ==
JB Hi-Fi is known for its distinctive hand-drawn instore signage and product reviews written by its employees, some examples of which have gone viral on the internet. Commentators have noted that the bespoke signage gives customers the impression that the business can keep their prices low compared to competing retailers by not spending money on professional printing.

The image of the retailer has been described as "deliberately laid-back", and the fit out of their stores as "bare bones".
