= Consolidated Theatres =

Consolidated Theatres may refer to

- Consolidated Theatres (Hawaii)
- Consolidated Theatres (North Carolina)
