= List of theatres in Hobart =

This is a list of theatres in Hobart in Tasmania, Australia. The Hobart City Centre has several theatres in continuous operation, including live theatre venues, picture theatres, a single multiplex operated by Village Cinemas, as well as several former theatres that are currently inoperable or demolished.

Name	Address	Opened	Seats	Use	Notes	Image
7D Cinema Hobart	8 Montpelier Retreat, Battery Point	2015	9	films	Virtual reality cinema named for the seven dimensions of sensory experience: the three dimensions of sight, touch, audio, tactility and movement. It screened 10 short five-minute films designed to make use of the 7D Cinema setup. It closed in 2020.	
Avalon Theatre	52 - 54 Melville Street, Hobart	1890	927	films, theatre	Originally built as a Temperance Hall in 1890, it was used for religious gatherings, tea drinking, live entertainment and family-focused activities. Notably, the Temperance Hall was used for meetings surrounding Women's suffrage in Australia and visited by Jessie Ackermann, who spoke at the hall in 1892. Known as the **Bijou Theatre** throughout the 1920s the venue showcased pantomimes, boxing, travelling theatre productions and live music productions. It became Hobart's first talkie theatre when it reopened as the **Avalon Theatre** on 11 March 1932. In 1966, the Avalon became home to Hobart's only 70mm film projector. The venue closed in 1976 and operated as an electronics store until 2009. It was purchased by the Hillsong Church in 2020.	
Cinema One	86 Murray Street, Hobart	1955	256	films	Located in the basement of an office tower. Opened as the **Tatler Theatrette** on 28 July 1955 and renamed **Cinema One** in 1972. Was home of the Hobart Film Society throughout the 70s and 80s. In 2018, it screened Terror Nullius by the remix filmmaking collective Soda_Jerk as part of Dark Mofo festivities.	
His Majesty's Theatre	168 Liverpool Street, Hobart	1911	1,393	films, theatre	**His Majesty's Theatre** was opened on 23 January 1911 with the comic opera The Runaway Girl. Seating was provided in orchestra stalls and dress circle levels and the proscenium was 24 ft wide. There were eight dressing rooms. It also presented vaudeville, and by 1912 it went into cinema use as part of Spencer's Pictures chain. They were taken over by Union Theatres in 1919. It closed in 1961. By 1970 it was converted into a clothing store. The exterior has been covered in metal cladding, but interior decorations remain.	
Hoyts Mid City	117 Collins Street, Hobart	1982	400	films, theatre	Single-screen cinema redeveloped by architect Ron Monborough in the basement of the T&G Building, Hobart. Opened in October 1982 with The Man from Snowy River. **Hoyts Mid City** was originally decorated in bold blue and red colours with extensive use of mirrors and chrome, and able to seat over 400 patrons. It was closed in the 1990s and converted into a basement carpark.	
Lyric Theatre	Glenorchy, Tasmania	1924	450	films	Short lived single-screen cinema opened in December, 1924 by renown local contractor and builder Mr V. Barker, who operated the venue with his two sons and two daughters.	
Moonah Theatre	113-115 Main Road, Moonah	1924	1,050	films	Upon opening in 1924, the **Moonah Picture Theatre** proudly announced it was "all Australia made", including the projection equipment. It was officially opened by future-Prime Minister Joseph Lyons (then-Premier of Tasmania). It closed in 1962 and was developed into the Moonah Centre.	
Odeon Theatre	167 Liverpool Street, Hobart	1916	1,690	live music	Once described as "the finest building in Tasmania", the Odeon has undergone a series of alterations leaving it near unrecognisable from its original design. Built as **The Strand**, it was Tasmania's largest single screen cinema, then served as the home of the Tasmanian Symphony Orchestra for nearly three decades. It has been rejuvenated in recent years and currently operates as a live entertainment venue.	
Palace Theatre	28-32 Elizabeth Street, Hobart	1914	600	films	The **Palace Theatre** was an Art Nouveau cinema opposite the Hobart GPO designed by architect George Stanley Crisp. It opened on 2 June 1914 accompanied by an orchestra conducted by Eva Creese. The theatre suffered several bio box fires and eventually closed ten year later when the owners were unable to expand the premises. All outwards signs of its former exterior were removed in 1934. The building became a restaurant and grocery store and was demolished in the early '70s. It is now the site of the Mövenpick Hotel.	
Peacock Theatre	77 Salamanca Place	1970s	133	films, live music, comedy	Carved into the foot of a historic quarry at Salamanca Place.	
Playhouse Theatre	106 Bathurst Street, Hobart	1864	230	theatre, comedy	Originally built as a chapel in 1864. Operated by the Hobart Repertory Theatre Society since 1936, it was called the **Amuzu Cinema** before being renamed the **Playhouse Theatre** in 1938. The live performance space hosts a mixture of classic dramas, comedies and musicals. There are two tiers of seating with wheelchair access to the stalls.	
Prince of Wales Theatre	85 Macquarie Street, Hobart	1911	1010	films, theatre	Designed by architect Douglas Salier, it opened as the **Grand Empire Theatre** on 2 January 1911. Then-owner Edwin Herbert Webster had the auditorium rebuilt by architect firm Walker & Johnston and renamed the building the **Prince of Wales Theatre** in 1925. Throughout the 1940s and 1950s it was operated by Louise Lovely and her husband Bertie Cowan. In 1983, it had a seating capacity of 843. The theatre fell into decline and was demolished in 1987 for a carpark and office tower.	
Regent Theatre	31 Cambridge Road, Bellerive	1931	300	films, community activities	Opened 5 November 1931 as the **Regent Talkies**. The building doubled as the Bellerive town hall and hosted community activities and events. The theatre closed in the 1960s. Reopening as the Civic Cinema in 1975, the opening film was Petersen with actor Wendy Hughes in attendance. The Civic was closed in 1977 and subsequently demolished.	
Rewind Cinema	12 St Johns Avenue, New Town	2022	150	films	Boutique single-screen revival movie theatre screening blockbusters, cult classics and childhood favourites from the 80s and 90s.	
State Cinema	375 Elizabeth Street, North Hobart	1913	700	films	Tasmania's largest arthouse cinema. The grand re-opening of the **State Cinema** was attended by Labor Prime Minister Gough Whitlam after it was purchased by the government-funded Australian Film Institute in 1976. It was purchased by North Hobart businessman John Kelly in 2002, who revitalised the theatre, expanding the building to include 11 screens, a rooftop cinema, cafe, bar and bookstore. The State Cinema was acquired by the US-owned Reading Cinemas chain in November 2019.	
Theatre Royal	27-29 Campbell Street, Hobart	1837	698	theatre, comedy	The **Theatre Royal** opened in 1837, with major additions in 1850 and 1890. It has walls constructed of convict-carved stone, and remains Australia's oldest continually operating theatre. It presents live theatre, contemporary music, dance and entertainment. It was bridged with **The Hedberg** in 2021, a world-class performing arts campus building operated by the University of Tasmania.	
Village Cinemas Eastlands	Bligh Street, Rosny Park	2003	213	films	Includes 4 screens for 139 – 213 patrons and a sectioned off function area.	
Village Cinemas Glenorchy	Eady Street & Cooper Street, Glenorchy	2000	727	films	Includes 4 screens for 126 – 291 patrons and a sectioned off function area.	
Village Cinemas Hobart	181 Collins Street, Hobart	1976	432	films	Opened in 1976 as the **West End Twin**. In 1983, Cinema 1 is cited as having 609 seating capacity and Cinema 2 seating 401. In 1988 it was expanded to 7 screens and renamed **Village Cinemas**. Includes 4 traditional screens and 3 Gold Class screens for 186 – 432 patrons, Intencity arcade and a sectioned off function area. In 2017, developer Emmanuel Kalis sold the venue for $33 million to a private investor from Sydney.	

== See also ==
- List of drive-in theatres in Australia
- List of theatres in Melbourne
