= A Waltz Through the Hills =

- Based on: A Waltz Through the Hills by Gerald Glaskin
- Written by: John Goldsmith
- Directed by: Frank Arnold
- Starring: Dan O'Herlihy; Ernie Dingo; Michael Carman; Mawuyul Yanthalawuy; Geoff Gibbs; Ken Colbung
- Theme music composer: Garry McDonald; Laurie Stone
- Countries of origin: Australia; United States
- Original language: English

Production
- Producers: Paul D. Barron; Roz Berrystone
- Running time: 119 minutes
- Budget: $1.8 million

Original release
- Network: Barron Entertainment; CPB; PBS
- Release: 1988

A Waltz Through The Hills is a 1988 Australian-American made-for-television adventure drama film based on the novel of the same name by Gerald Glaskin. It is the story of two orphaned children who run away from their home in the Western Australia outback to go to Perth so they can sail to England to live with their grandparents. It was produced for the PBS series WonderWorks in the United States

== Plot ==
In Wyanilling, Western Australia in 1954, 11-year-old Andy Dean and his 5-year-old sister, Sammy, live at a hotel run by Burt and Molly Thompson. The children are good friends with Tom, the caretaker at the hotel. One day word comes that their mother, who had gone to hospital for an operation, has died, leaving Andy and Sammy orphans. Molly Thompson wants to adopt them, but her husband does not. Andy overhears a conversation in which he learns if he and Sammy are sent to an orphanage, they'll be split up. Andy decides they should run away to Perth and take a ship to their grandparents in England. Carrying out his plan the two children get a ride to the next town, Williams, and walk even further towards Quindanning. The police and Tom start looking for them.

The children meet Frank Smith, an Aboriginal Australian who takes them to his mother's house. The Thompsons offer a 50-pound reward, and Sergeant Rawling takes over the search. Frank decides not to turn them in for the reward and instead to guide them to Perth. Along the way, Andy steals some groceries for food, alerting the police to home in even closer on their location. The Premier of Western Australia starts putting pressure on the police to find the kids as there has been unfavourable press coverage.

Sergeant Rawling hires Danny Wandi, the best aboriginal tracker, to find the kids. He locates them, but as he is Frank Smith's cousin he leads the police on a wild goose chase that leads them to Tom's campsite. The Thompsons double the reward and decide they want to adopt the kids. Frank and the two kids get a ride in a truck headed towards Pinjarra and the coastal city of Mandurah, all the time staying just ahead of Tom, who finally catches up with them in the jungle, likely somewhere near the Dwellingup area. While all four are together in the bush, a brush fire breaks out and Tom is killed as they flee to a river.

Towards the close, the kids and Frank have lunch with the Premier, who attempts to save political face and to entice them to stay in Australia. However, Andy and Sammy decide to move to England to stay with their grandparents.

== Cast ==
- Dan O'Herlihy as 'Uncle' Tom Caseley
- Ernie Dingo as Frank Smith
- Andre Jansen as Andy Dean
- Tina Kemp as Sammy Dean
- Maggie Wilde-West as Molly Thompson
- Geoffrey Atkins as Burt Thompson
- Michael Carman as Sergeant Rawling
- Robert Faggetter as Dave Brown
- Ken Colbung as Danny Wandi
- Geoff Gibbs as The Premier
- Mawuyul Yanthalawuy as Mary Smith
- John Adam as Old Man
