= Hobart Film Society =

Australian film society

The Hobart Film Society (HFS) is the oldest continually operating film society in Australia.

== History ==
Founded on 14 May 1946, the HFS originally aimed to screen niché films, such as independent, foreign-language and arthouse films that would otherwise not have an opportunity to be screened in Tasmania.

By 1953 it was the largest film society in Australia, with 800 members. The HFS commenced screenings at the Hydro-Electric Commission Theatrette, and later at the State Cinema. Other venues have included the Avalon Theatre, Cinema One (former Tatler Newsreel Theatre, underground at 86 Murray Street), West End Twin Cinemas (later Village Cinema), the Geology Theatre at the University of Tasmania, Dechaineux Theatre and the Philip Smith Centre in Glebe. Early venues had the capacity to screen either 16mm or 35mm films. 35mm projection was always done by professional projectionists while 16mm projection was done by committee members. HFS screened its first DVD in 2005, and digital has since become the dominant means of projection.

In the 1980s, the HFS curated weekly exhibitions for the State Cinema as part of the AFI Cinémathèque circuit. The society projected mostly classic and foreign language films, including Jesus of Montreal, Wings of Desire, and The Killing Fields, which included a Q&A with actor Haing S. Ngor, a qualified surgeon, gynecologist and survivor of the Khmer Rouge regime in Cambodia.

Membership for the HFS has varied over the years peaking at 1,774 in 1983. In 2021, there were 143 members.

=== Hobart International Film Festival ===
The HFS curated the annual Hobart International Film Festivals between 1974 and 1992, which were often attended by several hundred members and non-members.

== See also ==
- List of theatres in Hobart
