= State Cinema, North Hobart =

Historic cinema venue in North Hobart, Tasmania, Australia

State Cinema
- North Hobart Picture Palace, Liberty Theatre, State Theatre
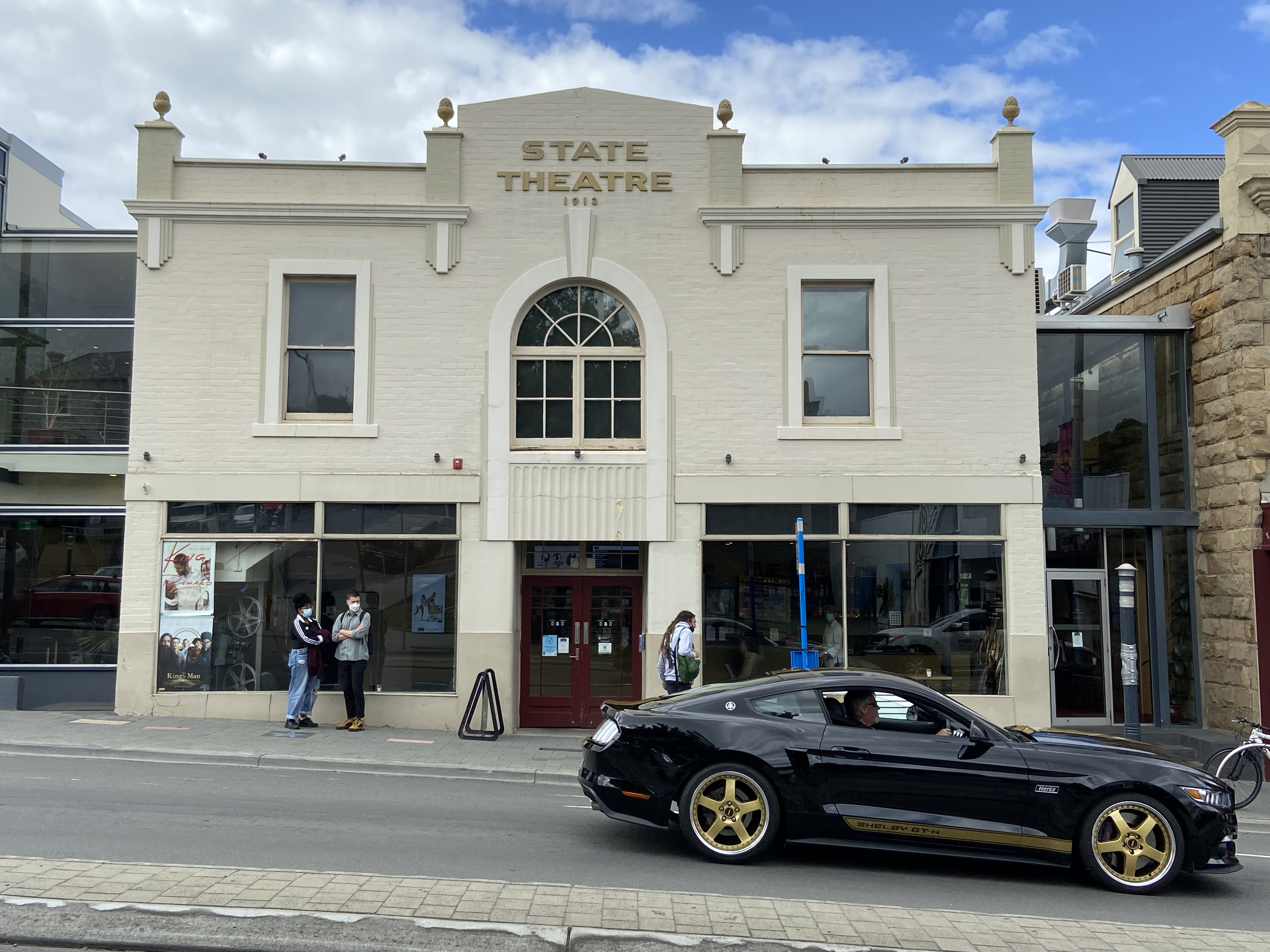
- The State Cinema in 2022
- Interactive map of State Cinema
- Address: 375 Elizabeth Street, North Hobart, Tasmania; Australia
- Coordinates: 42°52′20.75″S 147°18′53.03″E
- Owner: Reading Cinemas
- Capacity: 700, 11 screens
- Current use: cinema

Construction
- Opened: 2 October 1913; 113 years ago
- Years active: 1913–1920, 1935–present

Website
- www.statecinema.com.au

The State Cinema (formally known as the State Theatre, colloquially known as "the State") is a historic cinema venue located in North Hobart, Tasmania. Its cinema operations were acquired by the US-owned Reading Cinemas chain in November 2019.

== History ==
Originally designed with seating for 412 patrons, the venue officially opened as the North Hobart Picture Palace on 2 October 1913. The theatre housed the North Hobart Concert Band until 1920, when the waning cost of the Great War, Spanish flu and growing competition from theatres in the city centre caused the venue to close all together. Subsequently, the cinema became a billiard hall, gymnasium and boxing venue.

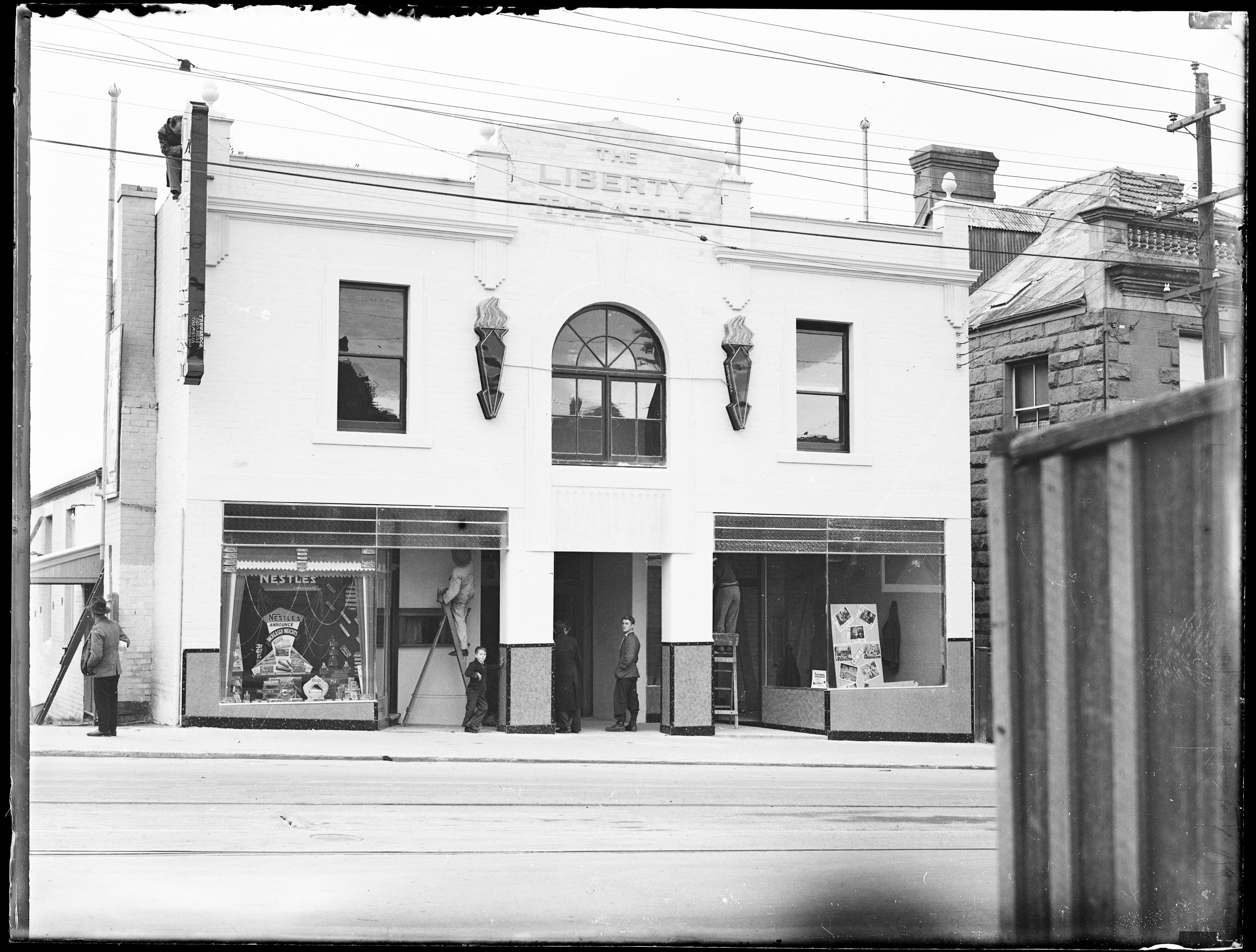
Liberty Theatre - Elizabeth St, Hobart (29 June 1935)

=== Liberty Theatre ===
After extensive renovations, the venue re-opened as the Liberty Theatre on 29 June 1935 by the Lord Mayor of Hobart Mr. J. J. Wignall with The Gay Divorcee and We're Rich Again. The cinema was remodelled in an Art Deco appearance, with an Australian-made Raycophone sound system and locally made finishes such as lampshades, woodwork and curtains showcasing Tasmanian craftsmanship. Alterations were also made to the facade, including affixing large neon lighting and stylised burning torches. Wall decorations were designed by Mr. G. Harrex, lamp shades were supplied by Trowbridge and Co., the woodwork undertaken by Crisp and Gunn Co-operative Ltd., and the stage curtain by Modern Art Furnishers. The architect for the alterations was Mr. A. Lauriston Crisp.

On 18 August 1948 it was renamed State Theatre.

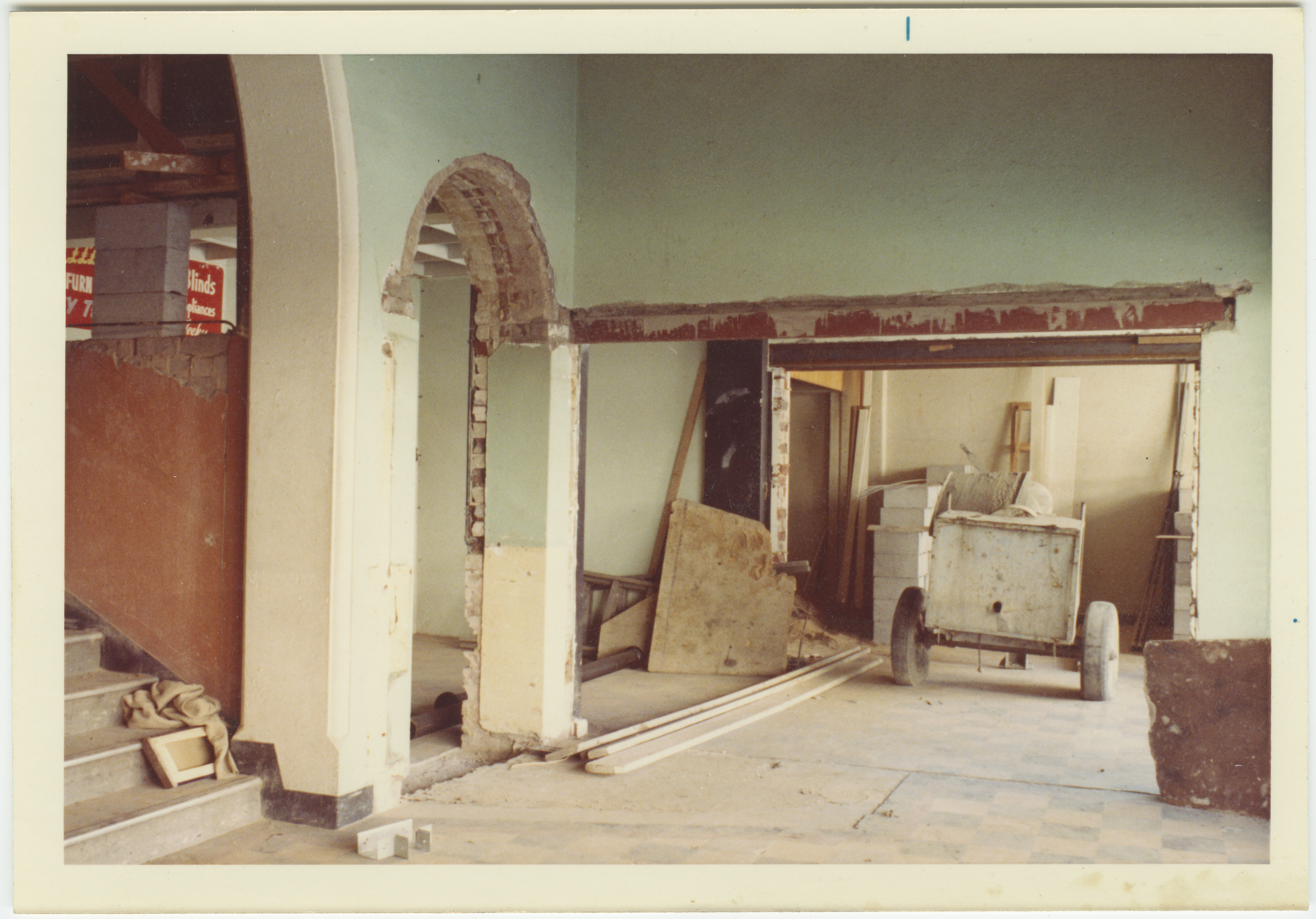
State Cinema undergoing renovations in 1970

=== AFI State Cinema ===
Labor prime minister Gough Whitlam attended the grand re-opening of the State Cinema after it was purchased by the government-funded Australian Film Institute in 1976. The State Cinema hosted the premiere of Manganinnie, the first feature-length film produced by the Tasmanian Film Corporation in August 1980. The premiere was attended by actors Mawuyul Yanthalawuy and Anna Ralph, as well as the Governor of Tasmania Sir Stanley Burbury and Tasmanian Premier Doug Lowe.

In the 1980s, the Hobart Film Society curated weekly exhibitions for the State Cinema as part of the AFI Cinémathèque circuit. The society projected mostly classic and foreign language films, including Jesus of Montreal, Wings of Desire, and The Killing Fields, which included a question and answer (Q & A) session with actor Haing S. Ngor, a survivor of the Khmer Rouge regime in Cambodia and the only actor of Asian descent to win an Academy Award for Best Supporting Actor until 2022.

In 1994, Dutch-Australian film director Paul Cox premiered his film Exile at the State Cinema, which was followed by a Q & A.

=== State Cinema ===
The State was purchased by North Hobart businessman John Kelly in 2002. Extra screens were added in 2006, and by 2014 it had eight screens, and offered over 700 seats, plus a rooftop cinema and bar.

A star on the footpath of the State Cinema was added to commemorate the 100th birthday of Tasmanian actor Errol Flynn on 20 June 2009. It was unveiled by his daughter Rory Flynn and grandson Sean Flynn.

American actor Willem Dafoe attended the Tasmanian premiere of The Hunter at a red carpet event held at the State Cinema in 2011. Director Daniel Nettheim and Tasmanian premier Lara Giddings were also in attendance.

On 5 April 2012, Tasmanian author Richard Flanagan officially opened the State Cinema Bookstore at the site.

A special red carpet charity event for the premiere of Lion was attended by the film's subject, Saroo Brierley and his family at the State in December 2016.

In 2019, the State Cinema had 11 screens in operation, including a rooftop cinema, cafe, bar and bookstore. In November 2019, State Cinema was acquired from its owner John Kelly by the American cinema chain Reading Cinemas. By November 2026, State Cinema had become a branch of Reading's subsidiary, Angelika Cinemas.

== Film festivals ==
The State Cinema hosts several national film festival events, including the Alliance Française French Film Festival, Japanese Film Festival, Lavazza Italian Film Festival, and Taiwan Film Festival in Australia. The Hobart Film Society, Australia's oldest continually operating film society, curated the annual Hobart International Film Festivals between 1974 and 1992 at the State, which were often attended by several hundred members and non-members.

== Controversies ==
In October 2021, the State Cinema screened Nitram, a film about the life of the gunman of the Port Arthur Massacre in spite of protest from locals and survivors of the event. The State Cinema displayed no posters or advertising of the Tasmanian premiere as a means to avoid offence.

== See also ==
- List of theatres in Hobart

== Sources ==
- Clyde, Bill (2013). A Century of Cinema: The Life & Times of the State Cinema. North Hobart, Tasmania: State Cinema. ISBN 978-0-646-90967-7.
