= Reading Cinemas =

Chain of movie theaters in Australia and New Zealand

- Type: Subsidiary
- Industry: Cinema
- Area served: United States, New Zealand, Australia
- Key people: Ellen Cotter (Chairman, President & CEO); Mark Douglas (Managing Director - Australia and New Zealand)
- Parent: Reading International
- Website: readingcinemasus.com (US) readingcinemas.co.nz (NZ) readingcinemas.com.au (AU)

Reading Cinemas (/ˈrɛdɪŋ/ RED-ing) is a group of cinema chains operating in the United States, New Zealand, and Australia. It is owned by Reading International (Nasdaq: RDI), which also owns the off-Broadway Minetta Lane Theatre and Orpheum Theatre in New York.

== History ==
=== 20th century ===
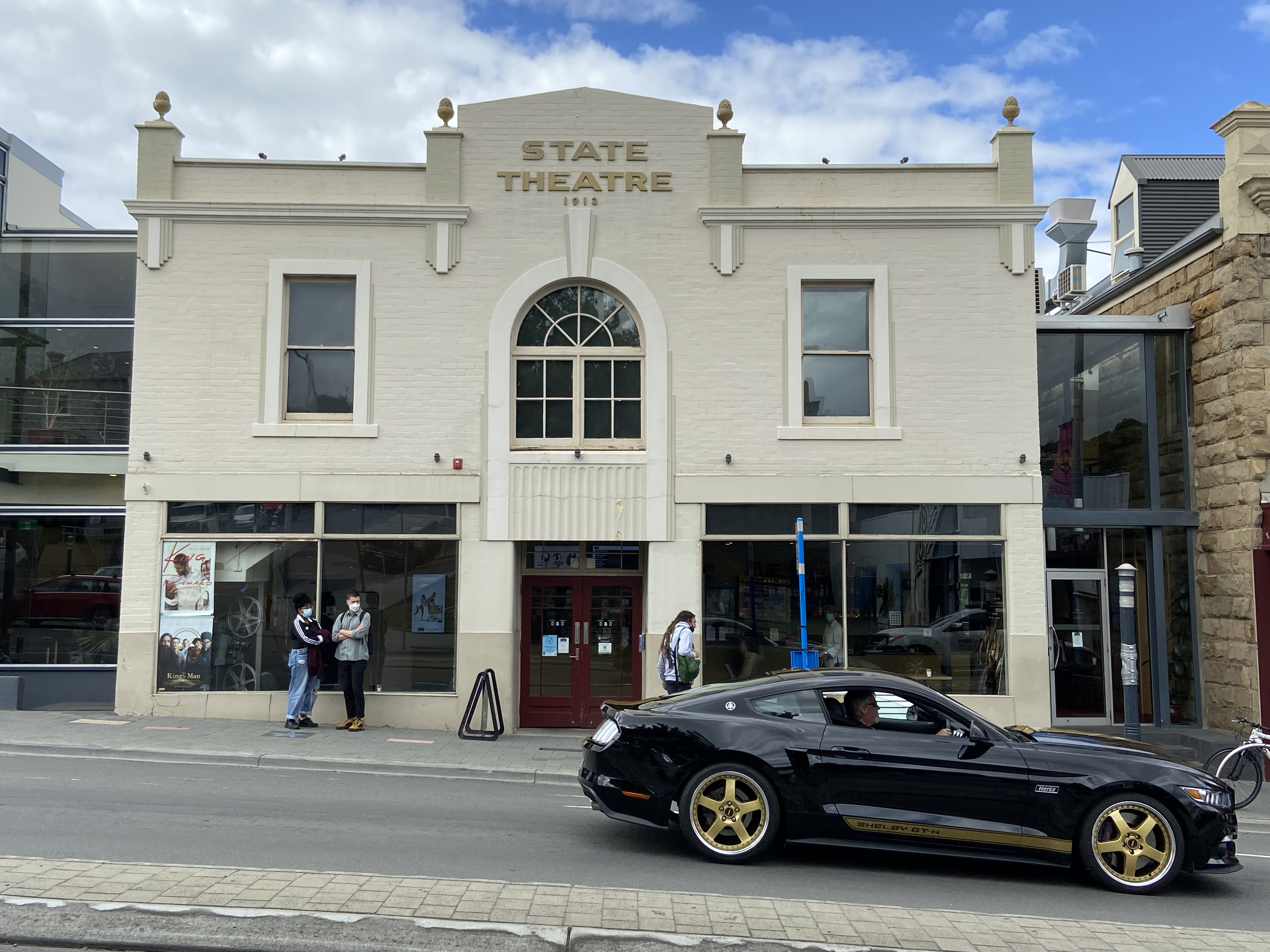
State Cinema, North Hobart, in Tasmania, Australia, was acquired by Reading Cinemas in November 2019.

In the late 1980s, through his holding company the Craig Corporation, Los Angeles–based lawyer James Cotter acquired the Reading Company, a former American railroad company that held a portfolio of real estate properties after it sold its railroad assets and rolling stock in 1976. Through the rest of the 1990s, Cotter acquired, developed, and operated real estate properties, focusing on cinema exhibitors and live theatre operators. Most of the company's holdings by this time were located far beyond the company's historical native ground of eastern Pennsylvania.

Reading entered the Australia market in 1995 and the New Zealand market two years later, in 1997, developing a chain of multiplex cinemas that operated under the Reading banner and exhibited mainstream films. In the United States, Reading pursued a more offbeat business direction, acquiring an art-house theatre at the historic Cable Building in New York City in 1996 that operated under the name Angelika Film Center, a brand that it owns. The company also acquired and expanded a chain of multiplex cinemas throughout the island of Puerto Rico.

By 1996, Cotter reorganized the company as Reading Entertainment, a Delaware corporation, and on 31 December 2001, both Reading Entertainment and Craig Corporation merged into and with Citadel Holding Corporation, another Cotter company.

=== 21st century ===
Cotter died in August 2014, leaving his investment in the company in trusts that have been subjected to multiple years of litigation between his designated successor CEO, his son James Jr., and his daughters (Jr.'s sisters), Ellen and Margaret.

In July 2014, Reading Cinemas opened a branch at the former Hoyts cinema complex in Dunedin's Octagon. The company spent NZ$5.5 million in renovating and refitting the former Hoyts site including an industry-themed lobby design. The cinema's opening was delayed due to earthquake strengthening work.

In 2015, James Jr. was ousted by his sisters and a majority of the board of Reading International and Ellen Cotter subsequently was named CEO.

In 2023, Mayor of Wellington Tory Whanau and the Wellington Council had voted to give council staff the approval to negotiate the NZ$32 million agreement to refurbish and earthquake-strengthen the Wellington building, which housed the historic Wellington theater, but had been closed since 2019. In April 2024, the Wellington City Council exited the agreement, citing Reading's inability to come up with its share of the investment.

In November 2026, Reading Cinemas acquired Rialto Cinemas Dunedin, bringing the New Zealand city's two main cinemas under its ownership. The Rialto Dunedin theatre complex will be rebranded as "Angelika Cinemas Dunedin," marking Angelika Cinemas's foray into the New Zealand market.

== See also ==
- Angelika Film Center
- Consolidated Theatres
