= Prince of Wales Theatre, Hobart =

Theatre in Hobart, Tasmania

Prince of Wales Theatre
- Grand Empire Theatre
- Interactive map of Prince of Wales Theatre
- Address: 85 Macquarie Street; Hobart, Tasmania; Australia
- Coordinates: 42°52′54.03″S 147°19′52.89″E
- Capacity: 1,800 (1911), 843 (1983)

Construction
- Opened: 31 December 1910; 115 years ago
- Closed: 1987; 39 years ago
- Years active: 1910-1987
- Architect: Douglas Salier

The Prince of Wales Theatre was a theatre on Macquarie Street, Hobart, Tasmania from 1910 to 1987.

== History ==
Designed by architect Douglas Salier, the Grand Empire Theatre was opened by the Hon. J. W. Evans on 31 December 1910 in the presence of the Governor of Tasmania, Sir Harry Barron, Lady Clara Emily Barron, Premier of Tasmania Sir Elliott Lewis and other Hobart notables. The theatre, which took less than six months to build, was designed to seat 1,800 patrons (500 in the dress circle and the rest in the front and back stalls). It was fitted with tip-up seats of modern design, with plush upholstery for those in the dress circle.

The theatre was found to be structurally defective and underwent multiple alternations throughout the 1920s. Owner Edwin Herbert Webster rebuilt the auditorium to seat 900 in partnership with architect firm Walker & Johnston in 1924. The venue reopened as the Prince of Wales Theatre with the stage play The Glad Eye (based on Le Zebre by Paul Armont) starring Zillah Bateman on Boxing Day, 1924. Later Webster deemed the venue space unsuitable for stage plays, and the Prince of Wales commenced screening Paramount Pictures exclusively from 1925. The façade and foyer areas were renovated in 1926 and 1928 by contractors J. Dunn and Sons. In 1938, Hoyts Theatres Ltd acquired the leases for both the Princes of Wales and the Princess Theatre, Launceston. Following this arrangement, the theatre widely adopted the "Prince" moniker in advertising.

The theatre is best remembered for when it was managed by silent film star Louise Lovely and her second husband Berty Cowan throughout the 1940s and 1950s:

"Lovely was herself a drawcard, running the sweet shop and was said to have made the best milkshakes in Hobart."

In October 1954, the Prince of Wales became the first cinema in Tasmania equipped with Cinemascope. The same month, the biblical-epic The Robe, was exhibited simultaneously at the Prince and Princess Theatres, marking the first dual city film premiere in Tasmania. The Hobart event was attended by the Governor Sir Ronald Cross, the High Commissioner for the United Kingdom in Australia Sir Stephen Holmes and Lady Holmes, Tasmanian Premier Robert Cosgrove, the Lord Mayor (Mr. Park, M.H.A.) and Mrs. Park, State officials, and other Hobart notables.

=== Decline ===
In spite the central location of the Prince, competition became dire after Village Cinemas opened the entirely new West End Twin theatre complex on Collins Street, Hobart in 1976. Hoyts opened another single-screen theatre, Hoyts Mid City in the basement of the nearby T & G building in 1982 as a means to attract some of their business. However the multiplex itself, the first of its kind in Tasmania, was too alluring a concept for the general public. In 1983, the West End Twin's Cinema 1 had capacity for 609 patrons and Cinema 2 for 401. The Prince had a seating capacity of 843, and the Hoyts Mid City had capacity for 400. Financing both venues lead to a steady decline of the Prince's interiors. By the mid 80s, the Prince had ceased trading as a cinema.

The Prince was leased to the Tasmanian Theatre Trust, who revamped the cinema into a live theatre venue following a fire at the Theatre Royal in June 1984. After two years of operating as a theatre, the Prince closed in 1986 and demolished in September 1987 for a carpark and office tower. In 1988, the West End Twin underwent renovations, expanded to 7 screens and was renamed Village Cinemas. Hoyts closed the Mid City location in the early 1990s; which saw the company's complete withdrawal from Tasmania.

== See also ==
List of theatres in Hobart
