= Manganinnie =

- Promotional movie poster for the film
- Directed by: John Honey
- Written by: Ken Kelso; Beth Roberts (novel)
- Produced by: Gilda Baracchi
- Starring: Mawuyul Yanthalawuy; Anna Ralph
- Cinematography: Gary Hansen
- Edited by: Mike Woolveridge
- Music by: Peter Sculthorpe
- Distributed by: GUO; Umbrella Entertainment
- Release date: 15 August 1980 (Australia)
- Running time: 90 minutes
- Country: Australia
- Language: English
- Budget: A$481,000

Manganinnie is an AFI Award-winning 1980 film which follows the journey of Manganinnie, a Tasmanian Aboriginal woman who searches for her tribe with the company of a lost white girl named Joanna. Based on Beth Roberts' novel of the same name, it was directed by John Honey and was the first feature film to be financed by the short-lived Tasmanian Film Corporation.

== Synopsis ==
During the Black War of 1830 in the penal colony of Van Diemen's Land, Manganinnie survives a raid on her village. She finds the body of her husband, Meenopeekameena, and builds him a funeral pyre.

The grieving Manganinnie journeys across vast mountains and rivers towards the coast in search of the rest of her tribe. She finds Joanna, a lost white girl, along her way. The pair develop a bond for each other despite not having a common language. Manganinnie teaches Joanna some of her traditional knowledge, and eventually initiates her into her tribe.

Ultimately however, Manganinnie comes to realise that her people and way of life has been destroyed by encroachment from white settlers. When Joanna is asleep, she carries the girl back to her family.

Joanna struggles to adapt back to life with her family. One day Manganinnie's body is found, and Joanna gives her old friend a traditional funeral using the lessons she has learned.

== Production ==
Filming took place in the West Coast Range and started on 12 November 1979 and ran for five weeks.

Anna Ralph (aged 7 at the time), who played the little white girl Joanna, is now an Associate Professor of infectious diseases working at Royal Darwin Hospital looking after patients, including Aboriginal peoples.

== Reception ==
The State Cinema hosted the Australian premiere of Manganinnie in August 1980. The event was attended by Mawuyul Yanthalawuy and Ralph, as well as the Governor of Tasmania Sir Stanley Burbury and Tasmanian Premier Doug Lowe.

Despite the grim subject matter the film recovered its costs and made a small profit.

== Awards ==
- Won AFI Award, Peter Sculthorpe – Best Original Music Score (1980)
- Won AWGIE Awards – Best Screenplay (1980)
- Winner 12th Moscow International Children's Film Festival – Best Production Design (1980)
- Winner Festival International de France (1980)

== See also ==
- Cinema of Australia
