= Angelika Film Center =

Movie theater chain in the United States

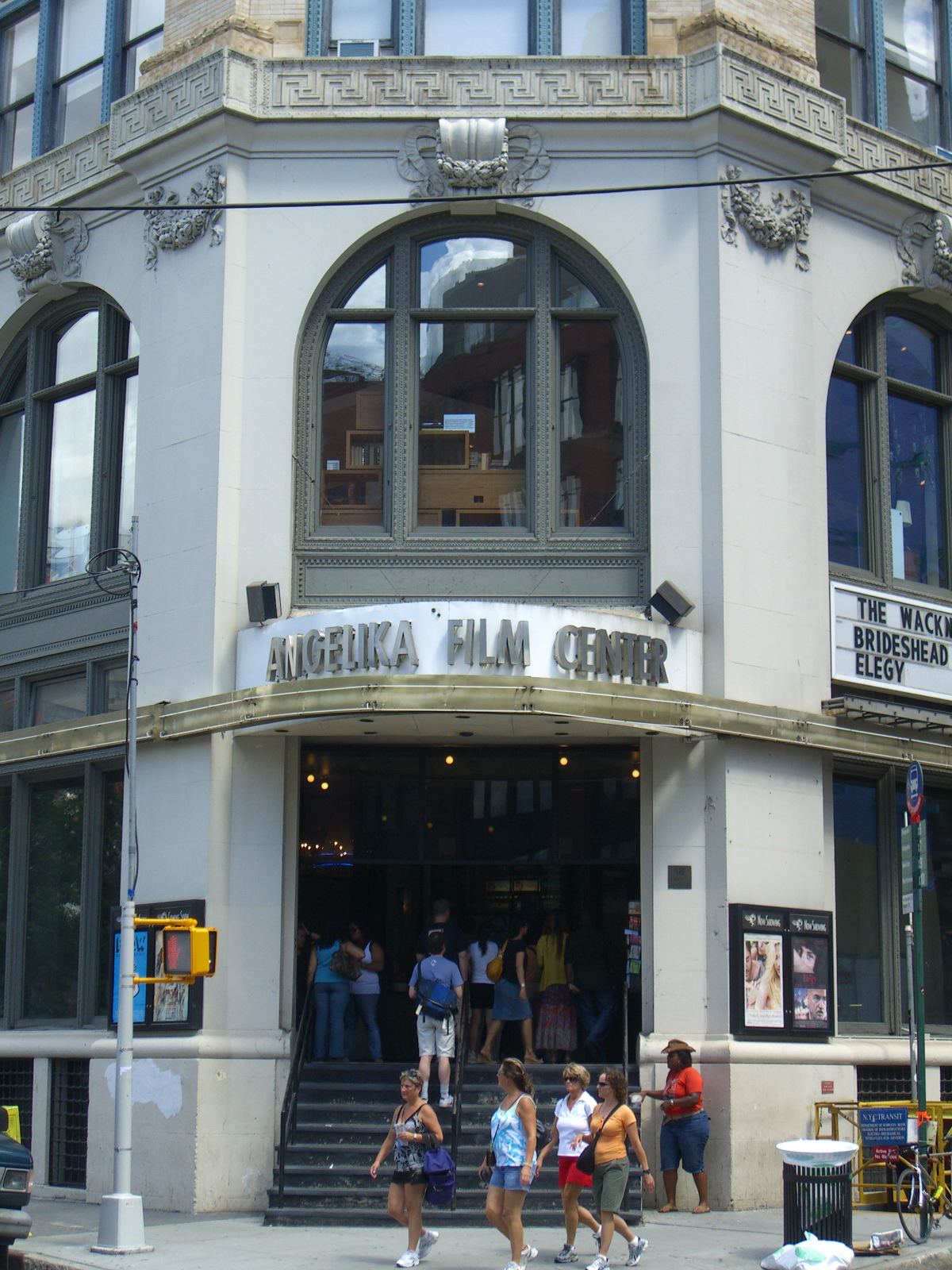
- The New York Angelika at The Cable Building in Manhattan's Greenwich Village
- Type: Brand
- Founded: September 19, 1989; 37 years ago
- Number of locations: 9
- Parent: Reading International
- Website: www.angelikafilmcenter.com

Angelika Film Center is a movie theater chain in the United States and Australia that features independent and foreign films. It operates theaters in New York City, Texas, Washington, D.C., California, Virginia, Queensland and Tasmania. Its headquarters are in New York City.

== History and locations ==
=== Flagship location (The Cable Building, NoHo, New York City) ===
The original Angelika Film Center & Café was opened by film producers Joseph and Angelika Saleh in 1989. The New York Angelika, which is located at The Cable Building on the corner of Houston and Mercer Streets, is the flagship cinema.

=== Other locations ===
Additionally, Angelika Film Center has opened six additional locations, one of which has closed:

- In 1997, it opened a theater in Houston, which was closed August 29, 2010.
- In 2001, an Angelika opened in the Mockingbird Station in Dallas, Texas
- In 2004, an Angelika opened in Plano, Texas.
- In the fall of 2012, an Angelika opened an eight-screen theater in the Mosaic District of Fairfax County, Virginia.
- In the summer of 2014, Angelika started operating a "Pop-Up" theater in Union Market in Washington, D.C., with plans for an expansion that ultimately fell through in the summer of 2016.
- On October 9, 2015, a new location opened in San Diego's North County, which was converted from a Reading Cinemas, another brand under its parent company, Reading International.
- Village East by Angelika in New York City, built in 1926, opened under the Angelika brand in 2021
- State Cinema in North Hobart, Tasmania, built in 1913 and acquired by Reading Cinemas in 2019. By November 2026, State Cinema had become a branch of Angelika Cinemas.
- Woolloongabba, Queensland
- In November 2026, Reading Cinemas acquired the Rialto Cinema theatre in Dunedin, New Zealand and confirmed plans to rebrand it as Angelika Cinemas Dunedin in December 2026. This marks Angelika's first foray into the New Zealand market.

Angelika 57, an art cinema in midtown Manhattan on 57th Street between Broadway and Seventh Avenue, operated between 1993 and 1997.

=== Additional history ===
From 1997 to 2005, the Angelika Film Center was used as the set for At The Angelika, a weekly TV series distributed by IFC Films. The show moved to the IFC Center on Sixth Avenue and changed its name to At the IFC Center when that venue opened in June 2005.

The Angelika launched a blog where they post their own video and written interviews with directors and actors that are involved with the films they show.

The Angelika Film Center is owned by Reading International and iDNA, Inc.

In Snowball Effect: The Story of Clerks (on the Clerks X DVD) Kevin Smith and Vincent Pereira recall attending movies at the Angelika (notably Richard Linklater's debut Slacker). The film also mentions the disastrous first public screening of Clerks at the Independent Film Feature Market (the IFFM) and has a scene with Smith and Scott Mosier standing outside the theatre.

In November 2015, Shia LaBeouf invited the public to join him in the Cable Building location as he watched the 29 movies that feature him back-to-back. While taking short coffee breaks, LaBeouf could be viewed almost continuously on a live-stream.

On March 5, 2021, they rebranded the Cinema 123 in Midtown Manhattan and Village East Cinemas in Greenwich Village under Branded by Angelika. Both theaters previously operated as City Cinemas before their purchase in 2000 by Citadel Cinemas, an affiliate of Reading Entertainment, which were in turn consolidated on December 31, 2001, to form Reading International, the parent company of Reading Cinemas, which owns and operates the Angelika Film Center.

== See also ==
- List of art cinemas in New York City
