= Rialto Cinema, Dunedin =

Multiplex cinema in Dunedin, New Zealand

Coordinates: 45°52′32″S 170°30′08″E

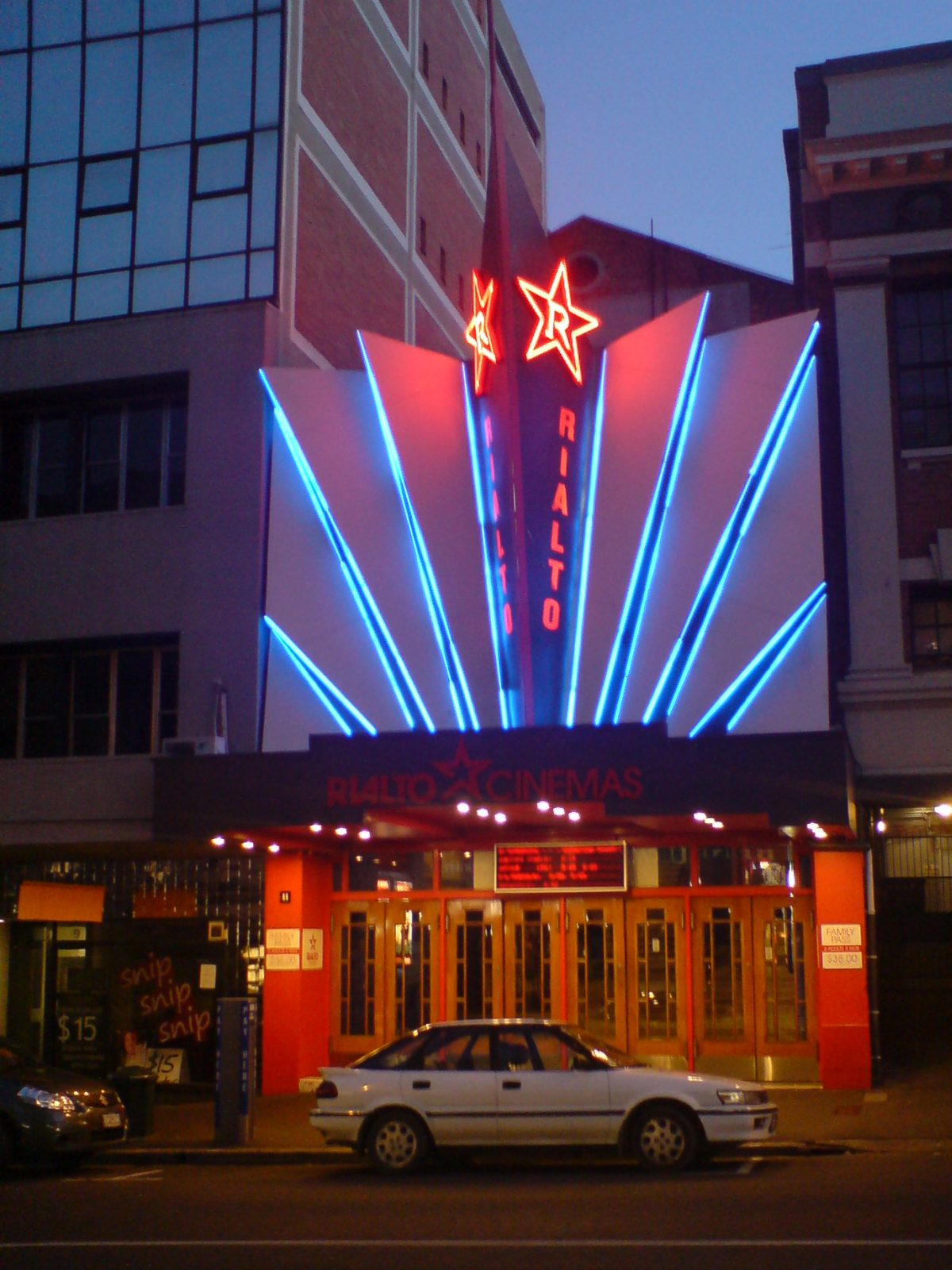
Image of Rialto Cinema, Dunedin

The Rialto Cinema is a multiplex cinema located in the New Zealand city of Dunedin. It was opened as Rialto Cinemas in September 1999. In November 2026, Rialto Cinemas Dunedin was acquired by international cinema chain Reading International, who announced that it would be rebranded as Angelika Cinemas Dunedin from early December 2026.

== History ==
The Rialto's location is a historic building in Moray Place, some 200 metres southwest of the city centre. The building was designed by noted architect Edmund Anscombe, and was first opened in 1916 as the Empire (later Empire DeLuxe) Theatre. With a 2,000 seat capacity, it was for a while New Zealand's second-largest cinema (after Auckland's St. James Theatre. The building was taken over during the 1920s by Thomas O'Brien, and extensively redesigned in a faux Moorish style, with a twinkling starry interior ceiling and minarets. In the late 1930s, the foyer was remodelled in the then popular Art Deco style.

The cinema was operated as part of the Kerridge-Odeon chain of cinemas from the end of World War II until 1993. It was renamed as the St. James Theatre in 1952, undergoing major renovations at the same time, though parts of the earlier Moorish and Art Deco stylings were retained. In 1993 the cinema was closed, and was briefly operated as a nightclub and restaurant whilst a major overhaul was undertaken. The complex reopened as a three-screen multiplex (expanded to five then six in the second half of 2004) under its current name in September 1999, at which time it became part of the Event Cinemas' Rialto Cinemas group. The new renovations by Walker Cinema Architects saw the restoration of much of the original interior including the starry ceiling in the main theatre, as well as the uncovering of several of the Moorish styled interior arches and wrought iron work.

On 19 November 2026, the Otago Daily Times reported that Rialto Cinemas Dunedin had been acquired by international cinema chain Reading International, which also owned the Reading Cinemas Dunedin theatre in The Octagon. Rialto Dunedin's manager Craig Robinson confirmed that the cinema complex would be rebranded as Angelika Cinemas Dunedin on 4 December 2026, marking the American-based Angelika Film Center's first entry into the New Zealand market. Rialto Dunedin will be closed between 30 November and 3 December to facilitate changes to the system. While EVT (Entertainment, Ventures Travel) confirmed it would end its joint partnership with Rialto Dunedin, a spokesperson for the New Zealand International Film Festival confirmed that their films would continue to be screened at Angelika Cinemas Dunedin. Reading International's acquisition does not include the Rialto Cinema in Auckland.

== Heritage status ==
The building is listed as a Category I historic place in the registry of the New Zealand Historic Places Trust. In the trust's registry it is noted for its elaborate interior features, and as a rare example of a surviving "atmospheric theatre". Several technological features or historic note are also listed. In its notes on its status as an Atmospheric Theatre, the trust indicate its "use of exotic historic architectural design themes to create the illusion of a romantic courtyard or amphitheatre, and... use of special concealed lighting effects to further the illusion... by creating a night sky effect on the ceiling of the auditorium. The illusion of the courtyard/amphitheatre was cleverly done by creating in plaster the design features of a pergola, such as classical or eastern columns with entablatures or architraves, and blind arcades, again in either classical or exotic eastern architectural forms.... [The structure includes] a ceiling of smooth plaster painted electric blue, and curved from behind the side walls without interruption or blemish. Onto this ceiling the illusion of a night sky was projected."
