= Geoff Gibbs =

Australian actor

Geoff Gibbs AM
- Born: Geoffrey George Gibbs; 25 November 1940; Kalgoorlie, Western Australia
- Died: 17 August 2006 (aged 65); Perth, Western Australia
- Occupation: Actor
- Known for: Principal of Western Australian Academy of Performing Arts

Geoffrey George Gibbs AM (25 November 1940 – 17 August 2006) was an Australian actor and acting teacher.

== Biography ==
Gibbs was born in Kalgoorlie, Western Australia, in 1940, and was educated at Aquinas College, Perth. He studied for bachelor's and master's degrees in arts at the University of Western Australia, and later a PhD from Ohio State University in the United States.

Gibbs was founding dean of dramatic arts at the Western Australian Academy of Performing Arts (WAAPA) from 1979 to 1988, and trained several of Australia's best-known actors, including Hugh Jackman, Frances O'Connor, Lisa McCune and William McInnes. In 1988, he was made chairman of the International Foundation for Arts and Culture, a non-profit organisation formed to promote the creation of new work and cultural and artistic residencies.

== Honours ==
Gibbs was made a Member of the Order of Australia (AM) in the 2002 Queen's Birthday Honours, for service to the performing arts through the establishment, development and promotion of the Western Australian Academy of Performing Arts, and through professional associations.

In October 2007, the Academy Theatre at WAAPA was renamed the Geoff Gibbs Theatre in his honour. The ceremony at which the theatre was renamed was officiated by star graduate Hugh Jackman.
