= Mawuyul Yanthalawuy =

Indigenous Australian educator and actor

Mawuyul Yanthalawuy AM (c. 1939 – 18 November 2024) was an Indigenous Australian educator and actor.

Yanthalawuy, from Elcho Island in the Northern Territory, was teaching in a pre-school in Darwin when she was chosen to play the title role in the 1980 film Manganinnie. She was nominated for an Australian Film Institute Award for Best Actress for this debut performance. Her other film and television credits include Women of the Sun (Penguin Award winner for Best Single Performance by an Actress in television), We of the Never Never, A Waltz Through the Hills, and Bedevil.

Yanthalaway was appointed a Member of the Order of Australia in the General Division (AM) in 1991 for service to education and to Aboriginal culture.

She died peacefully in Darwin on 18 November 2024, aged 85.
