= Consolidated Theatres (North Carolina) =

Consolidated Theaters
- Type: Brand
- Industry: Entertainment
- Founded: 1990; 36 years ago
- Defunct: May 1, 2008; 18 years ago
- Fate: Acquired by Regal Entertainment Group
- Headquarters: Charlotte, North Carolina, United States
- Areas served: Southeastern United States
- Key people: Herman Stone (Founder, CEO)
- Website: Archived official website at the Wayback Machine (archive index)

Consolidated Theaters was a movie theater chain based in Charlotte, North Carolina. The company owned over 28 theaters and 400 movie screens in 6 states along the East Coast. Most of its theaters are now operated by several other theater chains. Its first theater was the Park Terrace in Charlotte, North Carolina. Founded by Herman Stone, it was once part of The Stone Group. The theaters usually had upwards of 10 auditoriums, which in some cases, drove older competitors with fewer screens out of business. Consolidated Theaters was acquired by Regal Entertainment Group on May 1, 2008. As a condition of approval of the acquisition, the United States Department of Justice required that Regal sell 4 theaters in the Charlotte and Raleigh, North Carolina markets to Charlotte based Carolina Cinemas (which was bought by Cinemark Theatres in early 2016) to ensure continued competition.

On 7 September 2022, Cineworld, the current parent company of Consolidated Theatres, filed for Chapter 11 bankruptcy.
