= Consolidated Theatres (Hawaii) =

Cinema chain in Hawaii, United States

- Type: Subsidiary
- Industry: Entertainment
- Founded: 1917
- Number of locations: 6
- Products: movie theaters
- Owner: Reading International
- Website: Official website

Consolidated Theatres is a Hawaii-based movie theater chain founded in 1917. It operates six locations in the state as of August 2023, and is one of two major cinema chains in Hawaiʻi, with the other being Regal Cinemas. It screens first-run feature films, as well as some arthouse and independent films along with films from Asia.

It is one of the affiliated cinema chains operated under Reading International.

== History ==
In 1899, Joel C. Cohen rented the Orpheum Theatre in downtown Honolulu staging live vaudeville performances. Directors of the company included Prince David Kawānanakoa, Prince Jonah Kūhiō Kalanianaʻole and Gus Schuman. Around 1910, Cohen transitioned to motion pictures, and acquired Honolulu Amusement Co. in 1914. He incorporated his company as Consolidated Amusement Co. in 1917.

In 1958 Consolidated Amusement Co. was sold to investors in Oklahoma for $8 million. At the time, Consolidated Amusement operated 18 theaters and held 75 percent of TV station KGMB and a radio station. Pacific Theatres acquired the movie theaters of the company in 1959, forming Consolidated Theatres.

In February 2008, Reading International Inc. purchased Consolidated Theatres from Pacific Theatres for $69 million.

== Locations ==
Consolidated operates six locations in Hawaii, all on Oʻahu. Some locations also screen major films from Asian countries, notably the Philippines, South Korea, Japan, and Mainland China. Consolidated Kahala also functions an arthouse theater, screening many specialized and indie films; it also hosts the Hawaiʻi International Film Festival.

The chain opened a dine-in "luxury" cinema known as ʻŌlino in October 2016.

Current locations operated by the chain are:

- Consolidated Ward (Honolulu)
- Consolidated Kahala (Honolulu)
- ʻŌlino by Consolidated Theatres (Kapolei)
- Consolidated Mililani
- Consolidated Pearlridge (ʻAiea)
- Consolidated Kapolei

The Koʻolau Center location in ʻĀhuimanu closed in April 2021. July 2023 saw the closure of both Maui's Consolidated Kaʻahumanu in Kahului (the last remaining location outside Oʻahu) and Consolidated Koko Marina in Hawaiʻi Kai, East Honolulu.

On November 18, 1999, Consolidated Theaters closed the Hawaii Cinerama, located on 1550 S. King Street. The single-screen theater originally opened in 1929 as the Pawaa Theater was refurbished and reopened as the Hawaii Cinerama in December 1962 with "Super-Cinerama" features, which included showing Cinerama three-strip features. The theater debuted with The Wonderful World of the Brothers Grimm, and showed 70mm films. Its final movie was The Insider. The theater's Cinerama projectors were reinstalled at the Hollywood Cinerama Dome in 2002, operated by Pacific Theatres, its parent company at the time.

The Waikiki 1 and 2 (333 Seaside Avenue), as well as the Waikiki 3 (2285 Kalākaua Avenue) theaters were closed in November 21, 2002, with Consolidated Theaters citing low attendance. The theaters were some of the largest of the company's properties, with the Waikiki 3 seating about 1,200 and the Waikiki 1 and 2 seating about 900 each. The Waikiki 3 was also noted for its interior, with concrete coconut trees and banana palms as well as a Robert Morton theater organ. The Waikiki 3 originally opened as the Waikiki Theatre in November of 1936 and was dedicated to Joel C. Cohen. The Waikiki 3's name was changed in 1969 because of the opening of the adjoining Waikiki 1 and 2. The Waikiki 1 and 2 theaters were opened on September 23, 1970, with Waikiki 1 hosting the world premiere of Tora! Tora! Tora!, with other theaters in Los Angeles, New York and Tokyo.

== Features ==
Consolidated offers Reading Cinemas' premium large format known as "Titan Luxe," featuring projection in 4K resolution on roughly 80×30' screens with Dolby Atmos sound. It succeeded the previous "Titan XC" format, which featured a 35-foot screen with Dolby 7.1 surround sound and XpanD 3D.

In an homage to the culture of Hawaiʻi, the chain's pre-film intro sequence features a recording of a hula kahiko performance. In December 2017, coinciding with the premiere of Star Wars: The Last Jedi, Consolidated introduced a digitally remastered version of the sequence to commemorate the company's centennial anniversary.
