= Avalon Theatre, Hobart =

Historic former theatre in Hobart, Tasmania

Avalon Theatre
- Temperance Hall, Bijou Theatre
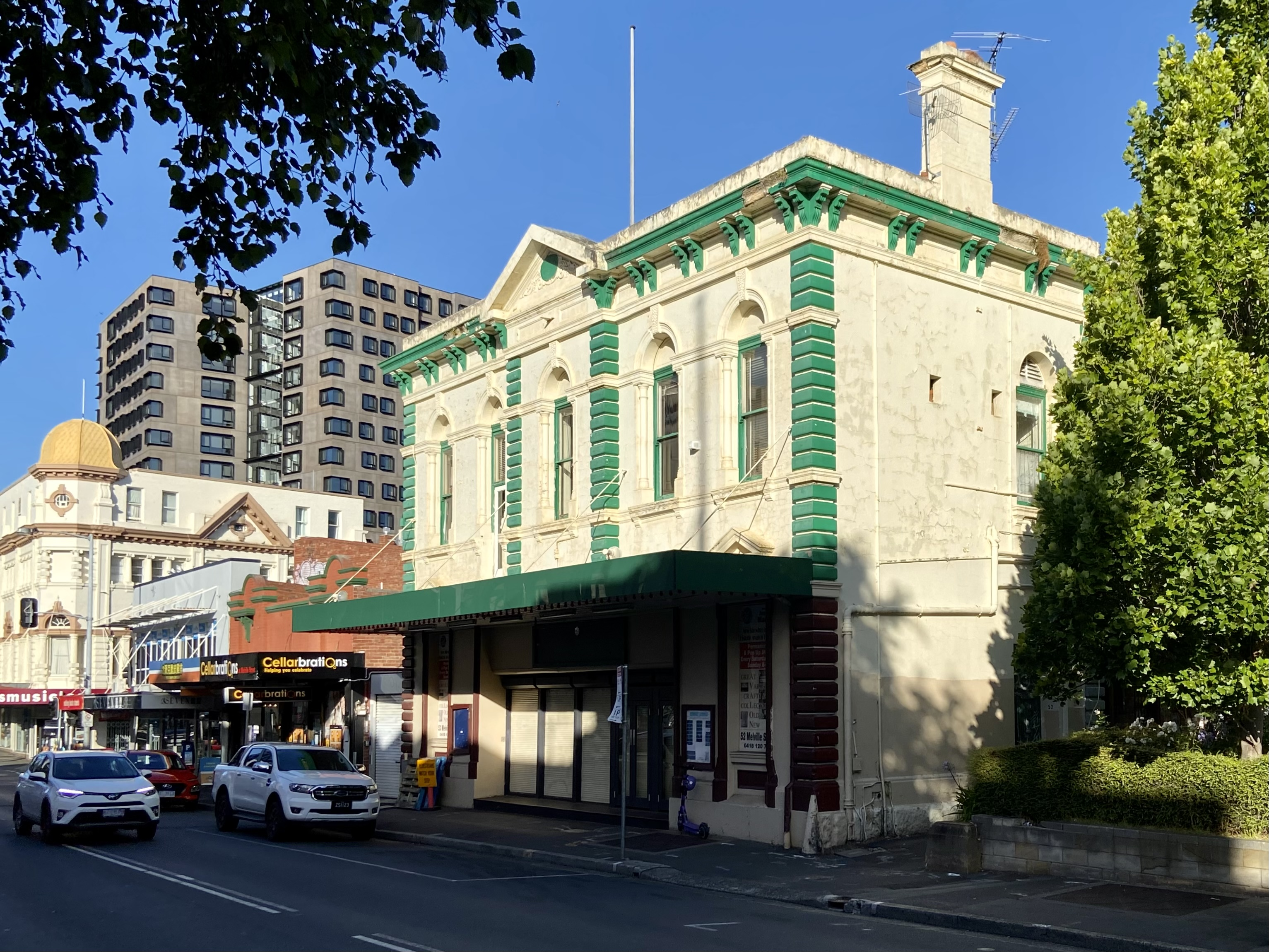
- Avalon Theatre in 2023
- Interactive map of Avalon Theatre
- Address: 52 – 54 Melville Street; Hobart, Tasmania; Australia
- Coordinates: 42°52′50.06″S 147°19′27.97″E
- Owner: Hillsong Church
- Capacity: 700 (1890), 936 (1937), 927 (1951), 756 (1966)

Construction
- Opened: May 1, 1890; 136 years ago
- Closed: November 1976; 49 years ago
- Years active: 1890–1976
- Architect: R. Flack Richards

Tasmanian Heritage Register
- Place Id: 11,054
- Status: Permanently Registered

The Avalon Theatre is a historic former Temperance Hall, theatre and cinema in Hobart, Tasmania, Australia.

== History ==
A ceremony for the foundation stone of a Temperance Hall was held on 21 March 1889 by the Tasmanian Temperance Alliance, which included members of the Society of Friends. Opening 1 May 1890, the Temperance Hall was used for religious gatherings, tea drinking, live entertainment and family-focused activities. Notably, the Temperance Hall was used for meetings surrounding Women's suffrage in Australia and visited by Jessie Ackermann of the Woman's Christian Temperance Union, who spoke at the hall in 1892. As influence of the Temperance movement in Australia waned following The Great War, the venue was increasingly used for dances, skating and as a cinema projecting silent films. The hall was eventually sold in 1922.

Over the following decade, the venue operated as the Bijou Theatre showcasing pantomimes, boxing, travelling theatre productions and live music. Although the theatre was popular, the operators were allured by the larger profit margins found in cinema exhibition. Established by the Avalon Theatre Co Ltd, the independent theatre was remodelled and reopened as Hobart’s first talkie theatre, the Avalon Theatre on 11 March 1932. The venue changed operators to Tasmanian Amusements Pty Ltd in 1934. A Western Electric Mirrophonic sound system was installed at the cinema in 1937.

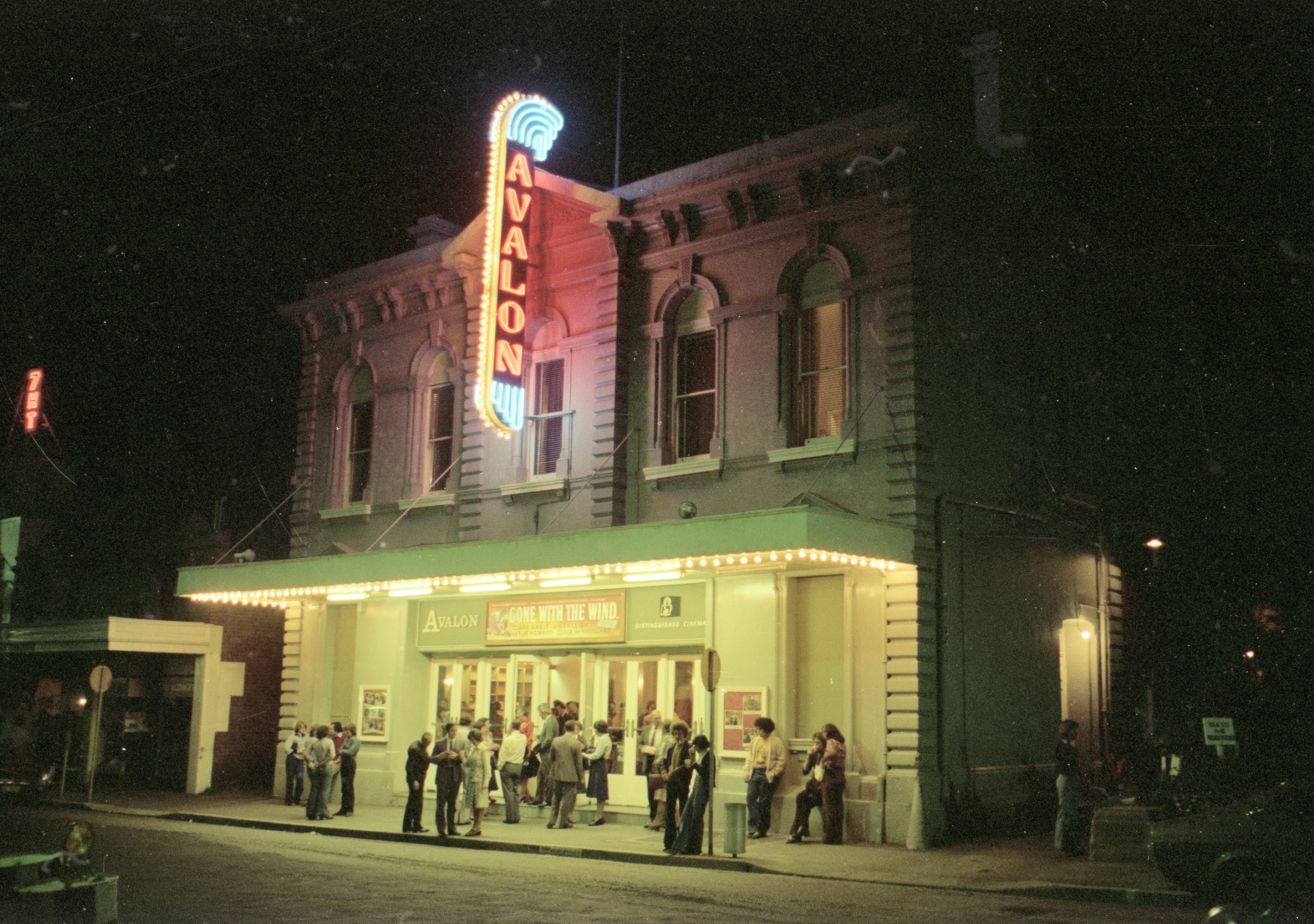
Avalon Theatre circa 1975

Commencing with My Fair Lady, it became the city's only 70mm theatre in 1966. The Avalon was taken over by Village Cinemas in July 1969 and closed in November 1976, coinciding with the opening of their new West End Twin theatre on Collins Street. The Avalon operated as a theatre for over 86 years, then as a Danny Burke electrical appliance store for over 30 years, closing in 2009.

=== Brunacci Avalon Market ===
Opening in February 2013, an indoor market called the Brunacci Avalon Market was held at the premises each Saturday and Sunday. The market permanently closed in September 2017.

=== Avalon Futurium ===
Throughout the mid-2010s, a large room recording studio called the Avalon Futurium operated within the old theatre. Alistair “Al Future” Campbell was the producer and engineer behind the Avalon Futurium.

== Contemporary use ==
The Avalon Theatre featured in Open House Hobart programming in 2018. The same year, the venue was used for concerts by House of Vnholy, Chrysta Bell and Rebekah Del Rio as part of Dark Mofo celebrations.

Hillsong Church purchased the heritage-listed theatre for $2.55 million in 2020. The theatre underwent renovations commencing in 2022.

== See also ==
- List of theatres in Hobart
