= Chatswood Mall =

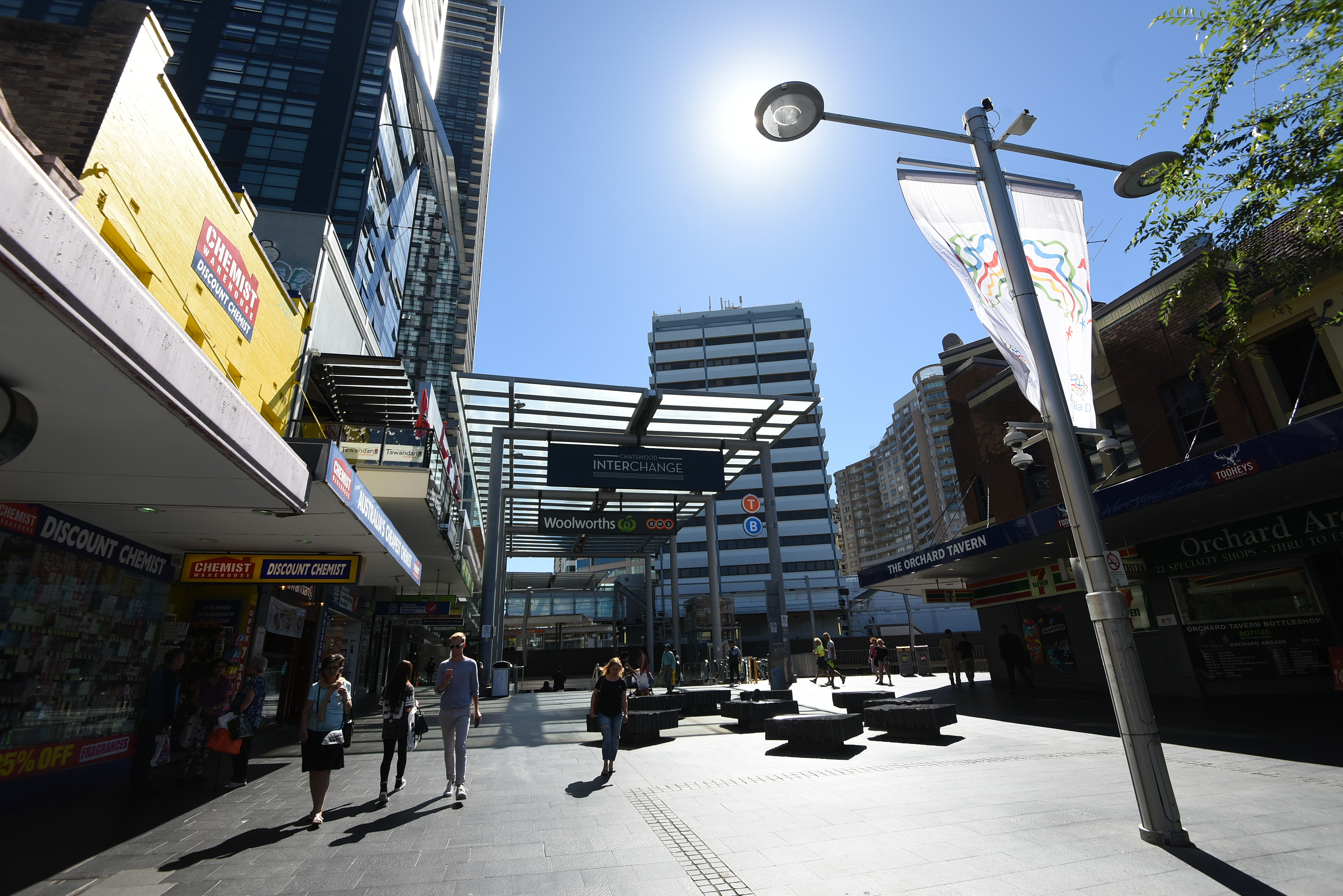
- Chatswood Mall looking towards Chatswood Interchange
- Coordinates: 33°47′47″S 151°10′57″E
- Address: Victoria Avenue, Chatswood
- Opened: 1982

Chatswood Mall (also known as Victoria Avenue Mall) is a pedestrian mall on Victoria Avenue in the suburb of Chatswood on Sydney's Lower North Shore in New South Wales, Australia. It connects the Chatswood Interchange to the Chatswood shopping district and The Concourse.

== History ==
Retail development in Chatswood started in 1959 on the eastern side of the railway station with the opening of Waltons and Grace Bros. The opening of Wallace Way, Lemon Grove and later Chatswood Chase (1983) and Westfield Chatswood (1986) heralded a new era of shopping centres east of the railway line. The section between Victor and Anderson Street was converted into a partial mall in late 1982. In 1989 section between Anderson Street and The Interchange became a full pedestrian mall. Parking was to be provided on the perimeter of the business centre (with the ultimate phasing out of motor vehicles in the CBD over a five-year period).

== Redevelopment ==
In 2010, Willoughby City Council lodged a $4.1 million upgrade of Chatswood Mall. Vibrant lighting, sculptural elements, tree plantings and fresh new street furniture palettes have been installed in Chatswood Mall. The upgrade was completed in 2011.

== Shopping centres ==
Five shopping centres and arcades are located on or close to Chatswood Mall:

- Westfield Chatswood - Opened in 1986 and is home to 282 stores
- Chatswood Chase - Opened in 1983 and is home to 209 stores
- Lemon Grove - One of the oldest shopping centre in Chatswood which opened in 1981 and connects to the former Wallace Way site
- The Gallery - An arcade with three levels of shops
- Victoria Plaza - A small shopping centre located near Chatswood Mall
- Orchard Arcade - An arcade located below the Orchard Tavern and has 22 speciality stores

== Events ==
The Melody Markets are held each Thursday and Friday in Chatswood Mall and feature food and craft stalls and live music visited by more than 30,000 people daily.

== Gallery ==
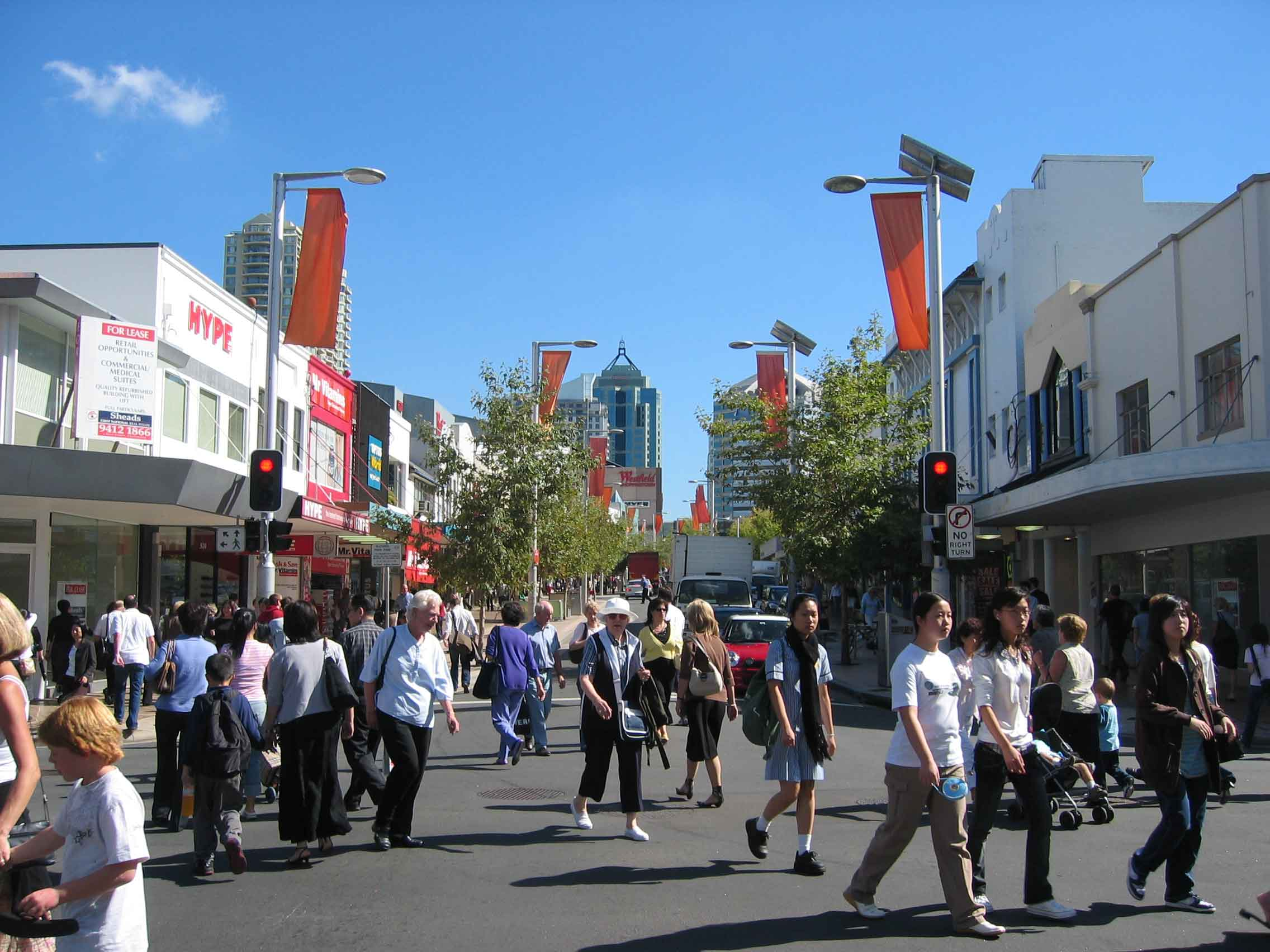
Victoria Avenue heading towards Chatswood Mall

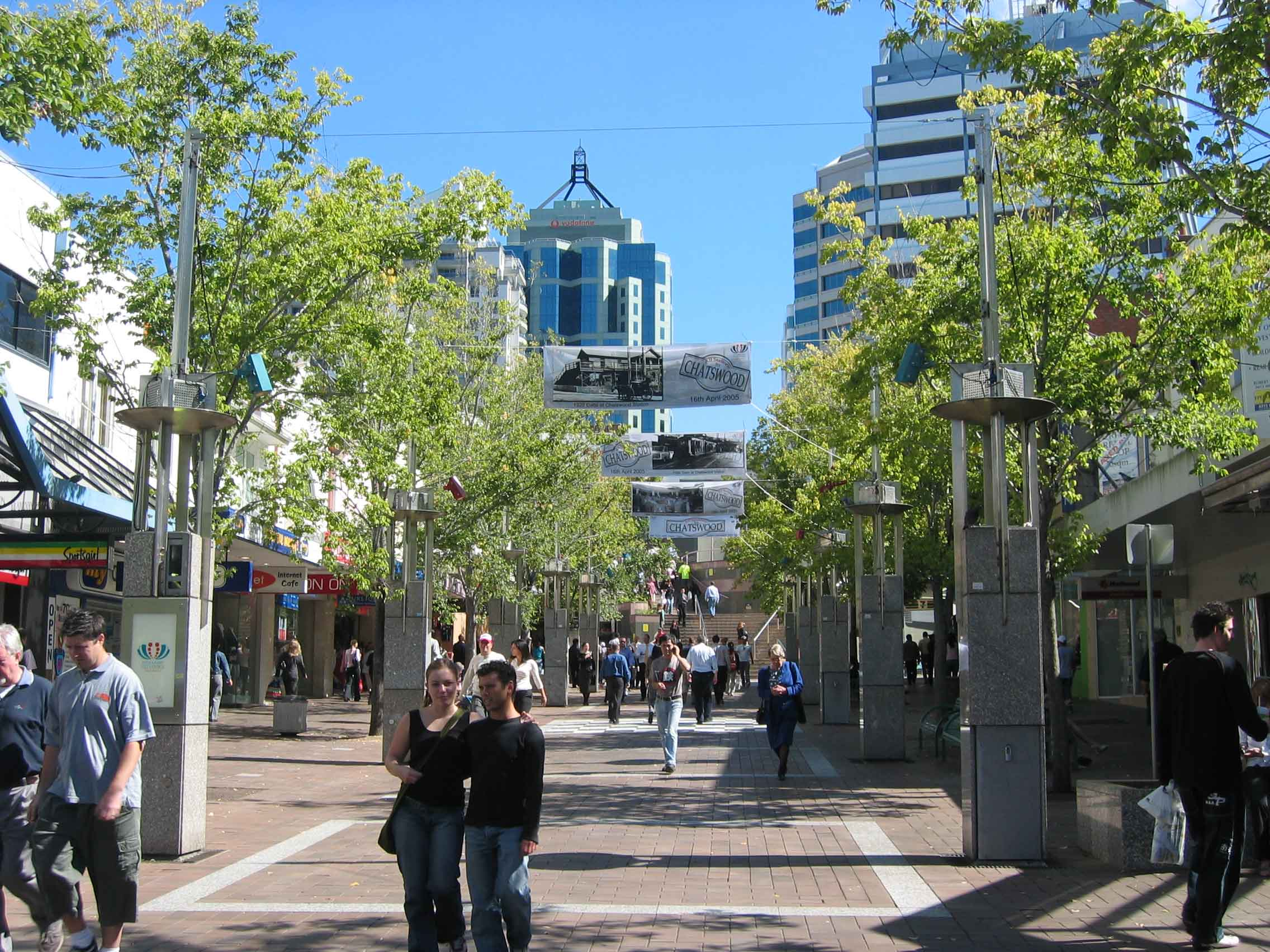
Chatswood Mall prior to 2011 redevelopment

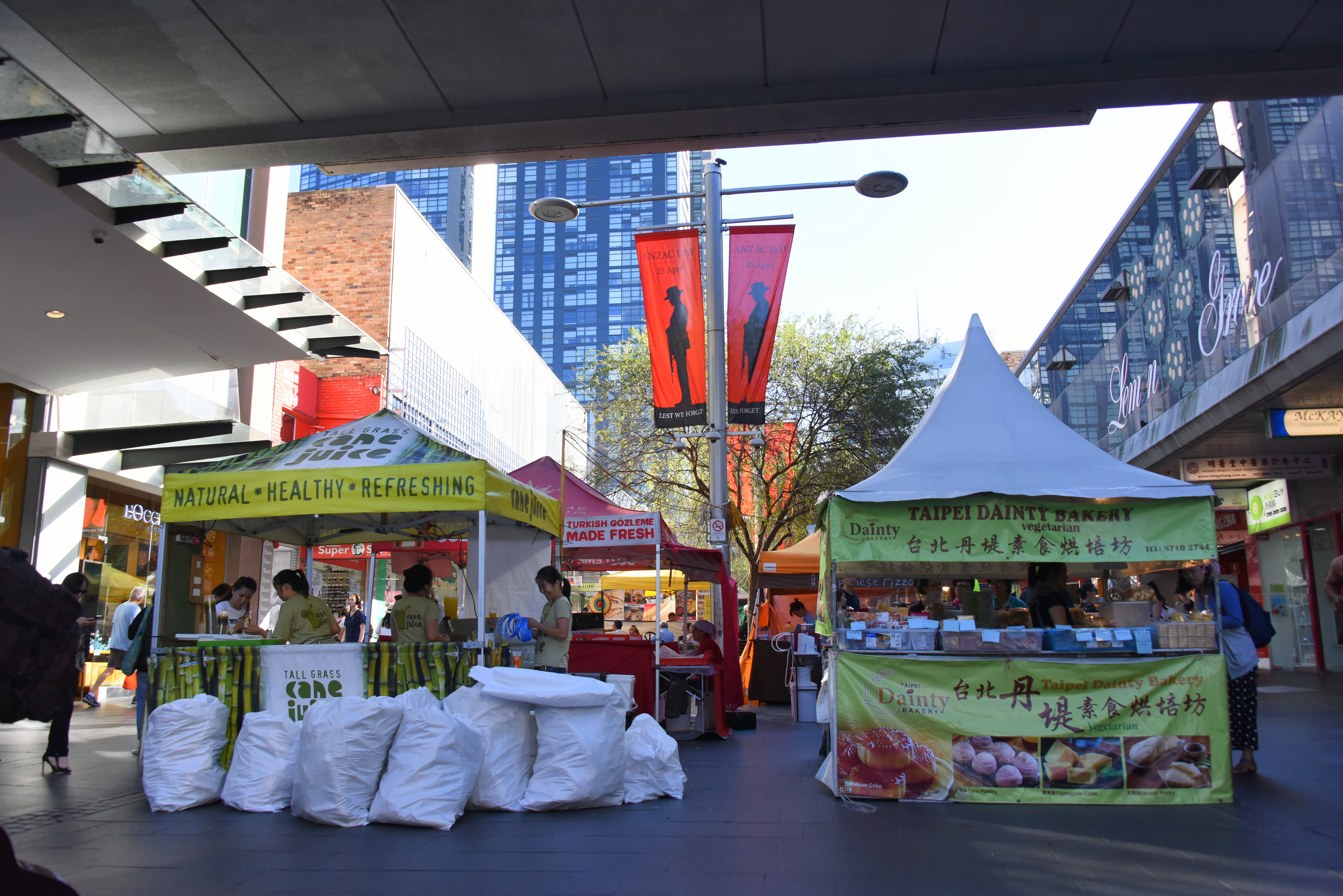
Melody Markets in Chatswood Mall

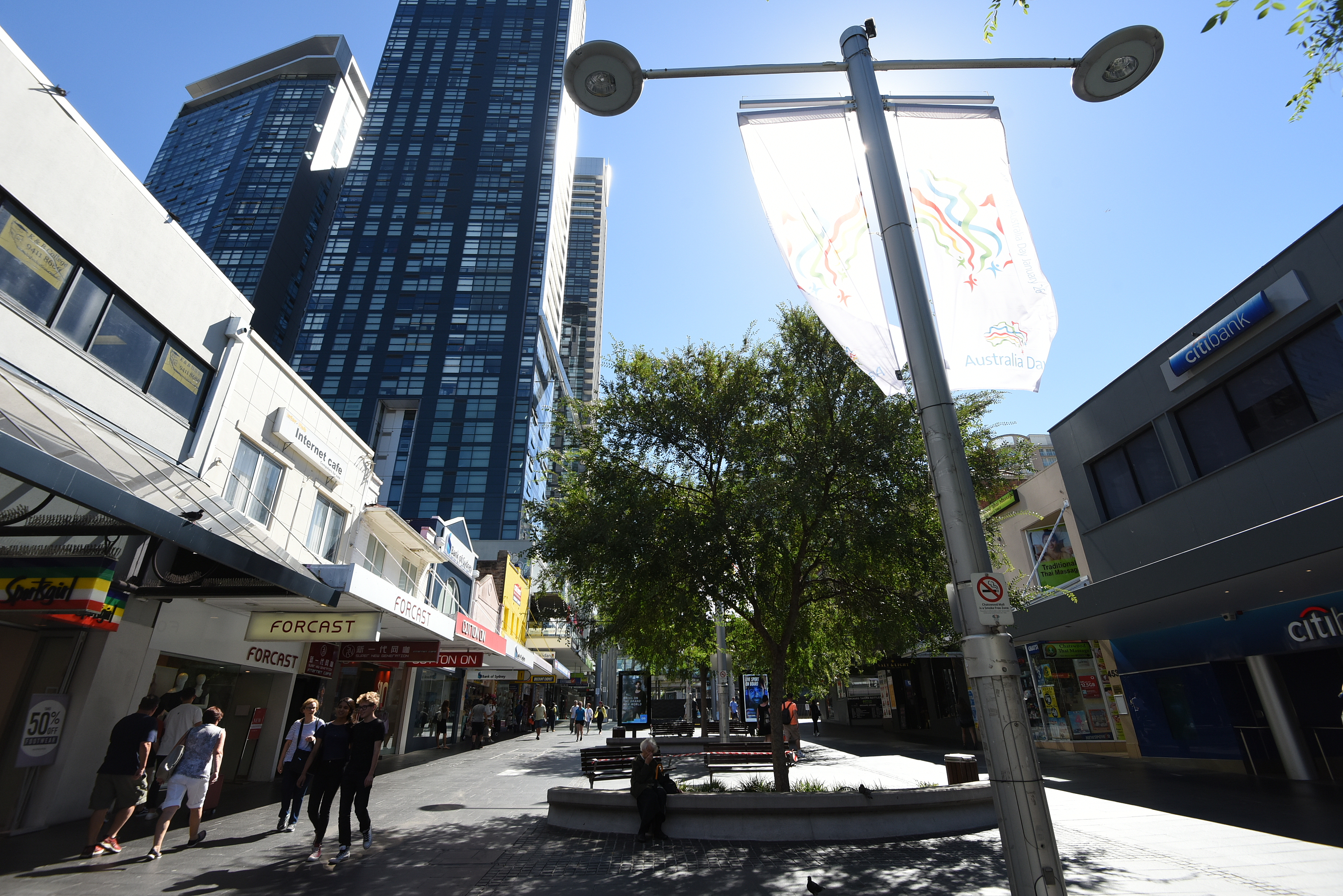
Chatswood Mall in 2018
