= Westfield Chatswood =

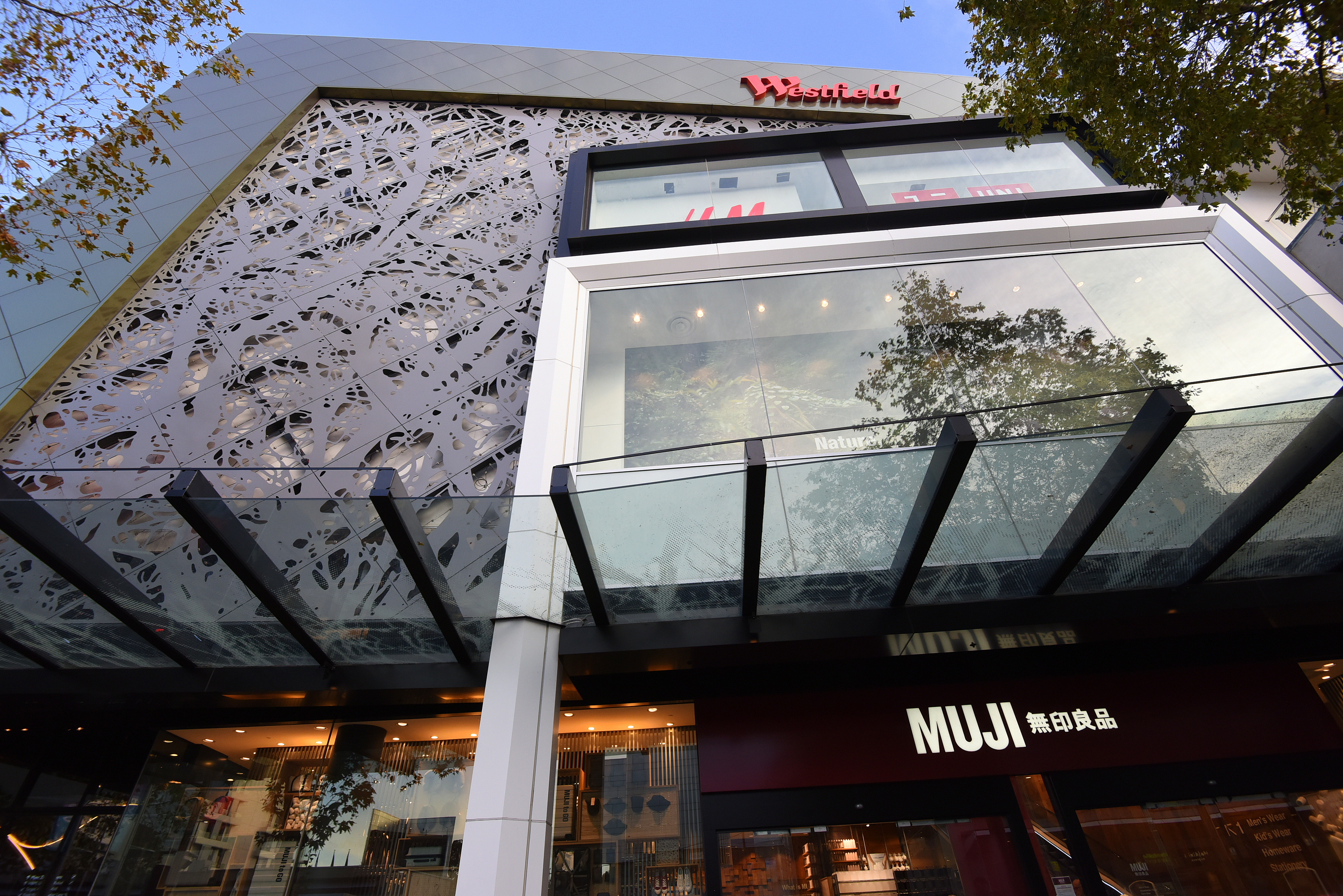
- Westfield Chatswood from Victoria Avenue
- Location: Chatswood, New South Wales, Australia
- Coordinates: 33°47′49″S 151°11′03″E
- Address: 1 Anderson St, Chatswood NSW 2067
- Opened: 30 January 1986; 40 years ago
- Developer: Westfield Group
- Manager: Scentre Group
- Owner: Scentre Group
- Num. of stores: 243
- Num. of anchor tenants: 5
- Floor area: 81,580 m^{2} (878,120 sq ft)
- Floors: 7
- Parking: 2,855 spaces
- Public transit: Chatswood; Victoria Avenue
- Website: westfield.com.au/chatswood

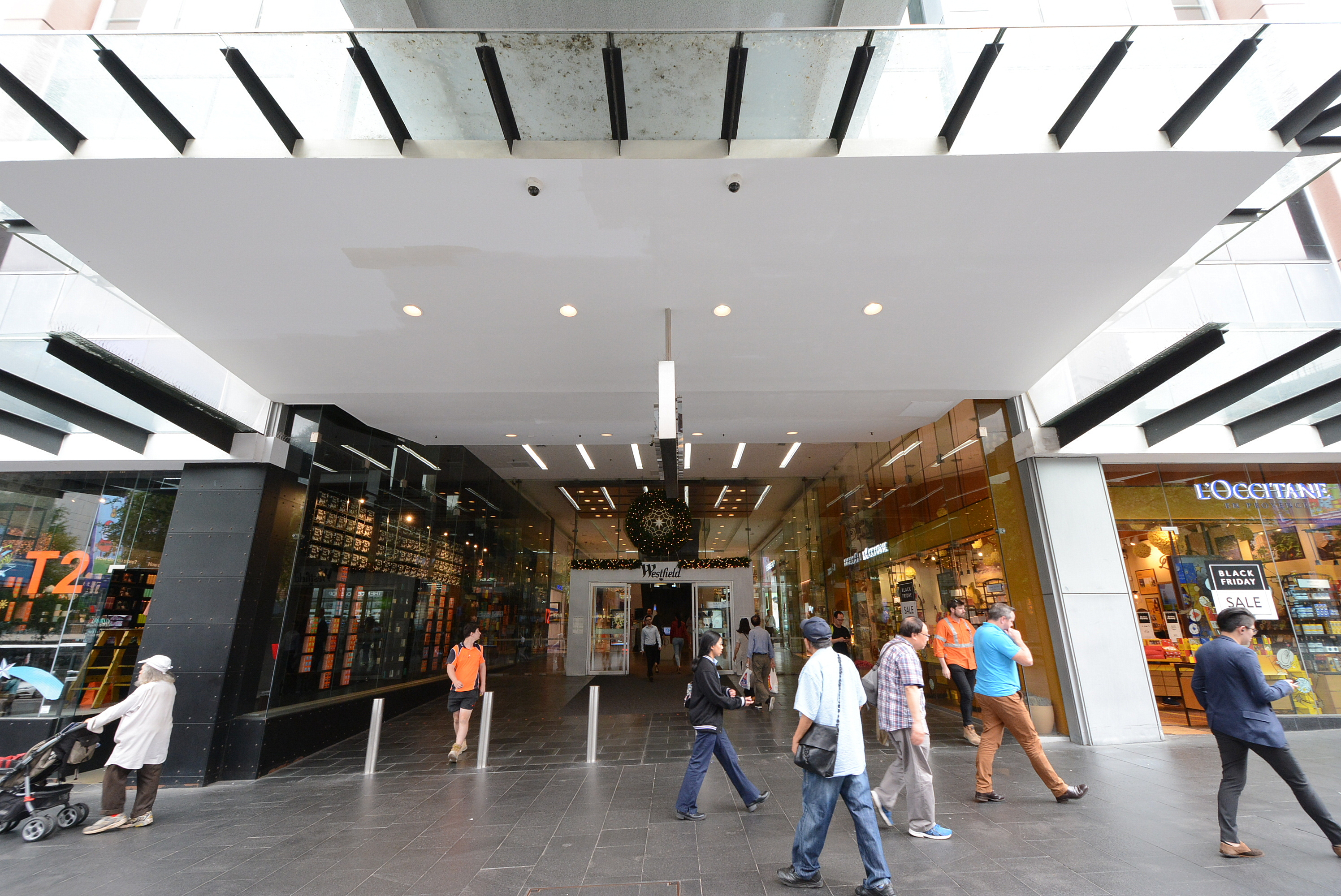
Entrance to Westfield Chatswood from Chatswood Mall

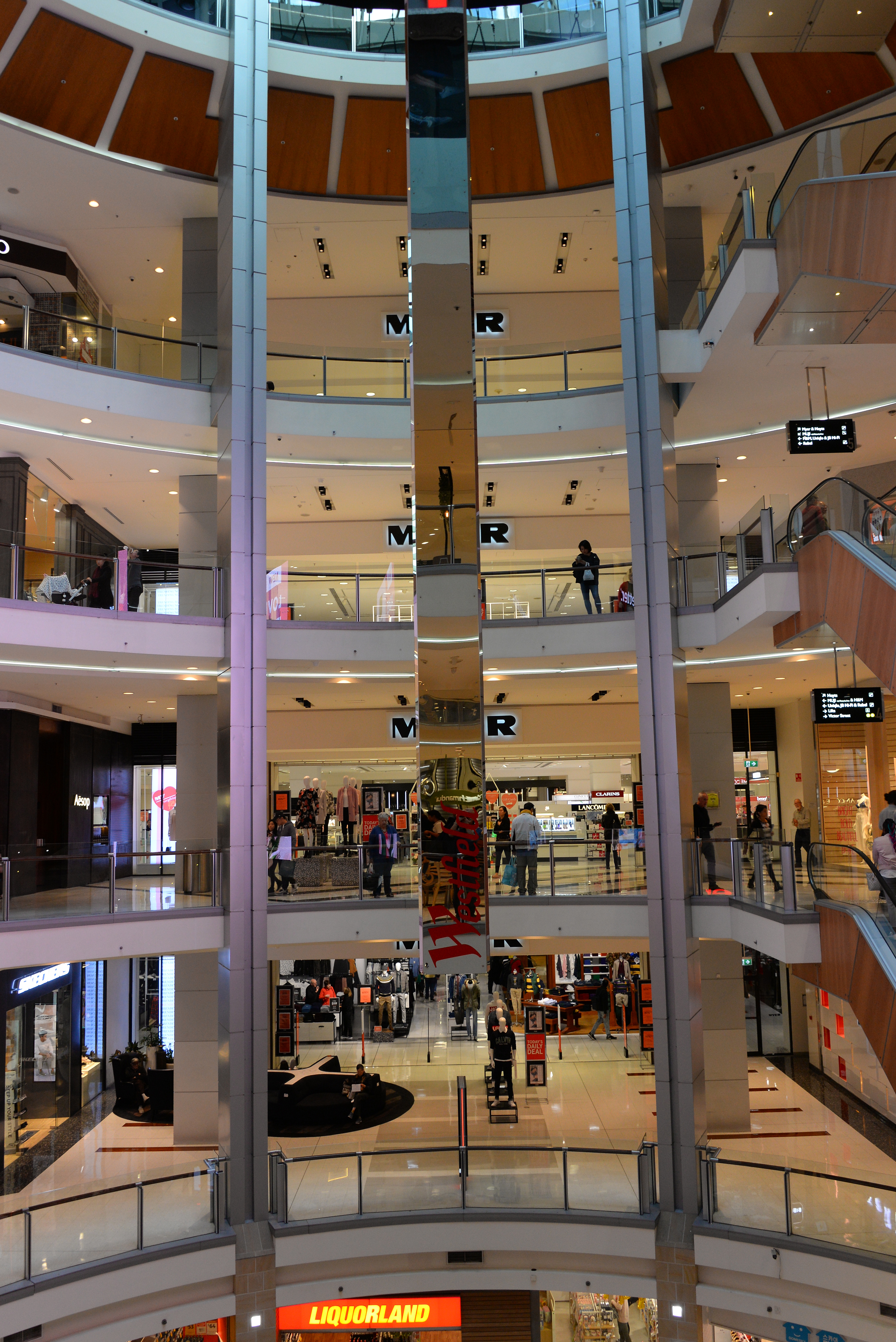
View of Myer at Westfield Chatswood

Westfield Chatswood is a large indoor shopping centre in the suburb of Chatswood in the Lower North Shore of Sydney.

== Transport ==
The Metro North West & Bankstown and North Shore railway lines offer frequent services to Chatswood station which is a short walk from the centre.

Westfield Chatswood has bus connections operated by Busways, CDC NSW and Keolis Northern Beaches services to the Sydney CBD, North Shore and Northern Sydney, as well as surrounding suburbs with bus stops on Victoria Avenue.

Westfield Chatswood also has a multi-level car park with 2,855 spaces.

== History ==
=== 20th Century ===
==== 1980s: opening ====
Westfield Shoppingtown Chatswood opened on 10 November 1987 and is the second major shopping centre to be built in Chatswood with the first being Chatswood Chase which opened in 1983 and Wallace Way and Lemon Grove in the 1980s. The $100 million centre was the 27th shopping town the Westfield Holdings Ltd has developed.

Westfield Shoppingtown Chatswood was located next to the free standing Grace Bros store which opened in 1961 and featured Target (which was originally located at Wallace Way until 1986), Coles New World, Franklins supermarket and 120 speciality stores.

==== 1990s: redevelopment ====
In early 1994 Rebel Sport opened its "Superstore" on level 5 opposite Toys "R" Us.

In February 1996 Westfield Trust purchased a half share in the Grace Bros development site from Coles Myer for $42.5 million with plans to incorporate it into a future redevelopment.

On 30 August 1996 $154 million redevelopment proposal from Westfield Trust to redevelop of part of the Grace Bros site and incorporate it into the existing centre was approved by Willoughby City Council. The new Grace Bros would be built into a new four-level department store on the former car park behind the existing store on Victoria Avenue. The redevelopment would add in a new entertainment, leisure and lifestyle concept known as 'The Street' which would feature an eight-screen cinema complex. Once the redevelopment is completed,127 speciality stores would be added together with the existing Target, Franklins, Rebel Sport, Toys "R" Us and 150 speciality stores alongside the Grace Bros department store. This would bring the total number of stores to 285 and the total floor area to 75,000m².

Work began on the $205 million redevelopment in February 1997. The first stage of the redevelopment was opened in November 1999 with the opening of the four-level Grace Bros department store, Coles supermarket on level 2, The Street precinct and 127 speciality stores.

=== 21st Century ===
==== 2000s ====
The final works of the $205 million redevelopment were completed in 2000 with the opening of restaurants on level 6 and outside on level 3 in March. The six-screen Hoyts cinema complex on level 7 opened in May 2000. The opening of Hoyts inside Westfield did not impact the trade of the nearby existing Hoyts cinema inside Mandarin Centre.

In June 2001 the Franklins supermarket chain was offered for sale. The Westfield Shoppingtown Chatswood store was one of the 67 stores that were acquired by Woolworths. As a result of the sale, Woolworths closed that Franklins store and due to its small size, it was rebranded as Food For Less.

In late 2005, JB Hi-Fi opened its store on level 5 next to Toys "R" Us.

In May 2008, Aldi opened its store on the space vacated by Food For Less.

==== 2010s ====
Spanish clothing retailer Zara opened its two-level 1300m² store on level 4 and 5 on 13 February 2014.

On 30 June 2014, Westfield Group was restructured into two new independent companies known as Scentre Group and Westfield Corporation. Scentre Group manages and owns the company's interests in Australia and New Zealand. As a result of the restructure Scentre Group has taken over the interest of Westfield Chatswood from the Westfield Group.

In January 2015, up to nine stores were closed and relocated in preparation for the $110 million redevelopment of Westfield Chatswood. Rebel closed its store on level 5 on 13 January and reopened in its temporary location on level 6 on 15 January. On 5 February 2015, Toys "R" Us had reached the end of their lease and permanently closed.

The redevelopment of Westfield Chatswood known as "Chatswood's New Global Playground" commenced on 24 February 2015. This development increased the floor area from 77,000m² to 80,000m² and involved the reconfiguration of the two-level mall facing Victoria Ave into a five-level statement entrance that would house a two-level flagship Topshop/Topman store with a store entrance on Victoria Avenue, new specialty stores on level 3 and an Asian inspired dining market on level 2. The Asian inspired dining market has been modelled on a marketplace concept and trade beyond normal centre hours. It would link to an outdoor laneway for street food pop ups and other events against the backdrop of the new urban street art. Around 40 new stores including food stores, kiosks and a mix of international and Australian fashion retailers.

On 26 November 2015, the $125 million redevelopment of Westfield Chatswood was unveiled. It included the opening of 15 specialty stores, the two-level flagship Topshop and Topman store and the Hawker Lane dining precinct. The Hawker Lane dining precinct is inspired by street food markets of South-East Asia and features 14 street-food style operators. Hawker Lane connects to Charlotte Lane which had been transformed into a pedestrian precinct with murals created from recognised Australian artists such as Anthony Lister, Beastman and Nanami Cowdroy.

The second phase of the $125 million redevelopment of Westfield Chatswood was opened on 18 February 2016 with the opening of an upgraded fashion precinct on level 5 and 6 with the opening of H&M, Uniqlo and a new relocated Rebel. H&M opened its 2700m² two-level store on what were previously three food court tenancies on level 4 and on the former Toys "R" Us space on level 5. Uniqlo opened its fifth NSW store on level 5 partially on the former two-level mall facing Victoria Ave. Rebel opened its new “stadium of sport” concept store on level 6. The opening of the store was attended by a number of sporting and TV celebrities including Jarryd Hayne, Erin Molan, Kyly Clarke, Jessica Fox, Anthony Watmough, Liam Reddy, Josh Reynolds and Martin Taupau.

In August 2016, Ardent Leisure submitted plans to Willoughby Council and the NSW Planning Department to open an “amusement centre” such as AMF Bowling alley and laser skirmish or a PLAYTIME arcade at Westfield Chatswood. PLAYTIME arcade opened on level 6 on 24 May 2017.

In July 2017, Topshop and Topman closed their stores as part of a bid to save its Australian operation. Cotton On opened its Mega store on the former Topman space on level 4 on 30 November 2017. Muji opened its store on the former Topshop space on level 3 fronting Victoria Avenue on 21 March 2018.

In May 2018, the level 4 food court were reduced to just six outlets and five kiosks. The six food court tenancies (including McDonald's and Oporto) and the seating area located between H&M and Tarocash were permanently closed and replaced with four fashion retail tenancies. The level 4 amenities next to the food court were also upgraded.

In November 2018, The Entertainment and Education Group (TEEG) announced that all PLAYTIME venues would slowly be rebranded to Timezone. On 29 June 2019, the PLAYTIME venue on level 6 was refurbished and reopened as Timezone.

==== 2020s ====
Due to the outbreak of COVID-19 pandemic Westfield Chatswood remained open to retailers offering essential services only. Many retailers introduced click-and-collect services. The Hoyts cinema, Timezone and many non-essential retailers were shut during the lockdown. The food court, cafes and restaurants remained open to delivery and takeaway only with the seating area for customers closed off. Hand sanitiser stations, signage and social distancing measures were introduced.

On 11 November 2020, the Coles supermarket was refurbished and relaunched as Coles Local. The supermarket features ecostore refill station, pet treat bar, a premium coffee and orange juice station, and a macaron, mini gelato and a Japanese mochi ice cream parlour.

In January 2021, H&M closed its store due to the economic effects from the COVID-19 pandemic. The level 4 space was replaced by JD Sports which opened on 11 October 2021. Rebel relocated from level 6 to the former H&M space on level 5 and opened its new experience rCX concept store on 12 October 2023.

On 2 May 2025, TK Maxx opened its store on the former Rebel space on level 6. This makes Chatswood the only suburb in Sydney to have two TK Maxx stores.

== Tenants ==
Westfield Chatswood has 81,093m^{2} of floor space. The major retailers include Myer, Target, Aldi, Coles Local, Cotton On, TK Maxx, Uniqlo, Zara, JB Hi-Fi, Rebel, Timezone and Hoyts Cinema.

== Incidents and accidents ==
- 24 September 2005, a 32-year-old woman fell from the sixth floor and straight onto a 42-year-old woman on the ground floor in an attempted suicide. Both women were taken to Royal North Shore Hospital and police are investigating.
- 12 January 2016, A man fell from the fifth level and died. About 3:45 pm police were called to the centre following reports a man was standing on the wrong side of a railing. Police believe it was suicide.

== See also ==
- List of shopping centres in Australia
