= Chatswood Interchange =

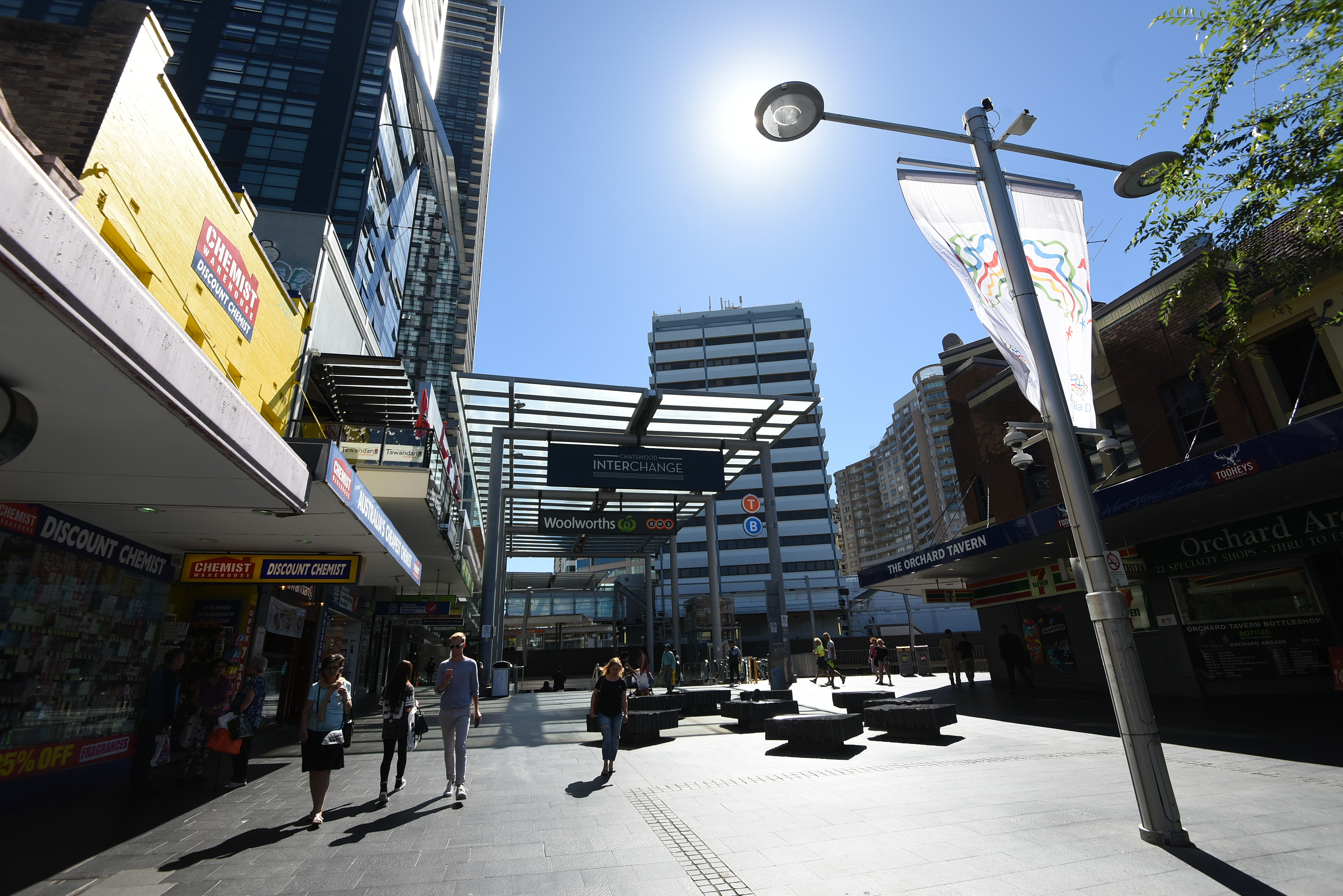
- View of Chatswood Interchange from Chatswood Mall
- Location: Chatswood, New South Wales, Australia
- Coordinates: 33°47′50″S 151°10′55″E
- Address: 436 Victoria Ave, Chatswood NSW 2067
- Opened: 1988; 38 years ago (original); 2014; 12 years ago (new)
- Owner: Galileo Group
- Num. of stores: 70
- Num. of anchor tenants: 1
- Floor area: 10,000 m^{2} (107,639 sq ft)
- Floors: 4
- Public transit: Chatswood
- Website: www.chatswoodinterchange.com

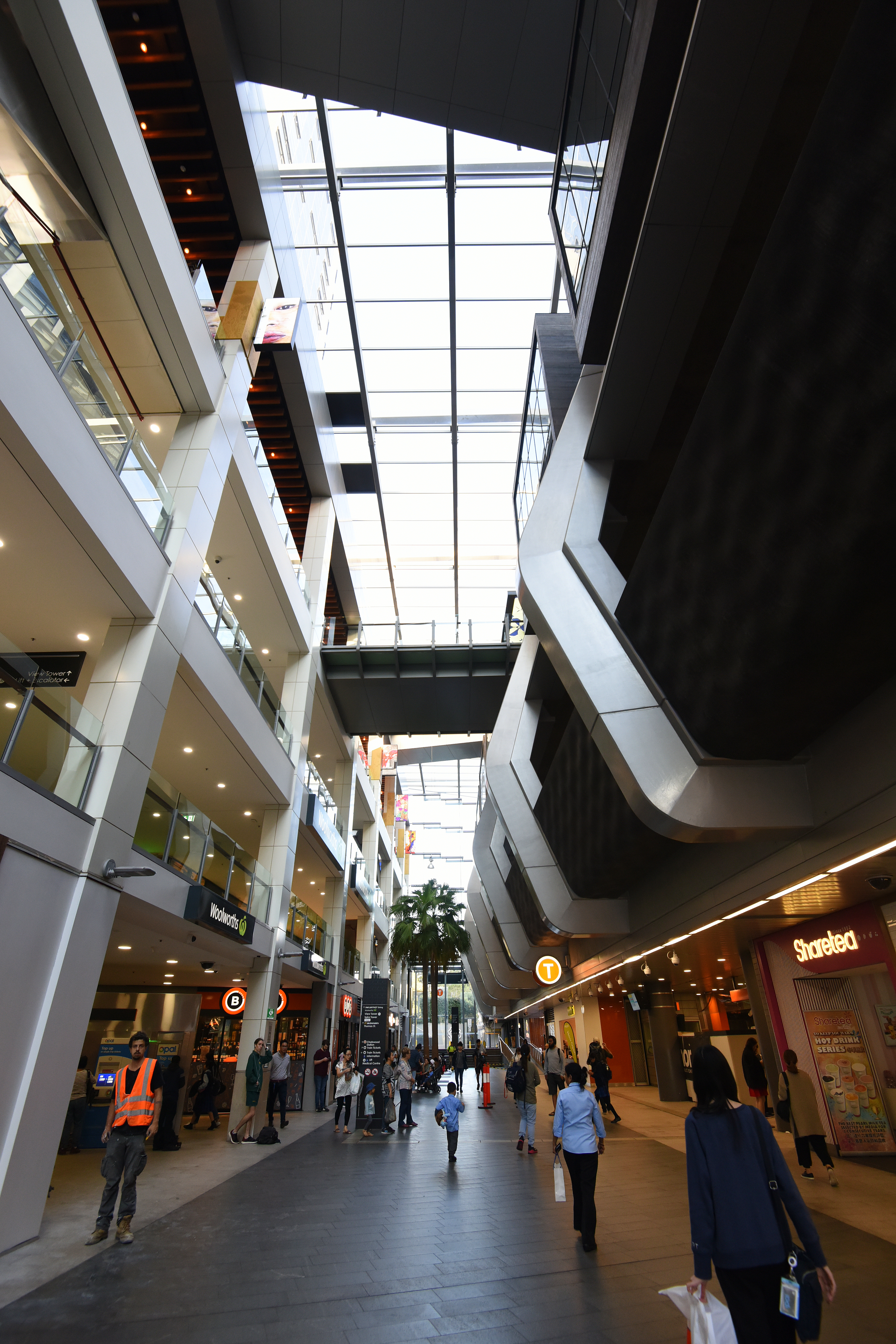
Interior of Chatswood Interchange

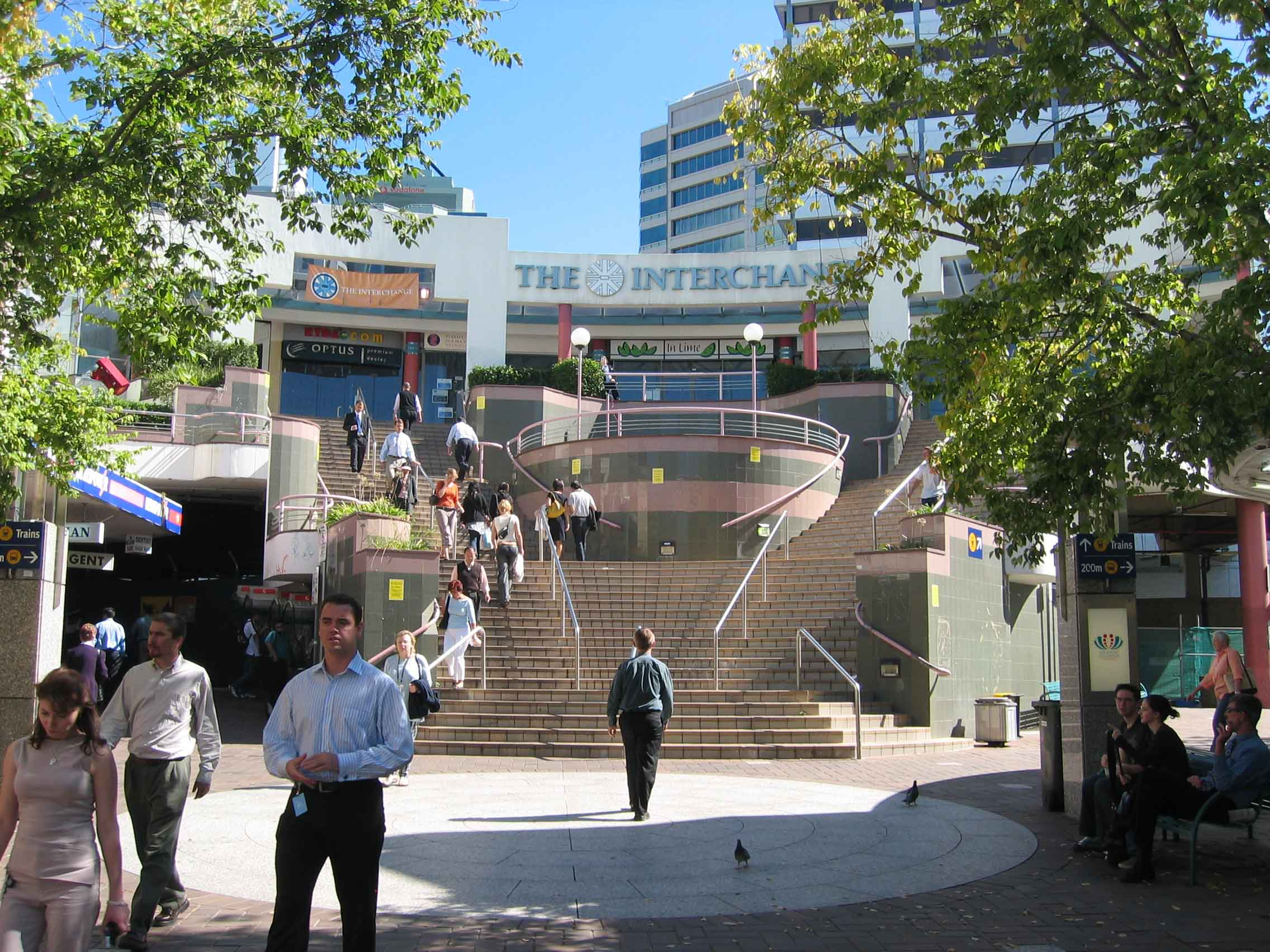
The Interchange in 2005 before it was demolished to make way for the Epping to Chatswood rail link

Chatswood Interchange (also known as The Interchange Chatswood or The Interchange) is a shopping centre in the suburb of Chatswood in the lower North Shore of Sydney. It is integrated with the Chatswood railway station and features a Woolworths Metro supermarket, 70 speciality stores, three high-rise office towers and high-rise apartments.

== Transport ==
The Metro North West & Bankstown and North Shore railway lines offer frequent services from Chatswood station.

Chatswood Interchange has bus connections to Sydney CBD, North Shore and Northern Sydney, as well as surrounding suburbs. It is served by Busways, CDC NSW, Transit Systems and Keolis Northern Beaches with bus stops on either side of the railway line.

There is also parking in nearby streets and car parks.

== History ==
The Interchange opened in 1988 integrated with the station entrance. It featured around 30 speciality stores with no anchor stores.

With the construction of the Epping to Chatswood railway line, The Interchange as well as Chatswood railway station and its attached bus interchange was demolished in 2005. Construction started on new railway station, bus interchange and shopping centre in late 2005. The CTI was constructed as a Public Private Partnership and was to include a new shopping centre called 'Metro Chatswood' and three towers. The private developers, CRI Chatswood, went into receivership whilst construction was underway. As a result, the shopping centre remained vacant until 2014 and major construction of the towers was delayed for several years.

The centre opened in 2014 as Chatswood Interchange. Woolworths opened its 2000sqm store and its BWS chain opened on the ground level. Many kiosks have opened in stages and the post office has relocated there.

On 28 March 2015, The District food court opened on the top level, which included 14 vendors that offered Chinese, Japanese, Thai and Italian cuisine.

As a result, Chatswood Interchange is expected to reach $634 million by 2026 and can support trade for over 75,150 people.
