= William Ford (prospector) =

Australian gold prospector (1852–1932)

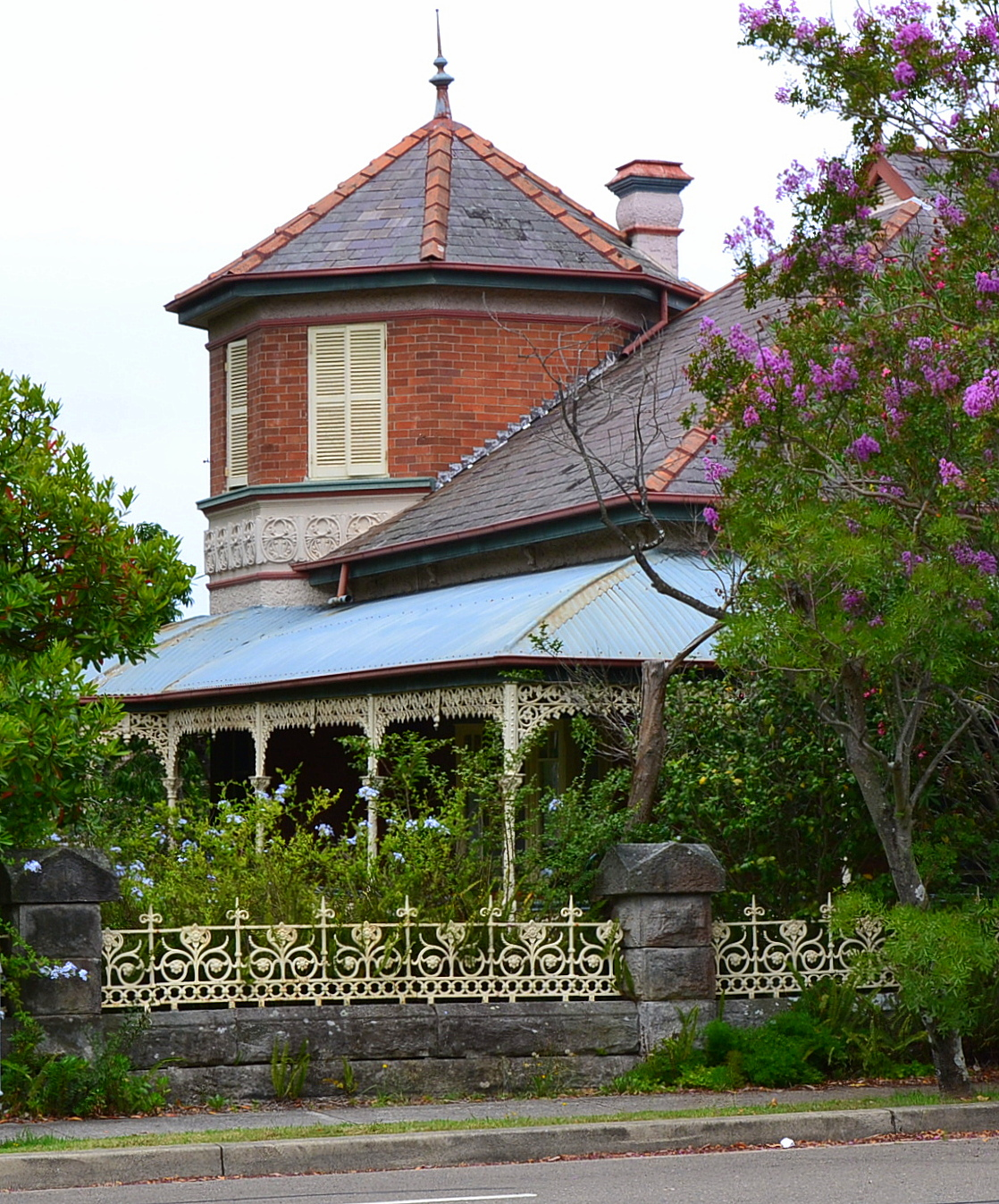
'Wyckliffe', Ford's house in Chatswood

William Ford (1852–1932), along with Arthur Wellesley Bayley, discovered gold on 17 September 1892, in the area that became the gold rush town of Coolgardie, Western Australia.

== Life and career ==
William Ford and Arthur Bayley teamed up when they met on the gold fields in what is now the Coolgardie area. After some initial disappointments, they succeeded in finding a major gold reef that became famous in the mining world. As a result, they are regarded as the discoverers of Coolgardie. Bayley, unlike Ford, had little chance to enjoy his new-found wealth, dying within four years of the discovery.

Circa 1903–4, Ford built a sandstone Federation house called 'Wyckliffe' in the Sydney suburb of Chatswood. Built predominantly of stone, the house is single-storeyed with a turret. It has elaborate wrought iron balconies as well as floral detailing around the turret. Ford and his wife had a baby girl in 1906; a son followed not long after. Ford lived quietly at 'Wyckliffe' until his death, which was reported in the Sydney Morning Herald; the paper described him as the discoverer of Coolgardie.

'Wyckliffe' is listed by Willoughby Council as a heritage item of local significance under Willoughby LEP 2012 (edocs.willoughby.nsw.gov.au/DocumentViewer.ashx?dsi=3539298).
