= Chatswood, New South Wales =

Chatswood
- Suburb
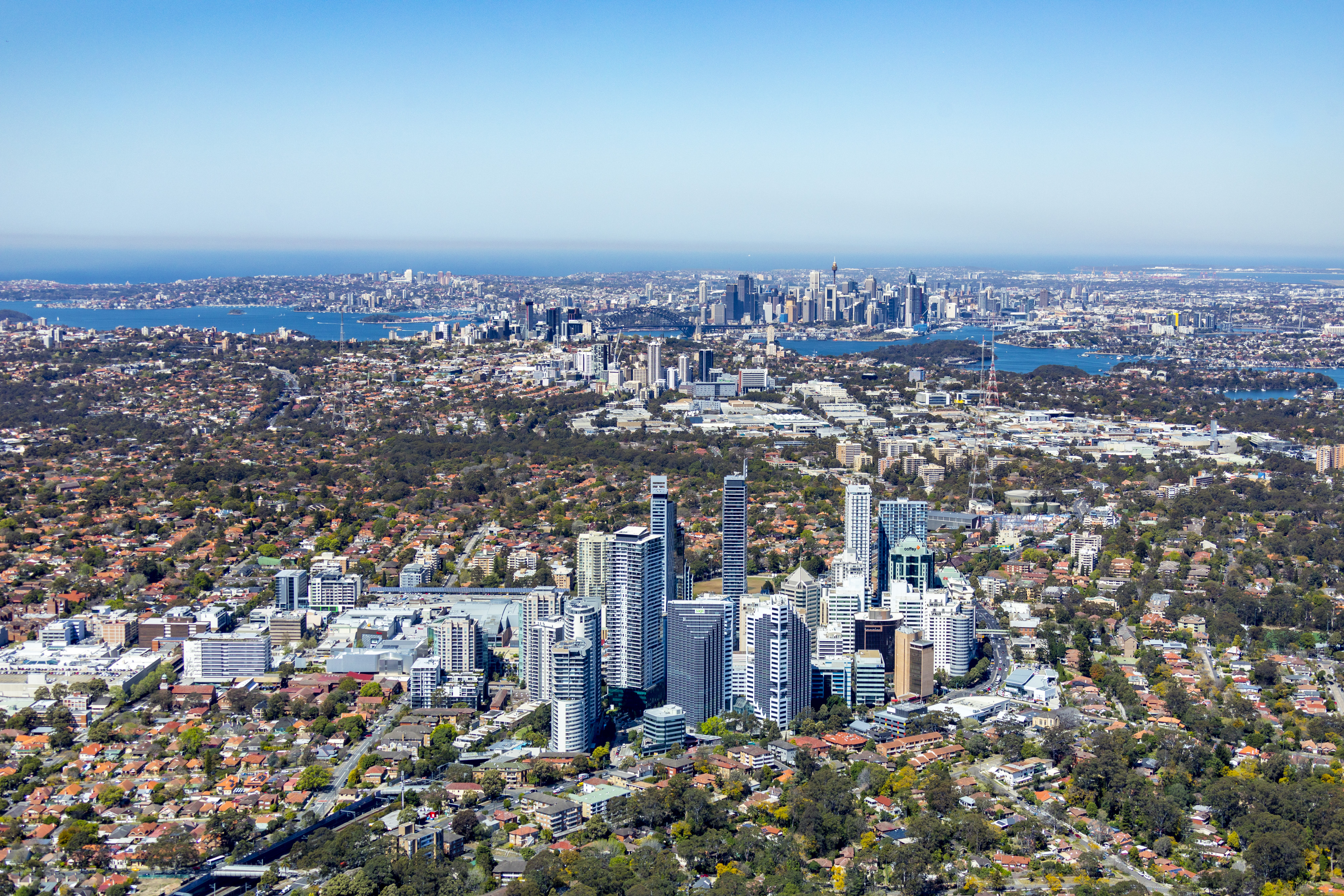
- An aerial image looking south over Chatswood, with St Leonards and the Sydney central business district in the distance.

- Interactive map of Chatswood
- Country: Australia
- State: New South Wales
- City: Sydney
- LGA: City of Willoughby
- Location: 10 km (6.2 mi) north of Sydney CBD
- Established: 1876

Government
  - State electorate: Willoughby
  - Federal divisions: Bennelong; Bradfield

Area
  - Total: 4.9 km^{2} (1.9 sq mi)
- Elevation: 114 m (374 ft)

Population
  - Total: 25,553 (2021 census)
  - Density: 5,210/km^{2} (13,510/sq mi)
- Postcode: 2067
Suburbs around Chatswood
Roseville	Castle Cove	Middle Cove
Chatswood West	Chatswood	North Willoughby
Lane Cove	Artarmon	Willoughby

Chatswood is a suburb and commercial centre in the Lower North Shore of Sydney, in the state of New South Wales, Australia, 10 kilometres north of the Sydney central business district. It is also the administrative seat of the local government area of the City of Willoughby.

== History ==
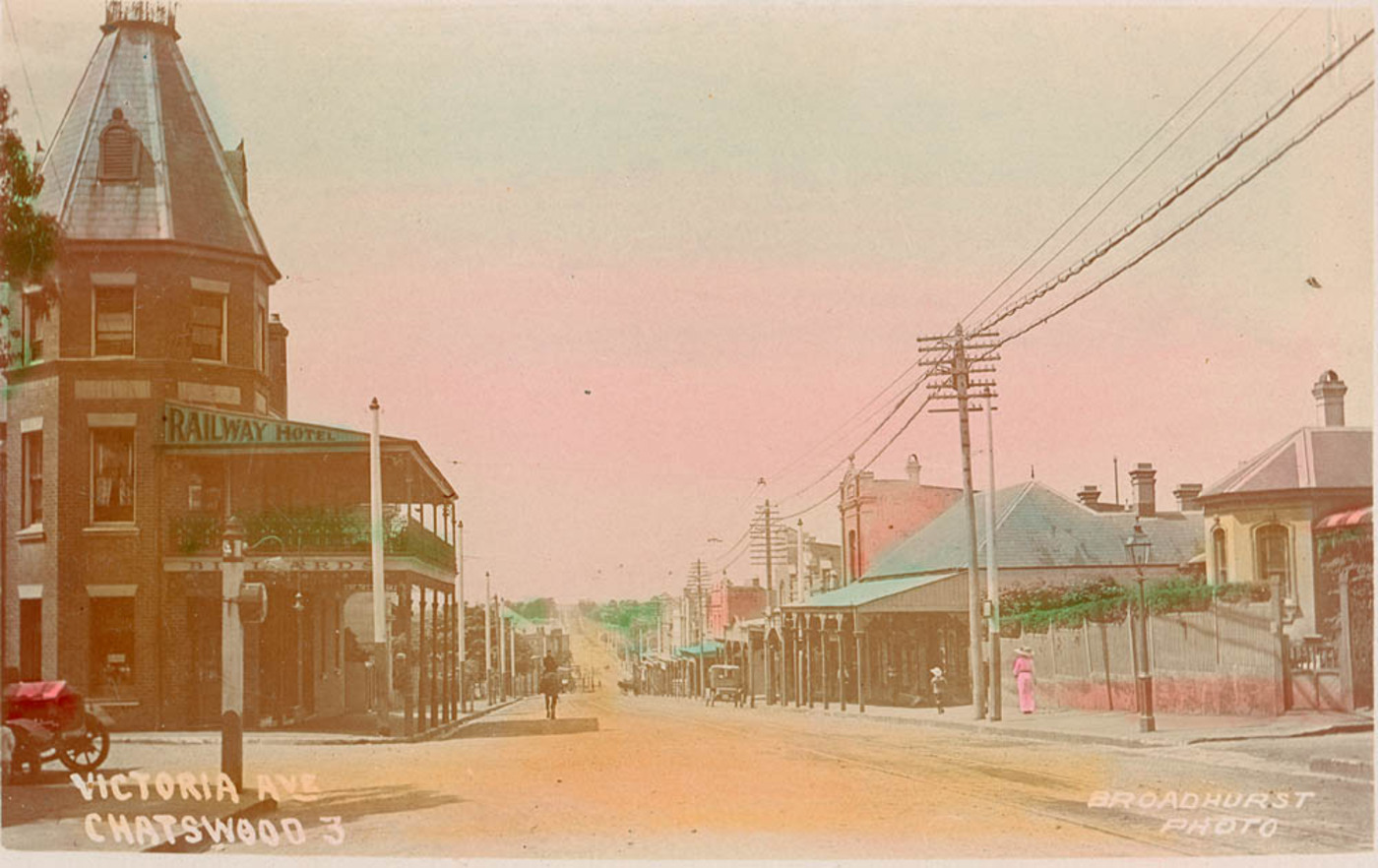
Victoria Avenue in 1900

Chatswood was named after Charlotte Harnett, wife of then Mayor of Willoughby and a pioneer of the district, Richard Harnett, and the original "wooded" nature of the area. The moniker derives from her nickname "Chattie" and was shortened from Chattie's Wood to Chatswood in the mid-1800s.

Residential settlement of Chatswood began in 1876 and grew with the opening of the North Shore railway line in 1890 and also increased with the opening of the Harbour Bridge in 1932.

Chatswood Post Office opened on 1 August 1879, closed in 1886 and reopened in 1887.

At this time, Chatswood's history contained orchards and dairy farms on the west side of the train station as well as factories, such as Dairy Farmers Inc and Three Threes Pickle Factory on what was then Gordon Road (now the Pacific Highway). Although now predominantly a commercial and residential area, Chatswood has an industrial past. Other factories included; Ferguson Transformers, after which Ferguson Lane is named, and the Caroma factory (formerly Marshman Brothers), now converted to residential units and a small garden park.

== Heritage listings ==
Chatswood has a number of heritage-listed sites, including:

- Windsor Gardens
- Hilton
- Seven Gables
- Wyckliffe (listed by Willoughby Council)
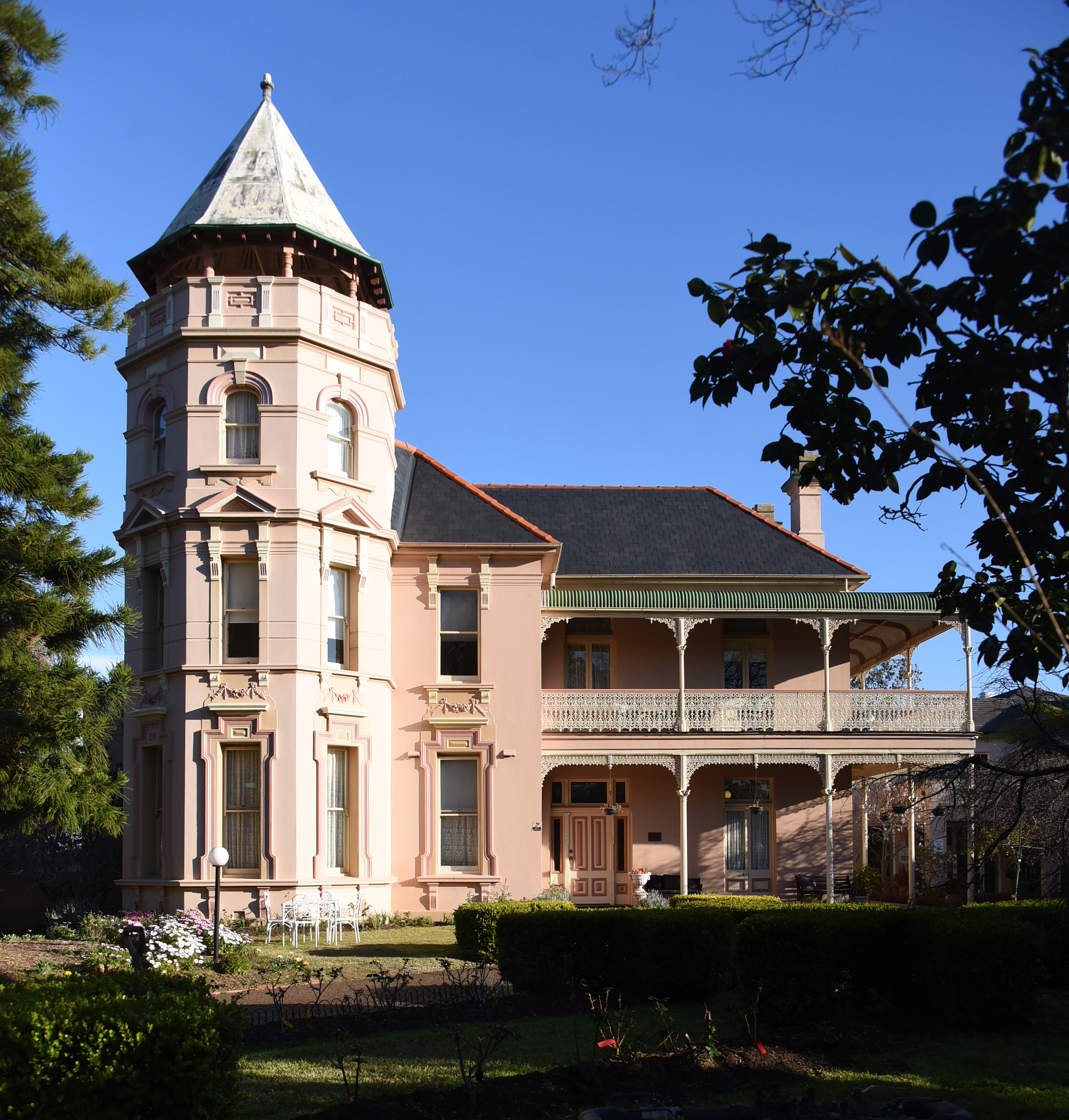
Windsor Gardens

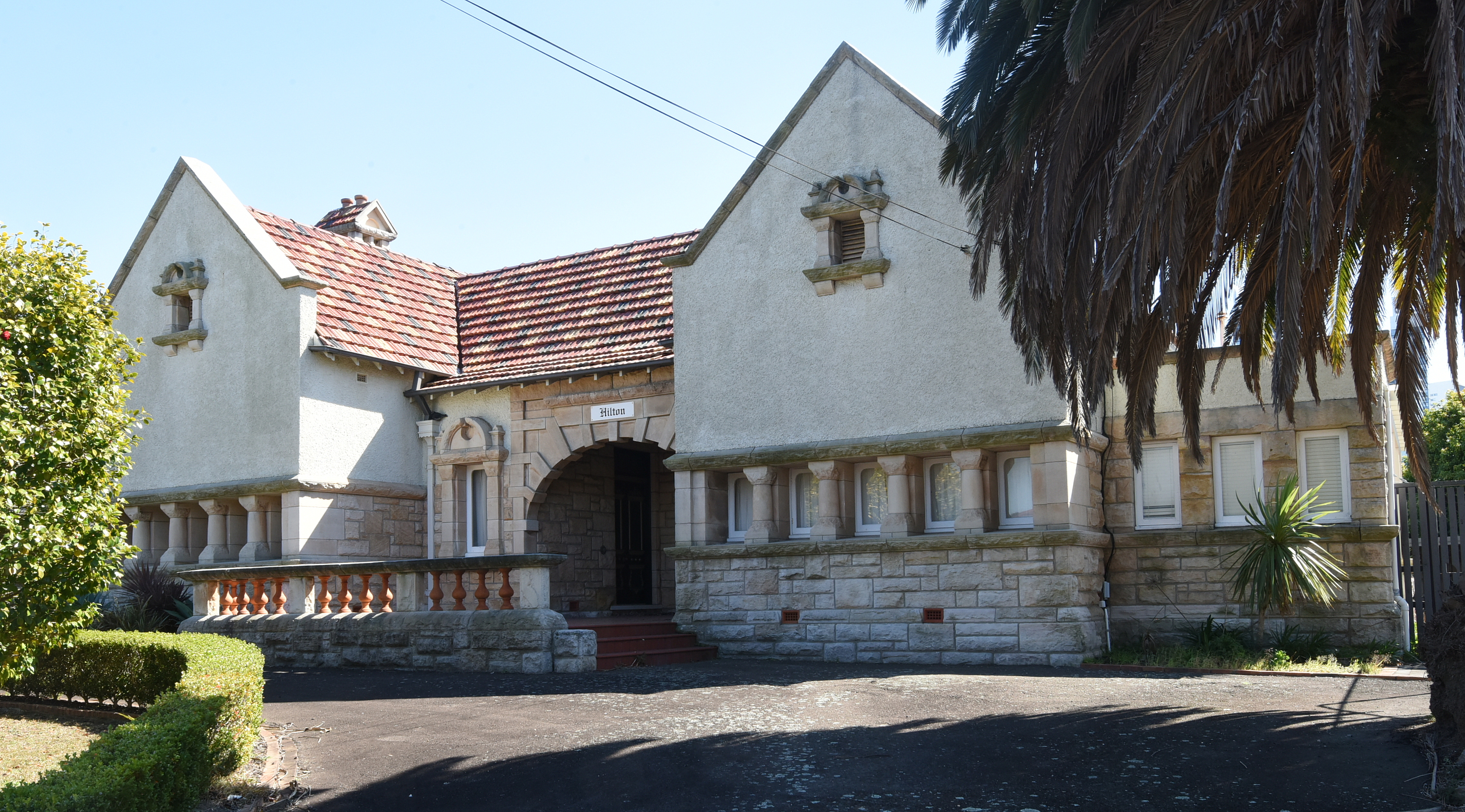
Hilton

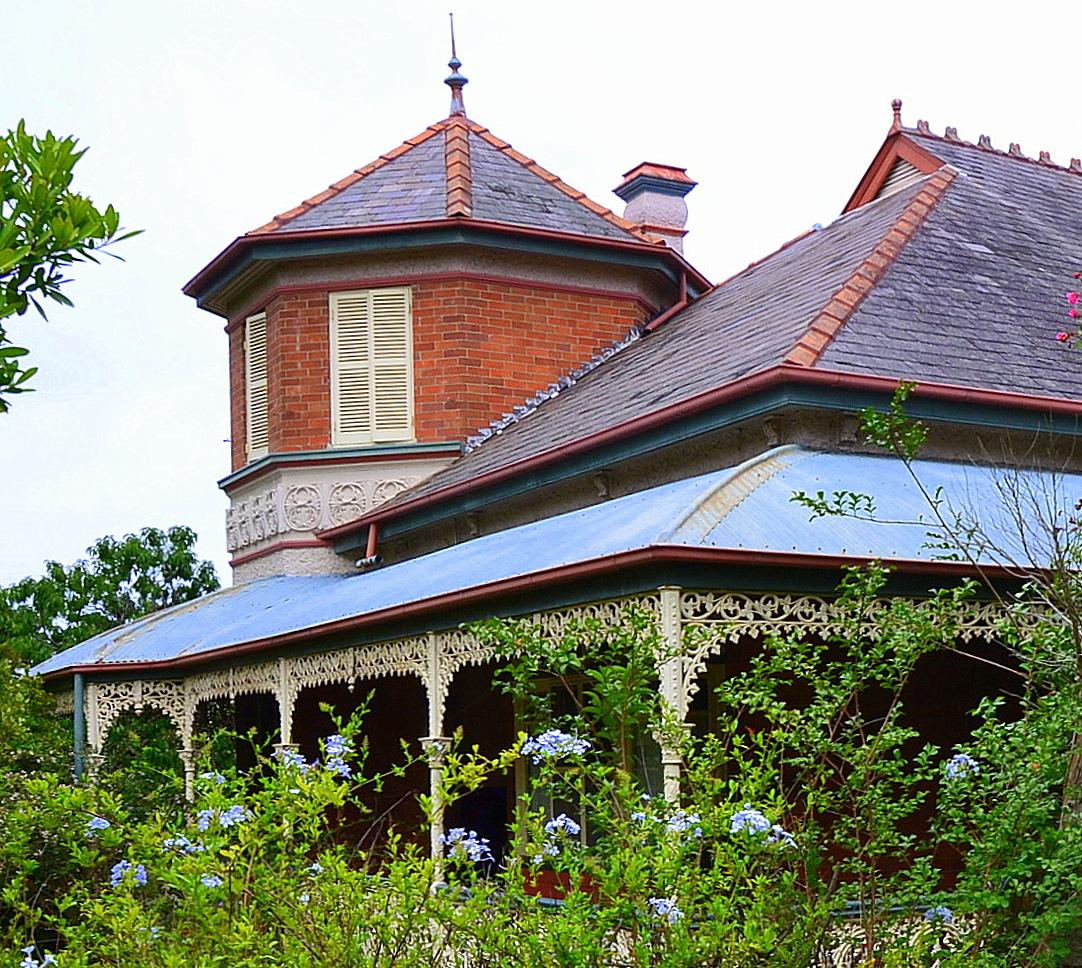
Wyckliffe

== Economy ==
Chatswood is one of the North Shore's major commercial and retail districts. The "Sydney global economic corridor", is used to describe a geographical "arch" of Sydney, home to international corporations. Many retail outlets are situated along Victoria Avenue and many office buildings are situated along the Pacific Highway.

=== Corporate headquarters ===
The Australian headquarters of Smith's Snackfood, Carnival Australia, Coffey, PepsiCo and Carter Holt Harvey as well as offices of Nortel Networks, Optus, Lenovo, NEC, Ventia and Huawei are located in Chatswood. A number of high-density residential towers are also located in Chatswood.

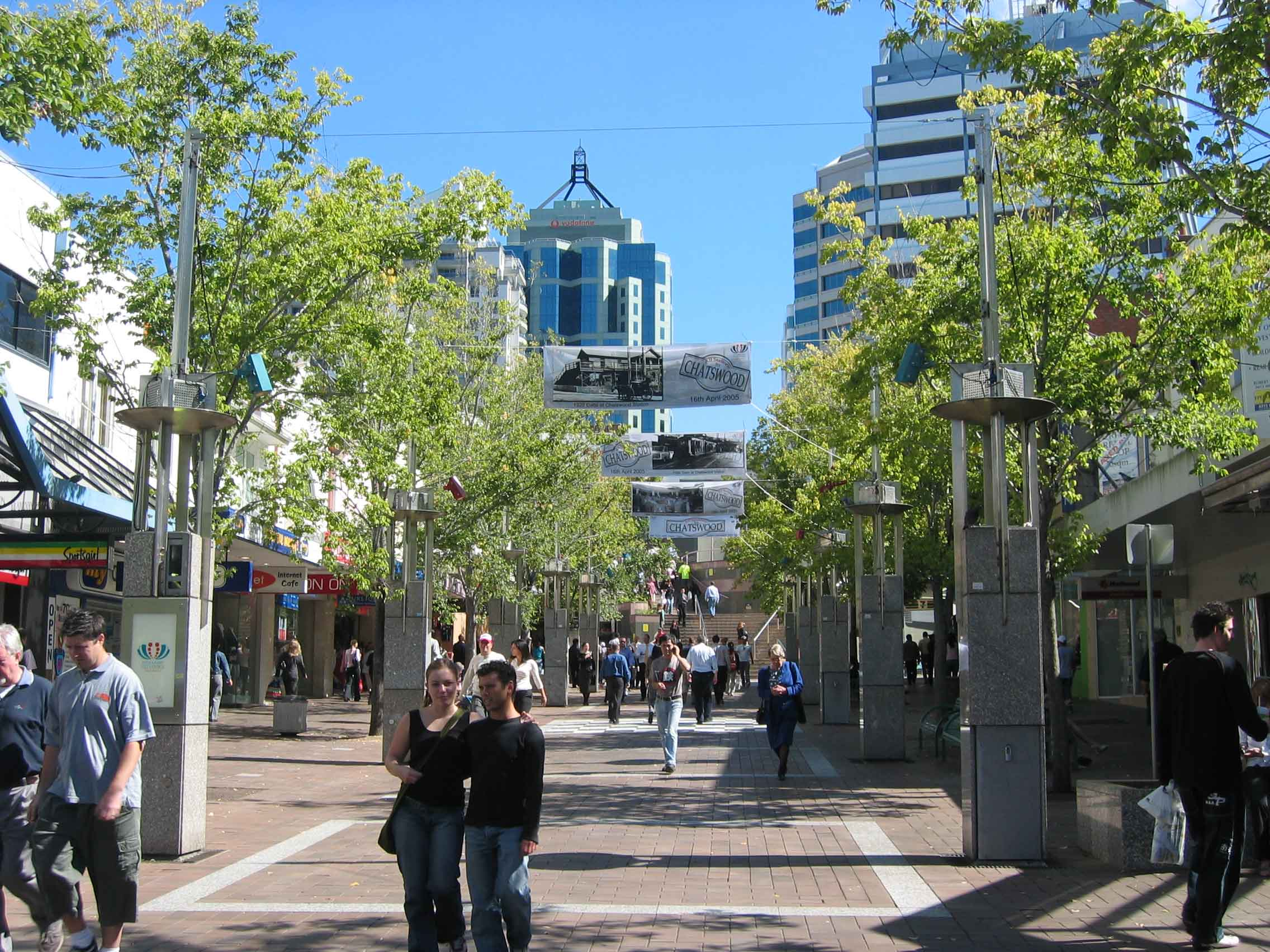
Victoria Avenue pedestrian mall known as Chatswood Mall, facing west towards Chatswood railway station

=== Retail and shopping ===
Chatswood has two major shopping centres: Chatswood Chase and Westfield Chatswood. There are also a few smaller shopping centres such as Mandarin Centre, Chatswood Interchange, Chatswood Place, Lemon Grove, The Gallery, Victoria Plaza and Orchard Arcade.

=== Outdoor markets ===
The Chatswood Mall Markets are held each Thursday and Friday in Chatswood Mall, Victoria Avenue and feature food and craft stalls, and live music.

=== Restaurants and cafes ===
Chatswood has a wide variety of restaurants and cafes and is known as a major dining destination in the Lower North Shore of Sydney. There are a large number of Chinese (including Cantonese), Japanese and Korean restaurants and eateries.

== Public transport ==
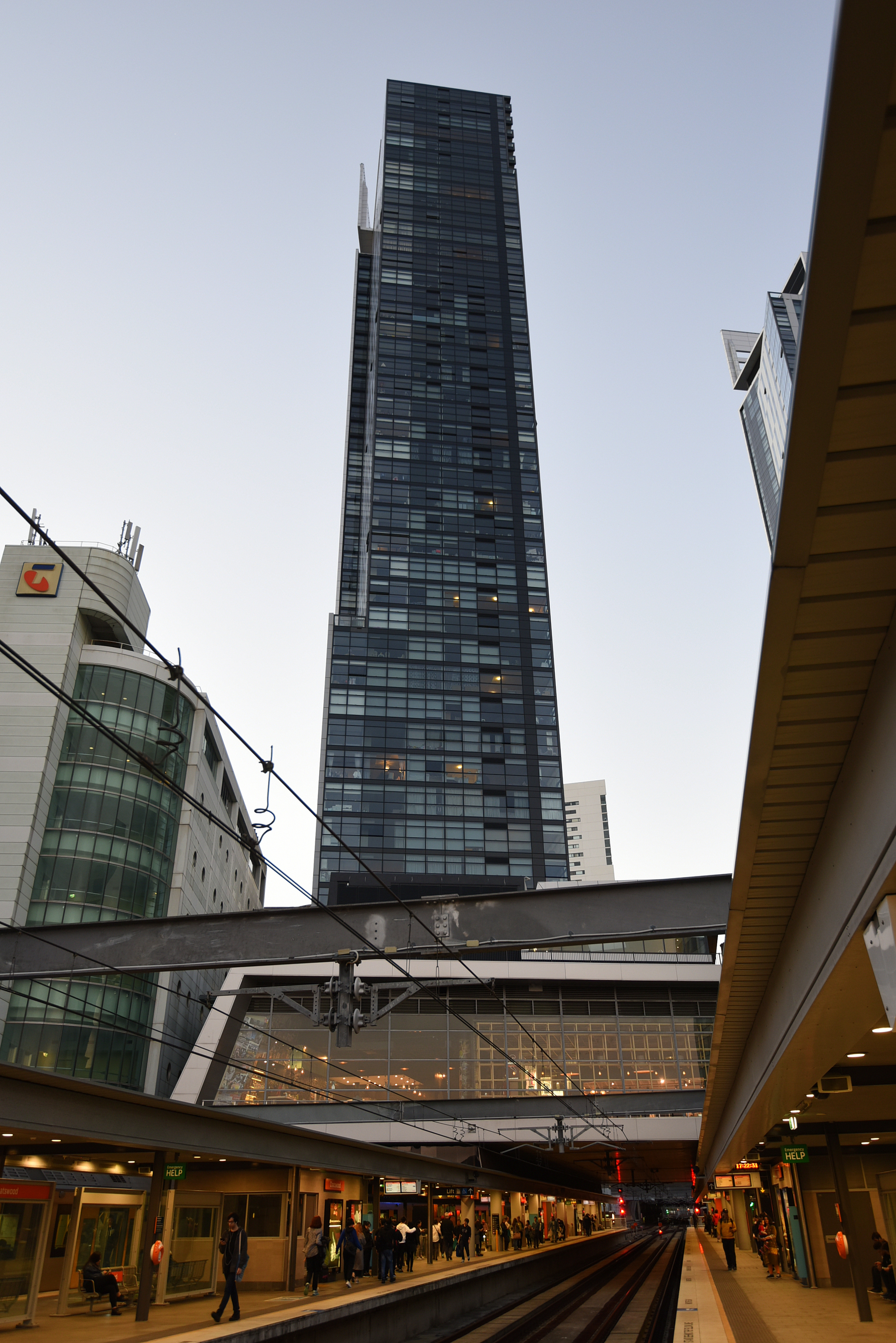
Chatswood railway station redeveloped with apartments above

=== Train ===
Chatswood railway station is served by the North Shore railway line on the Sydney Trains network. Southbound rail services run to Central before continuing to the western suburbs. Northbound rail services run to Hornsby and some peak hour services run to Gosford and Wyong. Before the conversion of the Epping to Chatswood railway line (opened in 2009) to part of the metro network, Chatswood station served as a junction between that line and the North Shore railway line.

=== Metro ===
The first stage of the Sydney Metro runs from Tallawong railway station in North West Sydney to Chatswood Station. An extension of the line to Sydenham opened on 19 August 2024, and will extend to Bankstown in 2026.

=== Buses ===
Chatswood is a major bus terminus with Busways, CDC NSW, Transit Systems and Keolis Northern Beaches services to the city, North Sydney, Mosman, St Leonards, Crows Nest, Manly, Westfield Warringah Mall, Brookvale, Ku-ring-gai, Lindfield, Belrose, Frenchs Forest, Burwood, Top Ryde, Macquarie Park, Macquarie Centre, Olympic Park, Cammeray, Crows Nest, Killarney Heights, Greenwich and Willoughby.

=== Roads ===
Major roads through Chatswood include the Pacific Highway, Mowbray Road, Boundary Street, Willoughby Road, Eastern Valley Way and Victoria Avenue. The latter forms a pedestrian mall for the section running through the main retail area.

== Demographics ==
Historical population
Year	Pop.	±%
2001	10,218	—
2006	13,513	+32.2%
2011	21,194	+56.8%
2016	24,913	+17.5%
2021	25,553	+2.6%

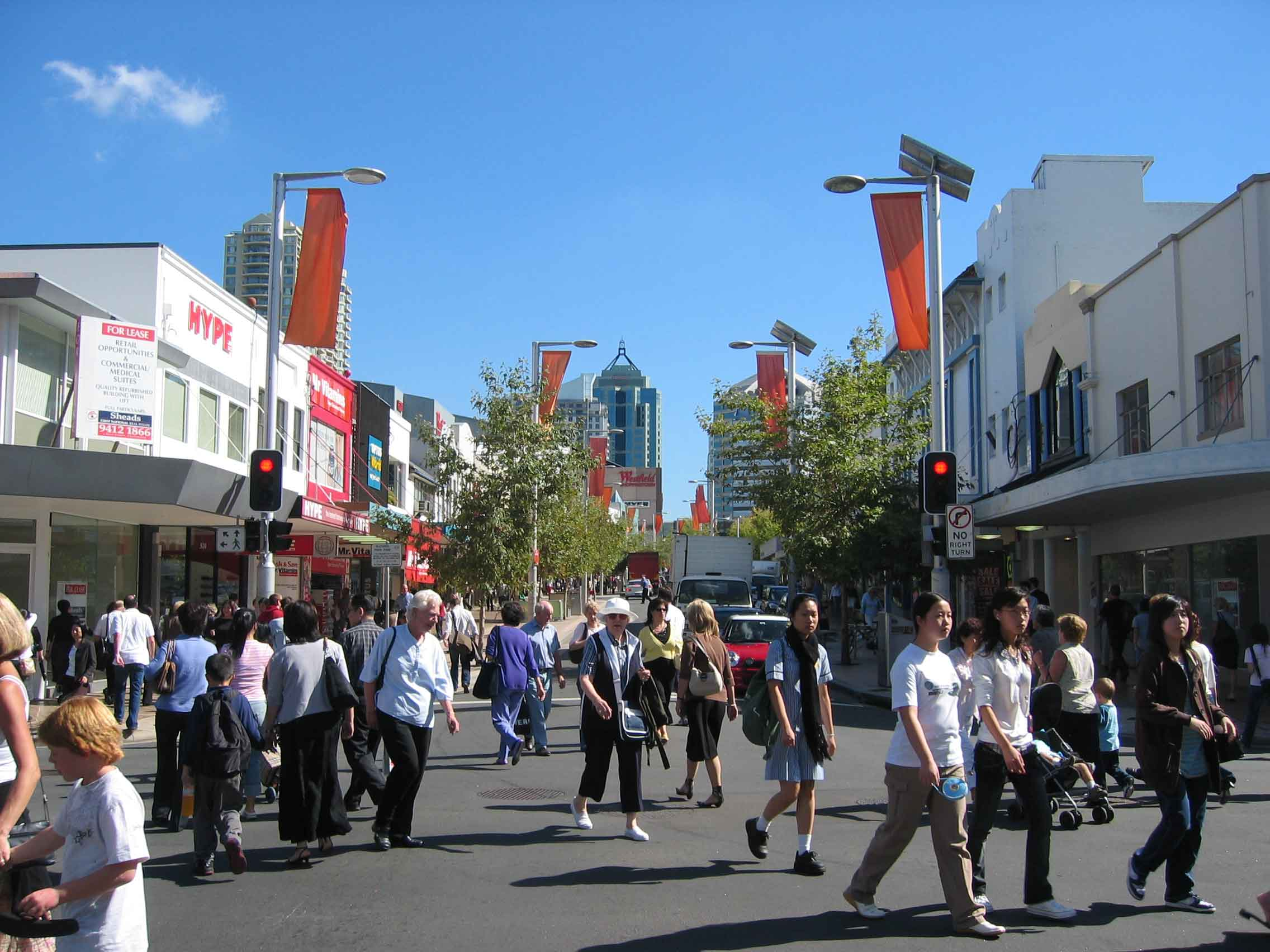
Victoria Ave and Archer St, view towards Chatswood Station

In the 2021 Australian census, the total population of Chatswood was 25,553; 12,184 (47.7%) were male and 13,371 (52.3%) were female. 34.4% of all residents were born in Australia. The most common non-Australian countries and regions of birth were China (20.1%), Hong Kong (5.5%), South Korea (4.3%), India (4.0%) and Japan (2.5%). 34.8% of people only spoke English at home. Other languages spoken at home included Mandarin (23.3%), Cantonese (12.3%), Korean (4.8%), Japanese (3.0%) and Hindi (1.9%).

The most common responses for religion were No Religion (47.0%) and Catholic (15.9%).

== Culture ==
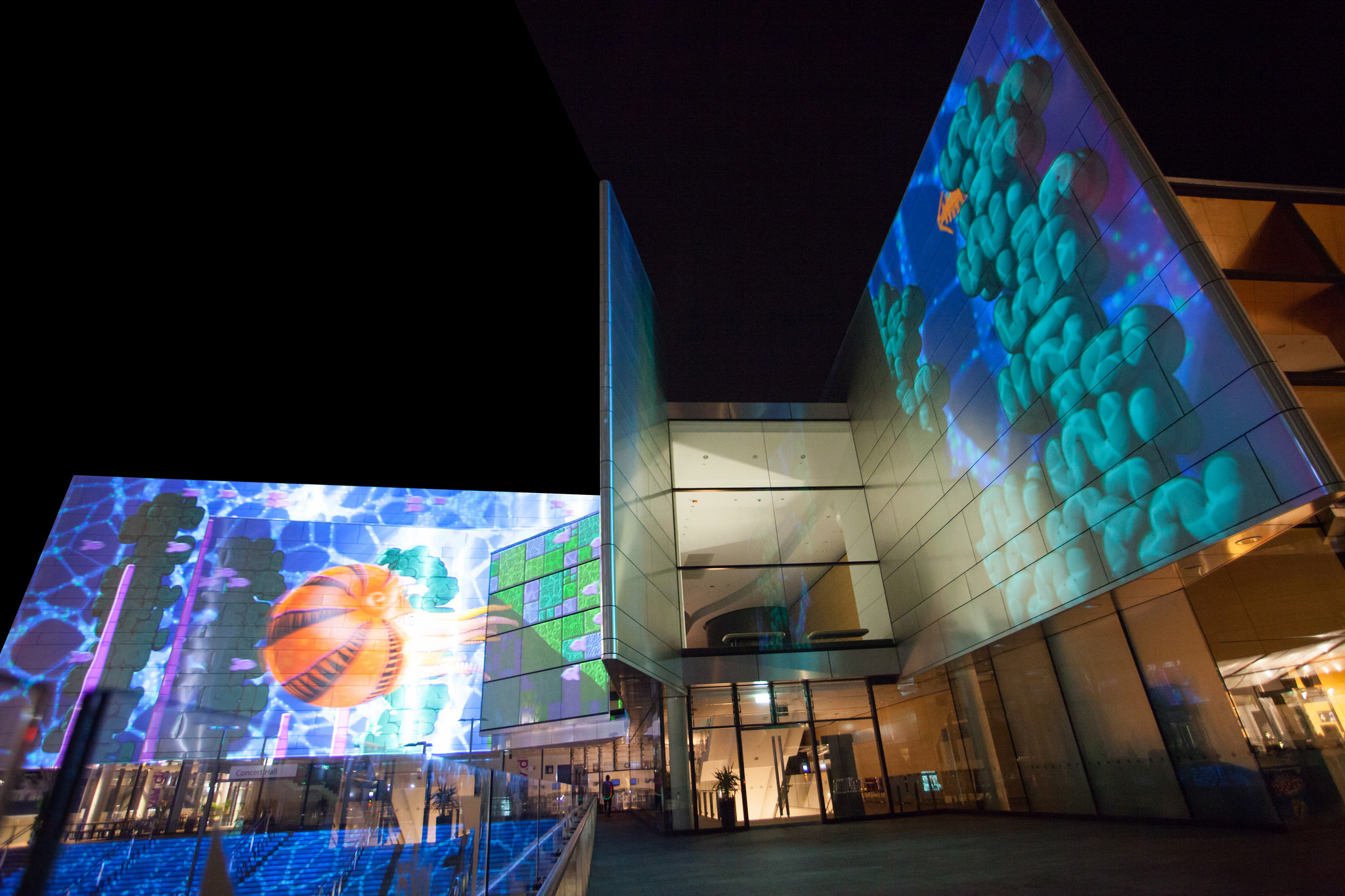
The Concourse Chatswood

The Willoughby Spring Festival is held in Chatswood in September annually. It is the second-largest in Lower Northern Sydney and is intended as testimony to a modern, multicultural and prosperous Chatswood. It showcases music, theatre, live performances, outdoor events, kids' events and visual arts. Willoughby Theatre Company (formerly Willoughby Musical Society) is based in Chatswood. It specialises in musical theatre. Chatswood Musical Society also performs musical theatre, but their events are staged in Pymble. The Zenith Theatre stages both musicals and drama. The Willoughby Symphony Orchestra is based in Chatswood. Two dance companies share the Dance and Music Centre. A Chinese Cultural Centre has existed since 1996. The Willoughby Historical Society runs the Willoughby Museum in Boronia, a Federation cottage in South Chatswood. The Concourse, Chatswood, a new cultural centre, was commissioned by Willoughby Council in 2007 and was completed in 2011. It includes the 5,000 m^{2} Chatswood Library, a 1,000-seat concert hall, 500-seat theatre, exhibition spaces, commercial spaces, cafes and restaurants. The Concourse was opened on 11 September 2011 by the Governor of NSW, Her Excellency Professor Marie Bashir AC CVO.

== Schools ==
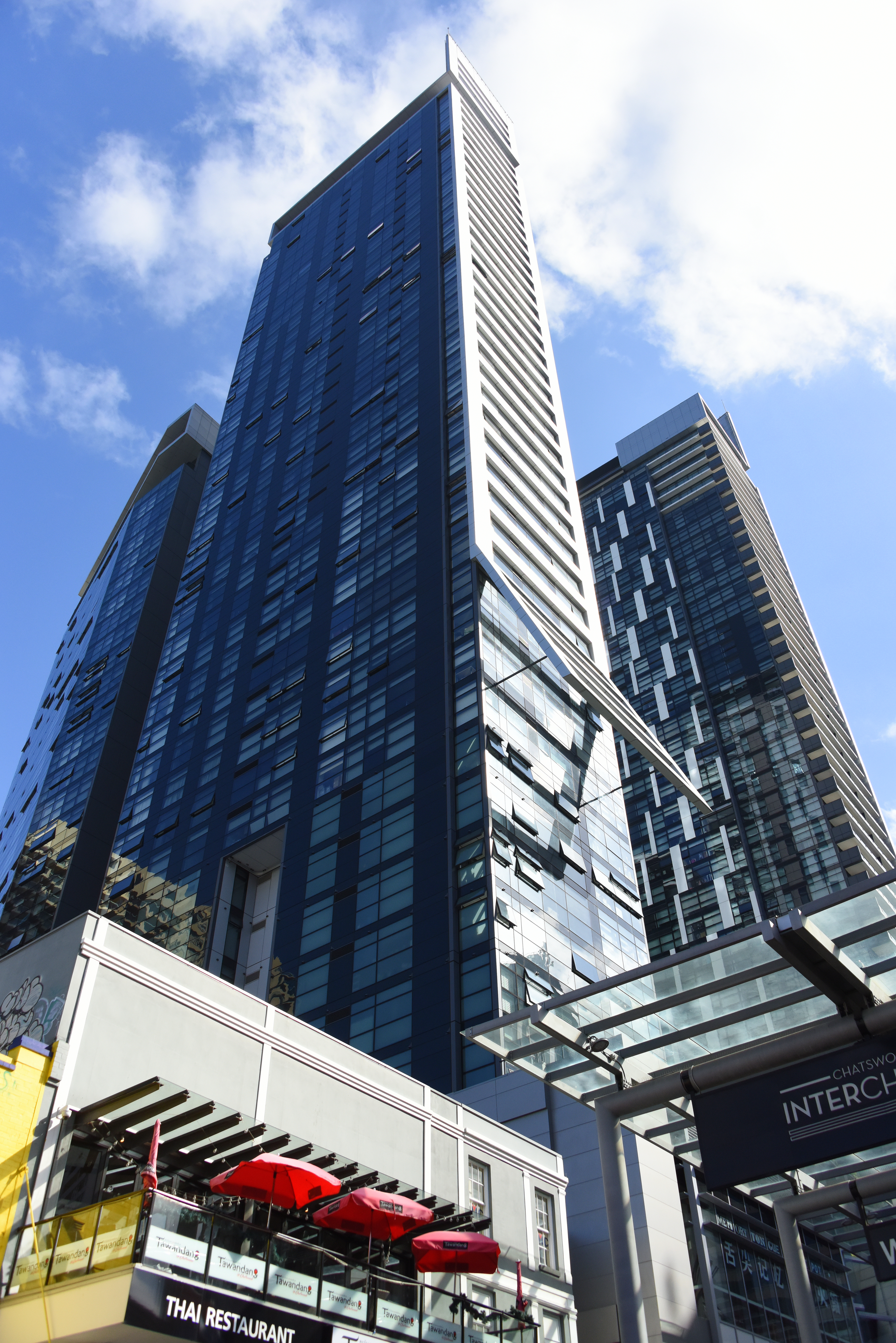
High-rise buildings in the commercial area of Chatswood

Chatswood has both public and private primary and secondary schools. These include:

- Chatswood High School (Years 7–12). Originally a boys' school with a Cadet Corps until the 1950s when it changed to a coeducational school.
- Chatswood Public School (Years K–6). Opened in 1883.
- St Pius X College (Years 5–12) (originally called Christian Brothers)
- Our Lady of Dolours Catholic Primary School (years K–6)
- Mercy Catholic College (years 7–12) (originally called St Catherine's)

The Mowbray House School operated in Chatswood from 1906 until its closure in 1954. The Church of England Girls' School Chatswood was also formerly located in Chatswood, having been closed since the 1940s.

== Places of worship ==
- Grace City Church Chatswood (Doherty Community Centre)
- LifeSource Christian Church
- Our Lady of Dolours Catholic Church
- St Paul's Anglican Church
- Redeemer City Church
- Chatswood Baptist Church
- Chatswood Presbyterian Church
- Chatswood Church of Christ
- Chatswood Seventh-Day Adventist Church
- Chatswood Christian Science Church
- Armenian Apostolic Church of Holy Resurrection
- Salvation Army, Chatswood Corps
- Chatswood Malayalam (Pentecostal) Church
- IBAA Chatswood Buddhist Centre
- Tibetan Buddhist Healing Practices
- Hillsong Chatswood (Chinese Extension Service)
- Church of Scientology Advanced Organization and Saint Hill ANZO
- North Shore Temple Emanuel (Progressive Jewish)

== Sport ==
Due to historical reasons, Chatswood is often represented by teams that by name represent the Ku-ring-gai Council suburb of Gordon and this is the case for both Cricket and rugby union with Chatswood Oval being the home ground for both the Gordon District Cricket Club and the Gordon Rugby Club. The Gordon Rugby Club was created as a club for players living Chatswood and further North who wanted a shorter commute to games. In rugby league, Chatswood does not have a specific team that plays home games in Chatswood but is represented on a catchment area basis by the North Sydney Bears, officially the North Sydney District Rugby League Football Club who play in nearby North Sydney. The Bears are the only Sydney rugby league team without NRL representation to have a junior catchment area. There have been ongoing efforts to resurrect the Bears with the most recent proposal being a partnership with Western Australia. Chatswood lacks a specific junior team for the suburb, although the de facto local team is the Willoughby Roos, as Chatswood is the council seat for the City of Willoughby.

Localised sports teams in Chatswood include:

- Chatswood Rangers Sports Club – football and netball
- Chatswood Gypsies Cricket Club – cricket
- Chatswood Rugby Club – rugby union
- Chatswood Lawn Bowls and Croquet club
- Chatswood Tennis Club
- Chatswood Golf Course
- Chatswood Scout Group
- Chatswood Girl Guides Group

== Climate ==
Climate data for Chatswood
Month	Jan	Feb	Mar	Apr	May	Jun	Jul	Aug	Sep	Oct	Nov	Dec	Year
Mean daily maximum °C (°F)	26.5 (79.7)	26.4 (79.5)	25.2 (77.4)	22.7 (72.9)	19.6 (67.3)	17.2 (63.0)	16.7 (62.1)	18.3 (64.9)	20.7 (69.3)	22.7 (72.9)	24.2 (75.6)	25.7 (78.3)	22.2 (72.0)
Mean daily minimum °C (°F)	17.5 (63.5)	17.7 (63.9)	16.1 (61.0)	12.9 (55.2)	9.9 (49.8)	7.7 (45.9)	6.4 (43.5)	7.1 (44.8)	9.3 (48.7)	12.0 (53.6)	14.1 (57.4)	16.3 (61.3)	12.3 (54.1)
Average precipitation mm (inches)	106.3 (4.19)	161.1 (6.34)	121.7 (4.79)	104.7 (4.12)	102.1 (4.02)	127.0 (5.00)	82.1 (3.23)	79.2 (3.12)	51.5 (2.03)	84.7 (3.33)	104.7 (4.12)	80.6 (3.17)	1,216.2 (47.88)

== Parks ==
Chatswood Oval is located south of the railway station. Beauchamp Park, located on Nicholson Street, features a playground, an oval, a fenced dog area and a bike track. It was named after William Lygon, 7th Earl Beauchamp, the Governor of New South Wales. In 2015 a memorial to the Armenian community was erected in the park. Another small but well-laid out park, with an industrial heritage theme, is the Mashman Park on Victoria Avenue at Septimus Street. This park pays tribute to the Mashmans brick and tile works that once stood there. Chatswood is close to Lane Cove National Park.

July 2016 saw the unveiling of Bartels Park in Chatswood West. Named in honour of the recently deceased former Willoughby Mayor Greg Bartels, the park is the former Edgar Street reserve.

The Garden of Remembrance, near the railway station, commemorates the fallen men of the suburb who fought in the Boer War, World War 1, World War 2, The Korean War and Vietnam War. The roses were all grown from original cuttings of briar roses taken from the Somme region of France where more than one million soldiers were wounded or lost their lives at The Battle of Somme in 1916. At the centre of the Garden stands the Willoughby Council Peace Tablet, which commemorates the signing of The Treaty of Versailles in 1918.

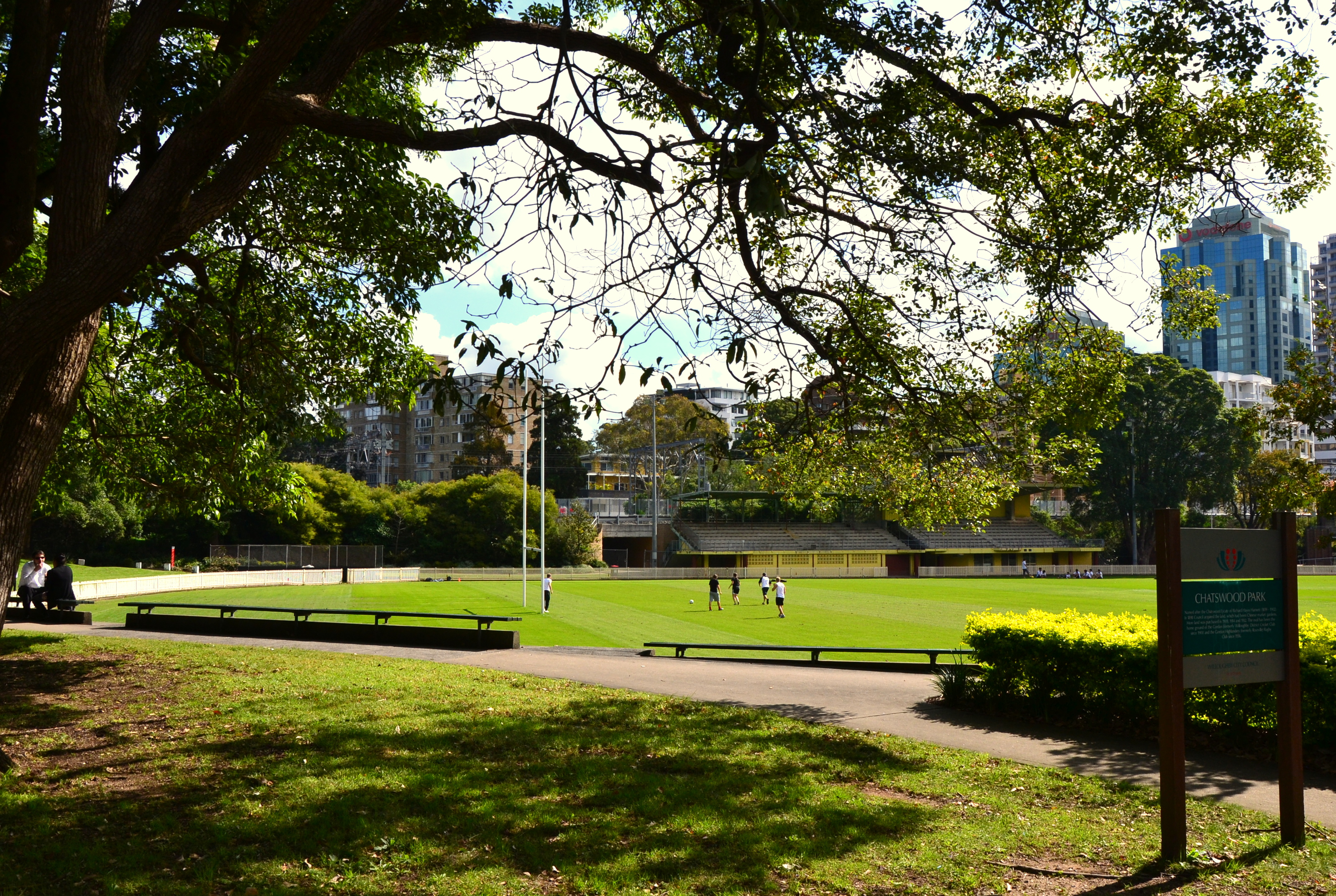
Chatswood Park and oval, Orchard Road

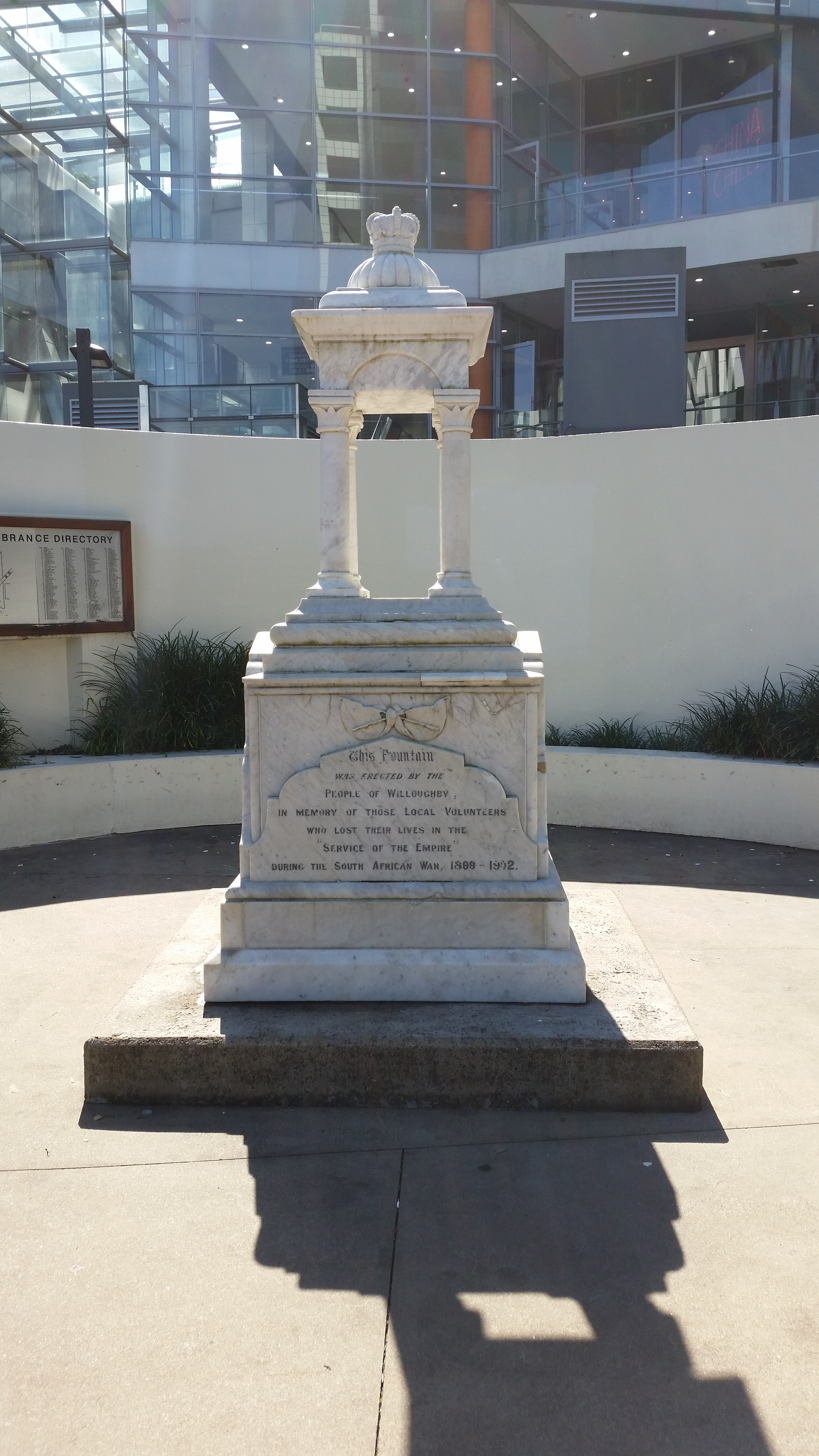
Willoughby Council Peace Tablet in Chatswood Memorial Gardens

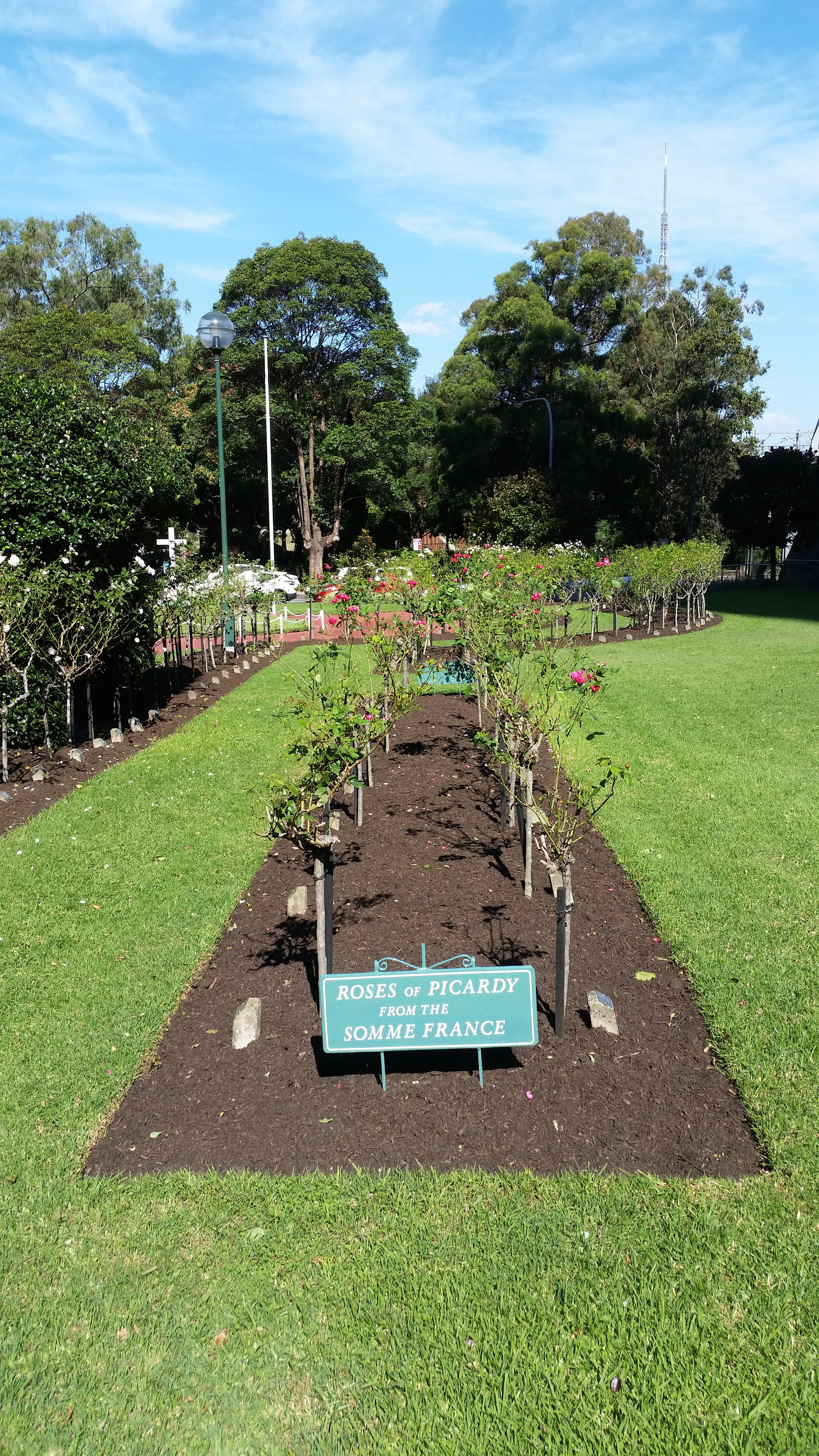
"The Roses of Picardy" rose-beds in Chatswood Memorial Gardens

== Notable residents ==
The following residents have lived or were educated in Chatswood:

- Cec Blinkhorn, rugby league player
- Ruth Cracknell, actor
- Yvonne Kenny, opera singer
- Arthur Murch, artist
- Banjo Paterson, poet
- Kenneth Slessor, poet
- Mark Taylor, cricketer
- Victor Trumper, cricketer
- Brett Whiteley, painter and artist
- Roger Woodward, pianist
- Gough Whitlam, former Prime Minister
