= The Concourse, Chatswood =

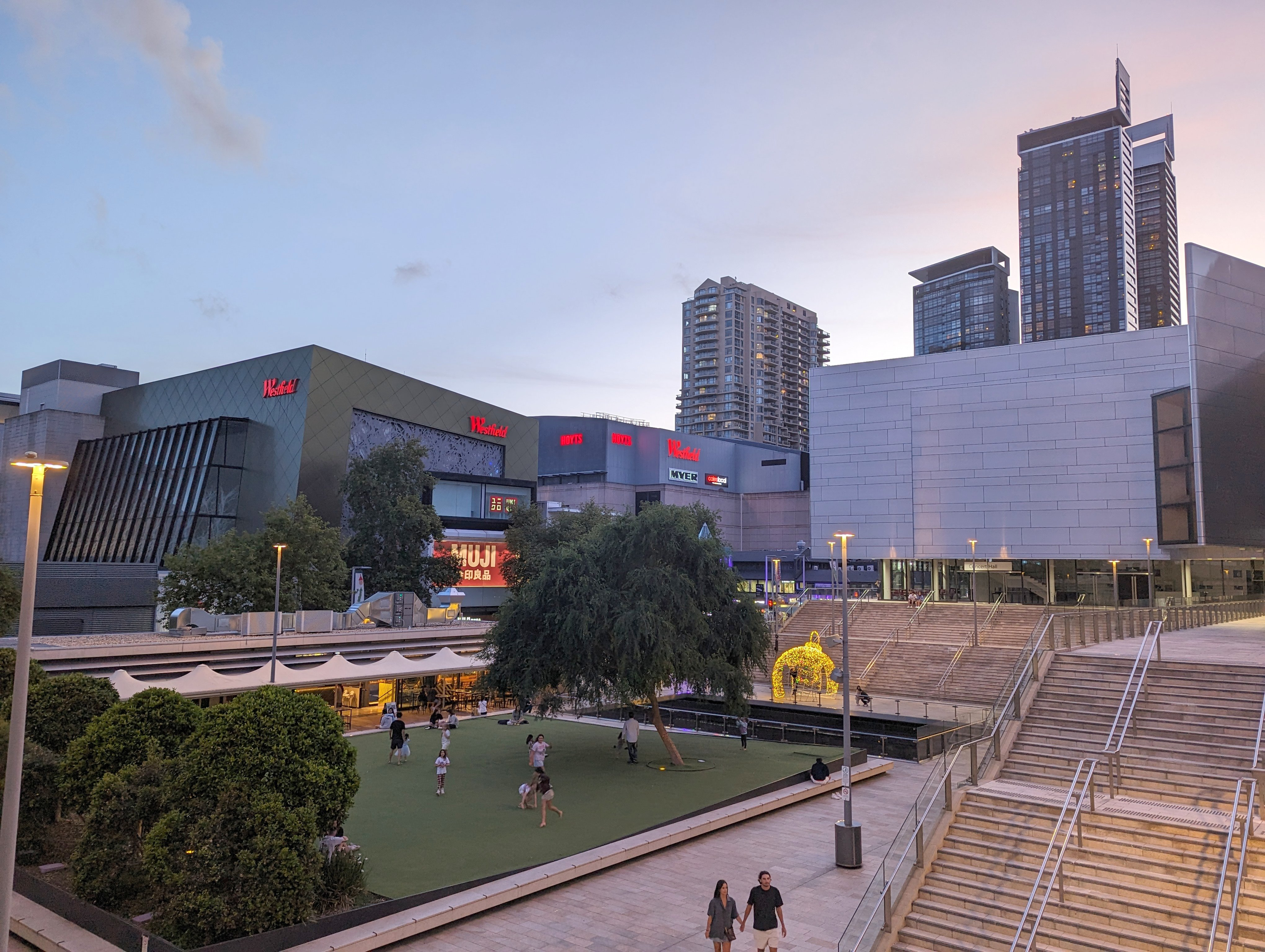
- The Concourse at sunset
- Interactive map of the The Concourse, Chatswood area

General information
- Location: 409 Victoria Avenue, Chatswood, New South Wales
- Coordinates: 33°47′44″S 151°11′00″E
- Opened: 10 September 2011

Other information
- Seating capacity: Concert Hall: 1000; Theatre: 500; Civic Pavilion: 500

Website
- The Concourse

The Concourse is a cultural centre in Chatswood, a suburb in Lower North Shore, Sydney. Opened in 2011, the complex includes facilities such as a civic pavilion, a concert hall, Chatswood Library, a theatre and other venues for cultural uses.

== History ==
In 1903, the first Willoughby Town Hall was built on the current site of The Concourse, also functioning as the Council Chambers. The site was shared with the Council Pound, the School of Arts, and the Ku-ring-gai Masonic Lodge. In 1967, a three-storey ad administration building was constructed on the site, with a fourth floor was added in 1980.

The new cultural complex was designed by Francis-Jones Morehen Thorp architects. Following demolition of the old buildings, construction of The Concourse began in July 2008 at a cost of approximately $162 million and was completed in July 2011. The complex was officially opened on 17 September 2011 by then Governor of New South Wales Marie Bashir, and mayor of Willoughby, Pat Reilly.

== Facilities ==
The Concourse features a public open space, a 500-seat theatre, rehearsal spaces, a 1,000-seat concert hall, cafés, retail and commercial outlets, a boutique hotel, and a multi-purpose exhibition hall. The Concourse also includes car parking over two basement levels and a 5,000 m^{3} stormwater detention tank as part of an integrated water management system.

Art Space on The Concourse, a 92 m^{2} exhibition space, is located on the ground floor of The Concourse, hosting art exhibitions from local artists and art collectives.

Chatswood Library, over 5,000 m^{2} in size, is also located in The Concourse. The library is on the lower ground level, accessible from the main podium via lifts or stairs. KLIK Systems, an Australian linear lighting manufacturer, was commissioned to design and supply indoor beam luminaries in the library.

== Patrons ==
Patrons of The Concourse include leading figures in Australia's arts industries including soprano Yvonne Kenny, poet Les Murray, authors Matthew Reilly and Renée Goossens, and rock icon Angry Anderson AM.

== Events ==
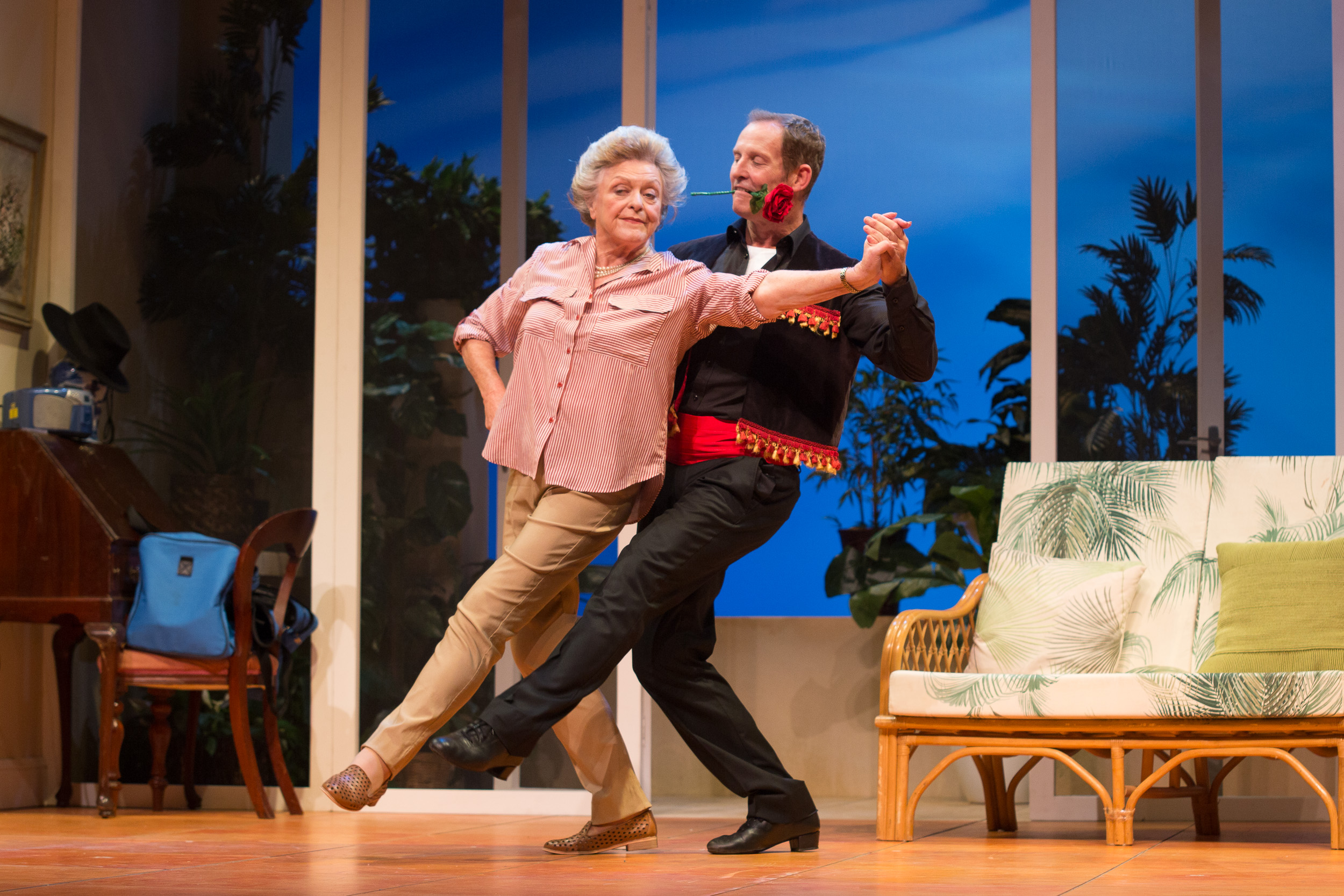
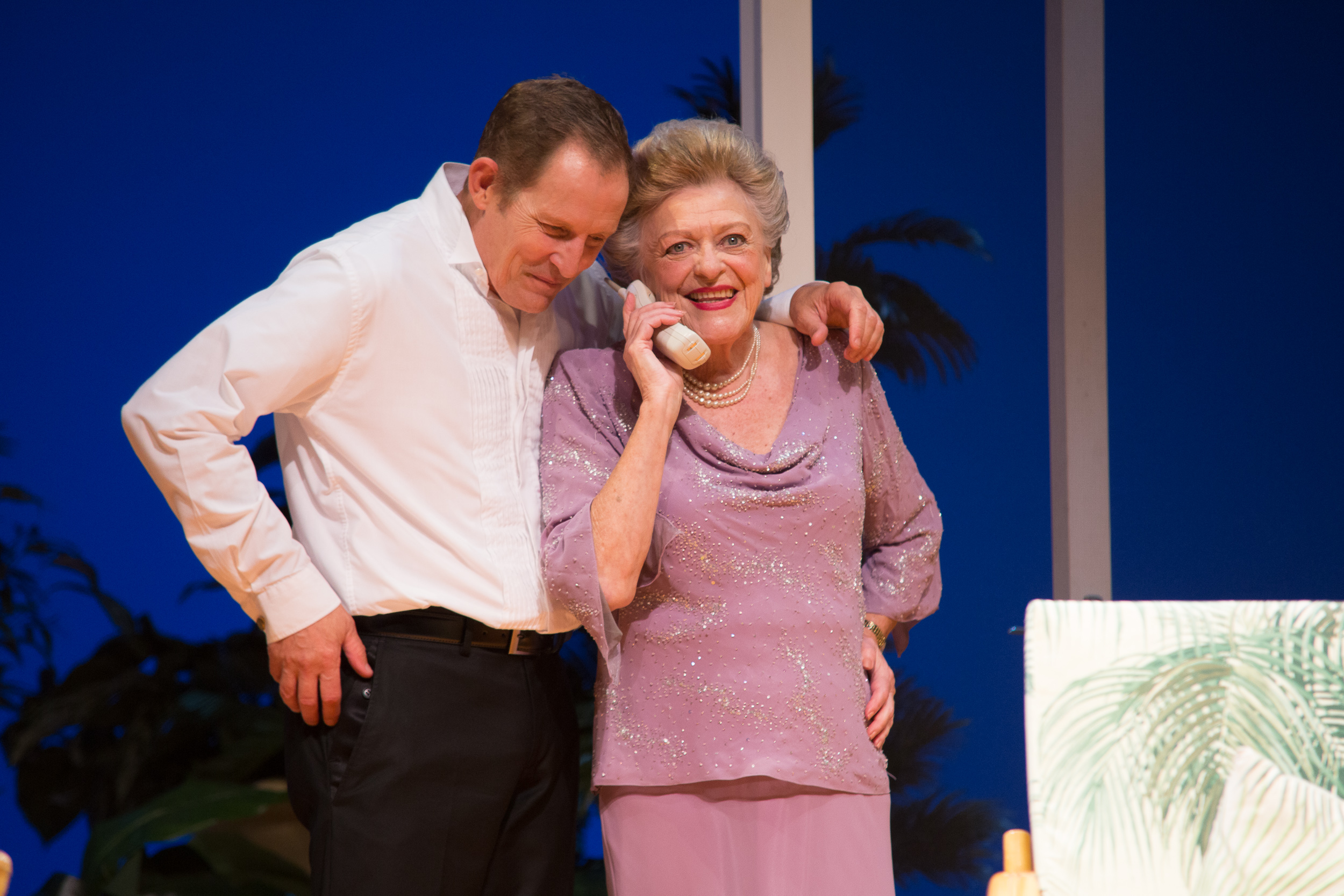
Todd McKenney and Nancye Hayes performing together in Six Dance Lessons in Six Weeks (2016 Ensemble Theatre production at The Concourse, photos by Clare Hawley)

The Concourse hosts a wide range of events. From Musicals to Corporate events, they have room for them all.

Recently The Concourse has seen productions of Singin' in the Rain (Willoughby Theatre Company), the NSSWE spring festival, A Chorus Line (Willoughby Theatre Company) and many more.
