= Chatswood Chase =

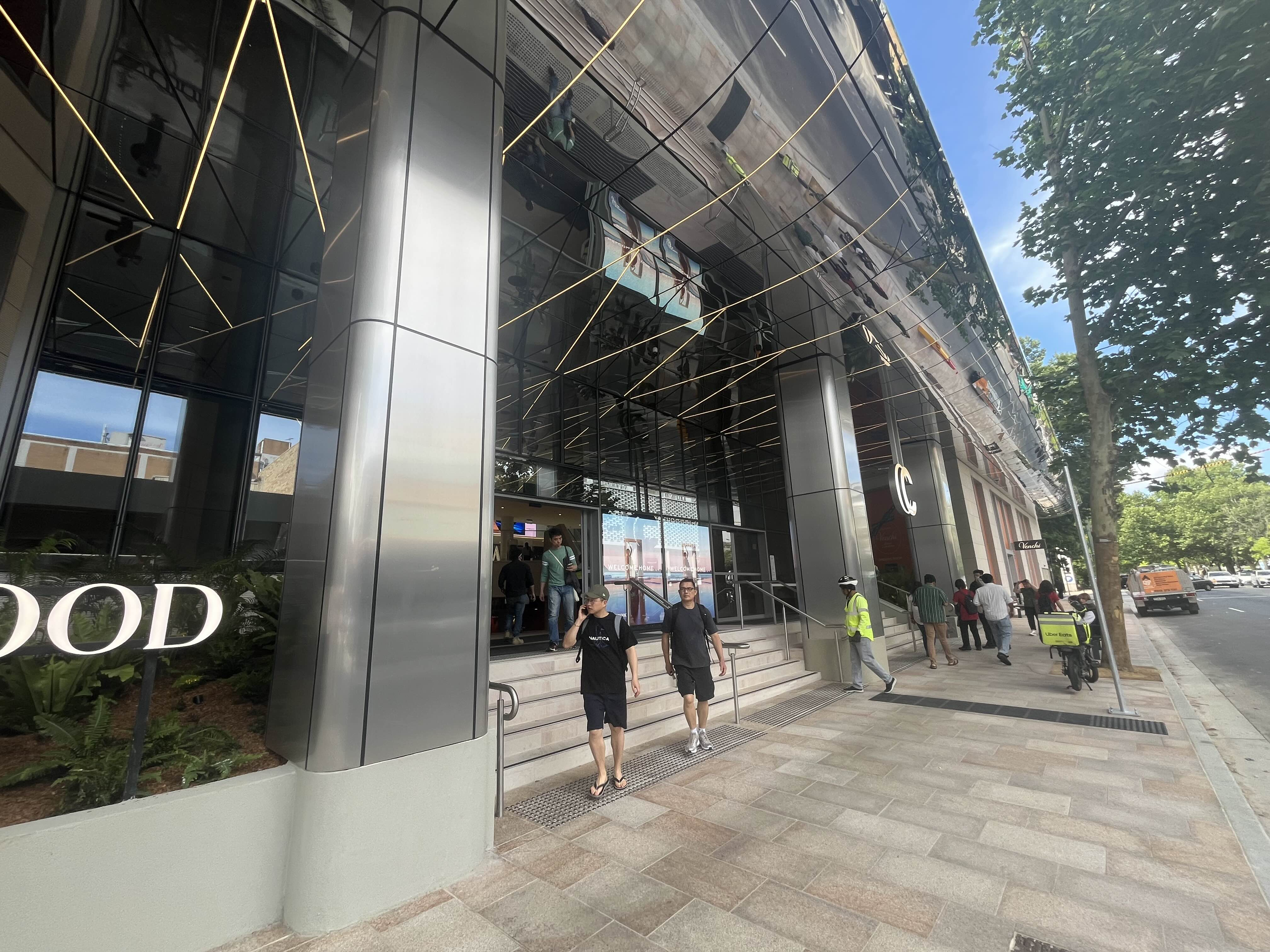
- Victoria Avenue entrance to Chatswood Chase
- Location: Chatswood, New South Wales, Australia
- Coordinates: 33°47′39″S 151°11′10″E
- Address: 345 Victoria Avenue
- Opened: 23 March 1983
- Manager: Vicinity Centres
- Owner: Vicinity Centres
- Num. of stores: 170
- Num. of anchor tenants: 3
- Floor area: 84,000 m^{2} (904,168 sq ft)
- Floors: 5
- Parking: 2,434 spaces
- Public transit: Chatswood
- Website: chatswoodchase.com.au

Chatswood Chase is a shopping centre in the suburb of Chatswood on the Lower North Shore of Sydney, Australia.

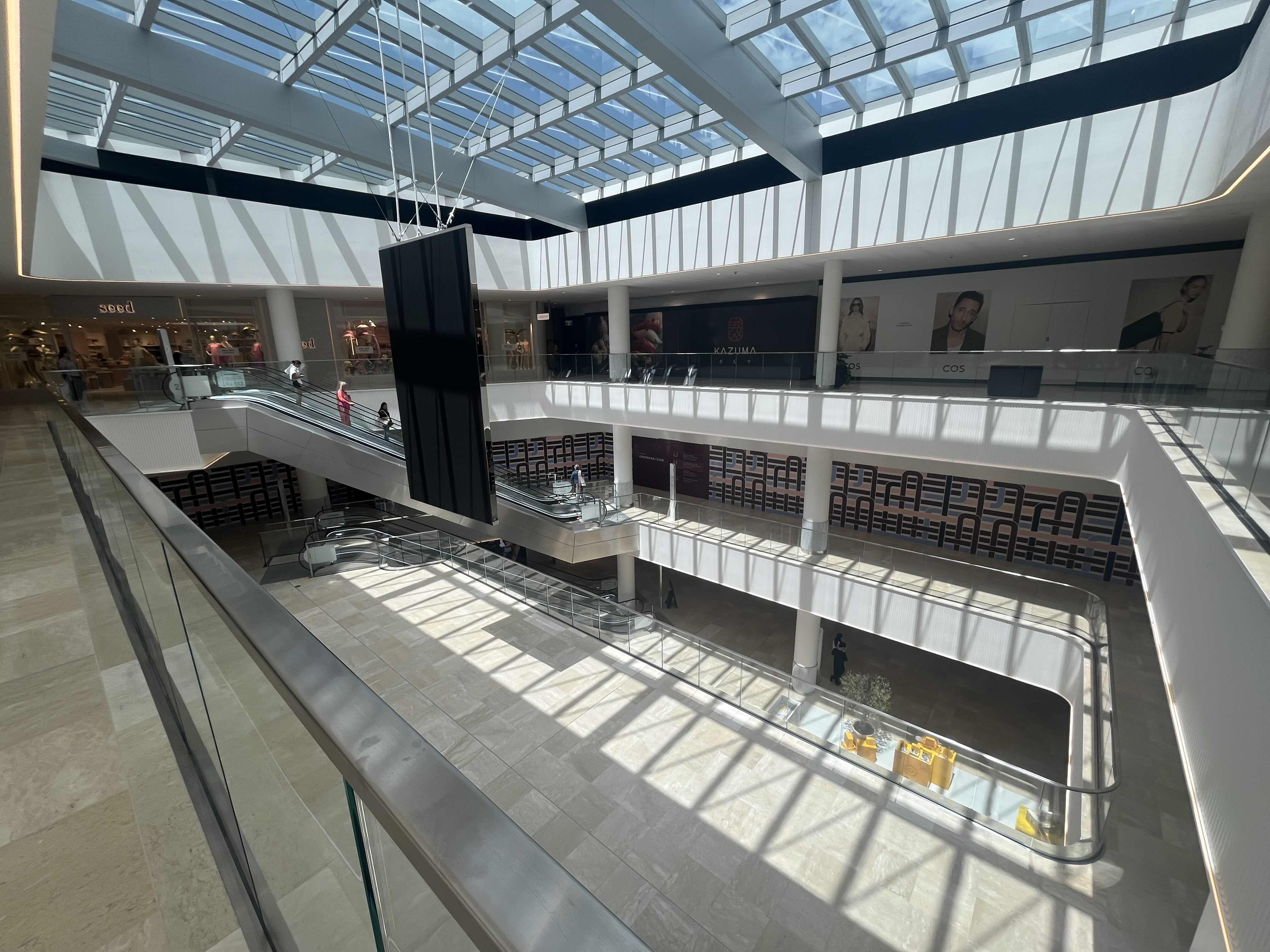
Atrium

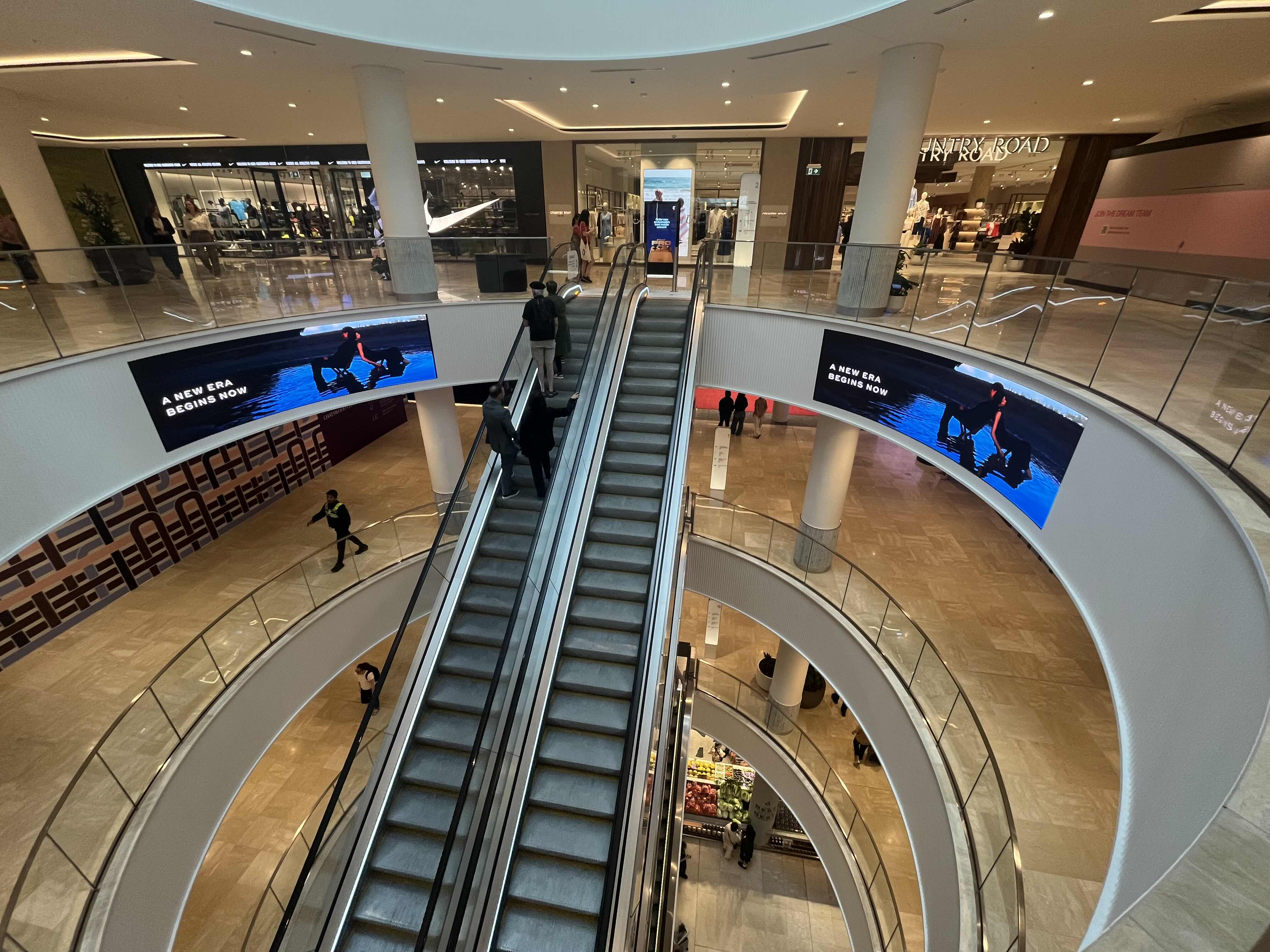
Centre Court

== History ==
In the early 1970s, Willoughby Council developed the Chatswood Plan which marked Chatswood as the centre of future community infrastructure and emphasised the council's ongoing commitment to retail development. It had hopes that it would ensure the town centre's continuing importance as a regional retail centre. David Jones submitted a proposal to build a shopping centre that would contain two department stores David Jones and Myer. on a site in Archer Street. In 1975 the site in Archer Street was given an Interim Development Order. David Jones's rival Grace Bros had also proposed to build a shopping centre containing a supermarket and another department store adjacent to its existing store which opened in 1961 on Victoria Avenue. In 1978 the David Jones proposal was approved after disputes between Grace Bros and the State Government.

Pre-development work on Chatswood Chase had begun in 1981 before Grace Bros dropped its final legal challenge. The works involved demolition of residential cottages and the church that stood on the site which was later reconstructed on an adjacent block of land. Sections of Neridah Street and Mills Lane were permanently closed and incorporated into the site and an open natural watercourse piped and diverted.

It developed by Loralt Chatswood, with Loralt (NSW) Pty Ltd and the Superannuation Fund Investment Trust each owning 50%. In November 1987, Loralt took full ownership. Loralt was owned by Melbourne investors Maurie Alter, Marc Besen, Ted Lustig and Max Moar. The centre was completed in 14 months.

Chatswood Chase officially opened on 23 March 1983 by and was the first large scale shopping centre after the opening of Wallace Way and Lemon Grove in the 1980s. The centre contained a Coles New World supermarket, Kmart, David Jones and it was the home to the only Myer store in NSW until the early 1990s then briefly became Grace Bros before closing altogether. This made Chatswood the only suburb in Sydney to have two Grace Bros stores around this time. The space vacated by Grace Bros became a food court and speciality stores.

In September 2003 it was sold to the CFS Gandel Retail Trust.

In 2007 a large and extensive redevelopment, growing the centre's gross lettable area by approximately 10,300 m^{2} commenced. Total cost was around $185 million.

The trust previously reported the acquisition of an adjoining office building at 19 Havilah Street in Chatswood and has since also secured an option to purchase the access lane to Chatswood Chase off Malvern Avenue to facilitate the proposed redevelopment.

This involved relocating Coles supermarket into a larger retail area, undertaking a major extension to the lower ground retail space, the introduction of a new food court, the addition of approximately 130 new car parking spaces and an upgrade to the Victoria Avenue entrance. Work on the expansion concluded in 2010 and the centre was renamed to Chatswood Chase Sydney.

Apple opened its second Apple Store in Australia on 9 August 2008.

In August 2012, Harvey Norman closed its store due to poor sales and was replaced by JB Hi-Fi.

In November 2017, GIC purchased a 49% shareholding. Vicinity announced its re-acquisition of this 49% stake in October 2023, with the deal closing in March 2024.

== Tenants ==
Chatswood Chase Sydney has 63,815m² of floor space. The major retailers include David Jones, Kmart, Coles and Apple.

== Redevelopment ==
In May 2019, an expansion to the shopping centre was announced. The $327 million expansion included two new levels of shops, a seven screen cinema and "sunken oasis" dining plaza, served by extended trading hours and with an on-site gym and wellness facility. However on 10 June 2020, this redevelopment was postponed indefinitely due to the ongoing COVID-19 pandemic; the redevelopment eventually commenced in line with Vicinity's full acquisition of the centre in early 2024. Redevelopment started in March 2024 and reopened on 23 October 2025, with full re-opening expected in the first half of 2026.. The redevelopment will expand the retail area by an additional 20,000 square metres.

== Transport ==
The Metro North West & Bankstown and North Shore lines offer frequent services to Chatswood station which is a short (~15 min) walk from the centre.

Chatswood Chase has frequent bus connections to Sydney CBD, North Shore and Northern Sydney, as well as surrounding suburbs. It is served by Busways, CDC NSW and Keolis Northern Beaches services with bus stops on Victoria Avenue and Archer Street.

Chatswood Chase also has multi level car parks with 2,434 spaces.

== Incidents ==
On 21 July 2019, a 52-year-old man committed suicide by jumping from an upper floor after attempting to murder his 14-year-old daughter, who survived with minor injuries.
