= Aussie (disambiguation) =

Aussie is Australian slang for Australian, both the adjective and the noun.

Aussie(s) may also refer to:

== Companies and brands ==
- Aussie (financial group), an Australian retail financial services group
- Aussie (shampoo), a brand of shampoo
- Aussie Broadband, an Australian telecommunications and internet retail service provider

== People ==
- Aussie Cossack, nickname of nationalist Russian Simeon Boikov, in the Russian embassy in Canberra since 2022
- Aussie Malcolm (1940–2024), a New Zealand politician
- Aussie Trump (born 1971), a former Australian politician

== Sport ==
- Aussie (trimaran), a day-racing sailboat designed by Ray Kendrick
- Aussie, an Inflatable Rescue Boat (IRB) Racing award
- Sydney Football Stadium (1988), a former sports stadium in Sydney, originally known as Aussie stadium

== Other uses ==
- "Aussie (poster)" series of posters by artist Peter Drew
- Aussie: The Australian Soldiers' Magazine, a World War I publication
- "Aussie" (Not Going Out), a 2006 television episode
- Australian Shepherd, a breed of dog
- Australian Surf Life Saving Championships or The Aussies
