= FFO =

FFO may refer to:

- Finnish People's Organisation (Swedish: Finlands Folkorganisation), a political party in Finland
- Firefly Online, a video game
- Frankfurt (Oder), Germany
- Frankfurt East station, in Germany
- Funds from operations, a measure of revenue for investment trusts
- Furnace fuel oil
- Norwegian Federation of Organisations of Disabled People (Norwegian: Funksjonshemmedes Fellesorganisasjon)
- Wright-Patterson Air Force Base, in Ohio, United States
