= Sydney stabbing =

Sydney stabbing or similar terms may refer to:

- 2019 Sydney CBD stabbings, by Mert Ney, killing one person
- Bondi Junction stabbings, by Joel Cauchi, killing six people
- 2024 Wakeley church stabbing, at a church two days after the Bondi Junction stabbings
