= Bondi massacre =

Bondi massacre could refer to:

- The Bondi Beach shooting in 2025
- The Bondi Junction stabbings in 2024
