= Scentre Group =

Australian shopping centre company

Scentre Group Limited
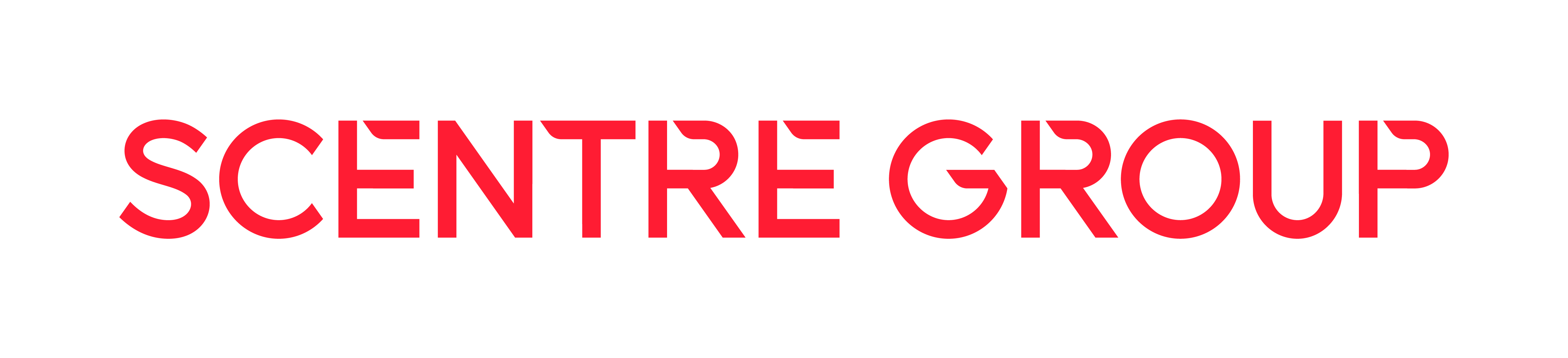
- Type: Public
- Traded as: ASX: SCG
- Industry: Real estate development Shopping centre management
- Predecessor: Westfield Group
- Founded: 2014; 12 years ago (as a spin off from Westfield Development Corporation founded 1960), listed on the Sydney Stock Exchange)
- Headquarters: 85 Castlereagh Street, Sydney, Australia
- Area served: Australia; New Zealand
- Key people: Ilana Atlas (Chair); Elliott Rusanow (CEO)
- Revenue: ▲ A$2,685.0 million (2025)
- Net income: ▲ A$1,795.2 million (2025)
- Total assets: A$1,898.6 million (2025)
- Number of employees: 2,964 (2024)
- Website: www.scentregroup.com

Scentre Group Limited is a shopping centre company with retail destinations operating under the Westfield brand in Australia and New Zealand. The corporation undertakes ownership, development, design, construction, funds/asset management, property management, leasing, and marketing activities for its centres. The group was created in June 2014 when the Westfield Group separated its American and European businesses from its operations in Australia and New Zealand. The company is listed on the Australian Securities Exchange and had a shopping centre portfolio that includes investment interests in 42 shopping centres across Australia and New Zealand in 2019, encompassing around 12,544 retail outlets and total assets under management in excess of A$39.4 billion in 2015.

== History ==
Scentre Group has origins in the western suburbs of Sydney. The first development was named "Westfield Place", and opened in July 1959 in Blacktown. The name Westfield is derived from "west" related to the West-Sydney location, and "field" due to having located on subdivided farmland. John Saunders and Frank Lowy opened the centre.

The company was floated on the Australian Stock Exchange in 1960 and built another five centres in New South Wales before expanding into Victoria and Queensland in 1966–67.

The expansion into the United States began with the purchase of Trumbull Shopping Park in Connecticut in 1977, and was followed by three centres in California, Michigan, and Connecticut in 1980 and three centres in California, New Jersey and Long Island, New York in 1986. In 1994, Westfield joined together with General Growth and Whitehall Real Estate to purchase 19 centres for US$1 billion. The company built considerable holdings on the east coast and in California before expanding in the Mid-West. By 2005, the company owned centres in 15 US states.

In the 1990s, Westfield began a major expansion to New Zealand, where it mostly bought existing shopping centres of the Fletchers Company, and progressively rebranded them. Only in 2007, with Westfield Albany, did the company open a fully new centre in the country.

On 9 May 2006, Westfield announced the sale of eight United States shopping centres which it deemed to fit outside its strategic plan, to Centro Properties Group.

In April 2012, it was announced that Westfield Group would sell seven 'non-core' property assets to Starwood Capital Group for A$1 billion and one other property to an undisclosed buyer for A$147 million. The funds would be used to repay debt and invest in businesses offering higher return. The sales were expected completed by November 2013.

In June 2014, Westfield Group, one of the world's largest shopping centre companies, restructured to create two, new independent companies: Scentre Group and Westfield Corporation. Scentre Group was created to own and manage the company's interests in Australia and New Zealand. Westfield Corporation owns and manages Westfield shopping centres in the United States, United Kingdom, and Europe. Although Westfield Group has evolved into two separate companies, the consumer branding remained the same for Scentre Group's shopping centre portfolio.

In October 2015, Frank Lowy stepped down as the chairman of Scentre Group following 55 years in charge.

Footfall at the group's shopping centres rose 9.8% to 314 million in 2023 in the first half of the year after adding new entertainment in collaboration with Disney and Netball Australia. Centres are 99% occupied, with 1,576 new leases signed in the half year.

On the afternoon of 13 April 2024, a man entered Westfield Bondi Junction in Sydney and stabbed at least 18 people, killing 5 female patrons and a male centre security guard. The incident sent the centre into lockdown and shoppers to take cover in stores. A lone police officer arrived and fatally shot the perpetrator.

The company's figures for 2023: operating funds (FFO) of $1,094.2 million and profit of $174.9 million. The group's portfolio is valued at $34.3bn and partner sales totalled a record $28.4bn (up 6.4% on 2022).

== Current operations ==
Scentre Group currently has interests in total assets worth A$38.6 billion, owning 42 shopping centres in Australia and New Zealand − with over 3.8 million square metres of retail space.

=== Australia ===
Having been established in Australia, with its original premises being at Blacktown, the Scentre Group continues to operate a large number of shopping centres in Australia under the Westfield brand.

=== New Zealand ===
Westfield entered the New Zealand market in 1997 and acquired an interest in the St. Lukes Group portfolio in 1998. Westfield malls are by far the most numerous chain in New Zealand, with most of its centres located in Auckland, including their largest development located in Albany. As of February 2017, Westfield had NZ$2.5 billion in assets under management in New Zealand.

In mid-2012, Westfield sold its 50% share of Westfield Shore City in Takapuna on Auckland's North Shore, now known as Shore City Shopping Centre. Later that same year the company sold Westfield Downtown and Westfield Pakuranga, now known as Pakuranga Plaza.

In 2014, Scentre sold 49% of five properties to the Singapore Government's GIC Private Limited. The properties are Albany, Manukau, Newmarket and St Lukes in Auckland, and Riccarton in Christchurch.

In 2015, two more Westfield centres sold by Scentre Group were Chartwell Shopping Centre (formerly Westfield Chartwell) and Queensgate Shopping Centre (formerly Westfield Queensgate).

In February 2017, it was announced that Scentre Group had sold Westfield WestCity in Henderson, Auckland, to the family-owned Australian business Angaet Group for A$147 million.

== Gallery ==
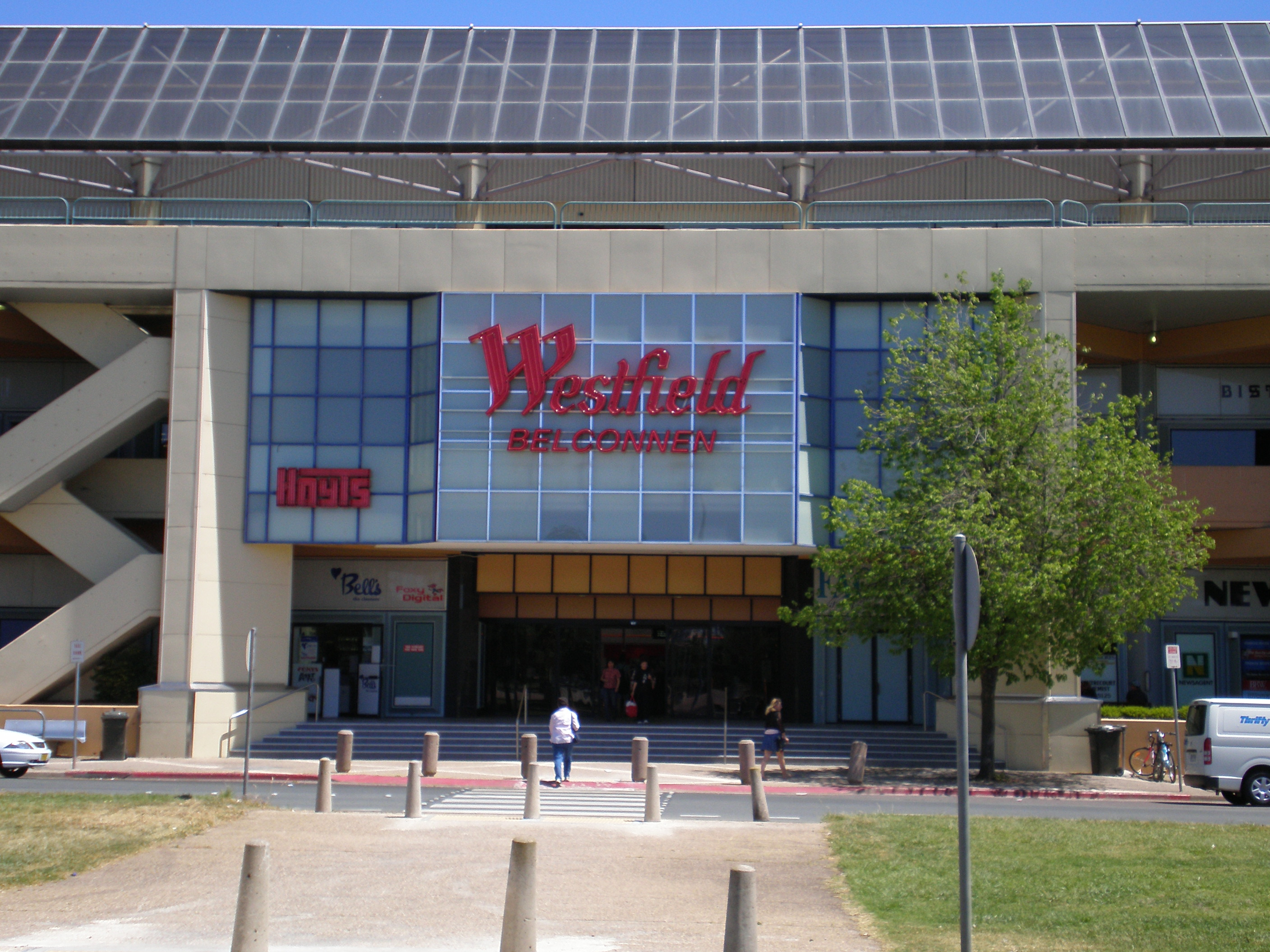
Westfield Belconnen, Canberra

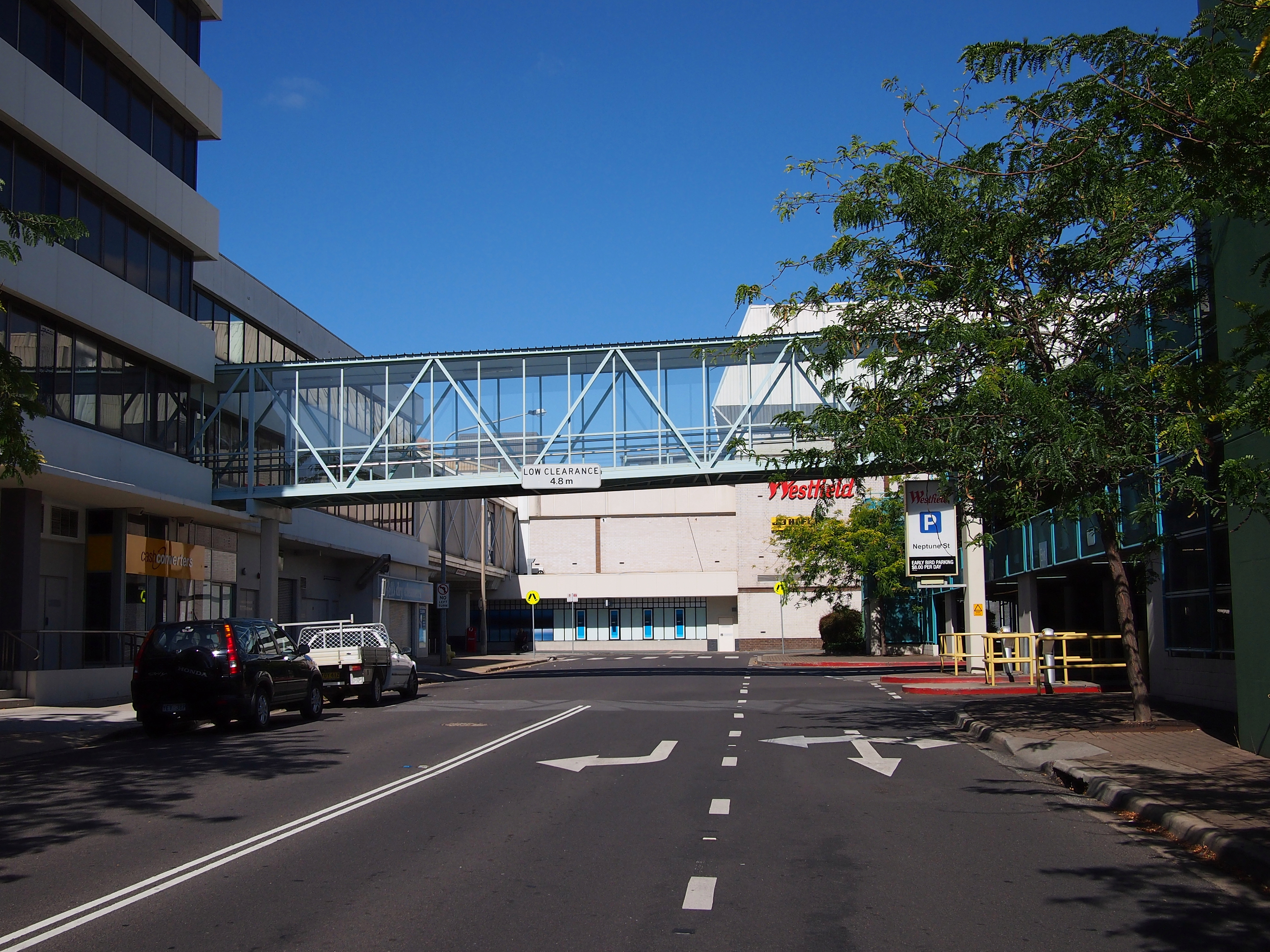
Westfield Woden, Canberra

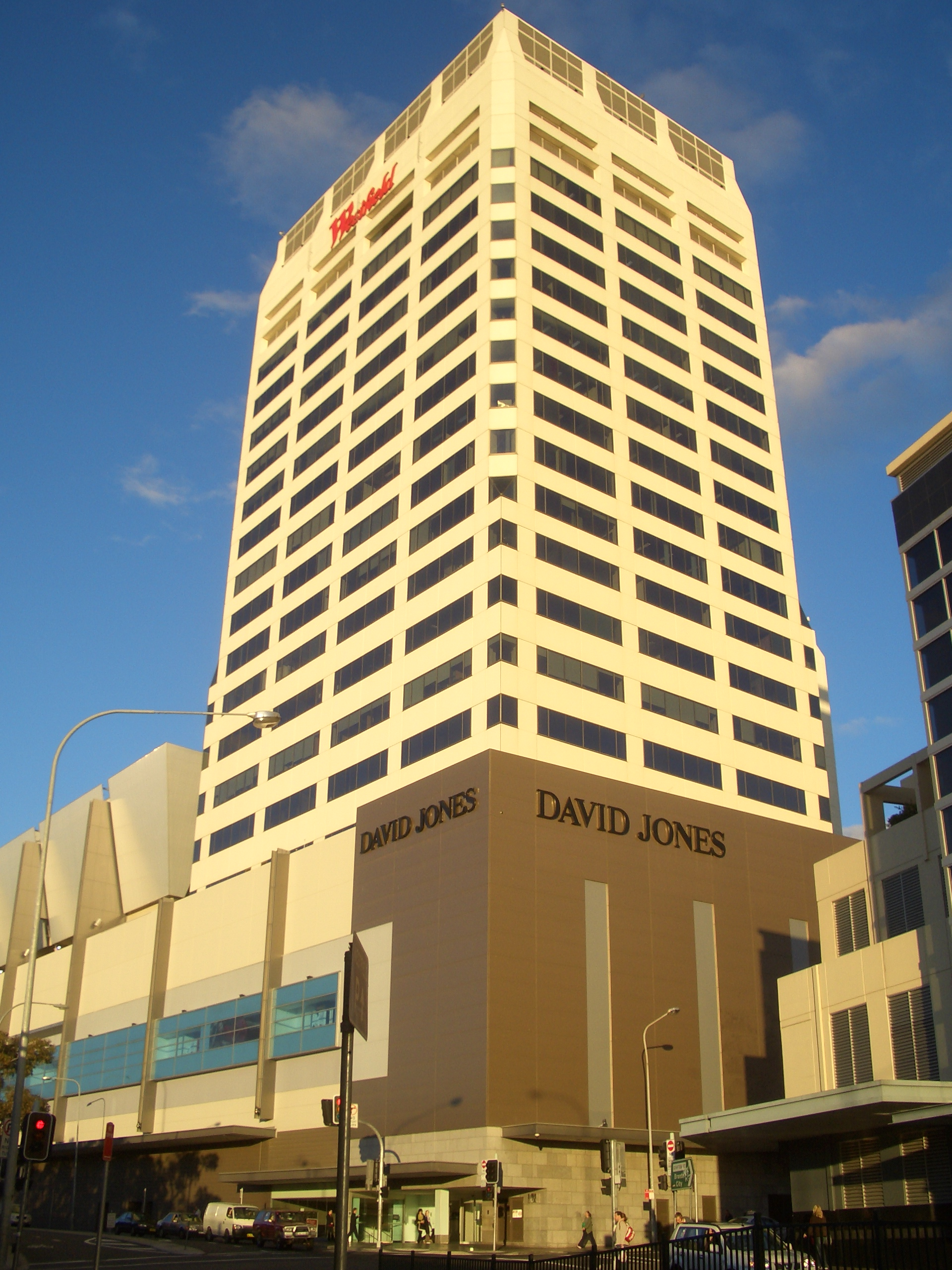
Westfield Bondi Junction, Sydney

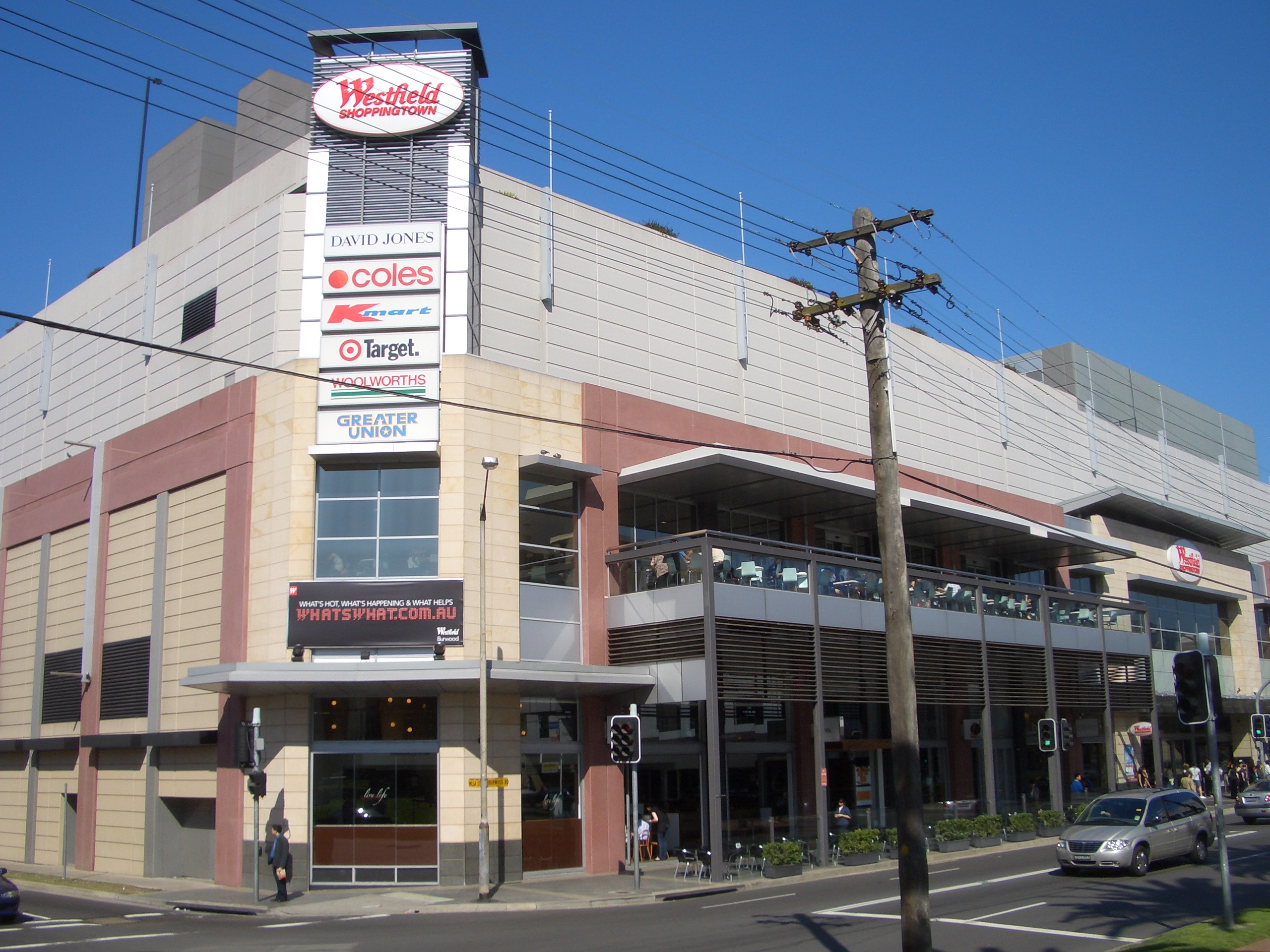
Westfield Burwood, Sydney

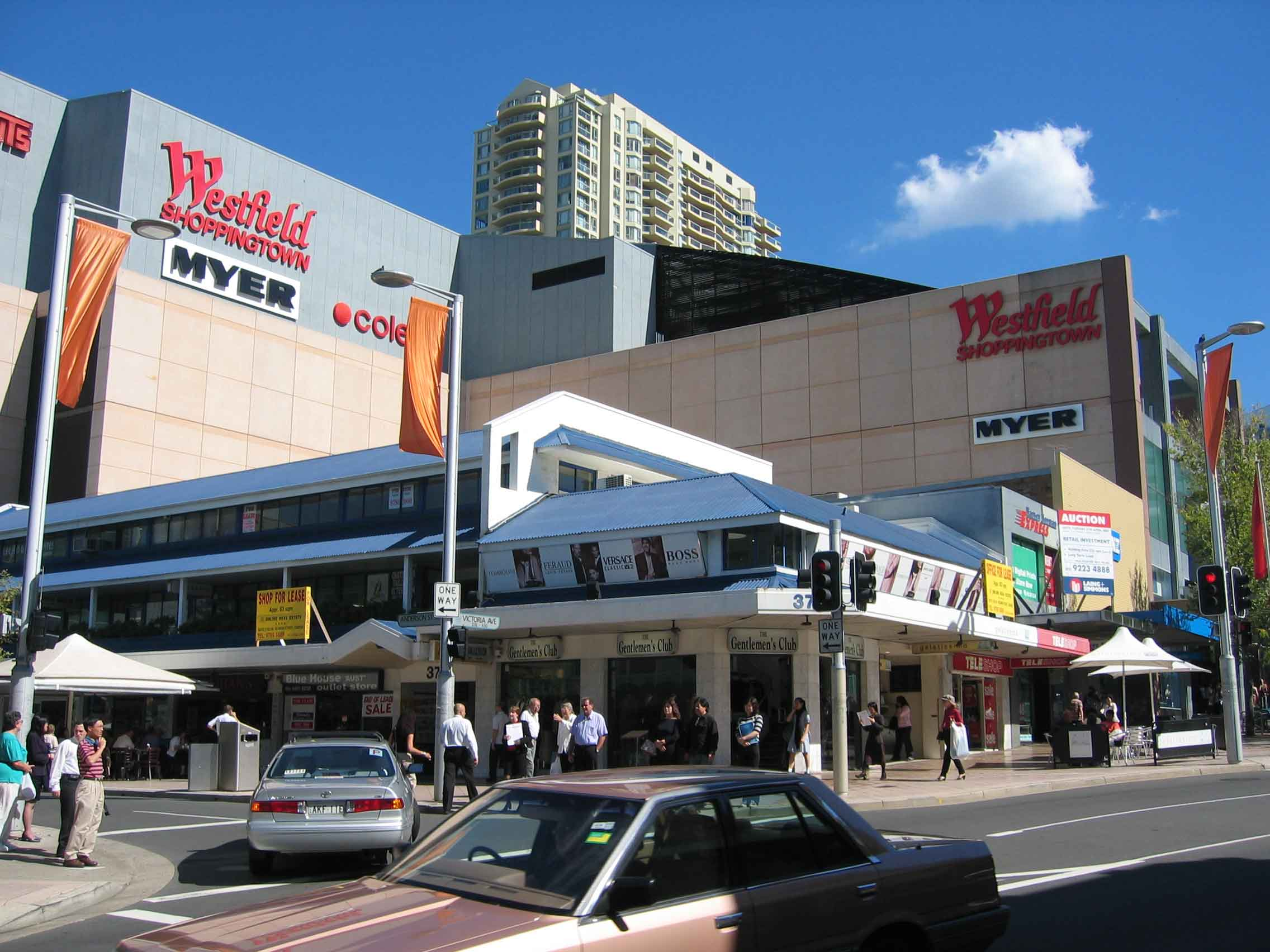
Westfield Chatswood, Sydney

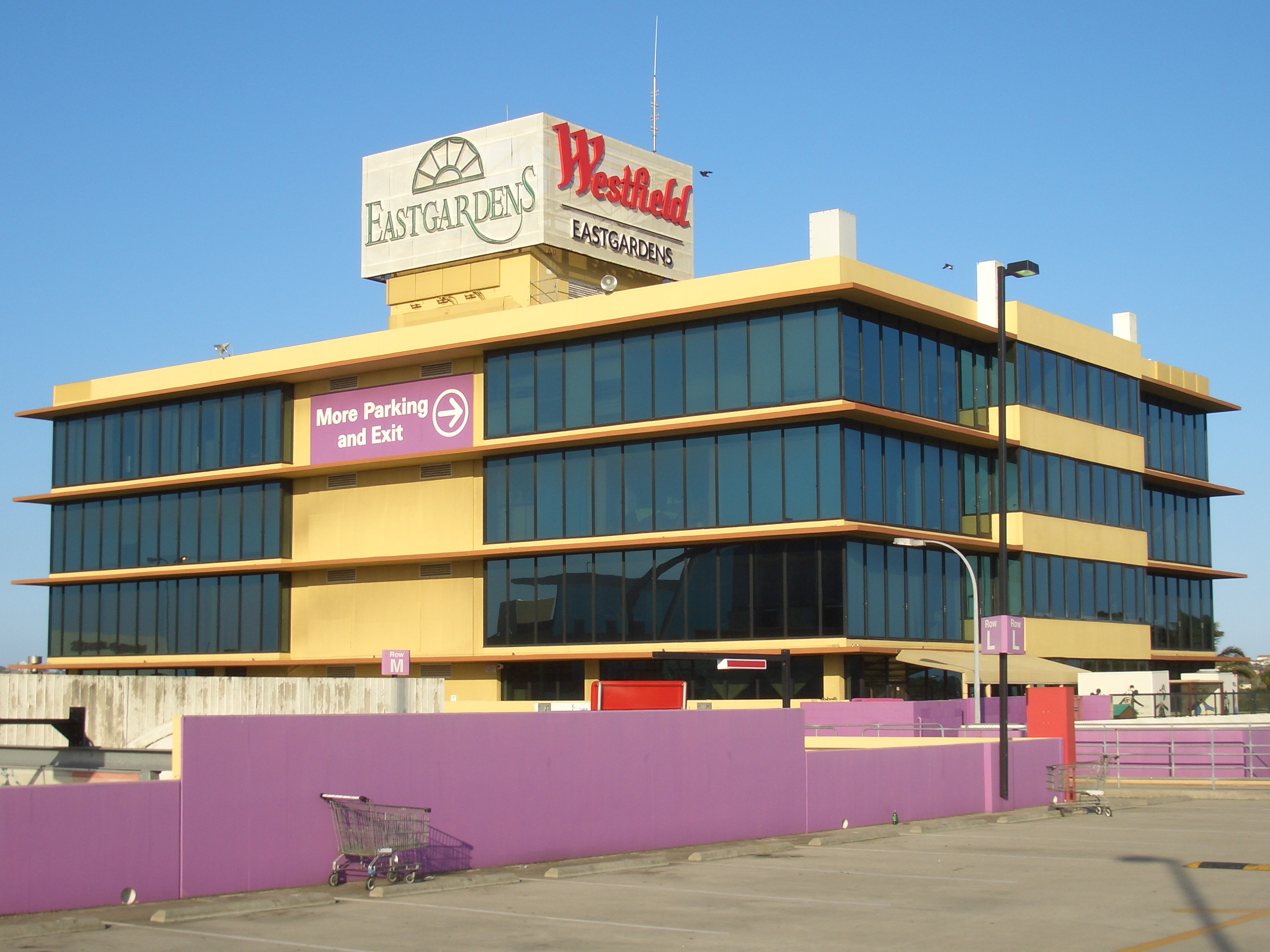
Westfield Eastgardens, Sydney

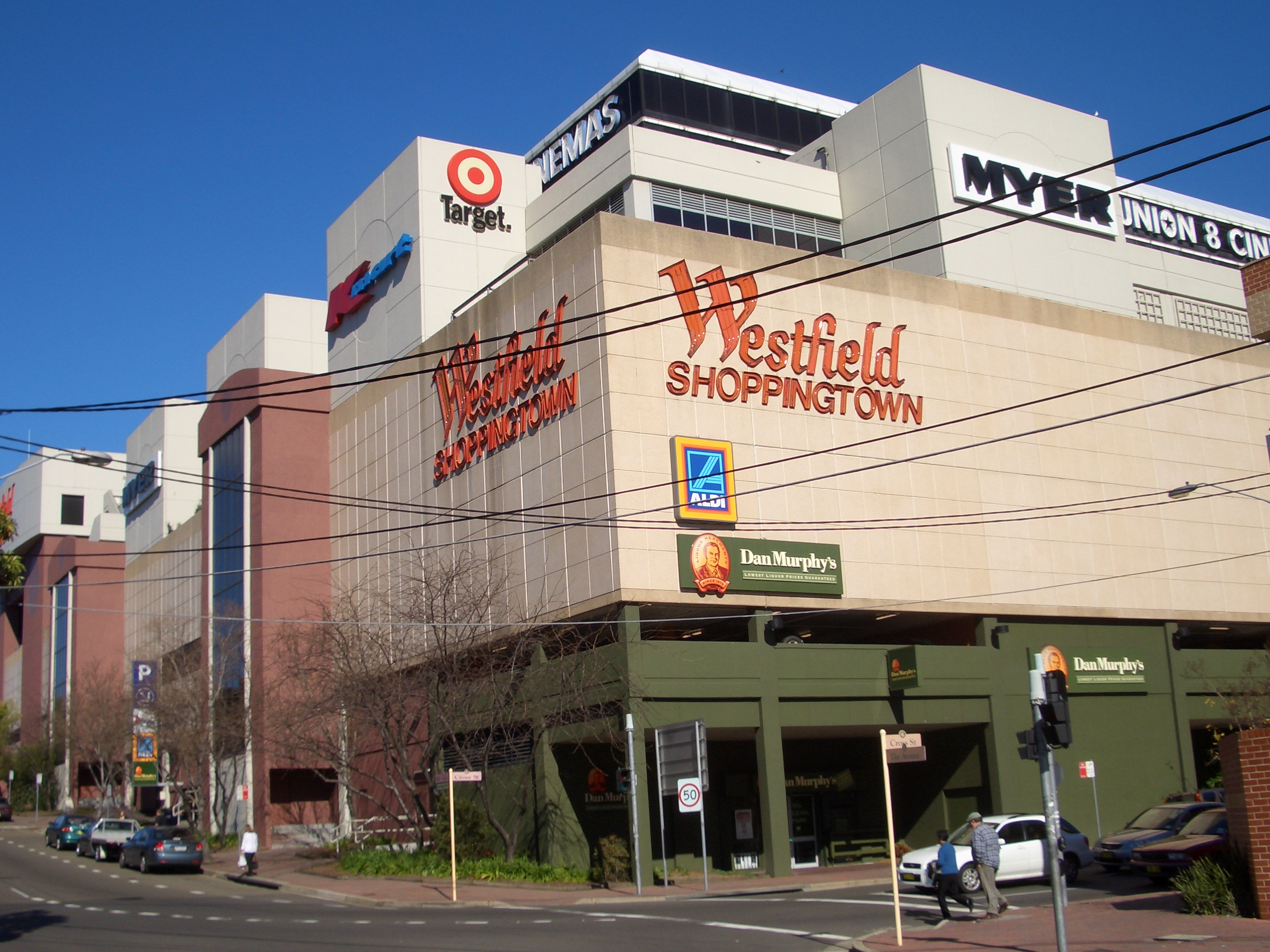
Westfield Hurstville, Sydney

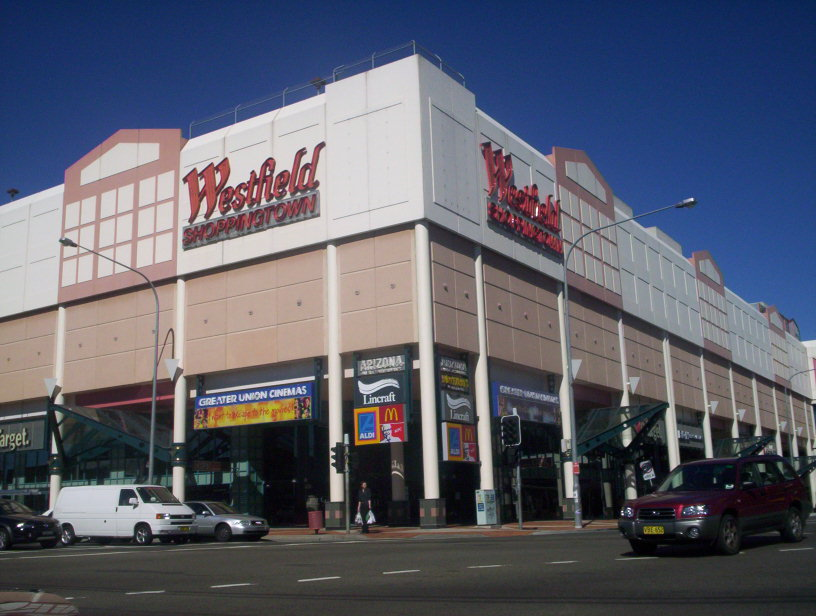
Westfield Miranda, Sydney

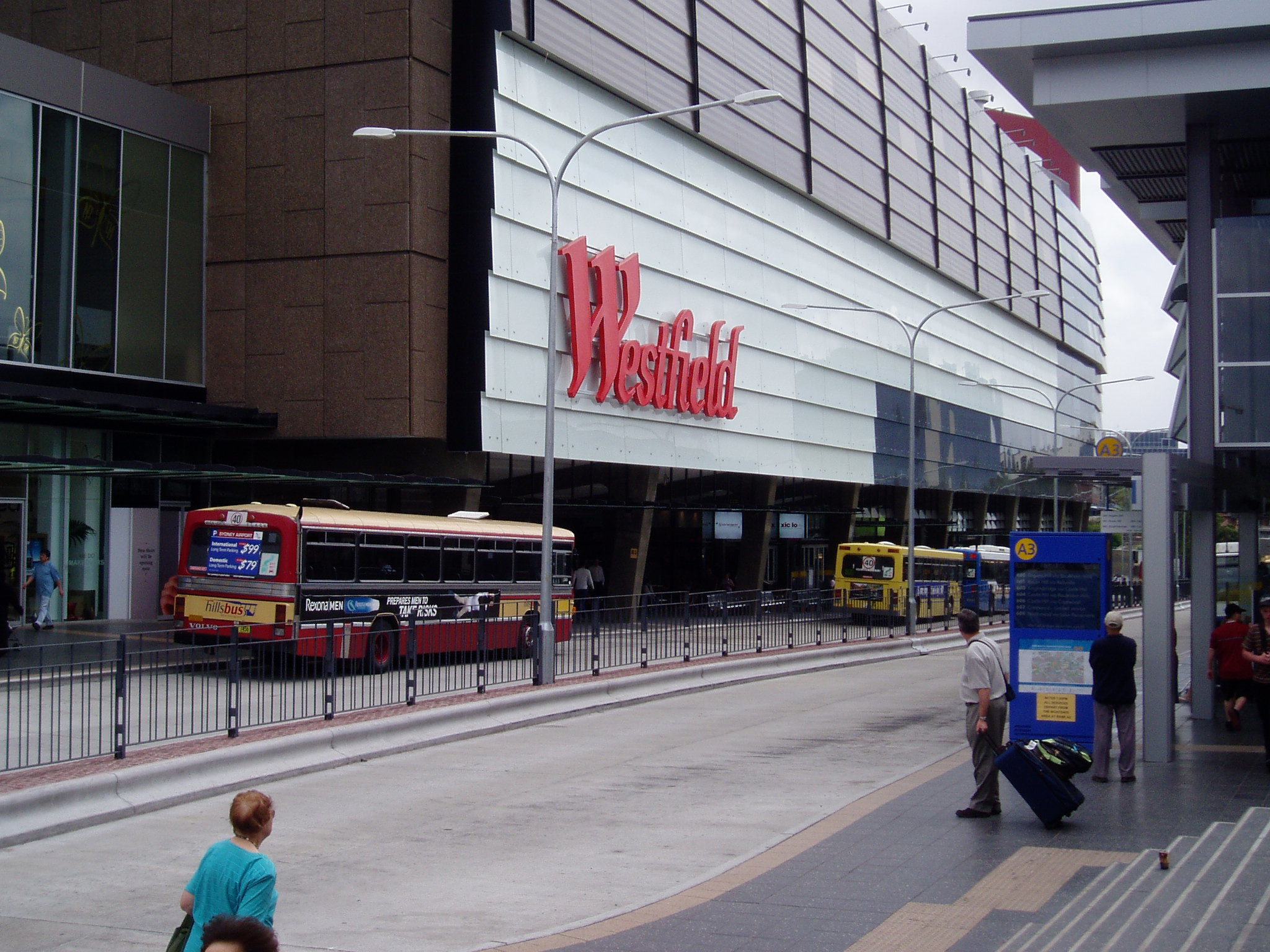
Westfield Parramatta, Sydney

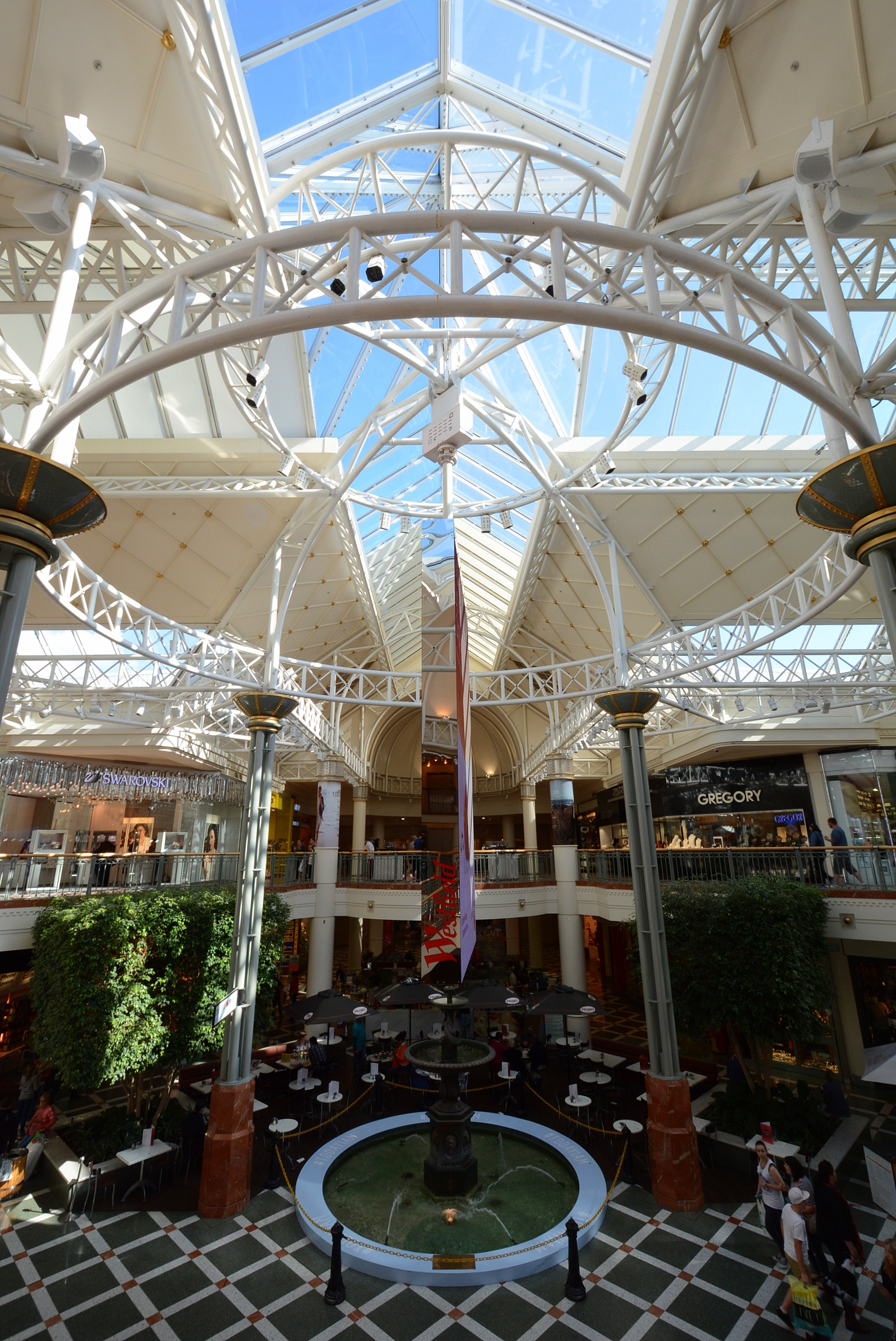
Westfield Penrith, Sydney

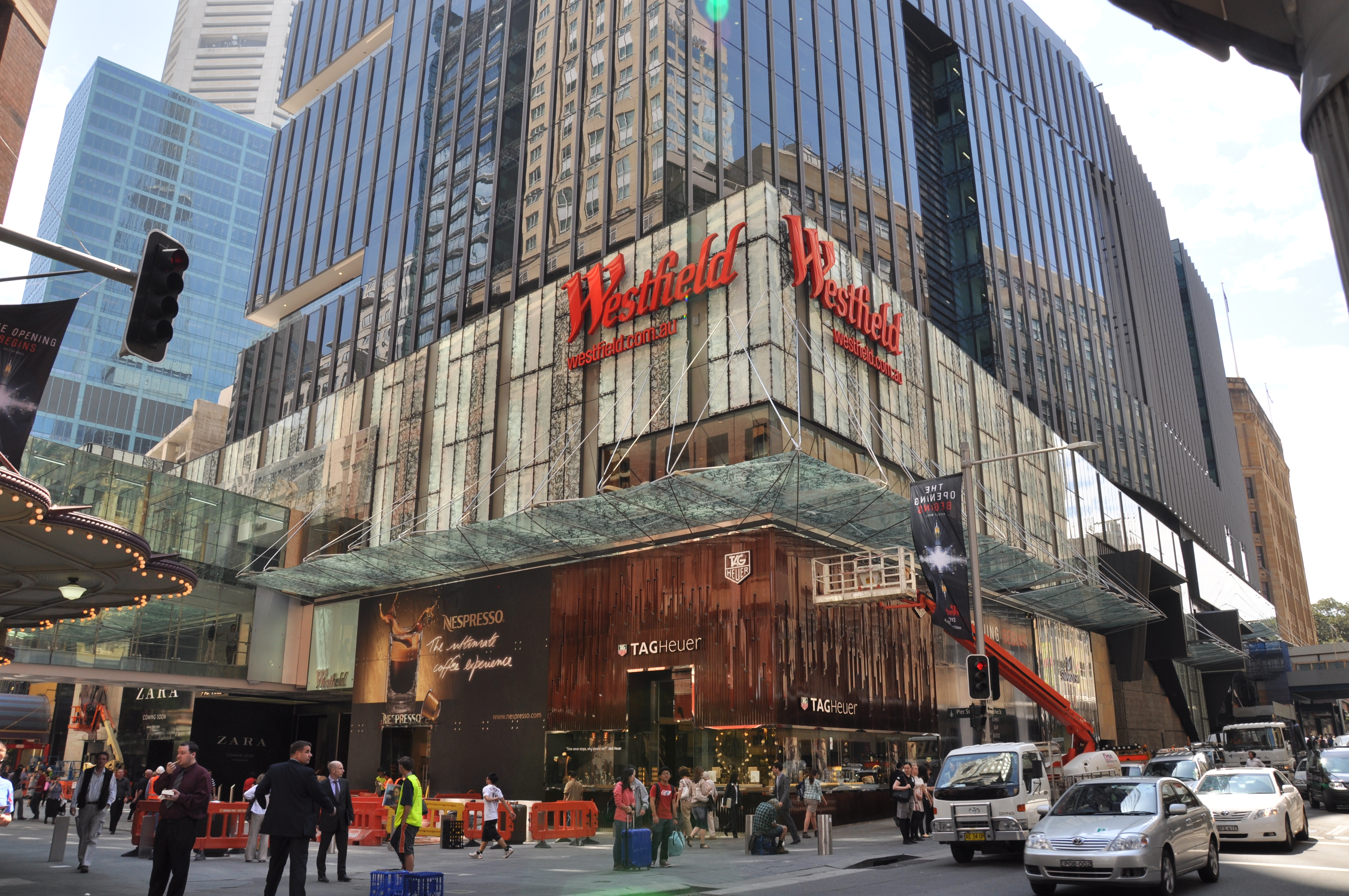
Westfield Sydney

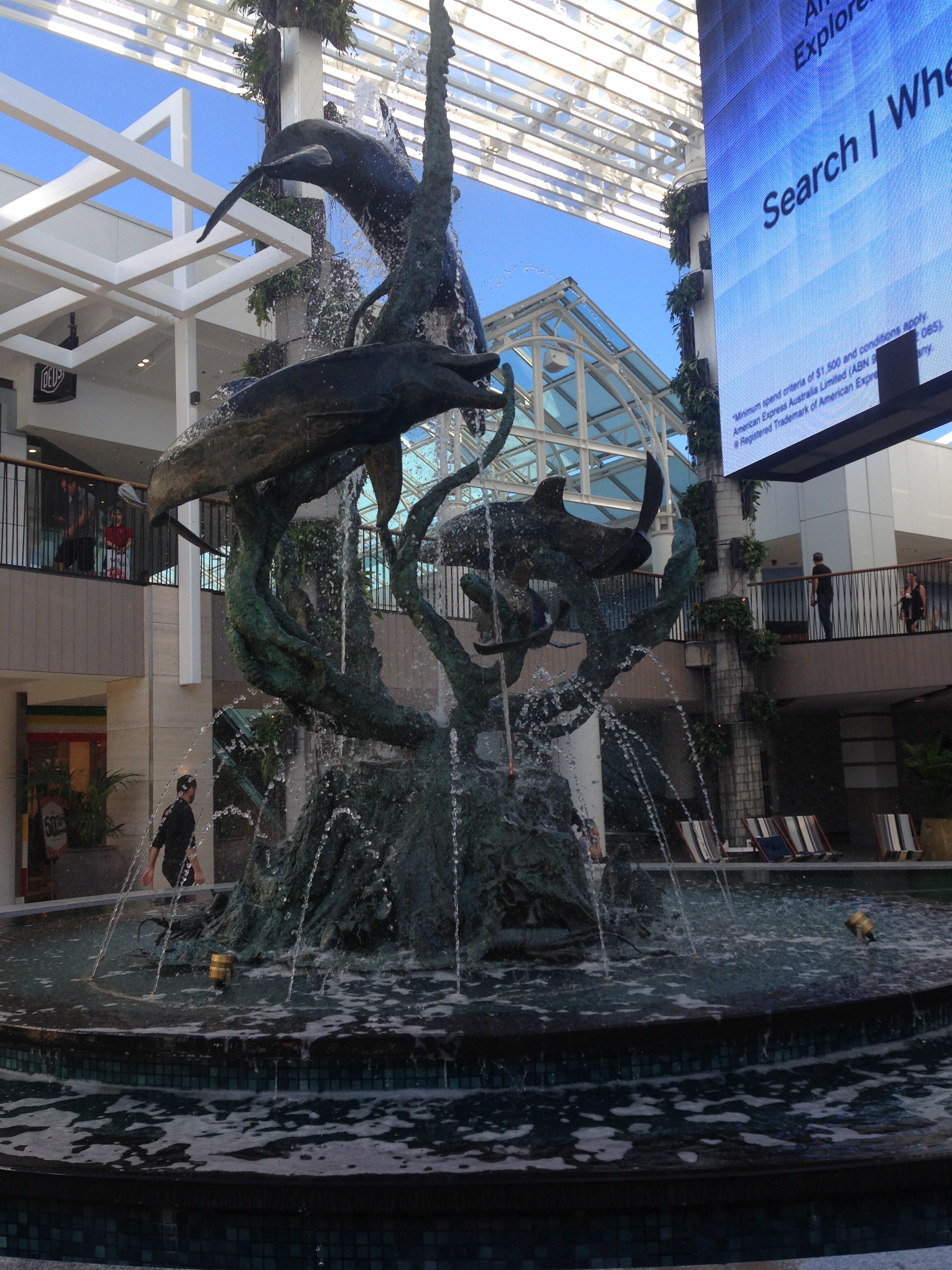
Westfield Warringah Mall, Sydney

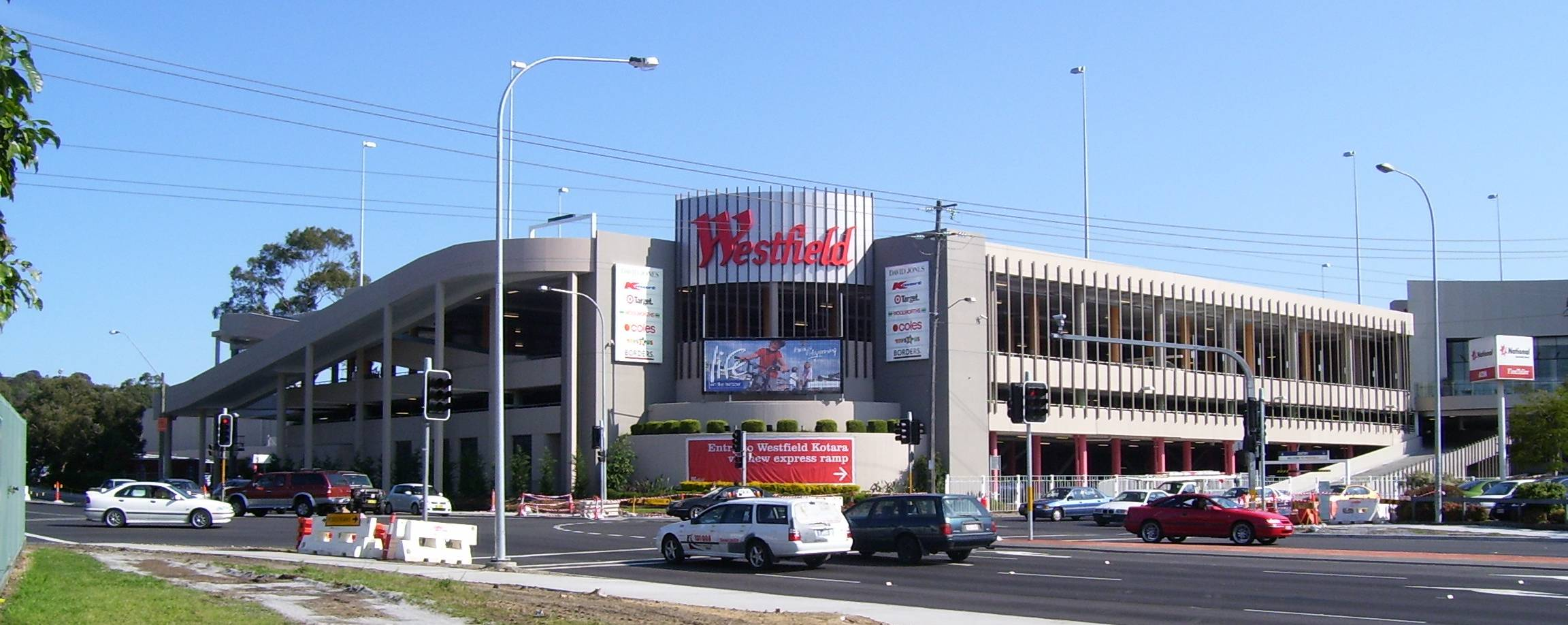
Westfield Kotara, Newcastle

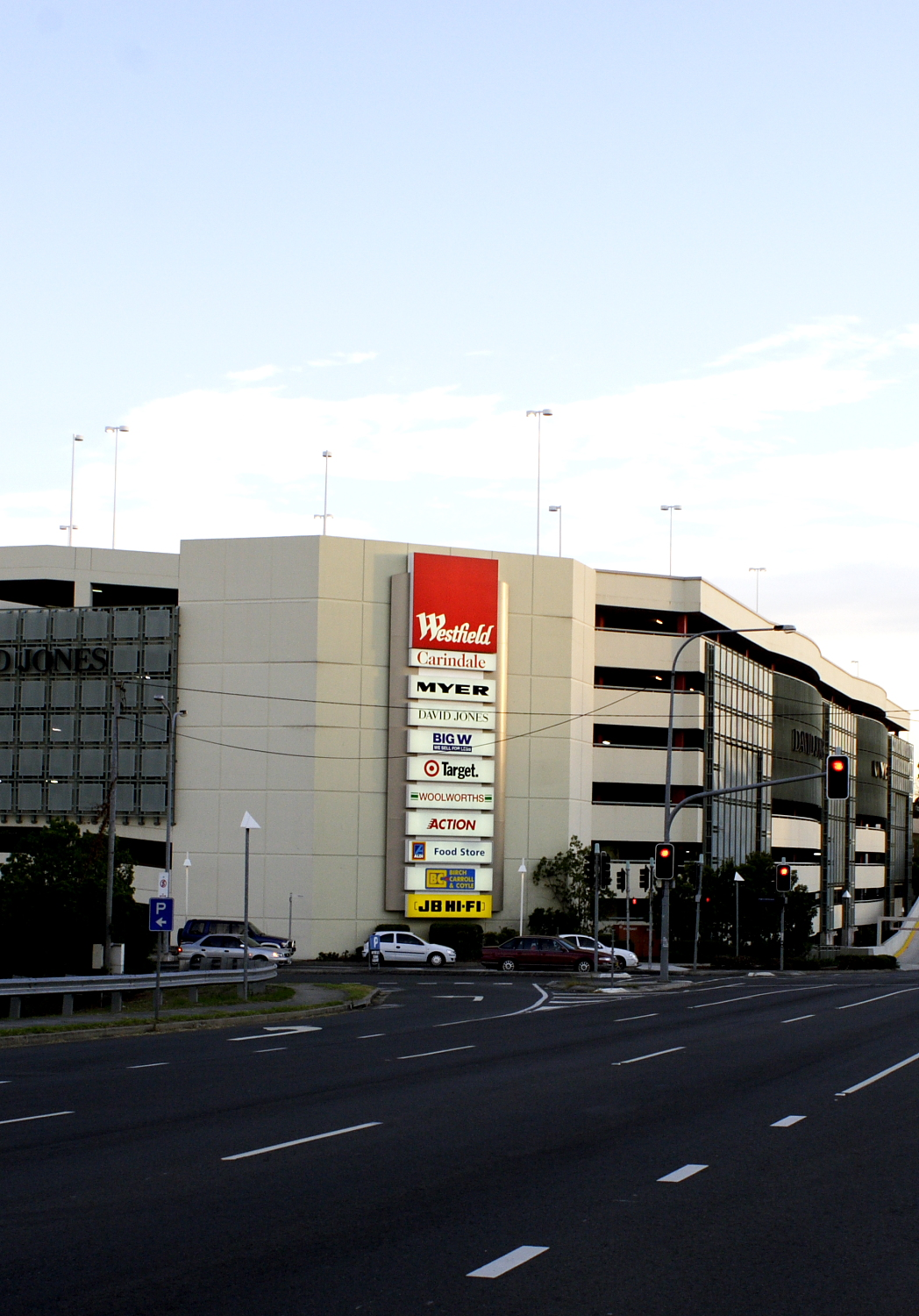
Westfield Carindale, Brisbane

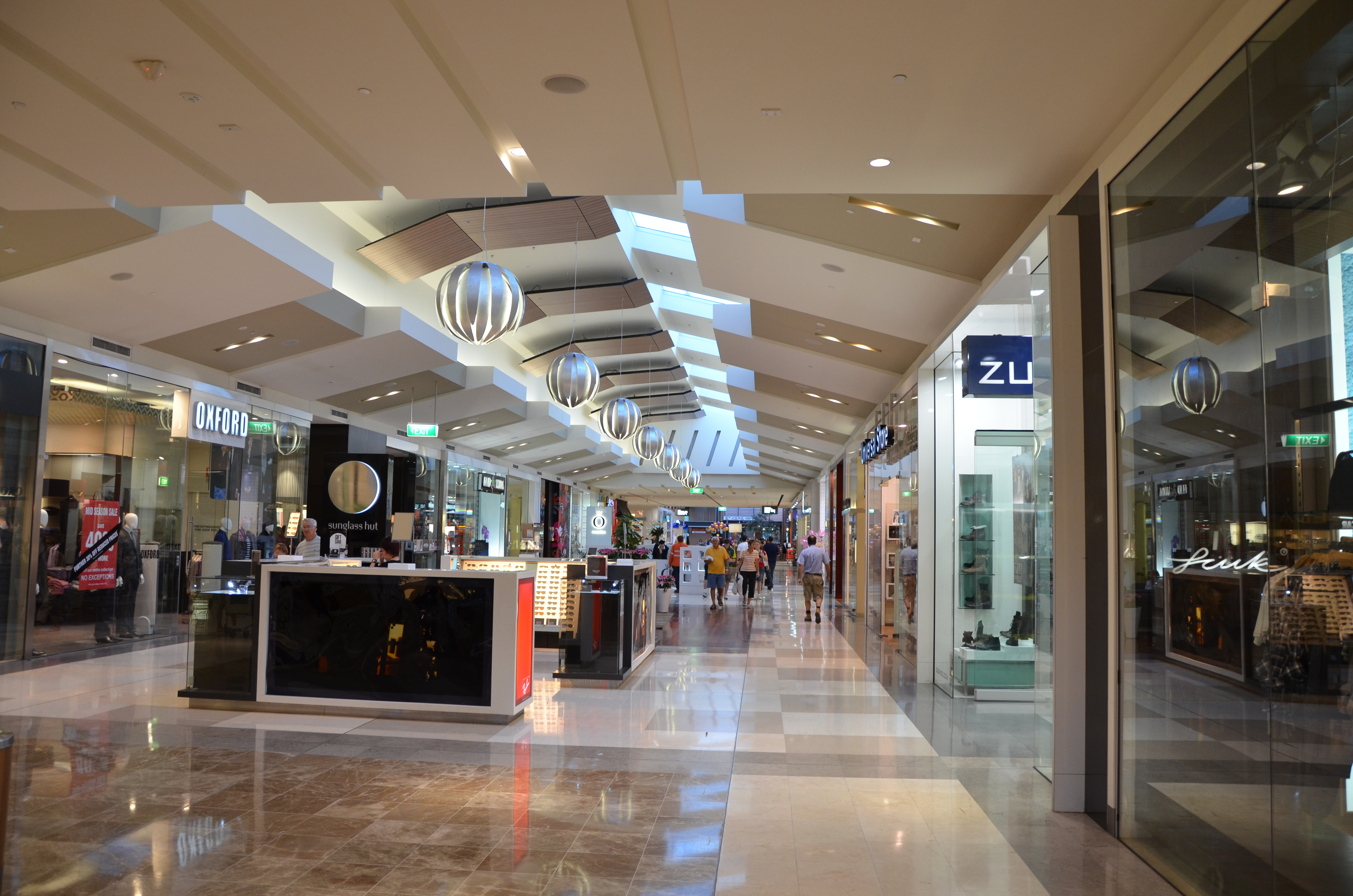
Westfield Chermside, Brisbane

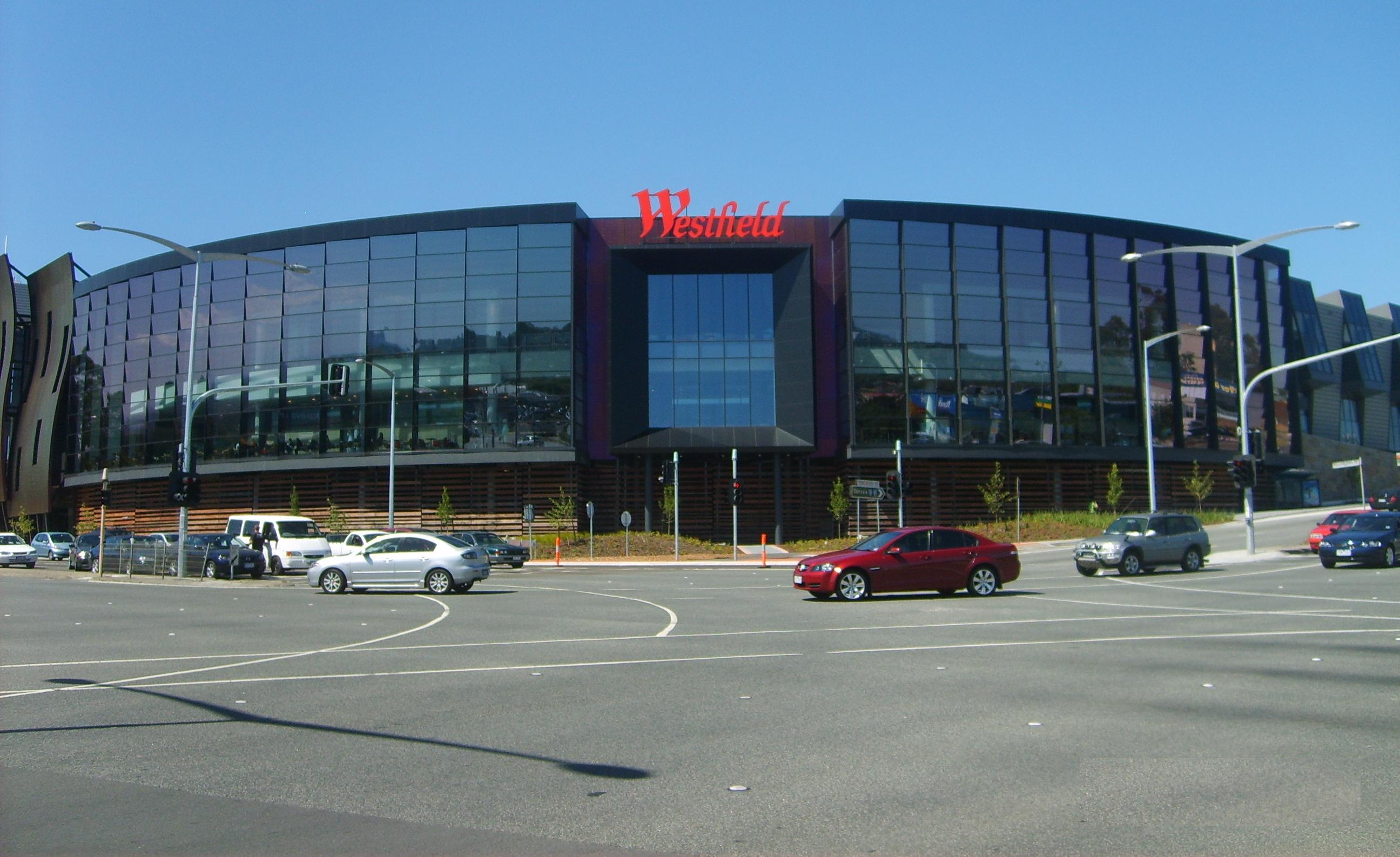
Westfield Doncaster, Melbourne

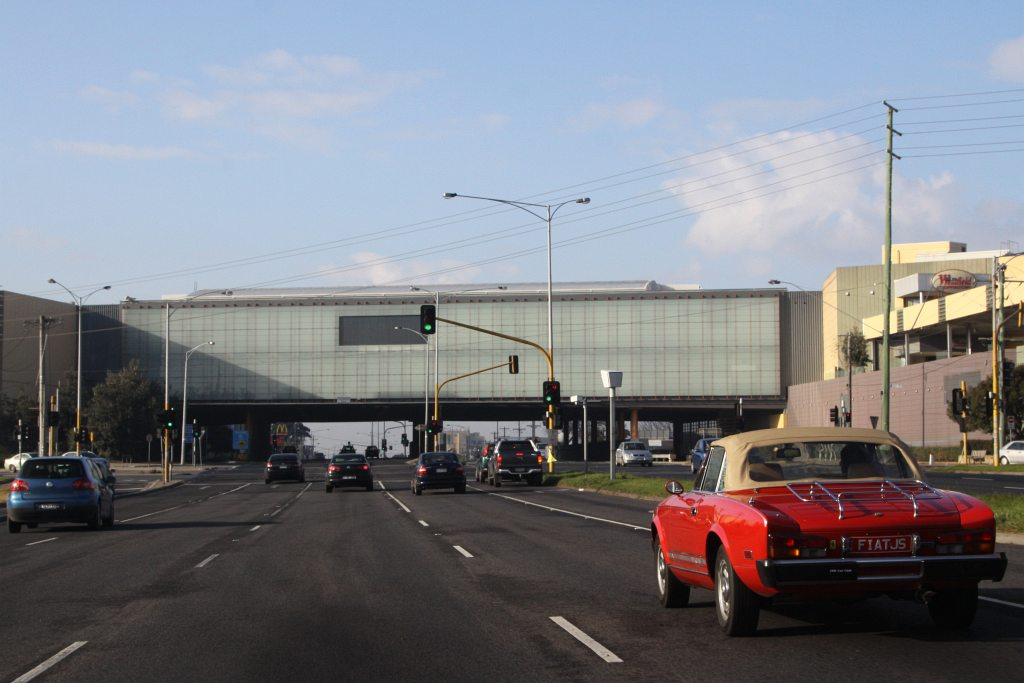
Westfield Southland, Melbourne

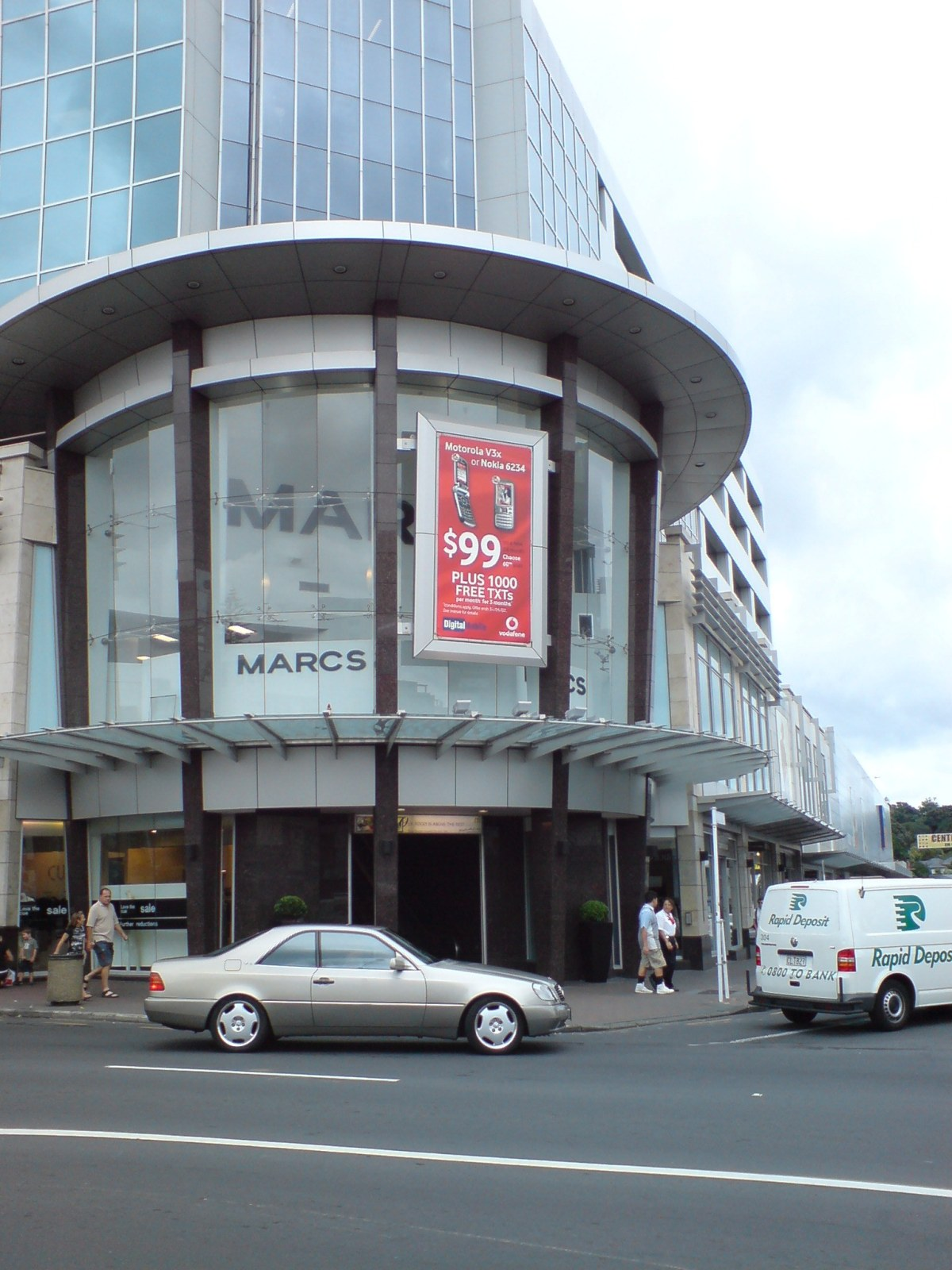
Westfield Newmarket, Auckland

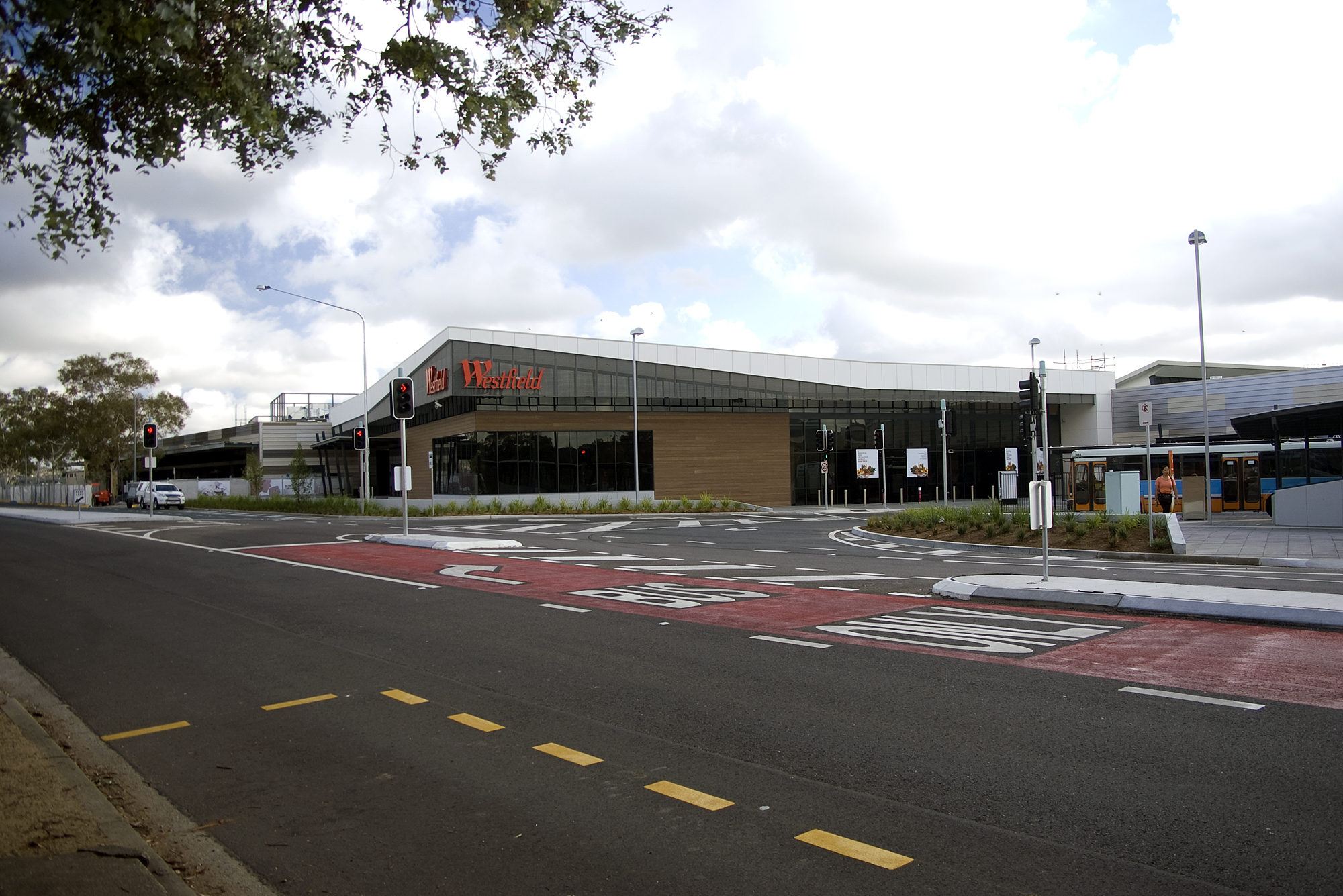
Westfield Belconnen, Canberra. Viewed from Lathlain Street.

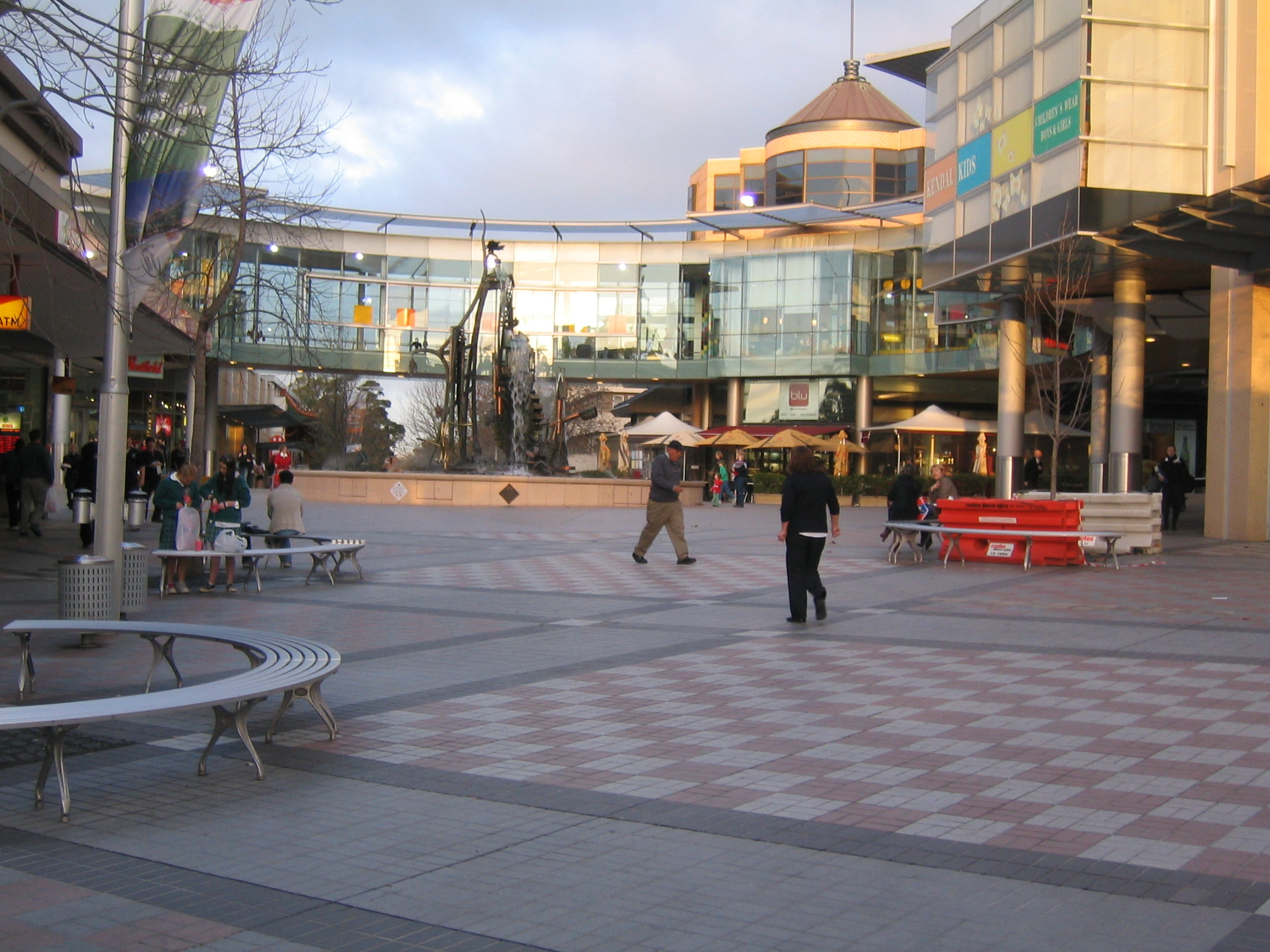
Westfield Hornsby, Sydney

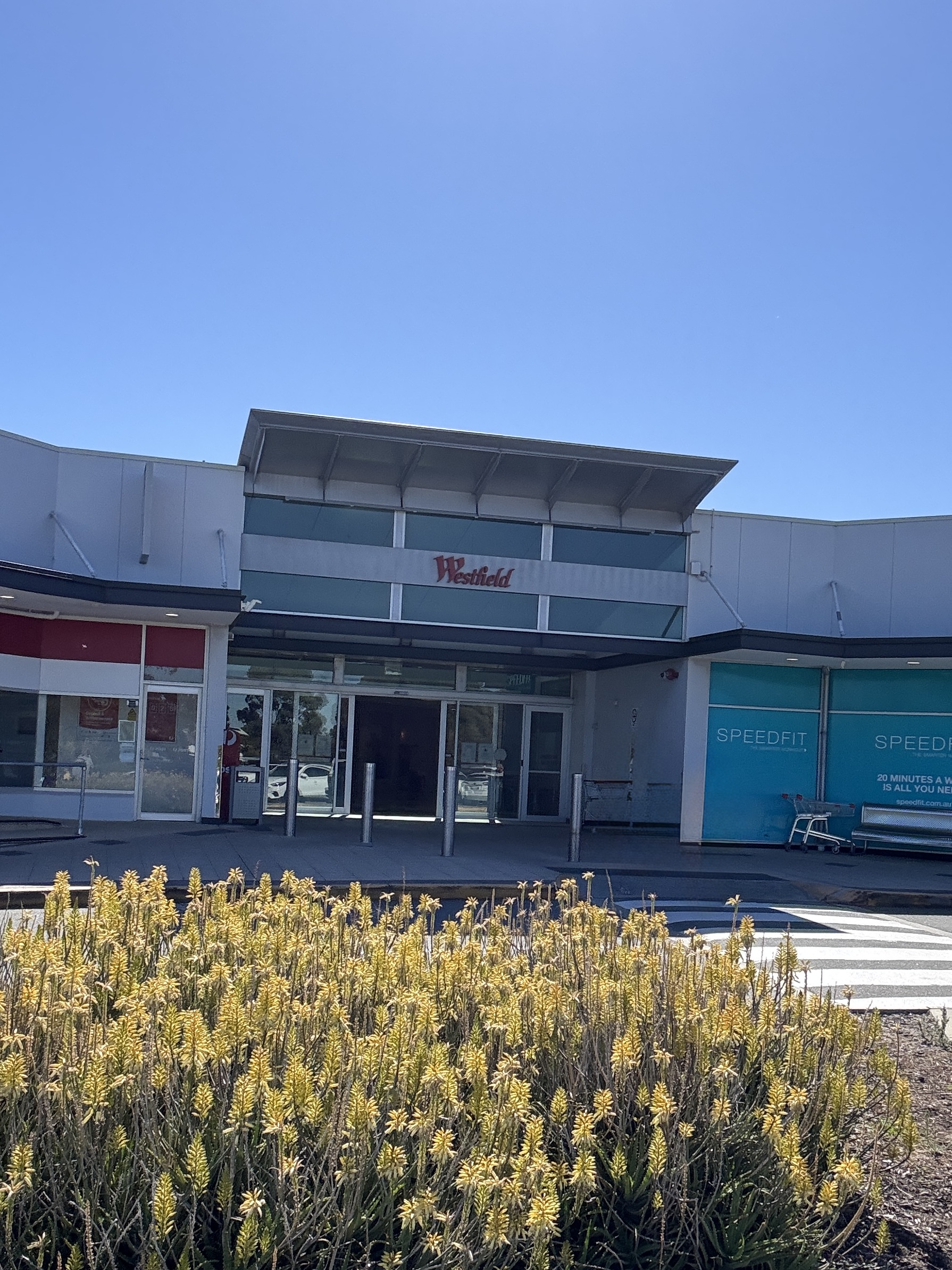
Westfield Whitford City, Perth
