= Kerry Good =

Australian rules footballer (born 1958)

Personal information
- Born: 10 November 1958 (age 67)
- Original team: Ulverstone (NWFU)
- Height: 184 cm (6 ft 0 in)
- Weight: 73 kg (161 lb)

Playing career^{1}
Years	Club	Games (Goals)
1977–1983	North Melbourne	74 (150)
- ^{1} Playing statistics correct to the end of 1983.

Kerry Good (born 10 November 1958) is a former Australian rules footballer who played with North Melbourne in the VFL during the late 1970s and early 1980s.

Good was a forward and kicked 49 goals in the 1981 VFL season, including a career best ten goals against Melbourne in round 20. He is best remembered for kicking a controversial, after the siren, goal to win North Melbourne the 1980 Escort Championships Grand Final (also known as the Night Series). North Melbourne was playing Collingwood at VFL Park in the decider and Good marked a kick from Malcolm Blight at centre half-forward but the siren had sounded before the ball had reached him – but the umpire had not heard the siren, so Good was allowed to take his kick and goaled to give his side a three-point win.

After finishing his VFL football playing career, Good returned to Tasmania, playing in Ulverstone's 1986 premiership win. He has been inducted into the Tasmanian Football Hall of Fame.

Good was a director for the North Melbourne Football Club in the 1990s. In 2024, Good's daughter Ashlee was one of the victims killed in the Bondi Junction stabbings.
