= Bondi Junction stabbings =

2024 stabbing attack in Sydney, New South Wales, Australia

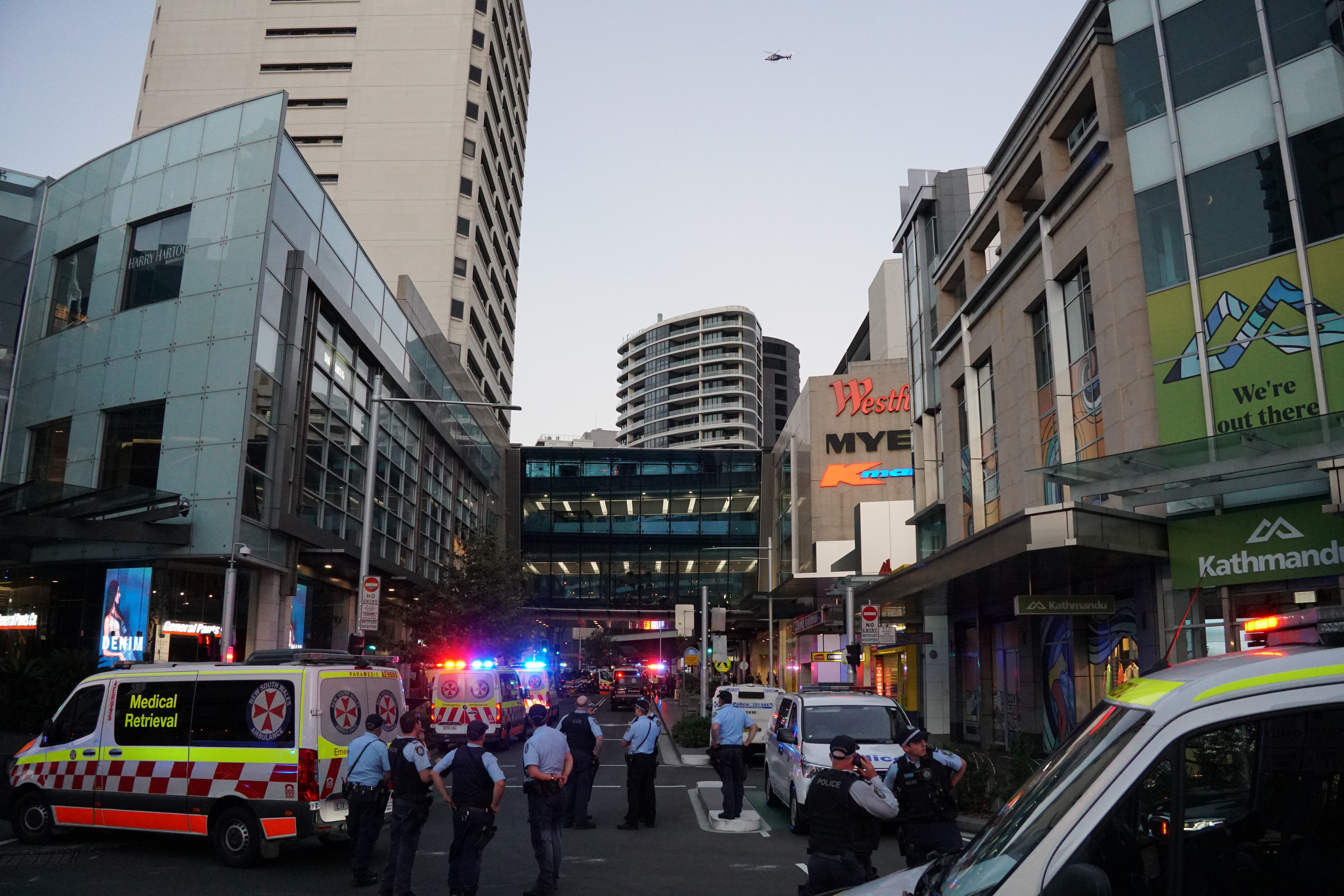
- Police and paramedics outside the shopping centre
- Map indicating the location of the incident
- Location: 33°53′29″S 151°15′04″E; Bondi Junction, Sydney, New South Wales, Australia
- Date: 13 April 2024; 3:32 pm – 3:38 pm (AEST, UTC+10:00)
- Target: Shoppers at Westfield Bondi Junction, New South Wales Police
- Attack type: Mass stabbing
- Weapon: Ka-Bar knife
- Deaths: 7 (including the perpetrator)
- Injuries: 12 (10 by stabbing)
- Perpetrator: Joel Cauchi
- Defender: Police Inspector Amy Scott
- Motive: Unknown; experiencing a psychotic episode at the time

On 13 April 2024, a mass stabbing occurred at the Westfield Bondi Junction shopping centre in the eastern suburbs of Sydney, New South Wales, Australia. Six people were killed and twelve were injured, including a nine-month-old infant before the perpetrator, 40-year-old Joel Cauchi, was fatally shot by an NSW Police Inspector after he ran at her with a knife in hand.

Although media noted that the majority of casualties were female, an inquest by the Coroner's Court of New South Wales denied a misogynistic motive and said the killings were committed without specific targets while Cauchi was in a state of psychosis.

== Background ==
Westfield Bondi Junction is a major shopping centre in Sydney's eastern suburbs and is the fourth-largest shopping centre in New South Wales. The attack took place within a span of minutes on a Saturday afternoon when the area was filled with hundreds of visitors.

Authorities said that the perpetrator, Joel Cauchi, had visited two other Westfield outlets in the days leading to the attack. The night before the attack, he had slept rough at the beach in Maroubra, later picking up his backpack and knife from a storage locker in the Sydney city centre. Afterwards, he made online searches for "accounts of the Columbine school shooting" on Reddit before travelling towards Bondi Junction.

== Attack ==
Cauchi first entered the centre at 12:17 pm on 13 April 2024 and walked around until around 1:15 pm, upon which he left and traveled to Bondi Beach via bus. He returned to the centre at 2:48 pm, purchasing food and drinks before wandering around the centre. He left again at 3:22 pm with what onlookers described as a 30-centimetre (12 in) knife, first concealed in his backpack.

At 3:32 pm, while standing in line at the Sourdough Bakery, Cauchi pulled the knife from his backpack and fatally stabbed Dawn Singleton, who was in front of him. He then moved south and killed Jade Young near the bakery at 3:33:01 pm. He tried to attack a woman outside an AJE Athletica store but merely scratched her. At 3:33:18 pm, Cauchi fatally stabbed Cheng Yixuan outside a Peter Alexander fashion store. He then stabbed a woman outside a Cotton On retailer and another outside a Lululemon clothing store though both victims ultimately survived.

At 3:33:28 pm, two security guards, Muhammad Taha and Faraz Tahir, noticed an attack was happening and decided to report it. They walked towards the Sourdough Bakery and the centre's air bridge. At around the same time, Cauchi attacked another woman outside Kookai; she too survived. He briefly entered the Myer store, where he stabbed another woman; she also survived. At 3:34 pm, he ran from the store and stabbed Ashlee Good outside AJE Athletica. As Good staggered away, Cauchi started to stab her nine-month-old daughter. Good ran back and tried to fight him, but he stabbed her again, killing her. Cauchi subsequently left, with Good's daughter surviving heavy injuries. At 3:34:26 pm, Cauchi ran back past Sourdough Bakery and stabbed both Taha and Tahir, killing the latter. He then continued running north, stabbing two women; both again survived. At 3:34:51 pm, he fatally stabbed Pikria Darchia outside a Chanel Boutique. Following this, Cauchi moved down to the third floor and stabbed another woman at 3:35:40 pm, outside a Zimmermann store; the woman survived.

Cauchi ran around the third floor and tried to access the fourth floor via an escalator. Two Frenchmen, Damien Guerot and Silas Despreaux, rescued a woman on the escalator and tried to block him with bollards. Eventually, the two men threw their bollards at Cauchi and ran out of the mall. Cauchi moved up to the fourth floor and stayed near the escalator to the fifth floor outside a Zara store.

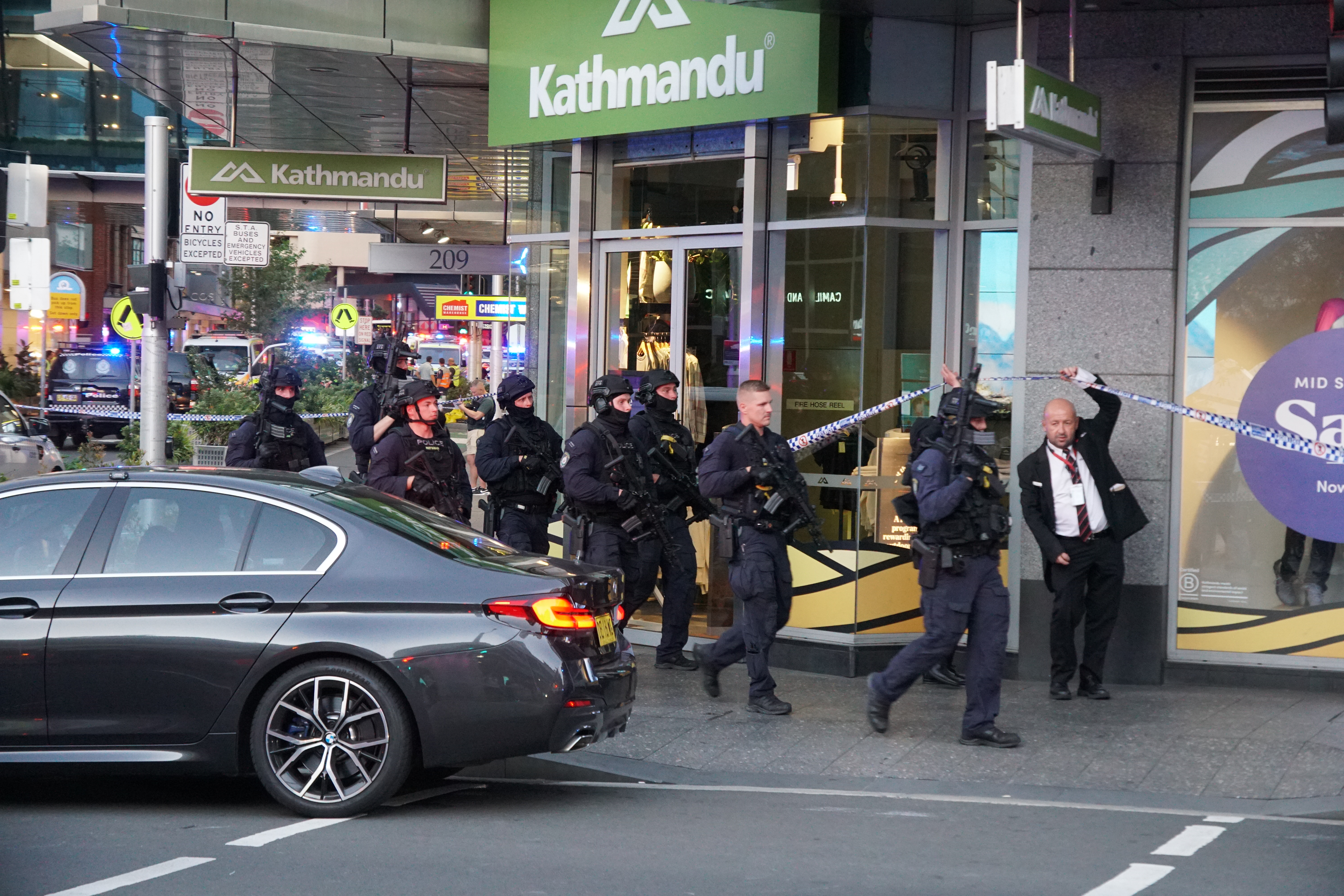
State Protection Group forces armed with M4 rifles entering the shopping centre to clear the complex

Emergency services were called following reports of multiple people being stabbed. Law enforcement had the building evacuated, and public transport around the area was rerouted. Around 40 New South Wales Ambulance resources were deployed to the scene.

Police officer Amy Scott, with the command staff at the four police stations that comprised the region, was on the road when her car's radio issued a "double-beep", meaning an urgent communication. The dispatcher requested any police car in the vicinity to go to Bondi Junction Westfield's immediately after receiving multiple calls of stabbings. Scott was already very close to the location; she acknowledged the job and activated her car's lights and siren. She arrived at the shopping centre at 3:37:21 pm as the first officer on the scene. She entered the centre on the fourth floor with Guerot and Despreaux next to her. Cauchi moved up to the fifth floor while Scott, Guerot, and Despreaux followed him up the same escalators.

At 3:38:02 pm, Cauchi started to run, with Scott and other civilians chasing him. While running, he lunged at several people with the knife without actually stabbing them. Cauchi eventually turned around, and at 3:38:40 pm, he ran towards Scott, still holding the knife in his hand. Scott fired three rounds from her duty handgun, with one striking Cauchi in the shoulder and another striking his neck. The third missed him. As he collapsed, she rolled him over, kicked the knife a safe distance away, and began to perform CPR on him immediately. Both the activation of the shopping centre's alarm system and the sounds of the police shooting alerted more people inside the shopping centre to the attack. More people were evacuated and, in other cases, store attendants locked down their premises, sheltering customers inside.

Scott directed a security guard to see if any shopper had been hit by the stray bullet. No bystander was hit, and when the mall was forensically examined, the bullet was found stuck in a pot plant. It was learned that during the attack, a young woman had been hiding behind it with her child, but they were not in the line of fire. Scott later testified that those five minutes when she had stayed with Cauchi and waited for the guard to return and report on whether anyone had been hit felt like a "lifetime". By then, other police had arrived and took over performing CPR on Cauchi. Scott said she was in a "curious position", as until she was relieved by someone more senior, she was the scene's commanding officer.

== Casualties ==
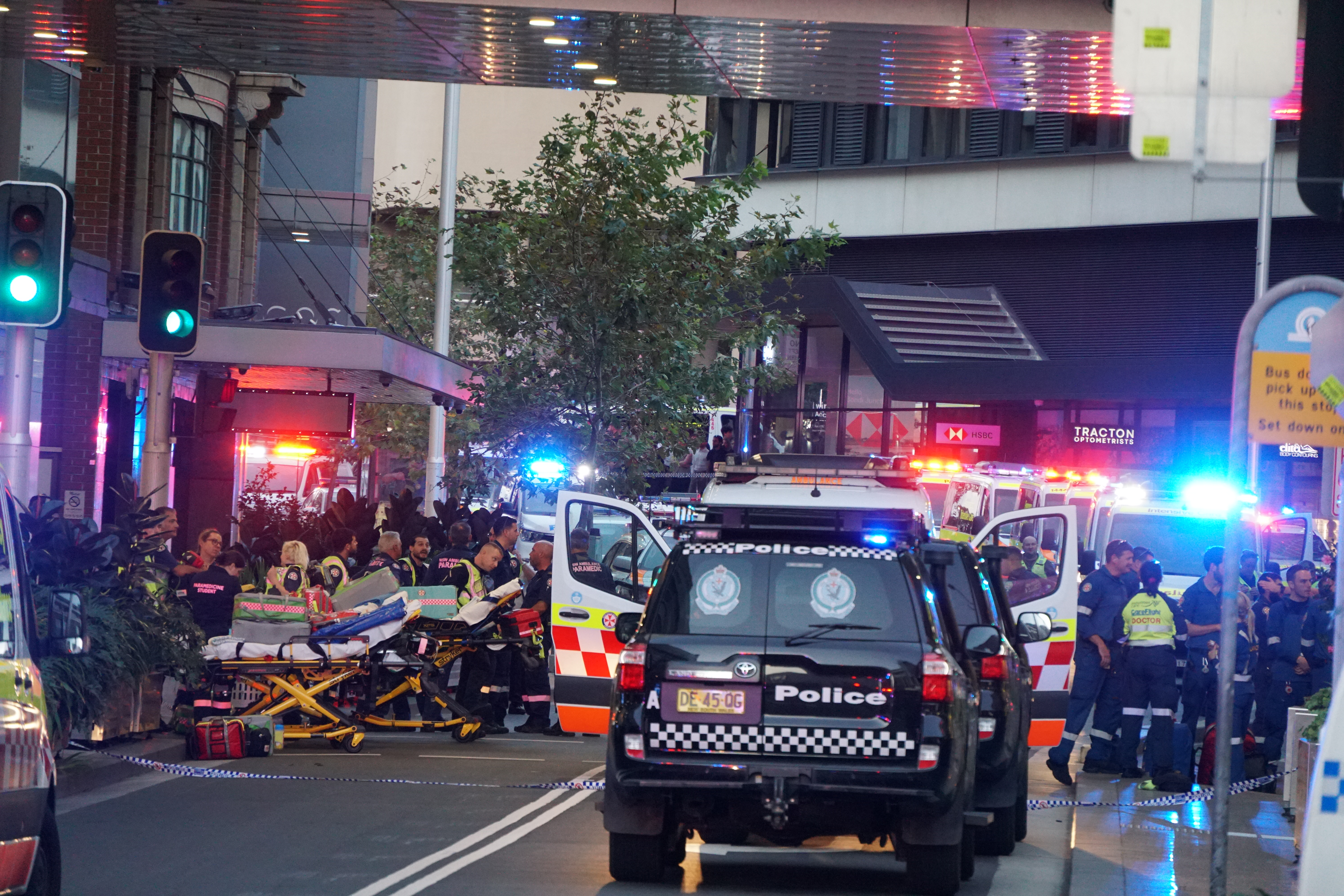
Paramedics outside the shopping centre waiting to treat injured victims

At 6:15 pm, NSW Assistant Police Commissioner Anthony Cooke, in a press conference, initially confirmed five victims had been killed along with the perpetrator, while several others remained critically injured.

Five victims died at the scene. Twelve others were hospitalised, including a nine-month-old girl who underwent surgery, and her mother, who later died in hospital, raising the death toll of victims to six. Some of the injured were described as being in a critical condition. A member of the shopping centre's security was among the injured. On 15 April, China's Foreign Ministry confirmed the death of one Chinese national and the injury of another, stating it will closely monitor the ongoing investigation into the incident.

All six fatalities were adults, comprising five women and one man; the former were shoppers and the latter a security guard. The deceased victims were: Cheng Yixuan, 27 (Chinese: 程逸轩), a student at University of Sydney from China; Pikria Darchia, 55 (Georgian: ფიქრია დარჩია), an artist and designer; Ashlee Good, 38, mother of the wounded baby and daughter of former AFL player Kerry Good; Dawn Singleton, 25, daughter of entrepreneur John Singleton; Faraz Ahmed Tahir, 30 (Urdu: فراز احمد طاہر), an unarmed security guard at the shopping centre and refugee from Pakistan; and Jade Young, 47.

== Perpetrator ==
On the morning after the stabbings, the perpetrator was named as Joel Cauchi, a 40-year-old man from Toowoomba, Queensland, who travelled to Sydney in March 2024. His family contacted police after recognising Cauchi on the news. Cauchi's parents said that they were "absolutely devastated", adding that "Joel's actions were truly horrific". They also said they had no issues with the police officer who shot their son.

Police learned that Cauchi lived a transient lifestyle, was not known to be employed, and was effectively homeless. He was understood to be single with no children. Cauchi had mental health issues and was first diagnosed with schizophrenia at the age of 17, after he was held at a psychiatric hospital for breaking doors and complaining about being "possessed by demons" following cannabis consumption. For around 15 years, he took the atypical antipsychotic clozapine, in addition to another prescription for obsessive-compulsive disorder. Cauchi's mental health had deteriorated after he quit the prescribed medications for both conditions in 2018 and 2019 at suggestion of his psychiatrist, who had begun gradually "weaning him off" starting 2013 when Cauchi voiced concerns over side-effects. In November 2019, a registered nurse recommended that Cauchi resume his prescription for OCD, but Cauchi's father, who also has schizophrenia, opposed this, citing his own untreated experiences with "demons" and "voices", believing that the medication "will kill him". A psychiatrist who treated Cauchi in 2012 had noted contact with his father as a vulnerability due to their shared "over-religious" delusions.

In 2020, Cauchi left home for Brisbane, where he was thrice noted by Queensland Police for erratic driving and once for calling a school to ask for permission to watch their female students swimming during sports. In 2021, Cauchi was given psychiatric approval for a gun licence, but did not purchase any firearms. He moved back with his parents in January 2023 and the same month, Cauchi called police after getting into an altercation with his father, who tried to take away a large collection of knives from Cauchi. His last recorded interaction with Queensland Police was during a "street check" over suspicious behaviour in December 2023.

Cauchi advertised himself as a male escort on social media. Less than a week prior to the attack, he also posted to a Bondi community Facebook page searching for surfing partners within Bondi.

== Investigation ==
There was initial confusion whether there was a second offender, after witnesses heard the gunshots by police and believed that there was an attacker with a gun in the building as well. Preliminary enquiries suggested that Cauchi had acted alone, later confirmed by CCTV footage.

At 8:30 pm, NSW Police Commissioner Karen Webb addressed the media, saying police believed that the incident was not an act of terrorism. She said there was no ongoing risk to the public. She also alluded that the attacker might have been known to police. The Australian Federal Police were subsequently deployed to assist the state police in their investigation.

At a press conference on 14 April, the day after the stabbings, NSW Police identified the perpetrator as Joel Cauchi and that he had only recently moved to Sydney from Queensland. Police subsequently searched a storage facility in Waterloo where Cauchi had rented a locker. Assistant Commissioner Anthony Cooke said that police had not received evidence that the attack was "driven by any particular motivation – ideology or otherwise", adding that Cauchi suffered from mental health issues.

On 15 April, Commissioner Webb said it was "obvious" to her that Cauchi deliberately targeted women during the attack, while avoiding men. Cauchi's mother suggested that he targeted women "because he wanted a girlfriend and he's got no social skills". However, in April 2025, Detective Chief Inspector Andrew Marks claimed during an inquest hearing that Cauchi did not specifically target women, and simply attacked "whoever was in his way", citing his untreated mental illness as a factor. Cauchi's long-term psychiatrist Andrea Boros-Lavack initially told the inquest that she believed that Cauchi was not psychotic at the time of the attack and had acted out of a "hatred for women", but she retracted part of her testimony the following day. A panel of five psychiatrists determined contrary to Boros-Lavack that Cauchi had shown evident signs of psychosis during the attack and noted that he was "effectively without treatment or adequate supervision" for his schizophrenia for five years on account of inaction by Boros-Lavack, who was criticised for discontinuing Cauchi's prescription and failing to report his increasing mental instability.

The inquest found that Cauchi had "developed a fixation on violence, knives and serial killers". His internet history consisted of search prompts for mass stabbings in Australia, serial killers and their favorite bands, and the 1999 Columbine High School massacre, as well as "rudimentary planning" to commit an attack on a mall. Cauchi made searches relating to Columbine on Reddit immediately prior to the stabbings. Testimony and notes from Cauchi's psychiatrists and other mental health caregivers showed that he made statements about being "under satanic control" in 2019 and 2024, experienced irritable moods, and engaged in compulsive behaviours such as pornography addiction, excessive showering, and wearing redundant clothing.

NSW Premier Chris Minns announced the establishment of an A$18 million (US$11.6 million) coronial inquest into the police response, Cauchi's previous interactions with authorities, and the effectiveness of NSW's mental health system. The state government also said that it would review the usage of weapons by security guards in crowded places such as shopping centres and hospitals.

== Misinformation ==
Misinformation about the attack circulated on X, Tumblr and Telegram regarding the identity of the stabber. Initially, the false assumption that the perpetrator was Muslim and the attack was linked to Islamic terrorism was promoted by commentators such as Julia Hartley-Brewer, as well as Britain First co-founder Paul Golding, while Rachel Riley linked the attack to support for Palestine and the "global intifada". Islamophobic and anti-immigrant comments were rife online in the hours after the attack, fuelled by speculation with racist or Islamophobic undertones.

A 20-year-old University of Technology Sydney student with a Jewish surname was also falsely accused of carrying out the attack. Many accounts and political commentators, such as neo-Nazi Thomas Sewell, "Aussie Cossack" Simeon Boikov, and conspiracy theorist Maram Susli, targeted the student for his Jewish heritage. Channel 7 then named the student as the attacker during live coverage and published the report on YouTube without waiting for verification. The company subsequently issued an apology for the error. On 17 April, the student falsely accused of being the attacker sought legal representation for defamation action against Channel 7. The defamation case was settled on 26 April, with Seven acknowledging their error was "a grave mistake".

The Islamophobia Register of Australia recorded 46 reports of hate-related incidents following the stabbing, which it partially attributed to the misinformation released by Islamophobic figures.

== Aftermath ==
A GoFundMe campaign set up in Ashlee Good's name raised over A$650,000 (US$416,000) for her daughter, who was taken out of intensive care on 16 April following surgery for chest and arm injuries and was discharged from hospital on 21 April.

Video clips from bystanders and security footage was widely shared online, depicting Cauchi going after some shoppers while ignoring others. Several shoppers confronted the man, barring his passage to certain areas, as well as grabbing tools from nearby stores to defend themselves. Phone video showed one man, later identified as French construction worker Damien Guerot, preventing the perpetrator from climbing an escalator to a higher floor by brandishing a bollard at him.

During the attack, Cauchi was seen wearing an Australian Kangaroos sports jersey. As a result, the sporting goods retailer Rebel temporarily removed all clothing related to the Australian Kangaroos from its online shopping service and several store locations.

Police returned control of the Westfield shopping centre to its management on the evening of 14 April. The centre reopened on 18 April for a "community reflection day" to allow people to pay their respects and leave floral tributes, with counselling services on site. Scentre Group, which runs the Westfield shopping centre chain, said that it would implement increased security measures in all its stores, including providing enhanced protective clothing for security personnel. It also waived rent payments from the shopping centre's retail tenants from 13 to 19 April. Commercial operations resumed on 19 April.

=== Bravery awards ===
On 21 June, during a graduation ceremony at the Goulburn Police Academy for 169 new officers, Detective Inspector Amy Scott, who stopped the attacker was awarded with the NSW Police Commissioner's Valour Medal, one of the highest in the State's police for those 'who display exceptional bravery in life-threatening situations'.

On 13 April 2026, the Governor-General Sam Mostyn announced eight bravery awards related to the Bondi Junction stabbings. Inspector Scott, Frenchmen Guerot and Despreaux, security guard Taha and deceased victims Good and Tahir were awarded a Bravery Medal for acts of bravery in hazardous circumstances. Nurse Catherine Molihan and victim Jade Young's husband Noel McLaughlin were awarded a Commendation for Brave Conduct for acts of bravery worthy of recognition.

== Reactions ==
Prime Minister Anthony Albanese said that the attack was a "horrific act of violence" and also said he had been briefed on the attack and expressed sympathies with those affected as well as first responders.

He also called Amy Scott a "hero". On 18 April, Damien Guerot was granted permanent residency in Australia in recognition for his actions. This led Muhammad Taha, a security guard from Pakistan who was also injured while confronting Cauchi, to ask why he also wasn't given permanent residency. After his comments were published, Albanese granted Taha permanent residency on 19 April.

Albanese received messages regarding the attack from world leaders such as United States President Joe Biden, UK Prime Minister Rishi Sunak, and New Zealand Prime Minister Christopher Luxon. Sympathies were also expressed by Australia's head of state, King Charles III and his wife Queen Camilla, the Prince and Princess of Wales, Pope Francis, and French President Emmanuel Macron, who also praised Damien Guerot and Silas Despreaux for confronting Cauchi.

Acting NSW Premier Penny Sharpe convened a meeting of the state cabinet which also briefed Premier Chris Minns, who was in Tokyo on leave at the time of the attack and subsequently returned to the state. Minns said he was "horrified to hear about the events at Bondi Junction" and, along with Sharpe, expressed sympathies to those affected as well as first responders. On 15 April, Minns said that he was considering the establishment of a permanent memorial to the victims of the attack. An online condolence book was set up by the NSW government. Queensland Premier Steven Miles offered full cooperation of his state's authorities in the investigation after it emerged that the perpetrator came from Queensland. Additional police were deployed in shopping centres in Queensland as a precaution.

=== Tributes ===
The day after the stabbing, members of the public laid flowers near the shopping centre's entrance on Oxford Street in tribute to the victims, while volunteers were deployed to offer mental health support.

A vigil was also held at Bondi Junction by Australian-based members of the Ahmadiyya community in remembrance of the victims, particularly Faraz Tahir, an Ahmadi Muslim and volunteer contributor to the Ahmadiyya Muslim Youth organisation.

Albanese declared a national day of mourning for 15 April, during which flags were flown at half-mast on government buildings and other major landmarks while the Sydney Opera House was lit up with a black ribbon in the evening.

North Melbourne Football Club players wore black armbands in its Australian Football League match against Geelong on 14 April in honour of Ashlee Good, who was the daughter of its board member and former player Kerry Good.

Season 2 episode 6 of NCIS: Sydney aired on 14 March 2025 with a title card before closing credits in memory of Jade Young. A minute of silence preceded an A-League Men match between Sydney FC and Western Sydney Wanderers, which was played at Allianz Stadium four hours after the attack occurred. A minute of silence was also held at National Rugby League games following the attack, including the Wests Tigers against the St. George Illawarra Dragons at Campbelltown Stadium on 14 April, as well as the Sydney Roosters hosting the Melbourne Storm at Allianz Stadium on 18 April.

A candlelight vigil was held on 21 April by Waverley Council and the NSW Government at Bondi Beach. Hundreds of people attended, including Prime Minister Albanese, Leader of the Opposition Peter Dutton, Premier of New South Wales Chris Minns and Governor of New South Wales Margaret Beazley.

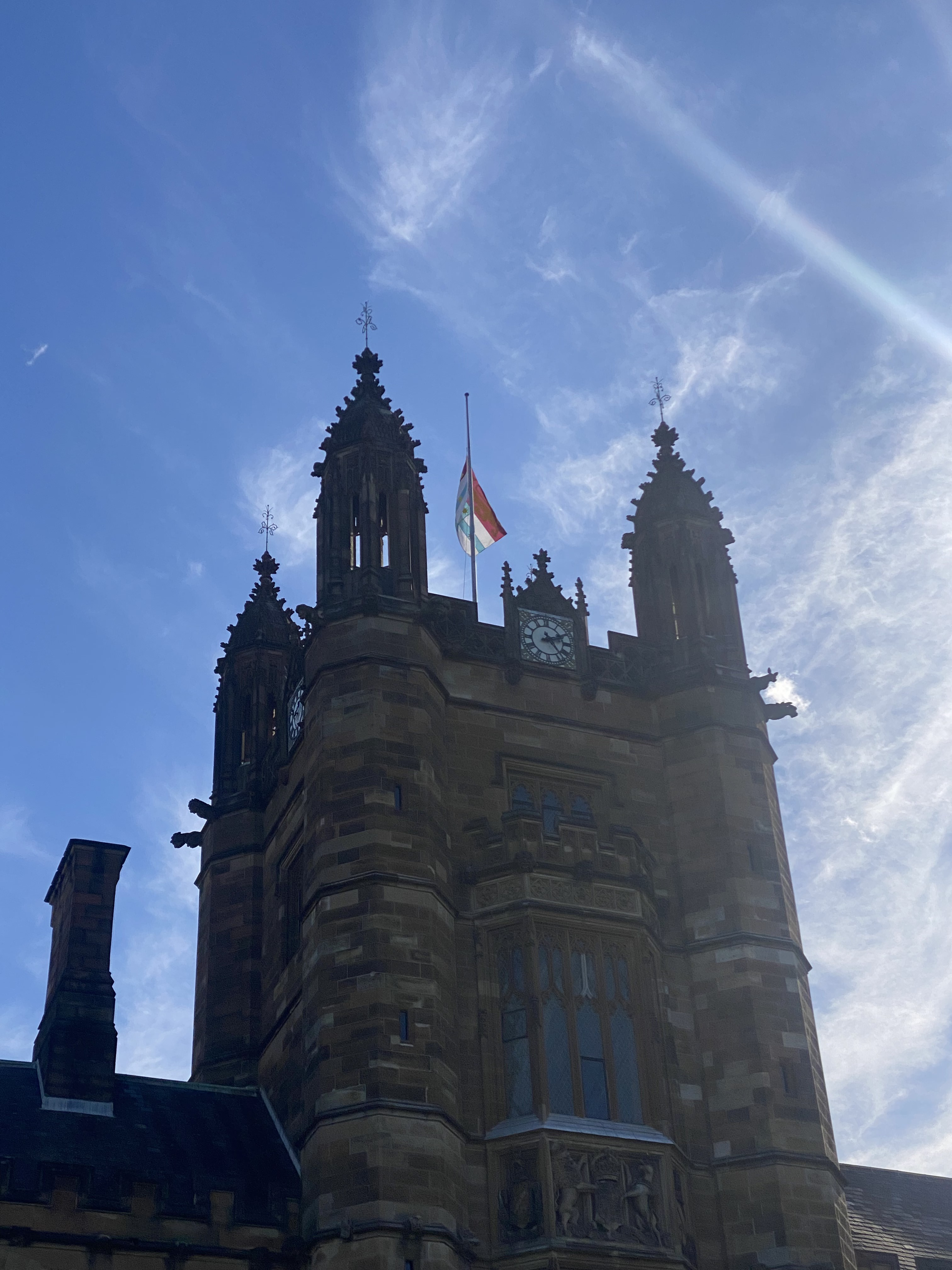
Flag of the University of Sydney at half-mast following the attack

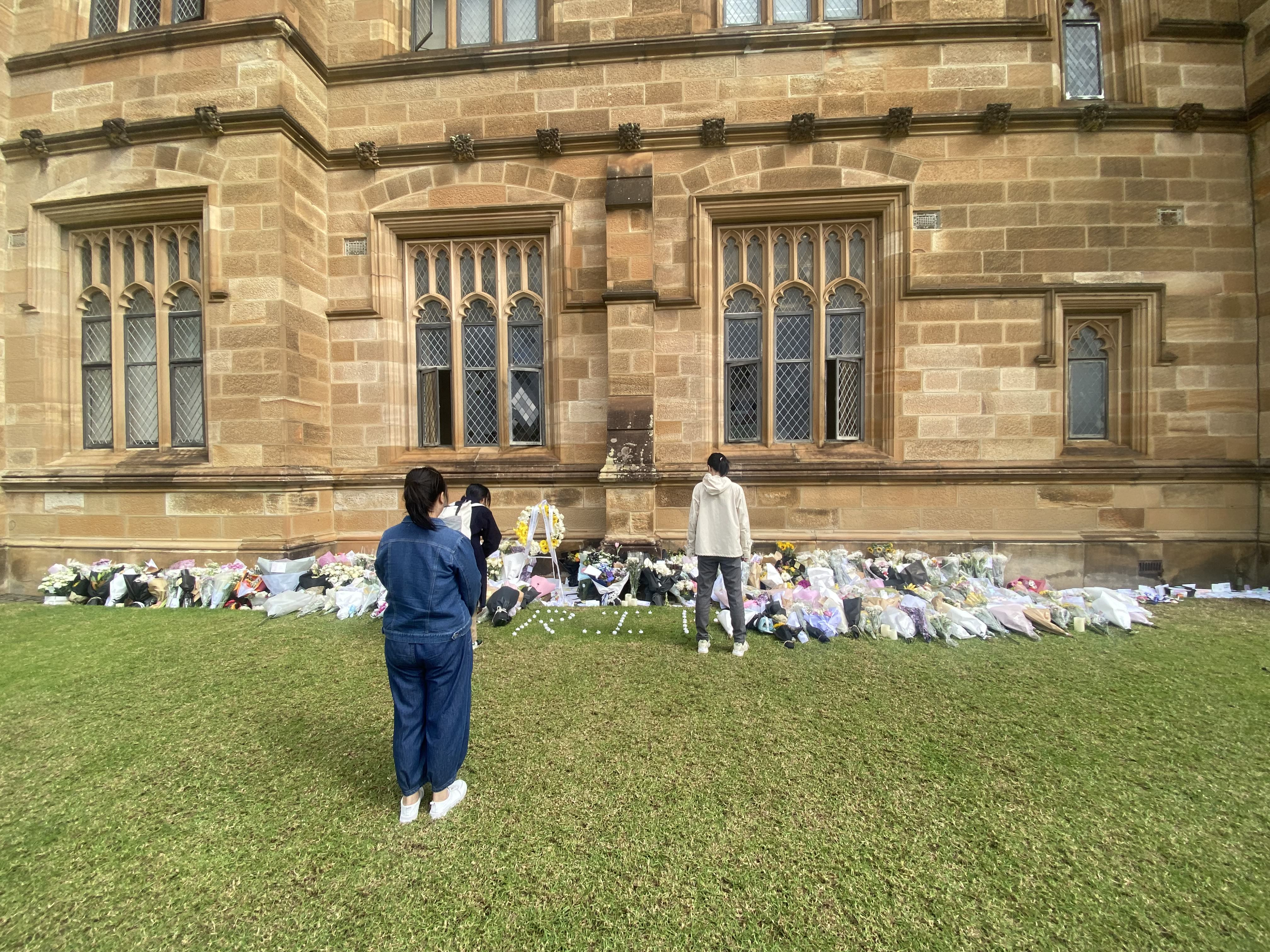
Makeshift memorial honouring victim Cheng Yixuan at the University of Sydney

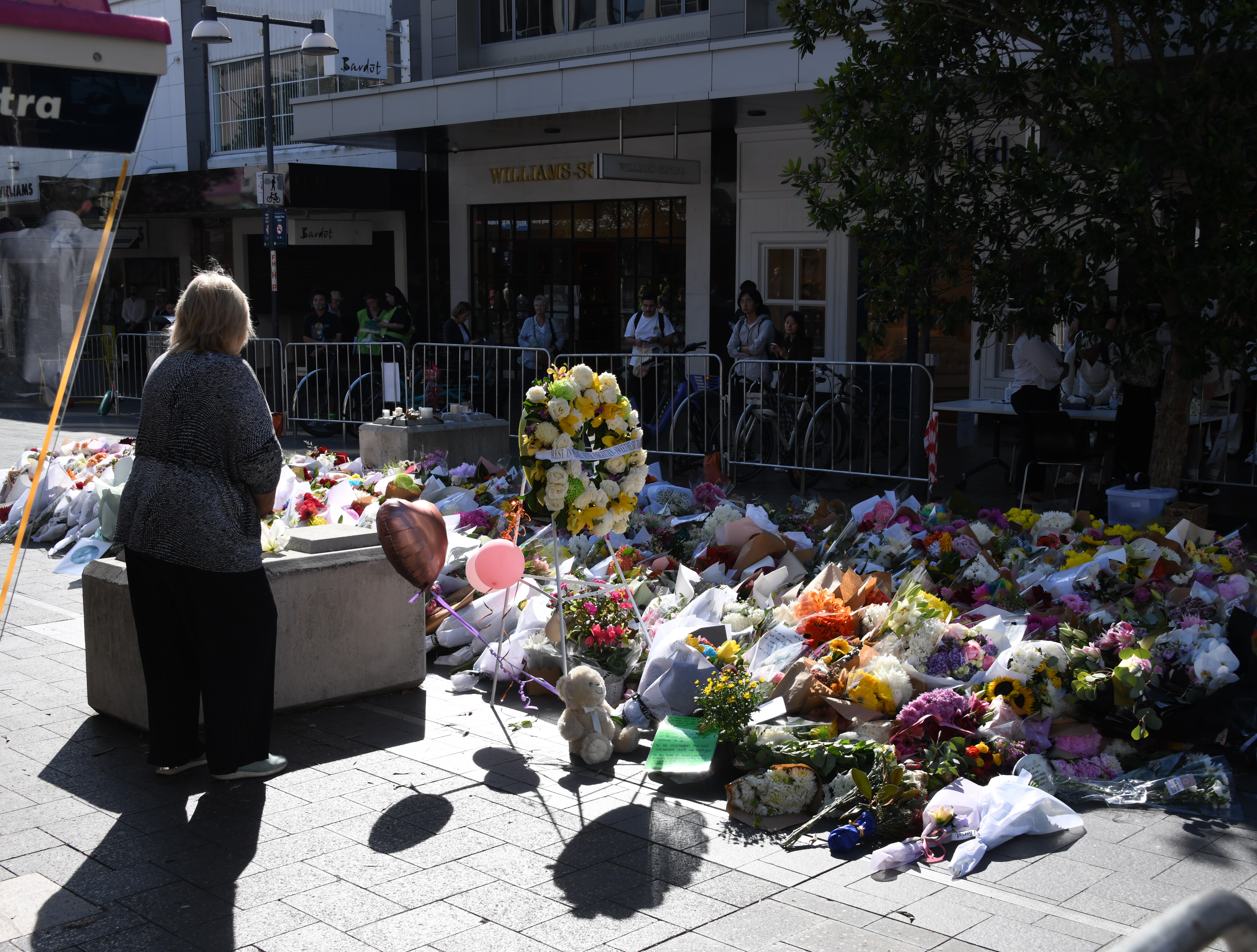
Floral tributes at Bondi Junction after the attack

== See also ==
- List of mass stabbing incidents (2020–present)
- List of mass stabbings by death toll
- 2024 Wakeley church stabbing, another stabbing with three injuries in Sydney that occurred two days after this incident.
- 2025 Bondi Beach shooting
- 2019 Sydney CBD stabbings, another stabbing in Sydney
