= Aussie (shampoo) =

American toiletries brand specializing in hair care products

Aussie is an American toiletries brand. Its products are focused on hair care, such as shampoos, conditioners, hair serums, gels and sprays. While its logo (along with a former advertisement mascot) is a kangaroo and slogan is "Add some roo to your do!" along with earlier advertisements having the voiceover of an Australian woman, the brand is not Australian owned, made, nor conducts research and development in Australia. The products are manufactured in Europe and the United States by Procter & Gamble, an American company. The brand and initial product was created by American businessperson Thomas Redmond in the late 1979.

The Aussie brand portfolio includes hair products for straight, wavy, and curly hair to fix problems such as frizz, dryness, flat hair and damaged hair.

The brand, as it relates to hair care, is unknown in Australia and is not available in that country. It is focused on the United Kingdom and American markets.

== History ==
In 1979, the Aussie hair brand was founded by Tom Redmond, an American businessperson. Prior to this, he had more than 20 years of experience in the professional salon industry.

When visiting Australia, Redmond realised that a wide variety of various ingredients such as Blue Gum Leaves, Australian Custard Apple, Quandong, Mint Balm, Wild Cherry Bark, and Jojoba Seed Oil could be used to produce hair products.

Accordingly, Redmond was inspired to develop the first of the Aussie brand hair products: Australian 3 Minute Miracle (an intensive conditioner that claims to produce results in three minutes).

Prior to 2003 the brand was owned by Bristol-Myers Squibb, an American Pharma and consumer goods company. Bristol-Myers Squibb had purchased the brand from the American consumer goods company Redmond Products in 1997.
