= 2019 Sydney CBD stabbings =

Stabbing attack in Sydney CBD, Sydney, New South Wales, Australia

2019 Sydney CBD stabbing
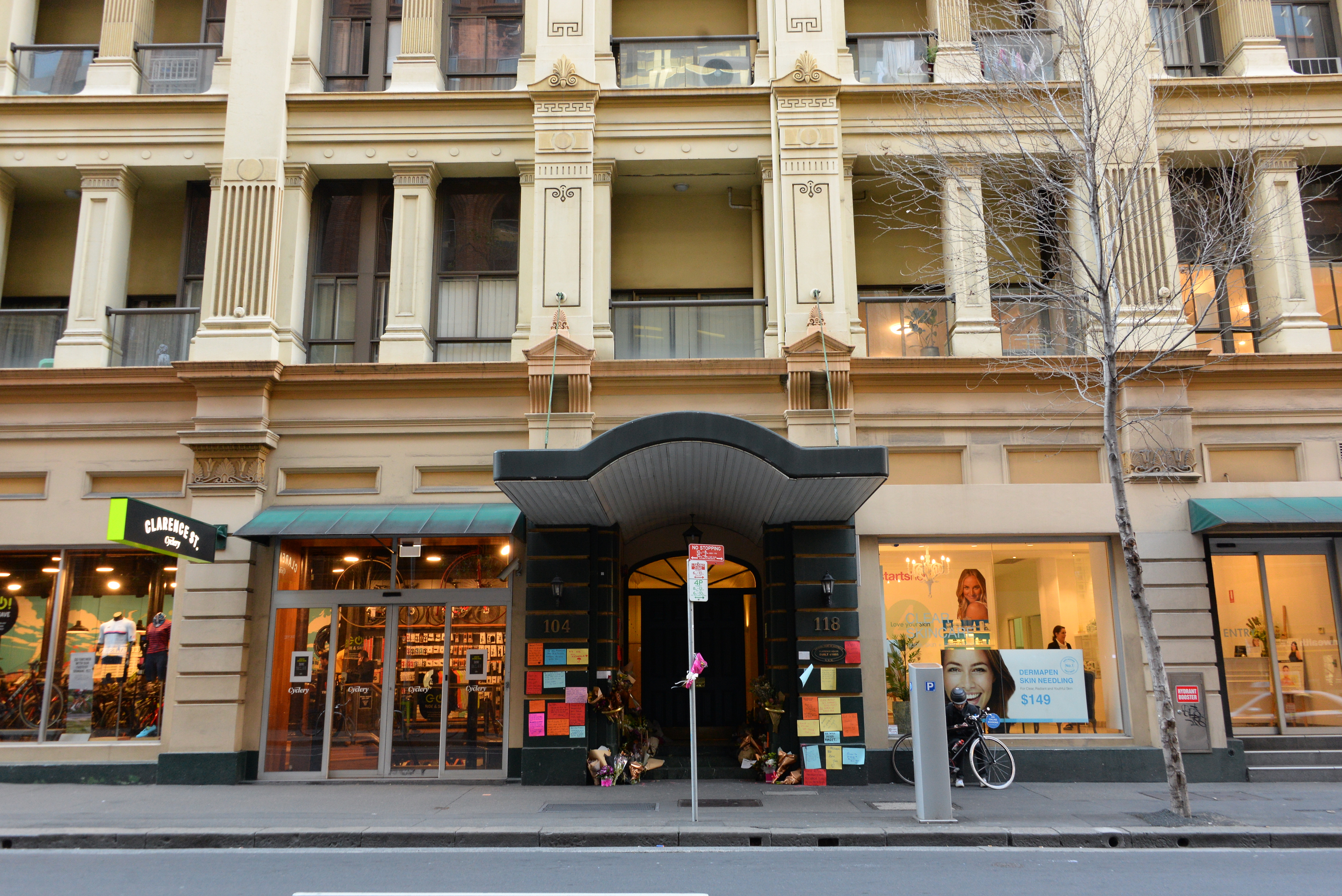
- The apartment building where Michaela Dunn was murdered by Mert Ney
- Location: CBD, Sydney
- Date: 13 August 2019 c. 1:30–2:00 p.m. (AEST (UTC+10:00))
- Attack type: Stabbing
- Weapon: Kitchen Knife
- Deaths: 1
- Injuries: 1
- Victims: Michaela Dunn and Linda Bo
- Perpetrator: Mert Ney
- Motive: Desire to kill; influenced by mental illness and drug use

On 13 August 2019, the lone attacker Mert Ney murdered Michaela Dunn, who was alleged to have been involved in sex work in her apartment. After the murder of Dunn, Ney walked onto York Street, indiscriminately stabbed Linda Bo with a kitchen knife, then proceeded to jump onto random vehicles, yelling profanities and threatening civilians. After an approximate 150 meter chase through the CBD following the stabbing of Linda Bo, Ney was restrained by civilians using assorted furniture. Ney's lawyers defended the charges against him on the grounds of mental illness, and he was sentenced to 44 years in prison in May 2021.

== Attack ==
=== Murder of Michaela Dunn ===
On 13 August 2019, Ney travelled by train from a safe house in Blacktown to the Sydney central business district, arriving at Town Hall shortly after midday. He spent some time at Town Hall House before arranging an appointment with 24-year-old Michaela Dunn, who was working as a sex worker from an apartment on Clarence Street. At approximately 1:04 p.m., Ney contacted one of Dunn's colleagues and requested a 30-minute appointment for 1:30 p.m. The price was set at $250, which Ney agreed to, despite having only a small amount of money with him.

Ney arrived at the Clarence Street building at approximately 1:30 p.m. and entered the apartment, where Dunn was alone. The pair had met previously on at least one occasion. During the encounter, Dunn spoke with Ney before he attacked her. The Supreme Court later found that Dunn had done nothing to provoke the attack and that Ney had travelled to the city intending to physically harm someone. Ney attacked and killed Dunn inside the apartment.

Immediately afterwards, Ney recorded a selfie video on his mobile phone from inside the apartment. During the recording he said "Look at my f***ing hands, im not lying bruv look at my f***ing hands" he also said "Allahu Akbar" while raising his index finger, a finger gesture related to ISIS, and he made another statement referring to "infidels". The recording showed Ney and part of the scene inside the apartment. At approximately 1:49 p.m., he sent the video to a friend through Facebook Messenger.

Ney continued communicating with the friend after sending the recording. In the exchange, Ney described himself as a "f***ing psycho" and wrote that he had been laughing. He later told the friend to "Call cops". Ney also communicated with another person using Snapchat shortly before leaving the building, making statements suggesting that he intended to carry out further violence. The messages and video were later recovered and formed part of the electronic evidence presented during the criminal proceedings.

Ney left the Clarence Street apartment shortly afterwards. His movements from the building and through the CBD were captured by CCTV cameras.

=== Sydney CBD ===
After leaving the apartment, Ney entered the surrounding streets of the Sydney CBD wearing a balaclava and armed with a kitchen knife. At approximately 2 p.m., he attacked 41-year-old Lin Bo near King Street. Bo survived and was assisted by members of the public before being taken to St Vincent's Hospital for treatment.

Ney continued through the CBD as pedestrians fled the area and others began following him. Parts of the incident were captured on CCTV and mobile phone footage. Ney repeatedly shouted "Allahu Akbar" and "Shoot me!". He also climbed onto a vehicle as members of the public attempted to keep him away from pedestrians.

Several members of the public began following Ney while warning other pedestrians to move away. Firefighters Gonzalo Herrera and Bennett Gardiner, who were returning from another job, joined members of the public attempting to stop him. Jamie Ingram, Jase Shore and Mitchell Bennetts were among others who became involved.

The group eventually restrained Ney near Wynyard and held him until New South Wales Police officers arrived. A milk crate was used to help keep Ney restrained on the ground. Footage of the apprehension was widely broadcast following the attack, and police praised the actions of those who intervened.

Police arrested Ney and took him into custody. Officers seized his mobile phone, which later provided investigators with evidence relating to the events inside the apartment and his communications immediately afterwards.

== Motive ==
While a motive for Mert Ney's attack was investigated but not determined, the link towards severe mental illness remained constant. A Sydney Court reported that 1500 pages of Ney's medical reports were collected.

A USB stick was located on Ney's person, that contained information and video files involving the Christchurch mosque shootings and other similar acts of terrorism. After the attack on 13 August, Ney was additionally charged for possessing child abuse material on a USB. Ney denied that it was a terrorist attack but wanted the anti-terrorism police to arrest him after shouting “Allahu Akbar”. Whilst the proclamation does not directly tie to terrorism, this has been defended by his lawyers as a consequence of his mental illness and viewing other terrorist attacks.

Ney refers to himself as "psycho" in the Facebook post involving Michaela Dunn's murder in his apartment room.

Correlations to suicide by cop were made due to the repeated statement of "shoot me" being made by Ney during the public standoff with civilians.

== Perpetrator ==
Mert Ney (born September 1998) was born in Marayong, New South Wales, and is of Turkish Cypriot background. He has two older sisters. His father worked as a computer engineer, and his parents separated in 2013, after which Ney lived with his mother and one of his sisters in Marayong in western Sydney.

Ney attended Marayong Public School and later Blacktown Boys High School. According to evidence considered during his sentencing proceedings, he had few friends at school, had little interest in sport and reported that he had been bullied. He also reported having difficulty concentrating in class, although assessments found no indication of an intellectual disability. His attendance declined significantly during secondary school; after beginning Year 9 in 2014, he was required to repeat the year because of his limited attendance. He returned briefly in 2015 before leaving school.

People who knew Ney before the attack generally described him as quiet and socially isolated. A neighbor in Marayong described him as a quiet and unsociable person, while former classmates similarly recalled that he tended to keep to himself and had few friends.

Ney experienced instability during the years before the attack, including periods of homelessness. Police said in 2019 that he had a history of mental health and substance-use problems and had previously received treatment, including at Cumberland Hospital. Shortly before the attack, he was living with his mother and sister in Marayong. His family had reported him missing after he left home following a domestic dispute, and he had presented to both a general practitioner and Blacktown Hospital during the same period.

Ney's family was not Muslim and relatives rejected early speculation that the family's religious background was connected to the attack. Neighbours also described the family as not outwardly religious.

== Sentencing ==
On 14 May 2021, Justice Peter Johnson of the New South Wales Supreme Court sentenced Mert Ney to 44 years in prison with a non-parole period of 33 years. The sentence took into account previous charges Ney has been found guilty of such as common assault on his sister Yazel. The sentence received a 10% discount as per Ney's guilty plea.

== Prison incidents ==
On 5 December 2022 at approximately 11:15 a.m., Ney was stabbed by another inmate whilst in the exercise yard. Ney was stabbed six times in the head and face and was repeatedly kicked. Shortly after this incident occurred, Ney was rushed to Goulburn Base Hospital.

In July 2024, Ney slashed a prison guard at Goulburn Supermax with a makeshift weapon.

== See also ==
- 2024 Bondi Junction stabbings, another mass stabbing in Sydney, that resulted in 7 deaths.
- 2024 Wakely church stabbings, another stabbing with three injuries in Sydney.
