= Income (United States legal definitions) =

In U.S. business and financial accounting, income is generally defined by Generally Accepted Accounting Principles (GAAP) and the Financial Accounting Standards Board as: Revenues – Expenses; however, many people use it as shorthand for net income, which is the amount of money that a company earns after covering all of its costs as well as taxes.

Net income is also called net profit. It is calculated as follows:

1. The gross income or revenue is tabulated.
2. Where applicable, the cost of goods sold or cost of operations figure is subtracted from the gross income to yield the gross profit.
3. All expenses other than the COGS or COO are subsequently subtracted from the gross profit to yield the profit or income – or, if a negative number, the net loss (usually written in parentheses). More commonly, this is reported on the income statement as "income (or loss) before taxes".
4. Taxes are then subtracted from the pre-tax income to give a final net income or net profit (or net loss) figure.

Net income or net profit which is not expended to shareholders in the form of dividends becomes part of retained earnings.

All public companies are required to provide financial statements on a quarterly basis, and the income statement of income is one of the most important of these. Some companies also provide a more rosy financial report of their income, with pro forma reporting, or, EBITDA reporting. Pro forma income is an estimate of how much the company would have earned without including the negative effect of exceptional "one-time events", supposedly in order to show investors how much money the company would have made under normal circumstances if these exceptional, one-time events had not occurred. Critics charge that, in most cases, the "one-time events" are normal business events, such as an acquisition of another company or a write-off of a cancelled project or division, and that pro forma reporting is an attempt to mislead investors by painting a rosy financial picture. Besides that, when discussing results with analysts and shareholders, CEOs and CFOs have a tendency to do even more "hypothetical accounting". EBITDA stands for "earnings before interest, taxes, depreciation, and amortization", and is also criticised for being an attempt to mislead investors. Warren Buffett has criticised EBITDA reporting, famously asking, "Does management think the tooth fairy pays for capital expenditures?"

It is common for some other companies, such as real estate investment trusts, to present reports using a standard called FFO, or "Funds From Operations". Like EBITDA reporting, FFO ignores depreciation and amortization. This is widely accepted in the industry, as real estate values tend to increase rather than decrease over time, and many data sites report earnings per share data using FFO.
