= Simeon Boikov =

Australian pro-Russian YouTuber (born 1990)

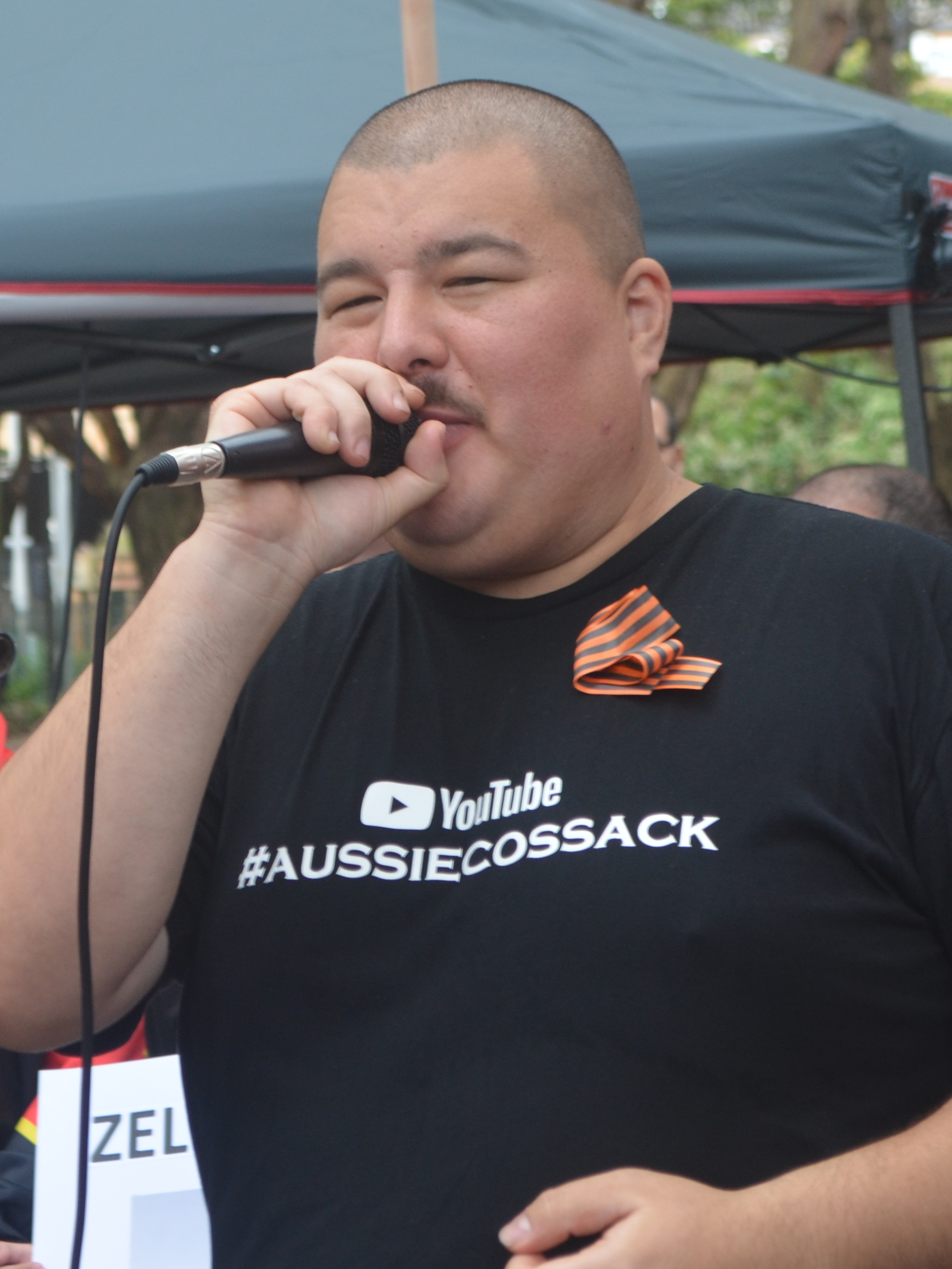
- Boikov in October 2022 at a pro-Russian rally in Sydney
- Born: 15 February 1990 (age 36); Sydney, Australia
- Known for: COVID-19 misinformation, pro-Russian propaganda

Simeon Boikov (born 15 February 1990), better known by the pseudonym Aussie Cossack, is an Australian far-right activist and Russian ultranationalist. He is known for his pro-Russian and COVID-19 misinformation content on YouTube.

Following an attack on a pro-Ukrainian protester, Boikov was charged with assault and his passport was cancelled. Prior to being arrested he hid in the Russian consulate in Sydney, Australia, and was convicted of assault in absentia. He was later granted Russian citizenship in an order signed by Vladimir Putin. As of November 2025, he remains in the Russian consulate in Australia.

== Personal life ==
Boikov was born on 15 February 1990 in Cabramatta, Sydney, to parents of Russian origin. Boikov's father is a Russian Orthodox priest.

== Activities ==
In 2014, Boikov travelled to Russia and met Igor Girkin, a separatist commander from Donbas who was found guilty of destroying Malaysia Airlines Flight 17. He stated that he was convinced that the plane had not been shot down and that its crash had been an accident, despite investigators finding otherwise.

Boikov first appeared on social media under the pseudonym Aussie Cossack. His audience grew during the COVID-19 pandemic when he began relaying and posting anti-vaccination content and covering protests against the government's health policy. He has been interviewed by Alex Jones. He was sentenced to ten months in prison for violating a gag order.

From the beginning of the Russian invasion of Ukraine, Boikov began to relay Kremlin propaganda and disinformation about the conflict. He has openly supported the invasion and is credited with being the "first Australian propagandist for Putin".

During a demonstration in support of Ukraine, Boikov attacked a 76-year-old pro-Ukrainian protestor who had confronted him while he was filming and knocked the man to the ground. In order to avoid arrest he hid in the Russian consulate in Sydney, Australia. He was subsequently charged with assault and his passport was cancelled, the day before he had planned to travel to Moscow. His trial was set for 25 January 2023. In February 2023, Boikov was convicted of the assault in absentia and a second arrest warrant was issued for him.

In April 2023, Boikov's YouTube channel was permanently shut down by the platform. Boikov alleged the shutdown came after he reposted comments by Senator Alex Antic about Australia's vaccine policy.

While in the Russian consulate, Boikov appealed to Russian forces to capture as many Ukrainians or Australian fighters as possible for a potential prisoner swap. As of the end of September 2023, he was still hiding up in the Russian consulate. Boikov was granted Russian citizenship by Vladimir Putin after claiming he was a "victim of persecution".

In 2024, he paid $100 to an X account to post a video that falsely claimed Haitian immigrants were engaging in voting fraud in the swing state of Georgia in the 2024 US election. In November 2025, he complained to ABC that "he was being 'locked in' his room, had been refused visitors and denied permission to hold a christening inside the consulate for his son".

== See also ==
- Russian web brigades
- Russo-Ukrainian cyberwarfare
- Russo-Ukrainian War
