= Funds from operations =

Funds from operations (FFO) is the term that investors use to describe the cash flow of a real estate company or a real estate investment trust (REIT). FFO is a performance indicator created by the National Association of Real Estate Investment Trusts (NAREIT) that is recognized by the SEC to be the standard non-GAAP gauge of financial performance for the real estate sector.

Analysts calculate the standard version of FFO by adding amortization and depreciation to net income, and subtracting any gains made on the sale of assets. There are other forms of FFO that the SEC requires real estate companies to report such as the adjusted FFO, company FFO, and others.

No matter the type of FFO they use, public companies are required to disclose their FFO on their income statement. Investors can use the FFO to determine the financial performance of a real estate company. Unlike other accounting methods, the FFO attempts to remove distortion caused by traditional GAAP accounting methods. Using the FFO allows companies to more accurately state their performance. Often, the FFO is divided by a per-share basis for securities that are publicly traded. Investors frequently utilize the FFO per-share ratio much like they would utilize the EPS of a company.
