= 73 York Street =

Heritage-listed building in Sydney, Australia

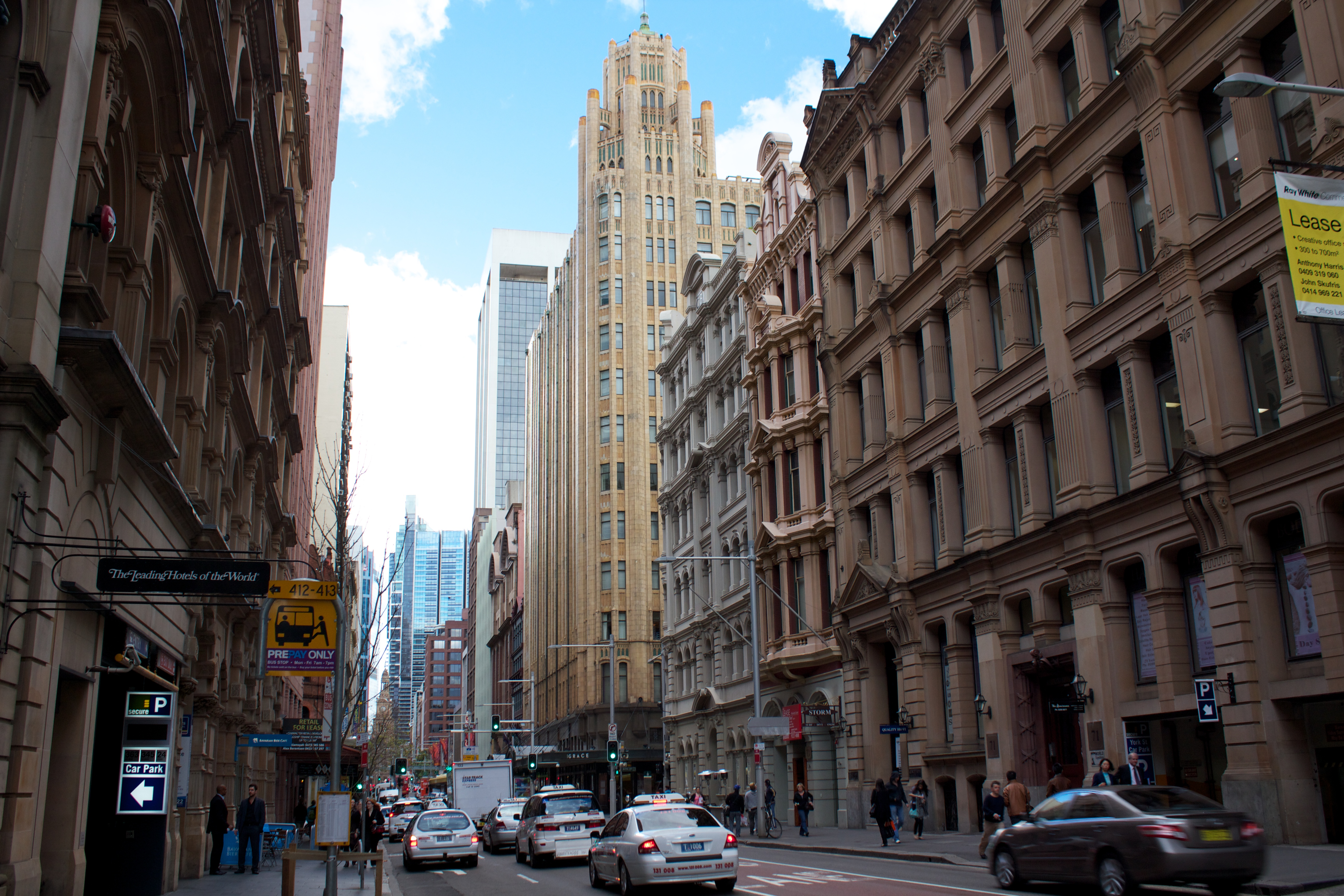
- 73 York Street, located on the right hand side of the road, to the left of 71 York Street. National House is to the left of 73 York Street.

- Location within Sydney Location within Australia
- 33.8684°S 151.2057°E
- Location: 73 York Street, Sydney central business district, City of Sydney, New South Wales, Australia

History
- Built: 1892

Site notes
- Architect: Herbert S. Thompson (attributed)
- Architectural style: Victorian Mannerist

New South Wales Heritage Register
- Official name: Hardware House; Henley House; ICLE House; Monte Paschi House; Cassa Commerciale
- Type: State heritage (built)
- Designated: 2 April 1999
- Reference no.: 580
- Type: Commercial Office/Building
- Category: Commercial
- Builders: Mr Jenkins

73 York Street is a heritage-listed former warehouse and now office building located at 73 York Street, in the Sydney central business district in the City of Sydney local government area of New South Wales, Australia. It was built in 1892, with the design having been attributed to Herbert S. Thompson. It is also known as Henley House, Hardware House, ICLE House, Monte Paschi House and Cassa Commerciale House. It was added to the New South Wales State Heritage Register on 2 April 1999.

== History ==
The building was built c. 1892 as a five-storey warehouse (plus basement). Believed to have been designed by Herbert S. Thompson, the facade is a fine example of the Victorian Mannerist style. The first tenants were warehousemen Alcock Brothers Ltd., importers and wholesalers of soft goods. It was described as a brick warehouse with a slate roof, of six floors and six 'rooms'. The architects Robertson and Marks made applications to the Council in 1901, 1909 and 1911, indicating that alteration may have been made at that time. Subsequent notable tenants include W. T. Henley's Telegraph Works, the Australian Red Cross Society, Boy Scouts Association of NSW, and Alexander Smith and Keeler P/L. Changes to the building occurred in either 1980 or 1981 in what was described as a conversion from warehouses to offices and restaurant.

The building has been known under various names throughout its history. For a period of time after 1910 it was known as Henley House. In more recent years it has been called Hardware House, ICLE House, Monte Paschi House and Cassa Commerciale.

Fife Capital purchased the property in April 2014.

== Description ==
73 York Street is a narrow building of five storeys with basement, with a rusticated stucco base penetrated by three tall arched openings. The five-bay facade rises in a rich composition of tuck-pointed brick and modelled stucco. The centre bays of the first to third floors project as an elongated faceted and bracketed oriel with a small pediment at each level, surmounted by a segmental, open-crown pediment. The top storey has a bracketed cornice crowned by a stepped, pilastered and pedimented parapet with a niche and its own segmental pediment. The entire panoply of painted stucco and brick, including Mannerist panelled pilasters, capitals, entablatures and mock balustrades, integrated with tall timber windows, confers on the building a notably opulent quality. Originally the structure comprised a centre row of cast iron columns supporting steel lateral girders. All but one of these columns have gone and the beams strengthened by embracing double channels.

== Integrity and modifications ==
The facade was reported to be in good condition as of 2015; excluding the ground floor level, it remains largely intact. The interior spaces have been substantially modified through a series of renovations over time to convert the warehouse for commercial and retail uses.

Most notable changes over time include:

- construction of a modern lift core and fire stair along the north wall, including amenities;
- central row of cast iron columns removed from each floor. Floors now span full width of the site, from north to south. Four cast iron columns remain on the basement floor;
- early plans show a light well approximately 1/2 way along the south wall. Plans dating from 1909 show this to be blocked;
- the rear wall overlooking the light well likely dates from 1909. Aluminium windows in it are c. 1980s;
- much of the timber floor structure including flooring and hardwood joists appears to be original, including on level 13;
- early internal finishes such as ceilings and plastered walls have been removed and replaced, but the building retains some early (possibly original) window joinery to York Street.

== Significance ==
73 York Street has aesthetic significance as a splendid example of the ebullient architecture of the late Victorian boom period. It is a rare surviving example of that style in Sydney. It is a wonderfully attractive element in an already interesting streetscape. It has historic significance as a rare example of the more opulent kind of central urban warehouse design intended to create the impression of permanence and quality in the period of great prosperity that ended with the disastrous depression of 1893. The structure retains four of the original internal cast-iron columns, as well as most of the original timber floor structure.

== Heritage listing ==
Hardware House was listed on the New South Wales State Heritage Register on 2 April 1999.

== See also ==
- Australian non-residential architectural styles
