= Grace Building, Sydney =

Historic building in New South Wales

Coordinates: 33.868923°S 151.205853°E

Grace Building
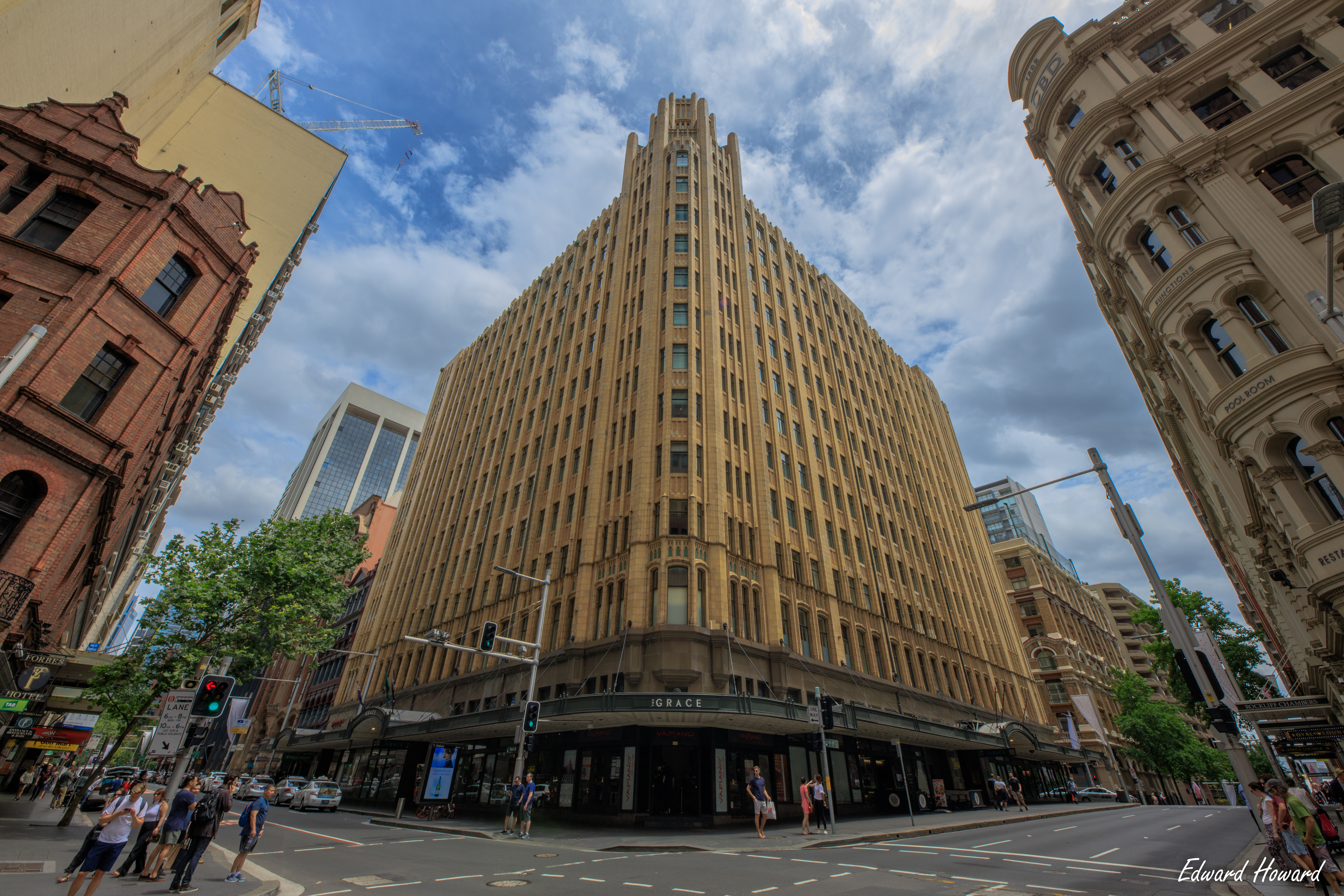
- The exterior of the Grace Building, from York Street

- Location within Sydney
- Etymology: Grace Bros

General information
- Status: Completed
- Type: Skyscraper
- Architectural style: Federation Skyscraper Gothic
- Location: 77–79 York Street, Sydney central business district, New South Wales, Australia
- Current tenants: Hotel, Café, Restaurant, Bar
- Construction started: 1928
- Completed: 1930
- Owner: Linkbond (Asia) Ltd

Design and construction
- Architecture firm: Morrow and Gordon

New South Wales Heritage Register
- Official name: Grace Building
- Type: State heritage (built)
- Criteria: a., c., e.
- Designated: 2 April 1999
- Reference no.: 712
- Type: Commercial Office/Building
- Category: Commercial

The Grace Building is a heritage-listed building of the Federation Skyscraper Gothic style that houses a bar, hotel, cafe and restaurant and is located at 77–79 York Street in the Sydney central business district in New South Wales, Australia.

Designed by Morrow and Gordon and built by Kell & Rigby during the late 1920s, it was opened in 1930 by Grace Bros, the Australian department store magnates, as their headquarters. "The building was designed to use the first two storeys in the manner of a department store. The remaining storeys were intended to provide rental office accommodation for importers and other firms engaged in the softgoods trade". Inspired by the neo-Gothic Tribune Tower in Chicago—headquarters of the Chicago Tribune—the building was of the Art Deco architectural style and had state-of-the-art innovations and facilities for the time.

The Grace Building has served various purposes since its opening; it was sublet to the Australian Commonwealth government in the early 1940s and later became the Sydney headquarters of the U.S. armed forces under General Douglas MacArthur during the Pacific War. After World War II, it continued to be used for government administration purposes and was compulsorily acquired by the Commonwealth in November 1945.

Extensive renovation and restoration during the 1990s resulted in the return of many of the building's original features, including light fittings, lifts, stairwells, high pressed-metal ceilings, marble floors, wide hallways, and elegant decorative ironwork. The Grace Building was listed on the (now defunct) Register of the National Estate in 1980 and placed on the New South Wales State Heritage Register on 2 April 1999. The building was purchased for redevelopment in 1995 by the Low Yat Group of Malaysia. Since June 1997, it has operated as a luxury hotel known as "The Grace Hotel".

== History ==
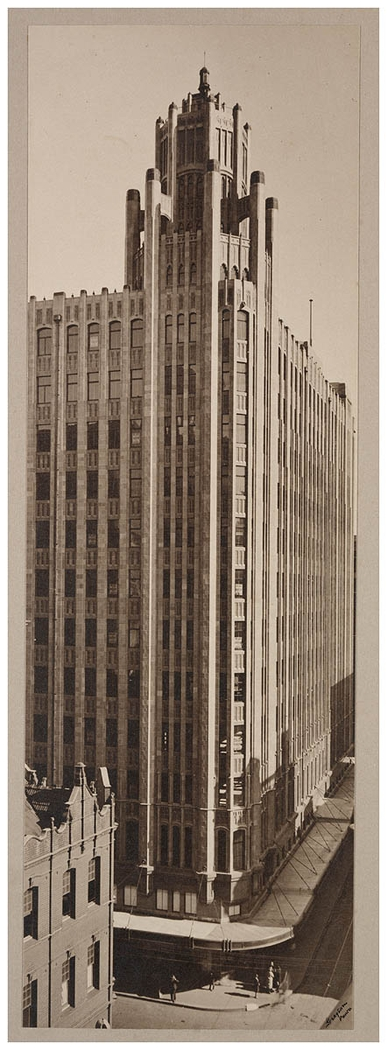
The building after completion in 1930, by Max Dupain.

Sydney had become Australia's largest and most populous city by the early 1900s, thus assuming its position as Australia's leading financial city and one of the most prosperous cities in the Asia-Pacific region. World War I had since ended and Australia's immigration was high–with many of its settlers choosing Sydney as their home. It was constructed as a headquarters and department store for the Grace Bros chain, who had a long and illustrious history of serving Sydney, particular its upper class gentry. Founded by English immigrants Albert Edward and Joseph Neal Grace, in 1885, the first Grace Bros store was a modest building located on George Street. After their accenting to power, a major store was opened on Broadway, outside of the central business district.

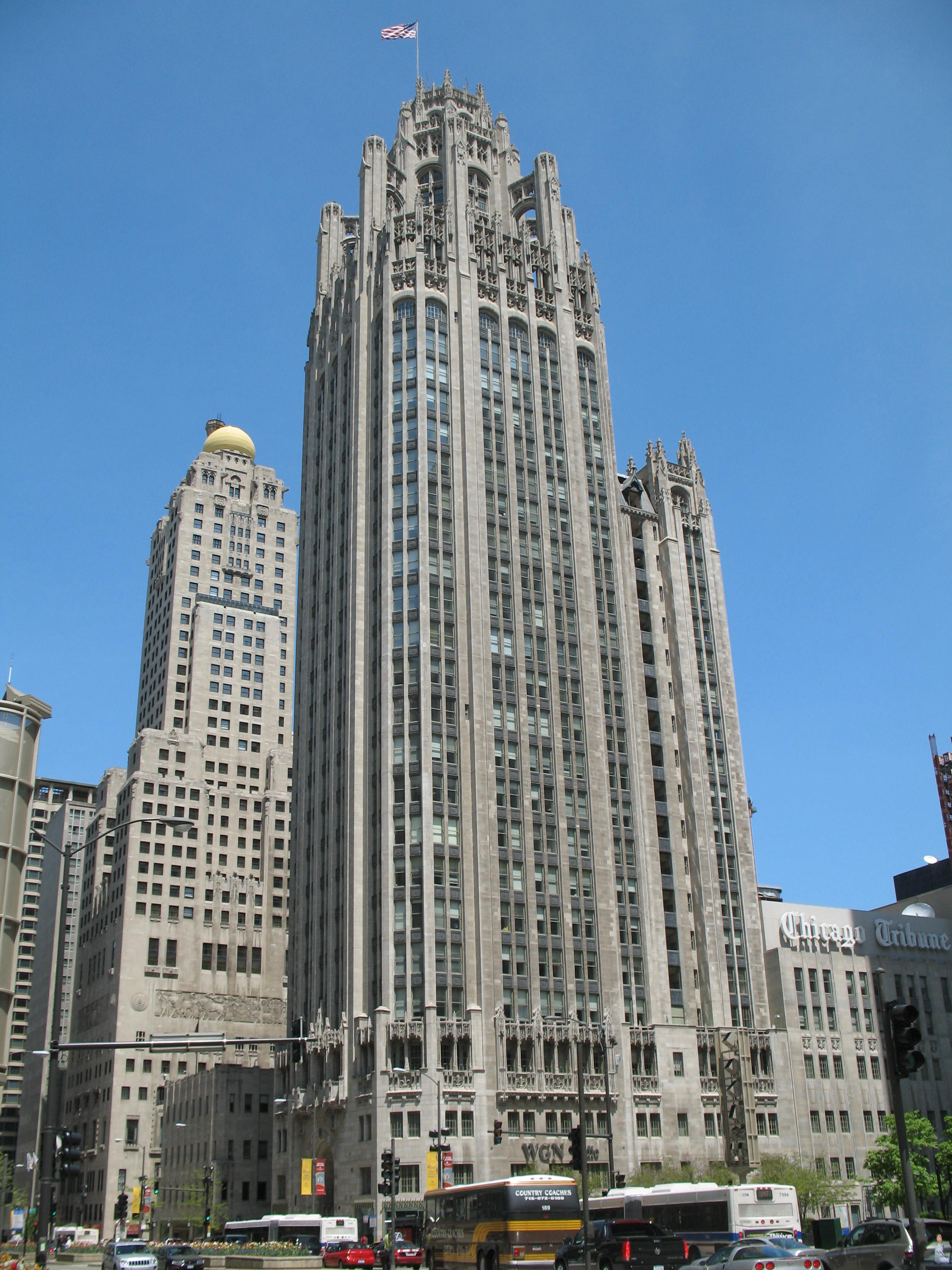
The Tribune Tower in Chicago, Illinois heavily influenced the architecture of the Grace Building.

In 1926, the Grace brothers purchased a block of land on the corner of York, King and Clarence streets, on which the "jewel crown" of their business empire would be built. The location was the site of the original Sydney Opera House, and they believed the site was perfectly positioned for the building that they planned would become "The Showpiece of the Company", with new public transport routes and the coming Sydney Harbour Bridge turning York and Clarence streets into the major city thoroughfares that they are today. Company letterhead billed the building as being "...on the Harbour Bridge Highway." Broadway, location of the other Grace Bros building, had been affected by the shift of the city's commercial district toward Circular Quay in the 1920s and the changing public transport routes away from Sydney's South end, and so the Grace Building would become the company's saviour. The Grace Building was officially opened by Sydney Lord Mayor Ernest Marks on 3 July 1930. Its designed was heavily influenced by the Chicago's Tribune Tower, another remnant of 1930s art deco architecture in the United States.

York Street, however, did not become the shopping thoroughfare the Grace brothers had envisaged and, combined with the effects of the Great Depression of the 1930s, the building never lived up to expectations. By the onset of World War II Grace Bros was experiencing difficulty in leasing office suites and much of the space was allocated to government departments. In 1943, the Grace Building was requisitioned under national security regulations by the Federal Government for use as headquarters by the Supreme Commander of allied forces in the south-west Pacific, General Douglas MacArthur. In 1945, the Grace Building was compulsorily acquired by the Commonwealth. In 1995, it was purchased by the Low Yat Group of Kuala Lumpur for adaptive reuse as a 387-room hotel, opening in 1997. It remains a hotel to this day.

== Description ==
A fine example of commercial Gothic, with a soaring vertical emphasis and prominent "Gothic" corner tower, complete with flying buttresses, pointed windows and quatrefoils. Sheathed in glazed cream terra cotta, details are picked out in green. Decoration is limited, skyscraper fashion, to the summit and lower portion of the building. The street level facade has been altered, but the facade above the awning remains intact.

=== Condition ===
Physical condition good. Archaeological potential is low.

=== Modifications and dates ===
- Constructed between 1928 and 1930.
- In 1942 the ground floor facade and glazing was boarded up with hardboard screens. An air-raid shelter was constructed in the basement around the same time.
- 1940s became accommodation for a range of Commonwealth Departments, and the United States Armed forces' headquarters in Sydney. Anecdotal evidence links General MacArthur's name with a system of tunnels running beneath York Street to Circular Quay and Victoria Barracks. These were constructed prior to World War II and it is likely that at least one of them housed emergency telephone equipment should armed conflict within Sydney damage or destroy existing exchanges.
- November 1945 compulsorily acquired by the Commonwealth government.
- May 1946 a special conference held to decide Commonwealth use for the building. Successful applicants for floor space included the Postmaster General's Department, the Repatriation Commission, the War Service Homes Commission, the Film Censorship Board and the Department of Labor and Industry.
- 1945+: massive intervention in the interior has been conducted since World War II resulting in removal and obstruction of much of the original interiors.
- 1948: telephone exchange opened in December.
- 1950 the Post Office was opened in December.

== Heritage listing ==
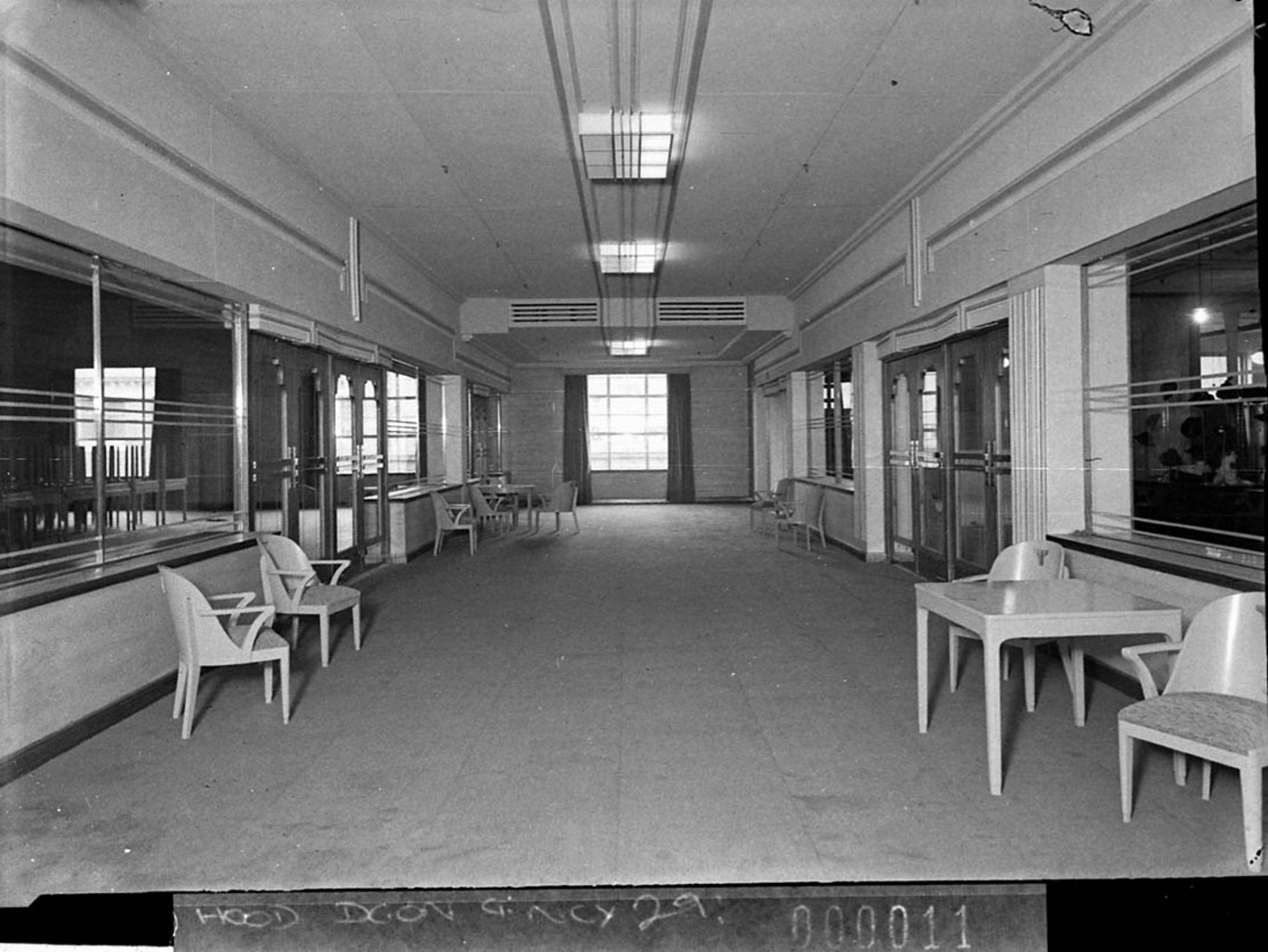
Entrance foyer, Grace Bros Auditorium, Sam Hood, 1937

As at 1 October 1997, The Grace Building is historically significant because of its associations with the retail boom of the 1920s. It epitomises the optimism and dynamism of that period as well as the subsequent economic collapse and Great Depression. It is also associated with the World War II presence of United States military forces in Australia and with General Douglas MacArthur in particular. It is architecturally significant because it is Sydney's finest example of the skyscraper gothic style which illustrates the American influence on Australian commercial architecture and is a distinctive landmark in the city. It was one of the most significant works of Morrow and Gordon, a leading architectural firm of that period. The Grace Building is technically significant because of the unusual reinforced concrete slab and beam construction and the glazed architectural terra cotta cladding.

Grace Building, Sydney was listed on the New South Wales State Heritage Register on 2 April 1999 having satisfied the following criteria.

The place is important in demonstrating the course, or pattern, of cultural or natural history in New South Wales.

The Grace Building is historically significant because of its associations with the retail boom of the 1920s and epitomises the optimism and dynamism of that period as well as the subsequent economic collapse and Great Depression. It is also associated with the World War II presence of United States military forces in Australia and with General Douglas MacArthur in particular.

The place is important in demonstrating aesthetic characteristics and/or a high degree of creative or technical achievement in New South Wales.

It is architecturally significant because it is Sydney's finest example of the skyscraper gothic style which illustrates the American influence on Australian commercial architecture and is a distinctive landmark in the city. It was one of the most significant works of Morrow and Gordon a leading architectural firm of that period.

The place has potential to yield information that will contribute to an understanding of the cultural or natural history of New South Wales.

The Grace Building is technically significant because of the unusual reinforced concrete slab and beam construction and the glazed architectural terra cotta cladding.

== Gallery ==
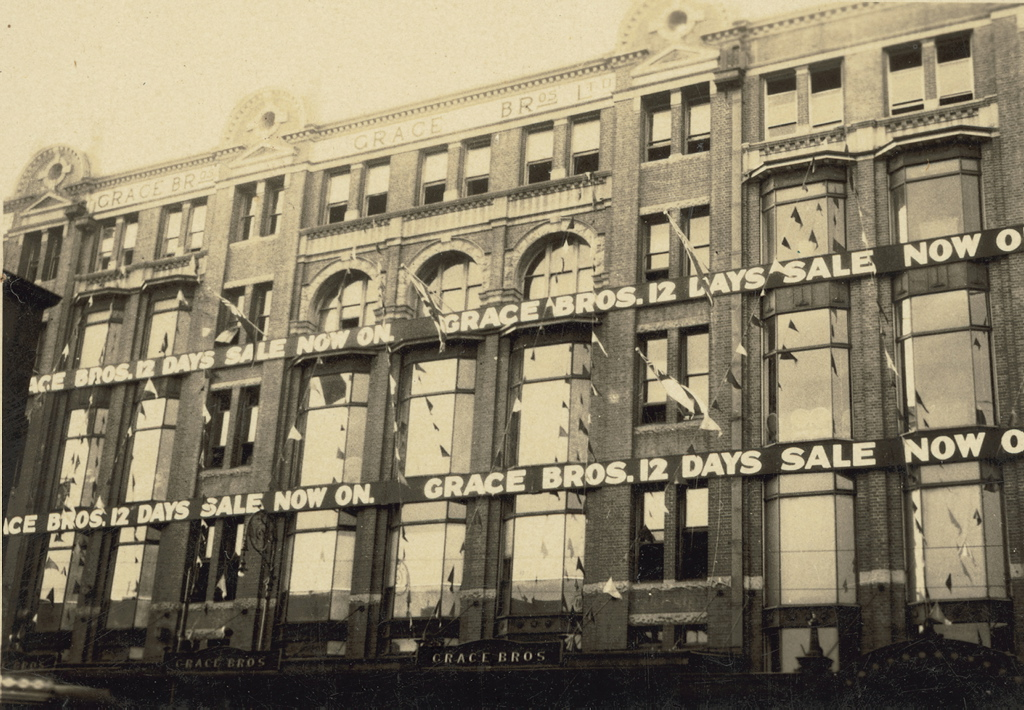
Broadway Grace Bros store in the 1930s

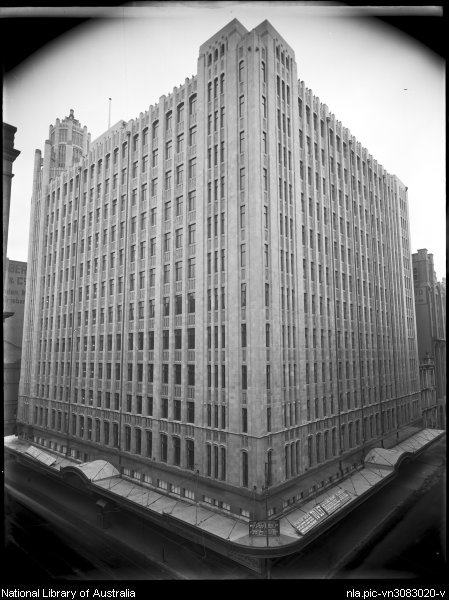
The Grace Building, between 1920s–40s

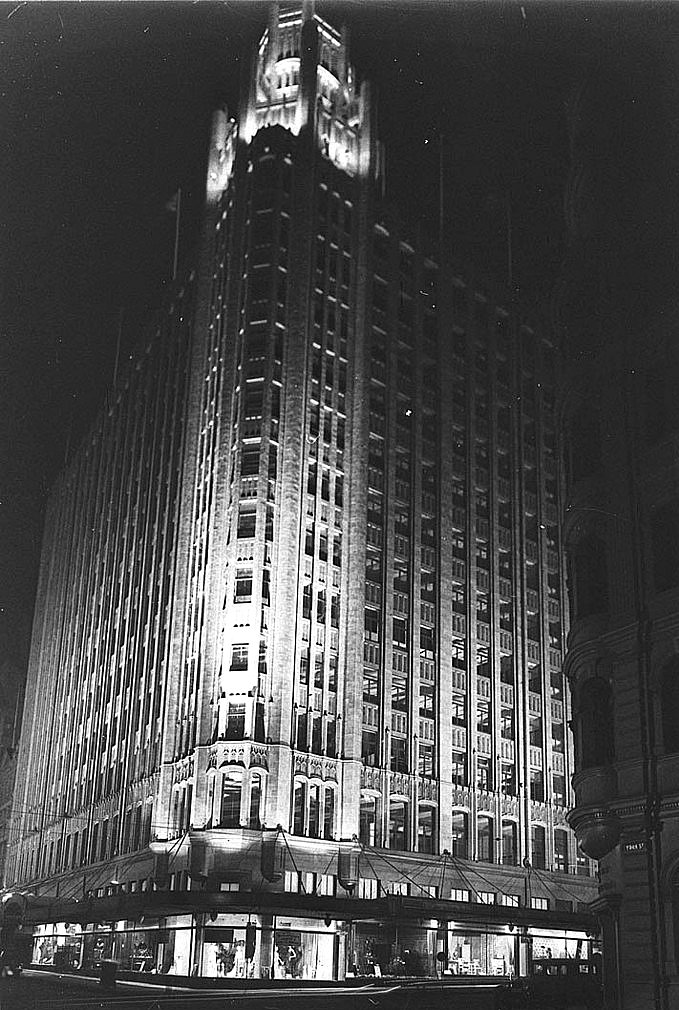
At night, ca. 1930.

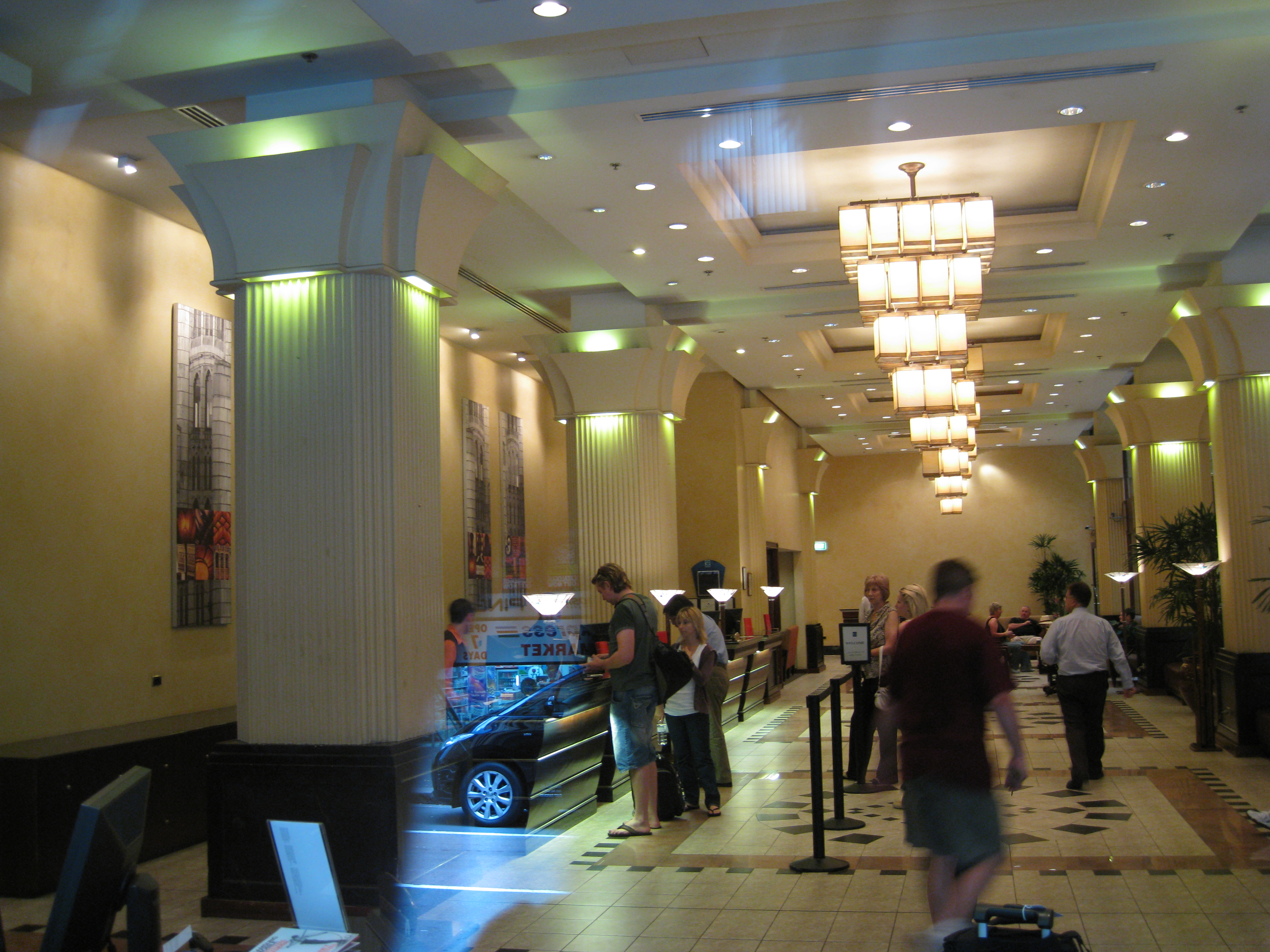
The lobby of the Grace Sydney hotel in 2010

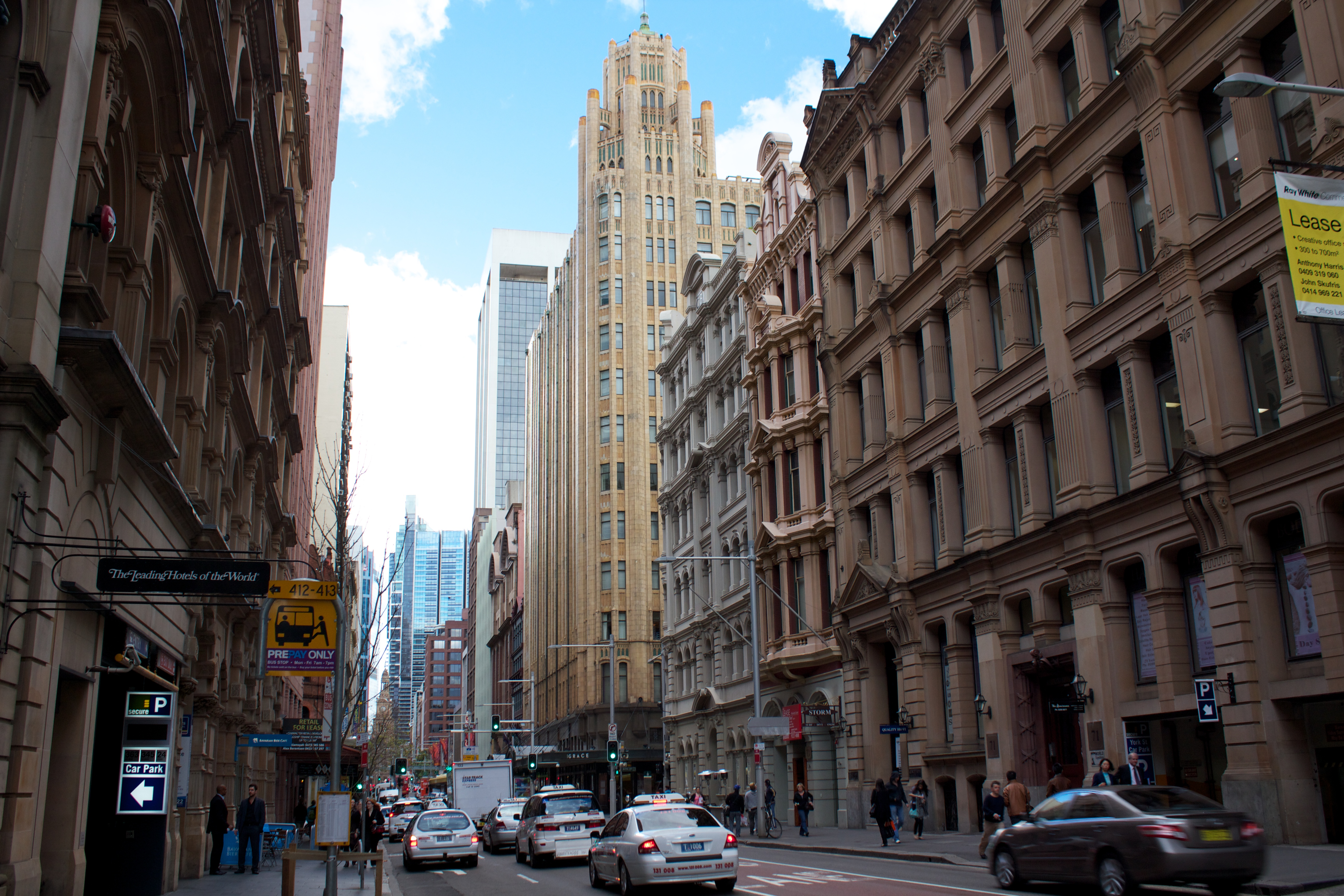
The building from York Street

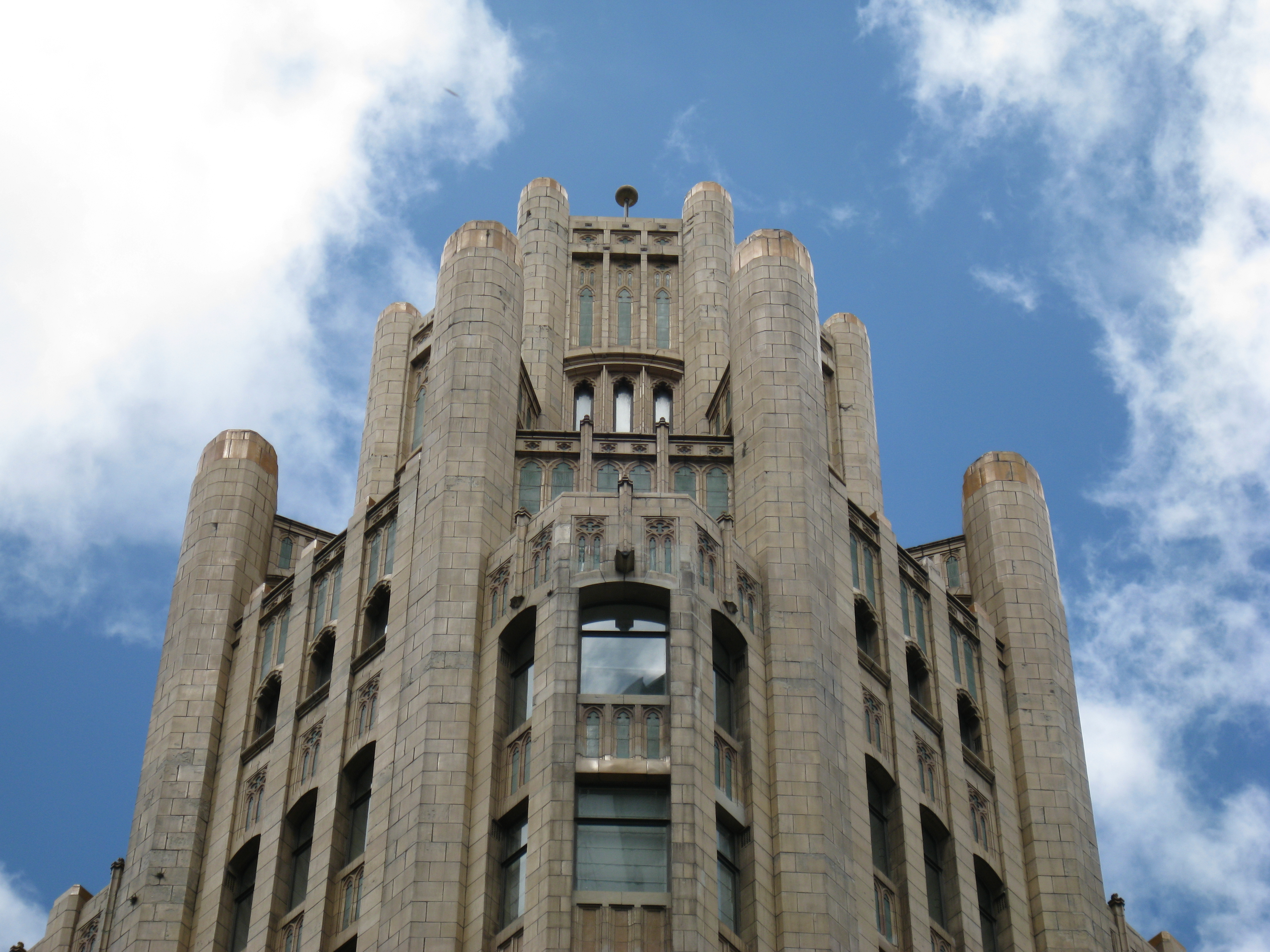
Summit of the neo-Gothic corner tower

== See also ==
- Architecture of Sydney
- List of tallest buildings in Sydney
