= Scots Church, Sydney =

Scots Church
- Scots Church Sydney
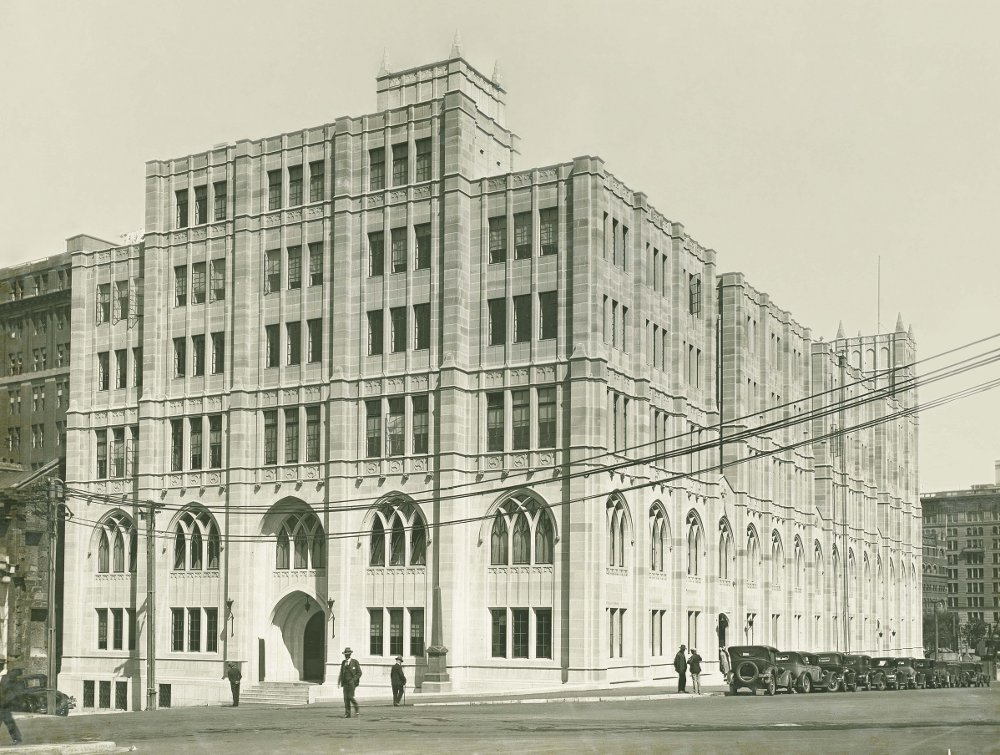
- The current Scots Church in 1931
- Scots Church
- 33°51′53″S 151°12′21″E
- Location: 42-44 Margaret Street, Sydney central business district, New South Wales
- Country: Australia
- Denomination: Presbyterian
- Tradition: Trinitarian, Bible-based
- Website: scotschurchsydney.org

History
- Status: Church
- Founded: 1824 (first church); 30 November 1929 (second church)
- Founders: Thomas Brisbane (1824); Lord Stonehaven (1929)

Architecture
- Functional status: Active
- Architects: Rosenthal, Rutledge & Beattie (1929 church); Tonkin Zulaikha Greer (2005 apartments)
- Architectural type: Church
- Style: Inter-War Gothic Revival

Administration
- Division: New South Wales
- Parish: Scots Church Sydney

New South Wales Heritage Database (Local Government Register)
- Official name: Scots Church including interior
- Type: Local heritage (built)
- Designated: 14 December 2012
- Reference no.: 2423854
- Builders: Beat Bros.

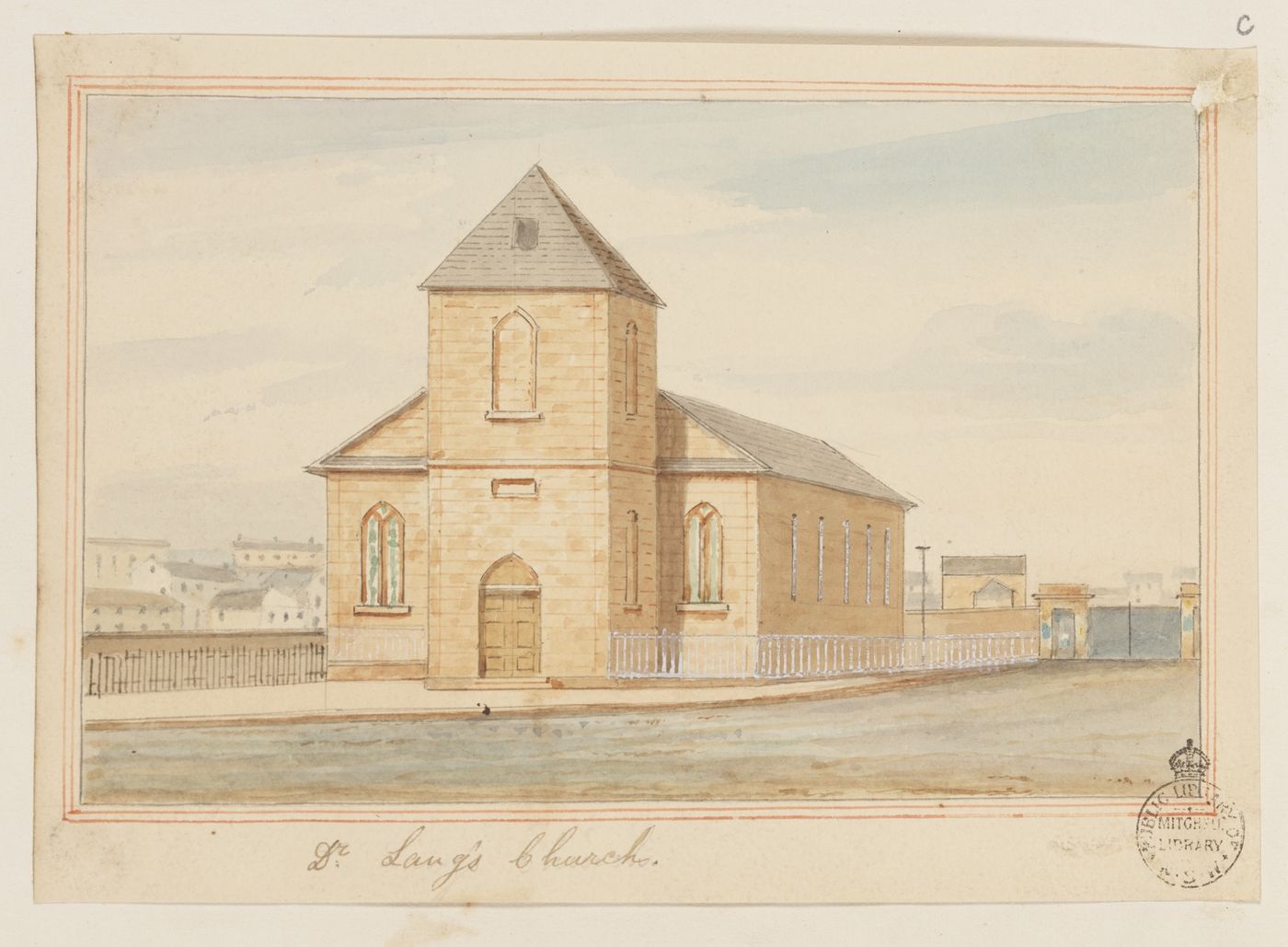
Scots Church, Sydney, 1840s

The Scots Church Sydney is an active congregation of the Presbyterian Church in Australia. The historic Presbyterian church located at 42–44 Margaret Street on the corner of York Street, in the Sydney central business district, in the City of Sydney local government area of New South Wales, Australia. It was designed by Rosenthal, Rutledge & Beattie and built by Beat Bros in 1929. Since 2005, the 1929 building has supported a high rise apartment building on top of it, designed by Tonkin Zulaikha Greer.

The 1929 building replaced an earlier 1824 church on an adjacent site - the first Presbyterian church in Sydney, founded by John Dunmore Lang - which was resumed and demolished for construction of the Sydney Harbour Bridge and Wynyard railway station.

== History ==
=== Old church (1826–1926) ===
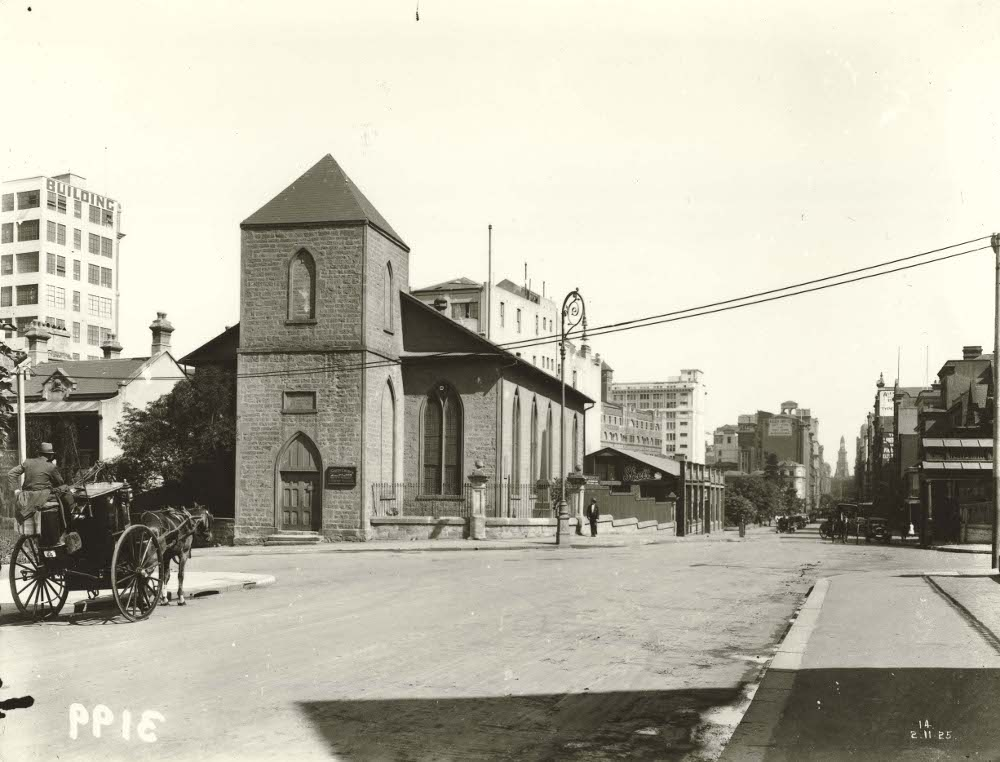
The old church in 1925, shortly before demolition

Scots Church is located in a part of the city known historically as Church Hill; an important place in Sydney's fabric from the foundation of European settlement. The colony's first church, St Philip's Anglican Church, was built on this hill in the 1790s. A Wesleyan Methodist chapel was built near the hill in the 1820s and the foundation stone for the original Scots Church was laid in July 1824, opening on 16 July 1826. It was the first Presbyterian church erected in the city, founded by John Dunmore Lang who had arrived in the colony in 1823. St Patrick's, the Roman Catholic church on the northern side of Church Hill, was built in the 1840s.

The original church was built at the cost of £3,000, with seating for 900 people. It was built in the Norman-Gothic style, "typical of the rural churches in Scotland". Lang was the church minister until his death in 1878. The church also held the Presbyterian Church offices from 1892 to 1904. Short-term ministers under Lang, or while he was absent, included Barzillai Quaife (1846-1847) and John Reid (1858-1862). The original church celebrated its centenary in 1926.

In 1926, the NSW Government began resuming both the Scots Church and the church offices in York Street for the construction of the Sydney Harbour Bridge roadworks and Wynyard Station, a process that would take until 1929. Demolition was to begin on 30 November 1926.

The old church held its final services on 28 November 1926. It had seen only five ministers in over a century: Lang (to 1878), A. Milne Jarvie (to 1886), W. M. Dill-Macky (to 1913), Thomas Tait (1925–1933) and Henry Robert Grassick (until closure). Another Scots Church clergyman, 1882–1893, was John Young Wai.

=== New church (1929–present) ===
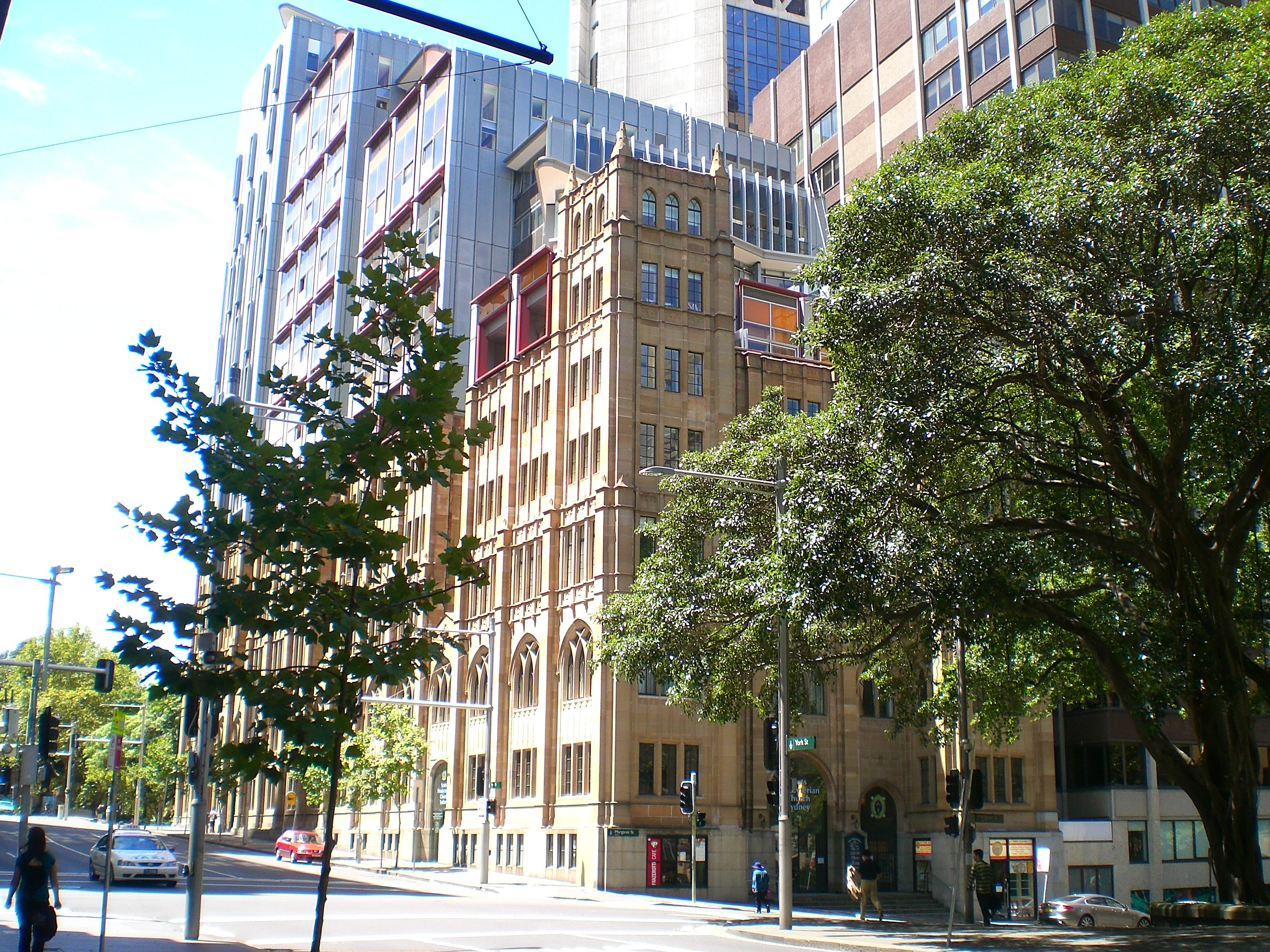
The current church, pictured in 2008.

A complex series of real estate transactions, land swaps and compensation agreements enabled the Presbyterian Church to reconstruct their church and offices on the original but enlarged site, facing both Lang Park and Wynyard Park, with frontages to Jamieson, York, and Margaret Streets. An architectural competition was held in 1927 for designs for a new Presbyterian Assembly Hall and associated offices. The brief called for a building which would be a monument appropriate to the universal character and inherent nobility of Presbyterianism; a material consummation of the church's pioneer efforts in this new world of Australia, and an appreciation of the substance and vitality which actuate the church towards problems of the future. Twenty-seven designs were submitted in the first stage of the competition and were judged by Norman Weekes. The winning design was selected in May 1928 but it was not until April 1929 that tenders were called and work commenced on the site in July 1929.

On completion the Church and Assembly Hall became a popular venue for both ecclesiastic and secular activities. The new church could accommodate 1,350 people, and tablets and monuments from the old church were incorporated in the new building. However, the decision to co-locate the church administration in the same building as the new church would cause numerous issues in the decades to come.

By the 1930s, the church had suffered a period of declining congregations, during which it had, according to the church's interim moderator, "almost passed out of existence". In response, it instituted a policy of not having a permanent minister, but instead engaging ministers from Scotland for six-month terms. This was reported to have been successful in driving interest in the church, which in 1935 was described as having "the largest [collection], possibly, of any Presbyterian church in Australia". In 1956, Malcolm Mackay became the first Australian-born minister at the church.

Throughout the decades following the construction of the new church, the church struggled with tensions relating to the fact that it did not control its own building. The original congregation trustees of the church had transferred control of the new building to the General Assembly of the Presbyterian Church on the provision that suitable arrangements would be made for carrying on the operations of the congregation. However, the result of the agreement was that the church had a limited right of occupancy over the building, and could only use it on specific days. This caused a long-running dispute across several decades, finally resulting in legal action and the church vacating the building in the c. 1970s. The congregation initially moved to St Patrick's Church, moving thereafter to several other buildings in Sydney.

By the 1990s, there were questions over the building's future, and its owner, the Presbyterian Church of New South Wales, initiated a series of redevelopment proposals. By 1998, when the last tenants were evicted, it was home to an 80-person congregation, which was forced to move to a church in Devonshire Street, artists and community groups, who were confined to the first two floors, with the upper storeys having been closed for some years. By the time of its eventual redevelopment, it had undergone several years of disuse and had been deconsecrated. In 1992, the church proposed to immediately demolish the building and build an 18-storey office complex, which met with strong Sydney City Council opposition and a trade union "green ban" and eventually did not proceed. In 1995, it was proposed to develop 13-storey office complex behind the existing facade, which collapsed when the intended tenant, the private training institute Australian Academy, withdrew from the proposal. Proposals continued throughout the remainder of the 1990s. In 2001, the Presbyterian Church of New South Wales sold the then-disused church site to a subsidiary of developer Westpoint Corporation, retaining a strata title over the existing church building, which was to be retained in any redevelopment. It was eventually redeveloped in 2005, with 148 apartments built on top of the existing church. The restoration, funded by the redevelopment, faced challenges due to the building's disused state: contractors responsible for the renovation described "leaky ceilings, crumbling sandstone and damaged timber and metalwork", and having to sift through the contents of a floor "strewn with rubbish", among other issues. The restoration won the 2006 MBA Construction Award for restoration of an historic building up to $5 million and the 2006 RAIA NSW Multiple Housing Award.

After several years without an active congregation, a new multi-generational multi-cultural church began in 2017.

== Description ==
Scots Church, located opposite Wynyard Park, diagonally opposite St Phillip's Church, has three main components: The Assembly Hall, secondary meeting halls and offices for use by the church, and office space for general leasing. The Assembly Hall is a large, two storey, elliptical space of unique design located in the middle of the building and occupying the full width of the site. The facade is designed in Inter-War Gothic Revival style with ashlar sandstone and a granite base. It comprises five floors with a raised central section of six floors on the north and south facade. The long elevation is divided into three bays separated by recessed courts. Each bay is divided into three divisions. The lower two floors have arched windows with the recessed bays marked by pediments. The upper facade comprises a series of tripartite flathead windows, with bay divisions expressed by buttresses. Gothic detailing in the form of gargoyles, quatrefoil tracery, and sandstone proliferate.

== Significance ==
Scots Church is a six-storey building of Inter-War Gothic Revival style. Scots Church has exceptional historic importance for its ability to embody the longevity of the association of this site with the Presbyterian Church. As well as recalling the early nineteenth-century history of this area as Church Hill, the building also has a powerful ability to reflect the impact made on the city by the construction of the Sydney Harbour Bridge. The building is important in the professional work of the noted architectural partnership of Rosenthal, Rutledge and Beattie. The building is architecturally significant as a rare and outstanding example of a highly intact original commercial Gothic exterior and an interior of high quality design with outstanding potential, due to its intact condition, to be maintained in its original state. The building is well resolved in its detailing in both its interior and exterior, and is particularly noted for its unique auditorium design. The building is aesthetically significant for its contribution as a landmark building to the Wynyard Square streetscape. It is also significant as the winner of the 1927 competition judged by N. Weekes. The building is socially significant as a popular venue for both ecclesiastical and secular activities, over many years. The Assembly Hall has considerable social importance for its contribution to the cultural diversity of the city.

== See also ==
- List of Presbyterian churches in Sydney
- Australian non-residential architectural styles
