= Grace Removals =

Australian Removals company

- Industry: Removals
- Founded: 1911
- Founder: Grace Bros
- Headquarters: Sydney, Australia
- Area served: Australia
- Parent: GCW Holdings
- Website: www.grace.com.au

Grace Removals is an Australian removals company.

== History ==
Grace Removals was established in 1911 when retailer Grace Bros established a furniture removal division in Sydney. In the mid-1960s it expanded to operate in all states in Australia. In 1984, Grace Removals was purchased by Brambles. In 1994 it was sold to Jim Thompson, the founder and owner of the Crown Worldwide Group.

For many years, Grace Removals sponsored advertising at the end of the credits of several Australian soap operas produced by the Grundy Organisation, including the international cult serial, Prisoner: Cell Block H (Ten Network; 1979-1986). The advertisement was cut out of international broadcasts of Prisoner, however, they can be seen on the subsequent DVD release of the entire series.

Other Grundy productions with Grace Removals sponsorship slides include The Young Doctors (Nine Network, 1976–1983) and The Restless Years (Network Ten, 1977–1981).
