= Westfield Bondi Junction =

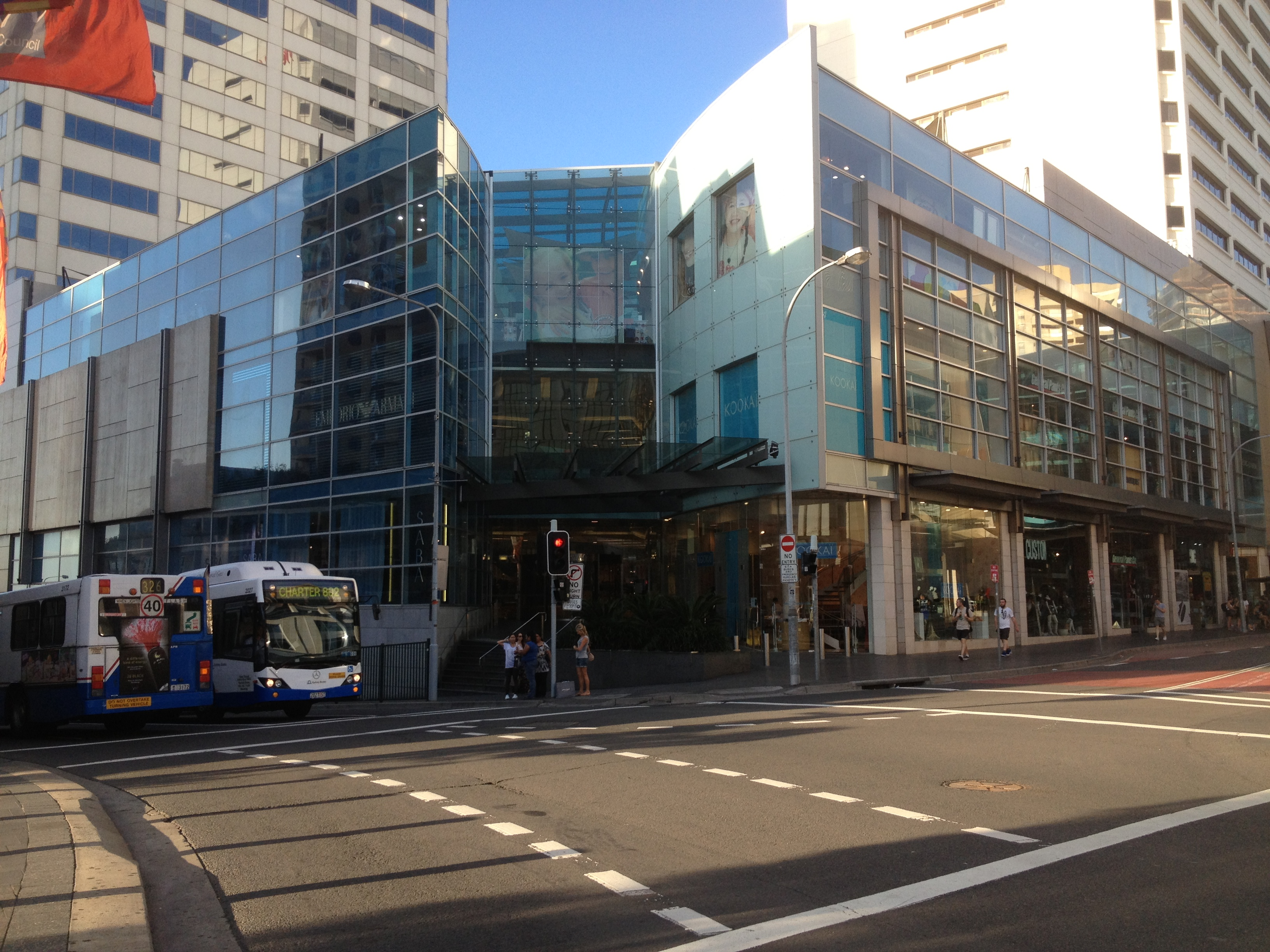
- Westfield Bondi Junction
- Location: Bondi Junction, New South Wales, Australia
- Coordinates: 33°53′29″S 151°15′04″E
- Address: 500 Oxford Street
- Opened: 1934 (Grace Bros); 1970; 56 years ago (Carousel Centre); 1976 (Bondi Junction Plaza); August 2004 (Westfield Bondi Junction)
- Manager: Scentre Group
- Owner: Scentre Group
- Num. of stores: 331
- Num. of anchor tenants: 8
- Floor area: 131,259 m^{2} (1,412,860 sq ft)
- Floors: 7
- Parking: 3,304 spaces
- Public transit: Bondi Junction railway station
- Website: westfield.com.au/bondijunction/

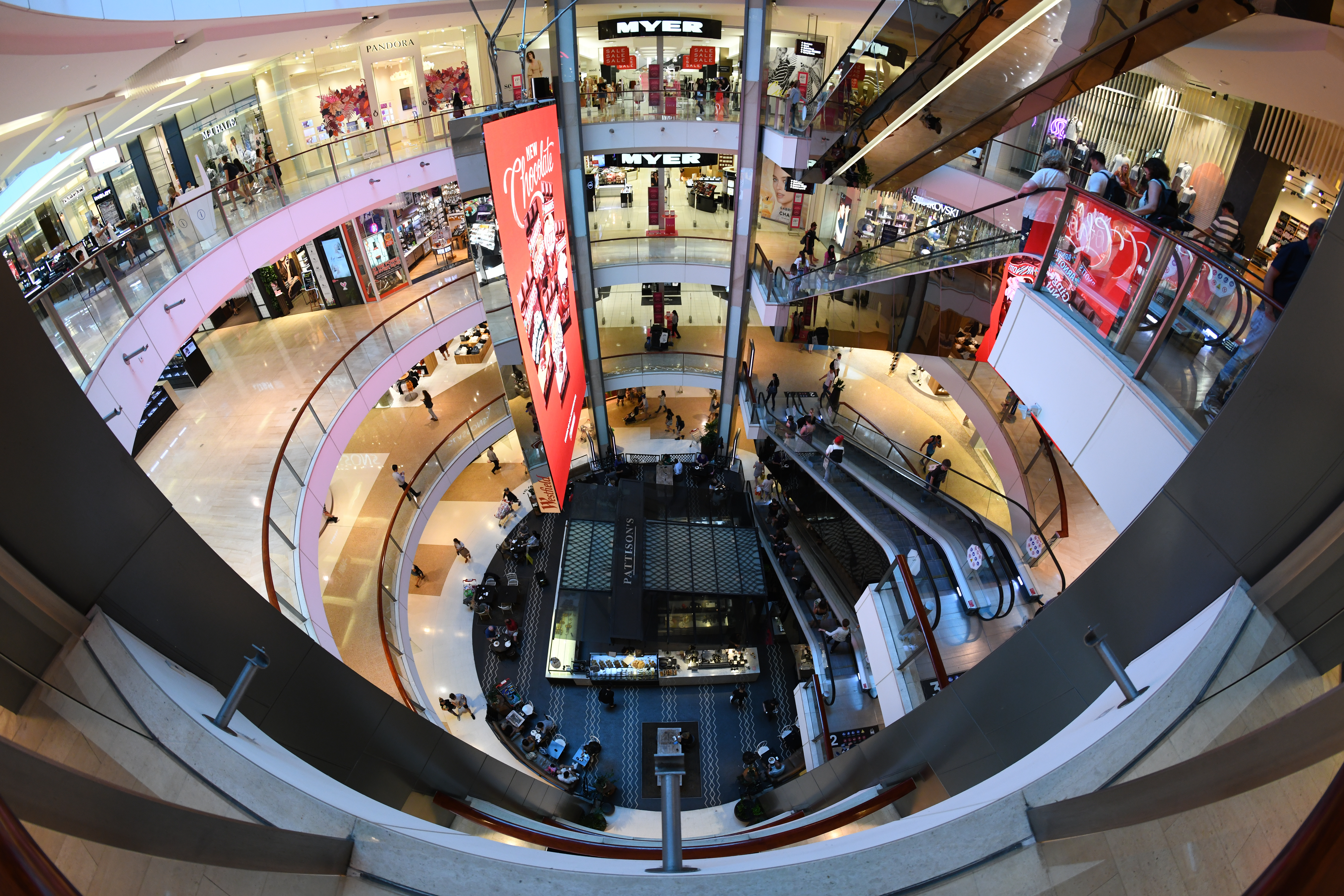
The atrium, looking downwards

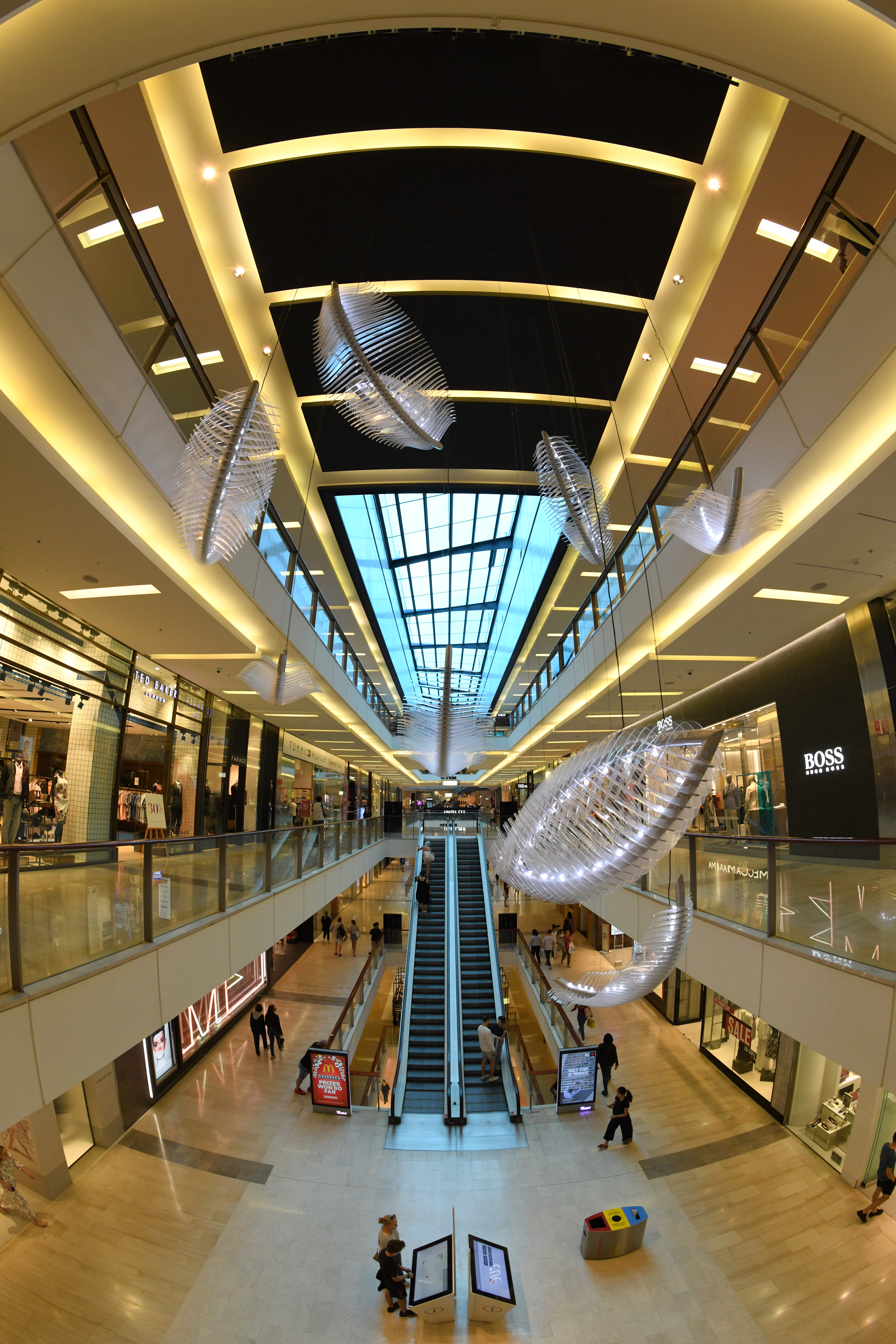
Interior of Westfield Bondi Junction (2019)

Westfield Bondi Junction is a large shopping centre in the suburb of Bondi Junction in the Eastern Suburbs of Sydney.

== History ==
Westfield Bondi Junction is built on land that was originally by occupied Grace Bros, Carousel Centre and Bondi Junction Plaza.

The oldest of these was a Grace Bros store opened in 1934 on the site of the former Hoyts Coronet picture theatre on Oxford Street. In 1957, the Grace Bros building was replaced by a large building designed by Morrow and Gordon, and with parking for 120 cars; the budget was £500,000, according to the Sydney Morning Herald. In the early 1970s, the store's striking Modernist exterior was documented by prominent Sydney photographer Max Dupain. Grace Bros dominated shopping in the region until Bondi Junction Plaza was completed in 1976.

In the early 1970s, a shopping centre known as The Carousel was opened. This three-level centre featured a Safeway supermarket (later Woolworths), around 50 stores and notably for the time, a food court. The centre was characterised by a large carousel in the middle atrium of the ground floor (which gave the centre its name).

With the promise of the Eastern Suburbs railway line, a larger shopping centre was built by AMP and the Uniting Church (who owned part of the site). This shopping centre, called Bondi Junction Plaza opened in 1976 and included a David Jones department store. In 1979, the first of two commercial office towers ("Plaza Tower I") was opened above the site. The second ("Plaza Tower II"), larger tower, opened in 1985. Both these towers are over 80 m in height. The construction of the shopping centre was a watershed, as Australia had no other commercial shopping projects of such scale during the 1970s.

The Public Transport Commission originally intended to construct a shopping complex around Bondi Junction railway station and link this to the Bondi Junction Plaza development by means of a tunnel. The tunnel was opposed by the local Chamber of Commerce and subsequently dropped together with the entire commercial development in 1976 when the railway was reassessed in a cost-cutting exercise.

In 1994, Westfield Group bought a 50% stake in Bondi Junction Plaza from AMP and renamed it Westfield Bondi Junction Plaza. They began planning a redevelopment of the shopping centre and the Grace Brothers site opposite. The first Development Application was lodged with the two councils in 1996 due to the site being located on the border of Waverley and Woollahra councils. The councils were unable to reach a joint conclusion between themselves and Westfield on the development. While they agreed in principle to the development, they variously objected to the scale of the project. In 1997, the Minister for Urban Affairs and Planning, Craig Knowles, approved the initial concept for a redeveloped shopping centre which was then dragged on into 1998 before the NSW government assumed planning control of the project. It was subsequently approved with minor modification. Westfield did not begin development immediately, in view of the then imminent 2000 Olympics.

In 2000, Westfield bought AMP's remaining stake in Bondi Junction Plaza and also purchased the adjacent Carousel centre (which by the late 1980s, had already been linked in with the Plaza shopping centre, by a series of internal walkways). Plans were amended to incorporate this centre in the redevelopment, further delaying the project.

Following the purchase of the Carousel Centre in 2000, a new expanded scheme was submitted for approval. In 2001, the New South Wales Minister for Planning, Frank Sartor approved the development despite the two councils' objections. The scale of the development was the main reason for the delayed approval process.

This redevelopment known as the 'black label' included the demolition of the existing Grace Brothers store and redevelopment of Carousel and Bondi Junction Plaza. Both Grace Bros and Woolworths closed in preparation for this development, whilst David Jones continued to trade whilst undergoing a facelift which included its CBD version of its food hall which was the first to be established in a suburban store. This development included two levels of shops underground reaching 25 metres below as well as three levels of shops and four levels of parking above ground on both sides of Oxford Street. A 70-metre tunnel and a 12-metre wide 2 storey pedestrian bridge over Oxford Street were also included. The development also included two food courts, one on level 3 known as the 'Terrace Food Court' and the other food court on level 5 with a balcony overlooking the CBD and Eastern Suburbs.

The redevelopment opened in stages from November 2003 to August 2004 and the centre was subsequently renamed Westfield Bondi Junction. This development made Westfield Bondi Junction one of the largest shopping complexes in the Sydney metropolitan area. The development featured David Jones, Grace Bros (rebranded to Myer in 2004), Target (rebranded to Kmart in 2021), Coles, Woolworths, Harvey Norman, JB Hi-Fi, Rebel Sport, Hugo Boss, Greater Union (which was renamed to Event Cinemas in 2010) and 458 retailers.

Westfield Bondi Junction has been blamed for the downturn in trade in surrounding shopping hubs. The nearby Oxford Street, in Paddington and Darlinghurst is one example. Retail trade in that location dropped 30% in the four months after the opening of the shopping centre with other locations in Double Bay and Woollahra experiencing similar downturns in trade.

In July 2014, as part of a restructure of the Westfield Group, it came under the control of the Scentre Group.

Since 2012, Westfield Bondi Junction has seen the opening of many new international fashion retailers. Spanish retailer Zara opened on 13 September 2012 on the space vacated by Borders. British retailer Topshop and Topman opened on 24 March 2016, however the store closed in May 2019. On 27 August 2016, Swedish retailer H&M opened its sixth store in NSW at the centre. The store opened on the former terrace food court. On 17 September 2020, Japanese retailer Uniqlo opened its 24th Australian store at the centre.

On 23 October 2025 TK Maxx opened its store on the old Rebel space on level 5.

== Tenants ==
Westfield Bondi Junction has 131,259m² of floor space. The major retailers include David Jones, Myer, Kmart, TK Maxx, Coles, Harris Farm Markets, Woolworths, Uniqlo, Zara, Harvey Norman, JB Hi-Fi, Rebel and Event Cinemas.

== Transport ==
Bondi Junction station is a short walk from the centre.

Westfield Bondi Junction has bus connections operated by Transdev John Holland and Transit Systems to the Sydney CBD, Eastern Suburbs and Inner West.

Westfield Bondi Junction has multi level car parks with 3,304 spaces.

== Incidents and accidents ==
- On 9 June 2010, a man fell to his death on level 4 outside Myer after sitting on the railing outside the store.
- On 16 December 2015, wild storms caused a roof to collapse and water damage in the centre around 1:30pm. The roof collapse occurred above Event Cinemas and left ground floor covered in water. The centre was evacuated and one person was taken to St Vincent’s Hospital after being struck by falling debris, but they are understood to have escaped with only minor injuries. The centre reopened for trade the next day with some areas closed off.
- On 27 January 2017, a body was found in the fire stairwell by a maintenance worker. The body was identified as a 71 year old man who was reported missing on 6 January 2017 after being locked in a stairwell and was found three weeks later.
- On 16 December 2020, a young woman was hit by a bus on Grafton Street outside just Meriton Suites and Westfield Bondi Junction at 10:15am. Paramedics attempted to save the woman, however she was later declared dead at the scene. The bus driver was assessed and treated for shock and Grafton St was closed between Newland and Grosvenor Streets in both directions.
- On 13 April 2024, at least 18 people were stabbed at the shopping centre, six of whom died from the injuries. The perpetrator was shot and killed by a police officer.
