= Justin Hemmes =

Australian businessman

- Born: 27 August 1972 (age 54); Sydney, New South Wales, Australia
- Education: The Scots College
- Occupation: CEO of Merivale Group
- Partners: Carla McKinnon (m. 2012; div. 2015) Kate Fowler (m. 2015; div. 2018)
- Children: 3

Justin Hemmes (born 27 August 1972) is an Australian businessman, heir to the House of Merivale family fortune and principal of the Merivale Group that owns approximately 100 pubs, hotels, restaurants and other venues across Australia.

== Biography ==
Hemmes is the son of John Hemmes (1931–2015) and Merivale Hemmes. He was educated at The Scots College.

== Personal life ==
From 2012 to 2015, Hemmes was in a relationship with Carla McKinnon, a yoga teacher. From 2015 to 2018, he was in a relationship with Kate Fowler, and they had two daughters together.

Hemmes is in a long term relationship with Madeline Holtznagel. They have one child born in 2025.

In 2023, it was reported that Hemmes had purchased two Byron Bay properties at an estimated cost of A$38 million.

== Net worth ==
Hemmes and family debuted on the Financial Review 2018 Rich List with an estimated net worth of A$951 million. As of May 2025, the Hemmes family's net worth was A$1.58 billion, according to the 2025 Rich List.

Year	Financial Review Rich List		Forbes Australia's 50 Richest	
Year	Rank	Net worth (A$)	Rank	Net worth (US$)
2018	78 ▲	$951 million ▲		
2019	88 ▼	$1.06 billion ▲		
2020	101 ▼	$1.00 billion ▼		
2021	97 ▲	$1.21 billion ▲		
2022	128 ▼	$1.10 billion ▼		
2023	102 ▲	$1.39 billion ▲		
2024		$1.50 billion ▲		
2025	113	$1.58 billion ▲		

Legend
Icon	Description
Steady	Has not changed from the previous year
▲	Has increased from the previous year
▼	Has decreased from the previous year

== See also ==
- The Hermitage, Vaucluse
