= National House =

Historic building in Sydney

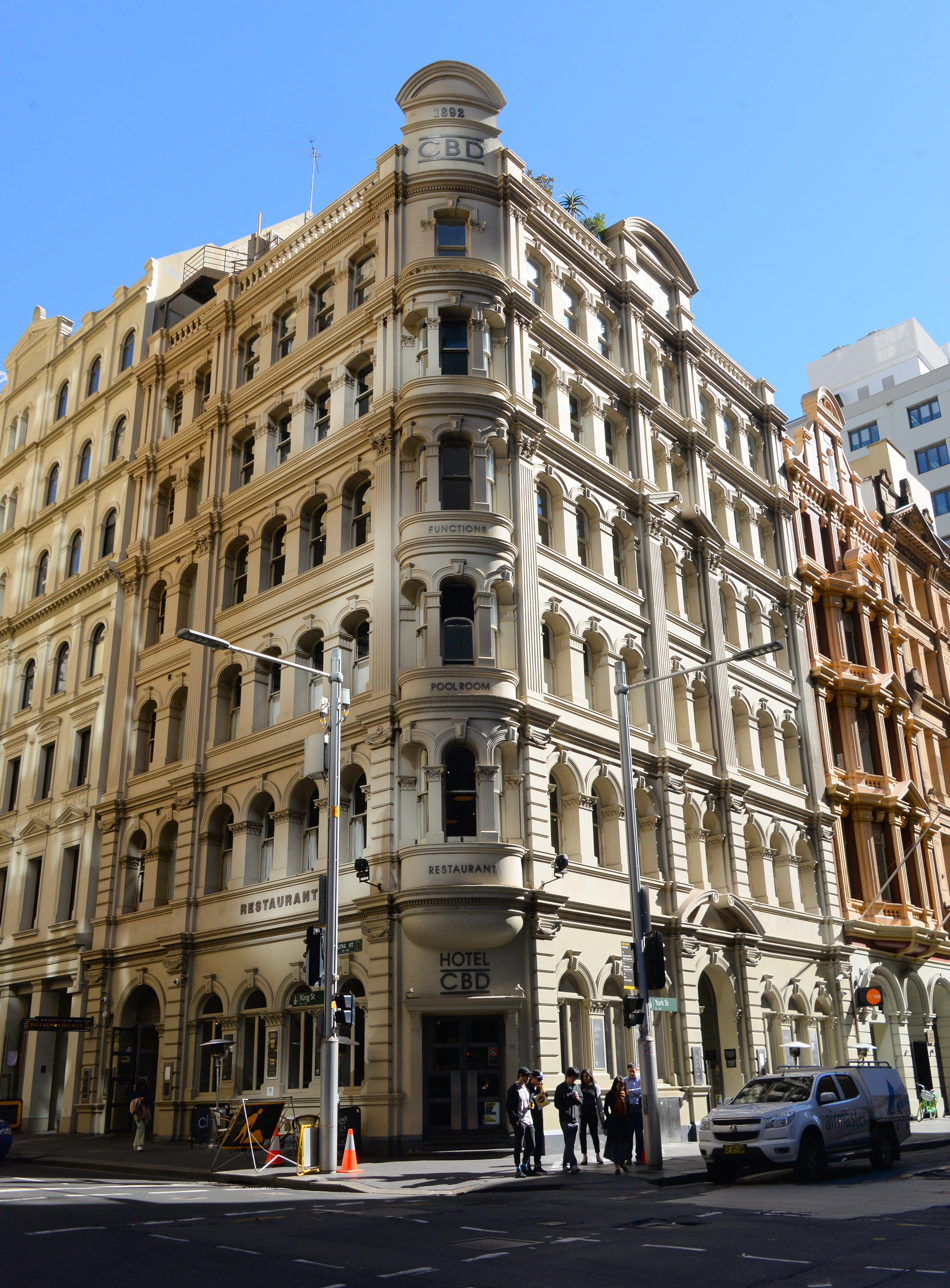
- The National House as viewed on the corner of King Street

- Location within Sydney Location within Australia
- 33.8685°S 151.2058°E
- Location: 75 York Street, Sydney central business district, City of Sydney, New South Wales, Australia

Site notes
- Owner: Merivale Group

New South Wales Heritage Register
- Official name: National House
- Type: State heritage (built)
- Designated: 2 April 1999
- Reference no.: 581
- Type: Historic site

National House is a heritage-listed former warehouse and bank branch and now pub located at 75 York Street, on the corner of King Street, in the Sydney central business district, in the City of Sydney local government area of New South Wales, Australia. It now operates as the Hotel CBD. It was added to the New South Wales State Heritage Register on 2 April 1999.

== History ==
In 1891 a two-storey brick and stone building licensed as the Bristol Hotel occupied this site. The property was purchased by Sydney investor John Thomas Neale in early 1892. Neale was born in NSW in 1823 and started in business as a butcher and cattle dealer but went on to amass a significant fortune. He was an alderman on the City of Sydney council in 1857 and an investor in a number of banks and insurance companies as well as owner of a large amount of real estate. When he died in 1897 he left more than £18,000 to charity.

In June 1892 the Australasian Builder & Contractors' News reported that architect Charles Hellmrich was calling tenders for the excavation of the basement of the new building. The building is known, however, to have been the work of Hellmrich's partner, James Alexander Meek. While most of Meek's work was of a domestic nature, he was also responsible for the erection of a number of large warehouses, in particular this warehouse at the corner of King and York Streets. The building was first listed in Sands' Sydney Directories in 1894, as leased to Murray Brothers, tweed and clothing manufacturers, with other tenants including wool merchants and manufacturers and warehousemen.

The building continued to be used as a warehouse and remained in ownership of Neale's descendants until 1920 when it was sold to the National Bank of Australia and converted into a bank branch. It remained the premises of the National Bank for many years. In 1995, it was adapted into the Hotel CBD as one of the prominent Hemmes family's first entries into the hospitality industry.

== Description ==
National House is a six-storey building with a well-detailed facade retaining original detailing to all levels. The east elevation is symmetrical with a central scrolled broken pedimented entry. Above the door, paired windows occur which are pedimented at the fourth and sixth floor. On the south elevation the facade is asymmetrically with the entry located on the end bay. The 1929 entry to the bank on the corner beneath a projecting bay with three windows remains. All doorways are rusticated. The taller ground floor incorporates a dentilated entablature course which incorporates the door pediment. The windows up to level four are semicircular and flathead windows are found on levels five and six. The parapet is balustered with pediments rising above the York Street and corner entrance. The plan is rectangular with windows to both sides. The interior has been remodelled but the original structural cast iron columns which become progressively more elaborate from level four down to the ground level remain.

== Significance ==
National House has a well-detailed facade retaining original detailing to all levels. The east elevation is symmetrical with a central scrolled broken pedimented entry. Above the door, paired windows occur which are pedimented at the fourth and sixth floor. On the south elevation the facade is asymmetrically with the entry located on the end bay. The 1929 entry to the bank on the corner beneath a projecting bay with three windows remains. All doorways are rusticated. The taller ground floor incorporates a dentilated entablature course which incorporates the door pediment. The windows up to level four are semicircular and flathead windows are found on levels five and six. The parapet is balustered with pediments rising above the York Street and corner entrance. The plan is rectangular with windows to both sides. The interior has been remodelled but the original structural cast iron columns which become progressively more elaborate from level four down to the ground level remain.

== Heritage listing ==
National House was listed on the New South Wales State Heritage Register on 2 April 1999.

== See also ==
- Australian non-residential architectural styles
