= Grace Bros =

Defunct Australian department store chain

- Type: Subsidiary
- Industry: Retail
- Founded: 1885; 141 years ago
- Founder: Albert Edward Grace; Joseph Neal Grace
- Defunct: 2004; 22 years ago
- Fate: Acquired by Myer
- Headquarters: Sydney, Australia
- Number of locations: 25 stores (2004)
- Products: Department Store
- Parent: Coles Myer (1983–2004)
- Website: www.gracebros.com.au

Grace Bros was an Australian department store chain, founded in 1885. It was bought by Myer (later Coles Myer) in 1983. There were 25 stores across New South Wales and the Australian Capital Territory plus a few in Victoria, until they were re-branded under the Myer name in 2004.

== History ==
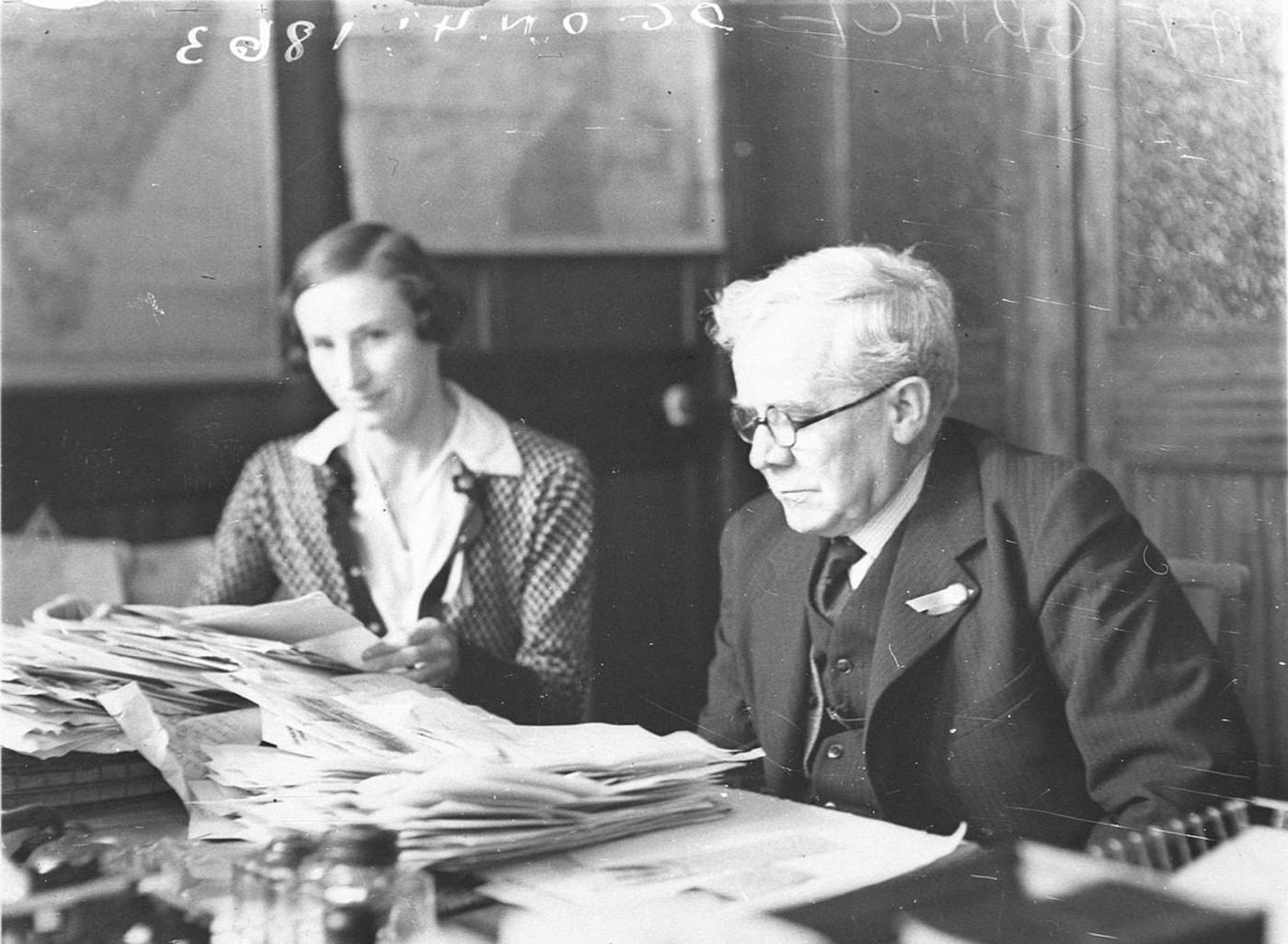
Albert Edward Grace, the head of Grace Bros department store and his secretary in his office

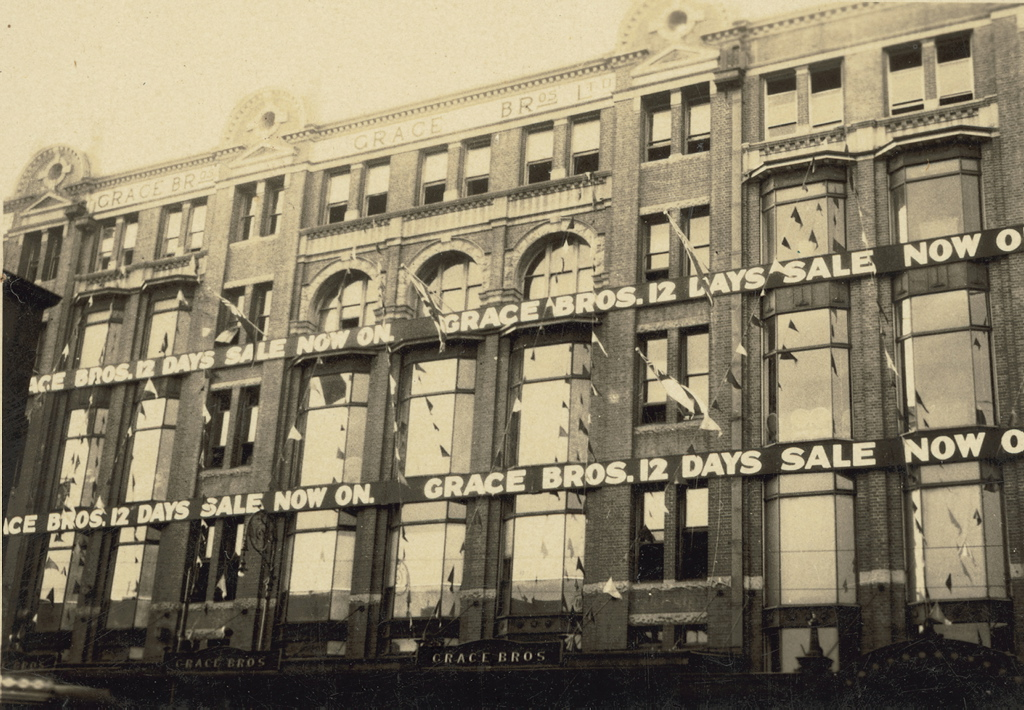
Broadway Grace Bros store in the 1930s

Grace Bros had a long and rich history of retailing in New South Wales, especially in Sydney following its founding by the Grace brothers, Albert Edward and Joseph Neal Grace, in 1885. The two brothers migrated from England in the 1880s and sold goods door-to-door. In 1885, they opened their first small shop in George Street, Sydney and by 1906, they had opened a five-storey building at Broadway (now the site of the Broadway Shopping Centre). In 1931, Joseph Neal Grace died and Albert Grace became managing director of Grace Bros. Prior to his death in 1938, Albert Grace planned suburban expansion of the Grace Bros stores from the city, a move which is considered the reason Grace Bros survived when many of their contemporaries perished such as Anthony Hordern & Sons and Mark Foy's. Isabel Grace died in 1970, aged 86.

=== Broadway ===
Sydney's major Grace Bros was located on Broadway. Through several different stores at varied locations in the city, the store first came to Bay Street in 1904. Subsequent additions and property purchases over the years culminated in the existing buildings being completed in 1923. Grace Bros boasted a store with, among many features, "three and a half acres of furniture"! The Grace auditorium dominated the social life of Sydney with dances, fashion parades, children's events displays and pantomimes held within it. 1954 saw the Royal Visit of Queen Elizabeth II with the Broadway stores extensively decorated. However, the centre of Sydney shopping gradually moved from Broadway into the current CBD around Market and Pitt streets, and Grace Bros vacated the Broadway store in 1992. The building was resurrected as a multimillion-dollar retail and cinema complex in 1998.

=== The Grace Building ===
In 1926, the Grace Brothers, Albert Edward and Joseph Neal Grace, purchased a block of land on the corner of York, Clarence and King streets in Sydney, on which they would build the Grace Building, the jewel in the crown of their retail empire. They believed the site was perfectly positioned for the building they planned would become "The Showpiece of the Company", with new public transport routes and the coming Sydney Harbour Bridge turning York and Clarence streets in the major city thoroughfares. Company letterhead even showed the building as being "...on the Harbour Bridge Highway." Broadway had been affected by the shift of the city's commercial district toward Circular Quay and the changing public transport routes away from Sydney's south end, and so the Grace Building was to be the company's saviour. The Grace Building was officially opened by Sydney Lord Mayor Ernest Marks on 3 July 1930.

York Street never became the shopping thoroughfare the Grace Brothers had envisaged and, combined with the effects of the Great Depression of the 1930s, the building never lived up to expectations. By the onset of World War II Grace Bros was experiencing difficulty in leasing office suites and much of the space was allocated to government departments. In 1943 the Grace Building was requisitioned under national security regulations by the federal government for use as headquarters by the Supreme Commander of allied forces in the south-west Pacific, General Douglas MacArthur. In 1945, the Grace Building was compulsorily acquired by the Commonwealth. In 1995, it was purchased by the Low Yat Group of Kuala Lumpur for adaptive reuse as a 382-room hotel, opening in 1997.

=== Suburban store growth ===
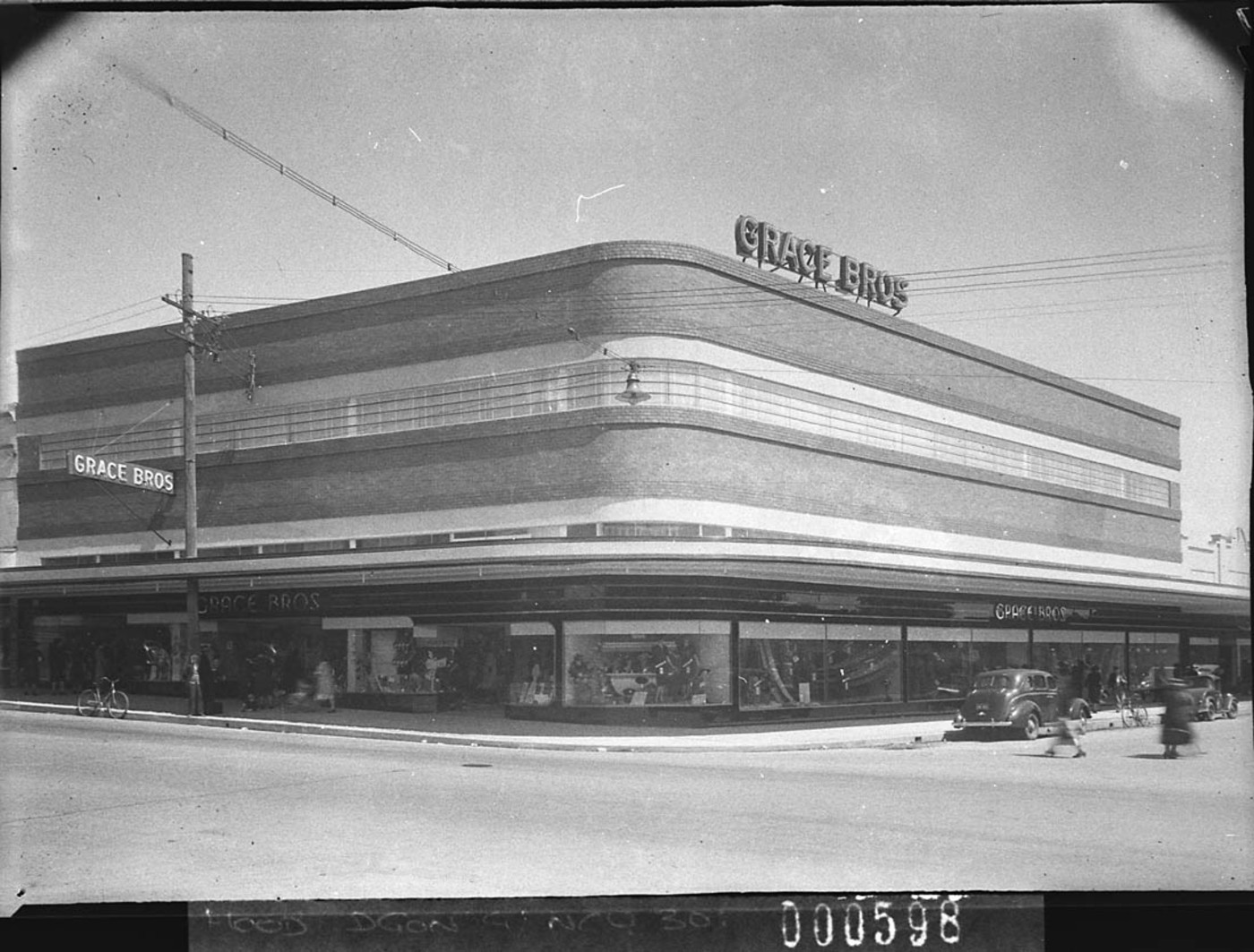
Grace Bros, Parramatta in 1939

Grace Bros opened two small stores in suburban Sydney (now in Westfield Parramatta and Westfield Bondi Junction respectively) as early as in 1933; these stores were completely rebuilt and expanded in 1957 into the first department stores in Australia designed with the family car in mind.

In 1965, the Roselands Shopping Centre opened as one of the first major shopping centres in Australia. The centrepiece was a large Grace Bros department store. Suburban stores were subsequently opened at Stockland Mall Maroubra (became a clearance outlet from September 1994, closed 2002), Westfield Mount Druitt (opened 1973, closed June 2004), Westfield Hurstville (closed 24 January 2015), Westfield Miranda (also featuring a "Grace Bros Sport" concept store in the late 1990s), Westfield Parramatta, Westfield Penrith, Ryde (closed 1985), Westfield Bondi Junction, Westfield Burwood (now a David Jones) (a tiny co-existing Grace Bros ladies and fashion accessories store operated between 1981-1983 when it moved into and re-branded the existing Myer location, it was around the corner and separate from the Myer store on level 2 of Westfield Burwood), Blacktown (opened 1973, closed April 2022), Castle Hill, Westfield Hornsby (opened 1979, closed January 2020), Westfield Liverpool, Carlingford Court (now a Target), Westfield Chatswood, Macquarie Centre and Westfield Warringah Mall.

The Castle Hill store which opened on 11 August 2001, was the final store to be opened under the Grace Bros brand and was also the final store to be designed in NSW, with a team at the Roselands support office overseeing all the plans and development. Around the same time, Grace Bros brought the Megamart furniture and electrical brand into New South Wales, opening superstores in Auburn, Casula (opened 2002 at 8,500sqm) and Alexandria (opened 2003).

=== Country stores ===
Over the years, Grace Bros opened and also acquired other stores as part of its expansion. Notable was the acquisition of publicly listed Queanbeyan and Canberra retailer, JB Young's during late 1979. The JB Young's stores traded under this name until mid 1986 when rebranded to Grace Bros. By acquiring JB Young's, Grace Bros also became the owner of the value positioned, apparel and manchester retailer Fosseys and benefited from stores JB Young's had acquired in their 1974 purchase of NSW retailer John Meagher & Co.

There was a specific "Country Division" within Grace Bros based in Canberra, established in 1985 at the time of the name change from Youngs to Grace Bros. The Country Division was responsible for regional merchandising at the stores including Kingston, Woden Valley, Dickson, Civic, Fyshwick, Queanbeyan, Goulburn, Cooma, and Batemans Bay. The Country Division also included former Myer (some of which were branded as The Western Stores in Bathurst, Dubbo, Gosford, Orange, Wagga Wagga, Young, Cowra, Newcastle, Cessnock and Tamworth. New country stores were opened in Wollongong, Charlestown, Erina (relocated from Gosford). Both Newcastle and Cessnock closed when new store opened at Charlestown in 1989.

Some of the stores that have closed include Goulburn (closed 1995), Ulladulla, Nowra (closed 2003), Tamworth (converted in 2003 to a Target), Bathurst (closed 2004), Cooma, Queanbeyan, Bairnsdale (after becoming a Myer, converted to a Kmart in 2004). In 1982 there were plans to open a Grace Bros. in Strathpine, Queensland but due to the take over of Myer NSW by Grace Bros. Holdings the store opened at the Strathpine Centre as a Myer in 1983 and remained opened until 2007. Myer Wollongong (Wollongong Central) closed on 3 October 2016. Myer Orange closed on 29 January 2017, after 167 years of trading through various owners, 21 of those years it was branded Grace Bros.

=== Taken over ===
In July 1982, Grace Bros sold its 57% shareholding in Norman Ross to Waltons. In April 1983 Grace Bros purchased most of Myer's New South Wales stores excluding Albury, Chatswood Chase, Gordon, Lismore, Miranda and Tweed Heads.

Having been the subject of a battle for control with the Adelaide Steamship Company, Bond Corporation, FAI Insurance, Myer, Westfield and Woolworths all buying and selling sizeable blocks of shares in 1982/83, Myer's takeover bid for Grace Bros was successful in June 1983. The Myer store on Market and Pitt Streets in Sydney became the main Grace Bros store. In 1985, the company became a division of Coles Myer, and the Grace Bros stores effectively merged with the 35 Victorian based Myer stores. In February 2004 a marketing decision was made to rebrand all the Grace Bros stores as Myer stores.

Up until July 2024, despite being a defunct retail chain, the Grace Bros. website was accessible and would only show an old photo of young women who are shopping for glassware.

== Grace Removals ==
Grace Removals was established by Albert Edward and Joseph Neal Grace in Sydney in 1911. In 1984 it was sold to Brambles who on-sold it in 1994 to Crown Worldwide Group.

== Grace Information Management ==
Grace also provides information and records management services through its 'Grace Information' division (Grace Records Management (Australia) Pty Ltd). The division operates more than 29 secure records storage facilities across Australia, located in or servicing every capital city and regional centre.
