= Broadway Shopping Centre =

Shopping centre located in Sydney, New South Wales

Broadway Sydney
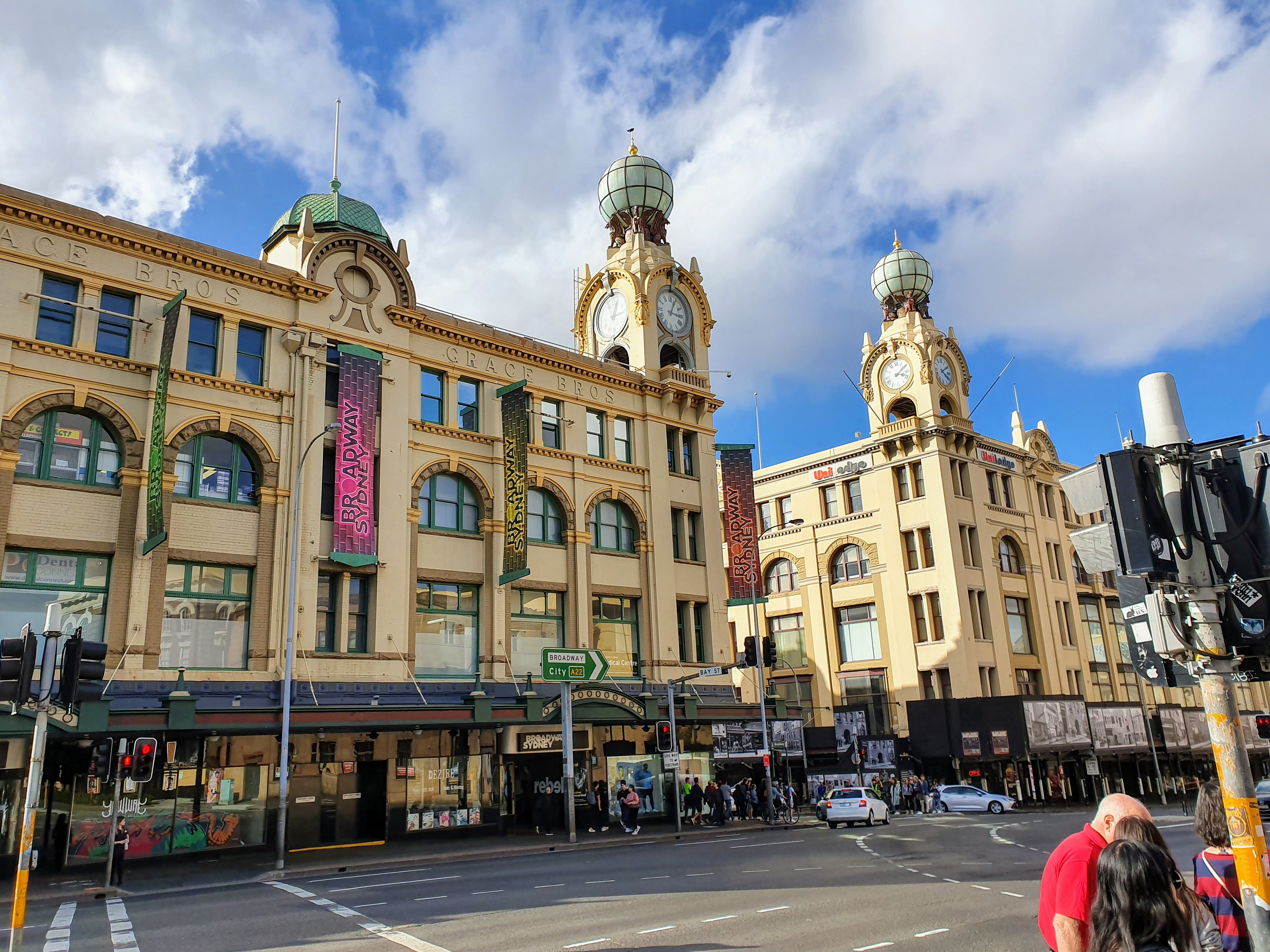
- Broadway Shopping Centre building from Parramatta Road
- Location: Sydney, Australia
- Coordinates: 33°53′2″S 151°11′38″E
- Owner: Mirvac
- Website: www.broadwaysydney.com.au

Broadway Shopping Centre is a shopping centre in Sydney, located in the Broadway locality. It features a 500-seat Food Court and Hoyts 12-screen cinema complex along with major retailers Kmart, Coles, Target, Aldi, H&M, JB Hi-Fi, Harvey Norman, Harris Farm Markets, Rebel Sport, and over 100 specialty shops.

== History ==
The Broadway shopping centre is located in one of the two former Grace Bros buildings on Broadway which opened in 1923, the other building now housing university student accommodation. Walker Corporation undertook the restoration of the buildings to include university student accommodation and a shopping centre in 1997. The shopping centre opened in 1998 and was owned and managed by Walker Corporation until its sale to Mirvac in December 2006. In 2007, an additional floor was added to the original centre.

In 2015, major upgrades to the centre commenced, costing $55 million. The upgrades, completed in August 2016, added a revamped food court, and new fashion stores.

== Incidents ==
On 12 February 2008, just after 1:30 pm a fire was reported due to an electrical substation fire in the lower levels of the shopping centre. No one was injured, however emergency services rescued shoppers trapped in lifts, which had no power due to the fire.

On 17 June 2012, 69 year-old centre security guard Hans Schulz (a German native) was kicked to death after disturbing two intruders - a 32-year-old man from Randwick and a woman aged 27 from Maroubra - who had broken into a Wendy's Ice Cream Kiosk on the ground floor of the building. The pair were charged with manslaughter.

On 29 April 2016, hundreds of shoppers and workers had to be evacuated, after a fire broke out on level three.

== Transport ==
Broadway Shopping Centre is serviced by a bus stop on Parramatta Road and City Road outside the centre It is a 15 minute walk from Central railway station, which is accessed from using Bay Street.

Bicycle parking is provided at a bike rack in the Ground North Car Park (near the Francis Street entrance), or next to the zebra crossing on Bay Street.

The adjacent multi-level car park, accessible by Bay Street or Small Street, has over 1665 parking spaces.

=== Safety ===
The Transport for NSW Pyrmont Ultimo Transport Plan included a recommendation to "provide northern footpath continuity for pedestrians at Bay Street by pedestrianising Bay Street between Broadway and Grose Street". The February 2026 Greater Sydney Infrastructure Opportunities Plan stated there was "Planning in progress" by Transport for NSW to "Improve pedestrian safety, priority and amenity at Bay Street and Broadway", however in April 2026 Transport for NSW stated they have no plans to "upgrade the intersection of Broadway and Bay Street".
