= Merivale (company) =

Australian company

- Type: Privately held company
- Industry: Retail; Hospitality; Entertainment
- Founded: 1957; 69 years ago
- Founders: John & Merivale Hemmes
- Headquarters: Sydney, Australia
- Key people: Justin Hemmes (CEO)
- Services: Nightclubs; Pubs; Restaurants
- Number of employees: ~2,500 (2015)
- Website: Official website

Merivale is an Australian privately held company, with property assets involved in the entertainment and hospitality sectors, predominantly in Sydney, New South Wales.

== Fashion years ==
It was founded in 1957 in Sydney by John and Merivale Hemmes, initially as a millinery in Sydney's Boulevard Arcade, later expanding into clothing. In 1959, the first House of Merivale fashion store was established in the Theatre Royal in Castlereagh Street. It expanded into a chain with three stores in Pitt Street, two in Melbourne and one in Canberra.

== Hospitality and property diversification ==
Merivale diversified into both hospitality and property interests, acquiring the Angel Hotel building in Pitt Street, which included a restaurant that reopened as a boutique, and was the first item in a substantial property portfolio.

It expanded further into hospitality in the early 1990s with the Merivale restaurant in Potts Point, as it began winding down its fashion interests, closing the last fashion outlet in 1996.

Hemmes' son, Justin, took over the business in the mid-1990s and aggressively diversified into hospitality, operating more than 70 nightclubs, pubs and restaurants, primarily in Sydney, by 2020. Notable assets include Hotel CBD, the Newport Arms Hotel, the Royal Hotel, Bondi and the Slip Inn. In 2021, Merivale purchased the Lorne Hotel for A$38 million, expanding the company's reach into Victoria.

In 2019 a class action was commenced against Merivale, alleging A$129 million in under-payment of approximately 14,000 employees who were employed between December 2013 and December 2019. The litigants claimed that the employees were not paid for the significant overtime they were required to work, beyond the maximum allowance of 38 hours per week. Merivale denied the claims. On 30 March 2021, in a major loss to Merivale, Justice Thawley in the Federal Court ruled that the WorkChoices agreement was not validly approved. On 6 March 2024, Merivale, agreed to a A$18 million settlement without admitting wrongdoing. The settlement, allocates about half of the funds to cover legal costs and the litigation funder's commission, with $9.4 million earmarked for the affected workers.

== Anti-Palestinian Behaviour and Response ==
During 2025 Sydney Harbour Bridge protest, Jimmy’s Falafel in central Sydney denied dine-in servicing individuals wearing Palestinian Keffiyehs. In response Merivale said that Jimmy’s Falafel had welcomed many patrons wearing keffiyehs and hijabs throughout the day. But between 3:55 pm and 4:15 pm, staff got told to remove all political symbols, including flags and placards and the decision wasn't based on religion or political views but was a temporary safety measure.
