= Barzillai Quaife =

Australian minister and writer

Barzillai Quaife (29 December 1798 – 3 March 1873) was an English-born editor, Congregational and Presbyterian minister, bookseller and teacher active in both Australia and New Zealand. He was a fierce advocate for the rights of the Māori.

== Life ==
Born at Lenham in Kent, Quaife was the son of a farmer, Thomas Quaife, and his wife, Amelia Austin. He entered the Hoxton Academy in London in 1824; later he served as a teacher and minister in Collompton, Devon, and St Leonards-on-Sea, Sussex, among other locations. In 1835 Quaife submitted a "Plan to provide the New Settlement of South Australia with the means of Religious instruction on the Congregational principle" to the South Australian Colonization Commissioners; he was not, however, appointed under this plan, nor was he allowed to serve when he applied again in 1836. He did finally reach Adelaide in September 1839, with the assistance of George Fife Angas; here he established a Bible and tract depot and spent six months writing for Archibald Macdougall's Southern Australian, before being persuaded to establish his own paper in New Zealand.

Quaife and his family arrived at Kororareka (today Russell) on the Agenoria in May 1840. On 15 June of that year the first issue of the New Zealand Advertiser and Bay of Islands Gazette was published. It was the second newspaper to be printed in the colony, and contained government-issued material; nevertheless, Quaife exercised an editorial policy directly contrary to, and critical of, government policy. He voiced strong support for the rights of the Māori, and was displeased by poorly-performing public servants; most of his focus was on indigenous rights – especially regarding land – and criminal justice. He has been called "New Zealand's first public anti-racist"; among his harshest statements on the issue was one that "when…the Governor…lays it down as an axiom…that the natives have no independent right over their own property…we see no end – looking at the Cape as an example – of the catalogue of miseries which may be entailed on this inoffensive people". He further argued that the land act of August 1840, supported by governor George Gipps and allowing the governor of New South Wales to appoint commissioners to investigate land-related issues in New Zealand, was unenforceable and would lead to trouble.

It has been suggested that Quaife's personality, combined with a liberal education and experience with both a free colony and an unencumbered, openly critical press, meant that he was destined for problems with authority. In the event he came into conflict with the chief police magistrate and acting colonial secretary, Willoughby Shortland. Shortland was fresh from New South Wales, where the press was controlled, and in December 1840, recalling an old ordinance from that colony, he ordered Quaife to post several hundred pounds' surety and pay a fine. Should he do neither, he would face penal transportation for publishing "tending to bring the Government into hatred or contempt". Consequently, the last edition of the Advertiser appeared on 10 December. Undeterred, Quaife returned to publishing in 1842, launching the Bay of Islands Observer. His platform was much the same as before. Foolishly, however, he printed some gossip about George Cooper, a former colonial treasurer. He apologized publicly, but was still dismissed by the paper's owners. From that time forward he devoted himself to the Kororareka Congregational Church, which he had founded as New Zealand's first Congregational church in 1840. He also taught and ran a bookshop.

May 1844 found Quaife financially exhausted and intending to return to England. He left for Sydney, intending to spend a short time there, and began preaching in Parramatta, where he stayed to form a Congregational church and build a chapel. He knew the Rev. Dr. Robert Ross of the Pitt Street Congregational Church, but their relationship was never a very easy one, and all connections between them were severed when Quaife was offered a temporary appointment to replace John Dunmore Lang at the Scots Church while the latter was away. He then continued as pastor at the Parramatta church until its closure in 1850; meanwhile, he kept up his service at the Scots Church until February 1847, when it received a Presbyterian minister. Some of the congregation wished to retain Quaife's services, and chose to leave their church and found a new one under him. This organization first met in the Wesleyan Chapel on Macquarie Street before moving to the old City Theatre in Market Street. At the Scots Church he lectured on the evils of Catholicism.

Quaife ministered to this group until 1850, in which year Dr. Lang reopened the Australian College and appointed him to the faculty as a professor of mental philosophy and divinity. He became a foundation member of two synods, that of New South Wales in 1850 and of the reunited ones in 1865. The college's work was restricted in 1852, at which point his teaching position lapsed. He lived again in Parramatta between 1853 and 1855. In the latter year Quaife went to Paddington teaching school while ministering to a congregation at home. 1863 saw reconciliation with Congregational leaders, from whom he had become estranged, and he was invited to train three of their students for the ministry. He closed his school and brought his congregation into the Ocean Street Congregational Church in Woollahra. He tutored his three students until September 1864; in October they were transferred to the then-new Camden College. Quaife did not receive a teaching position at the school, which omission hurt him deeply. Ill health at this point forced him to withdraw from professional work until his death.

Quaife died in Woollahra in 1873.

== Personal life ==
On 4 November 1834, Quaife married Maria Smith in Westminster; they had four sons, two of whom survived infancy. Maria Quaife died in January 1857, and on 29 May of that year Quaife married Eliza Buttrey, with whom he had two children, a son and a daughter. Two of his sons, Frederick Harrison Quaife and William Francis Quaife, went on to become noted physicians in the Sydney area. A granddaughter, Viola Austral Quaife, married Sydney Ure Smith in 1909.

== Selected publications ==
- A condensed view of the proper design and uses of the Lord's Supper (1845)
- The Rules of the Final Judgment (1846)
- Lectures on Prophecy and the Kingdom of Christ (1848)
- The Intellectual Sciences, vols 1-2 (1872)

This last was composed of lectures from the Australian College, and has been claimed as the first serious work of philosophy to be published in Australia. Quaife also contributed articles to many publications, including the Atlas, the People's Advocate, the Press, the Empire, and the Illawarra Mercury; he edited the Christian Standard in 1849 and both forms of the Christian Pleader between 1858 and 1864.
