= Wendy's Milk Bar =

Australian ice cream parlour franchise

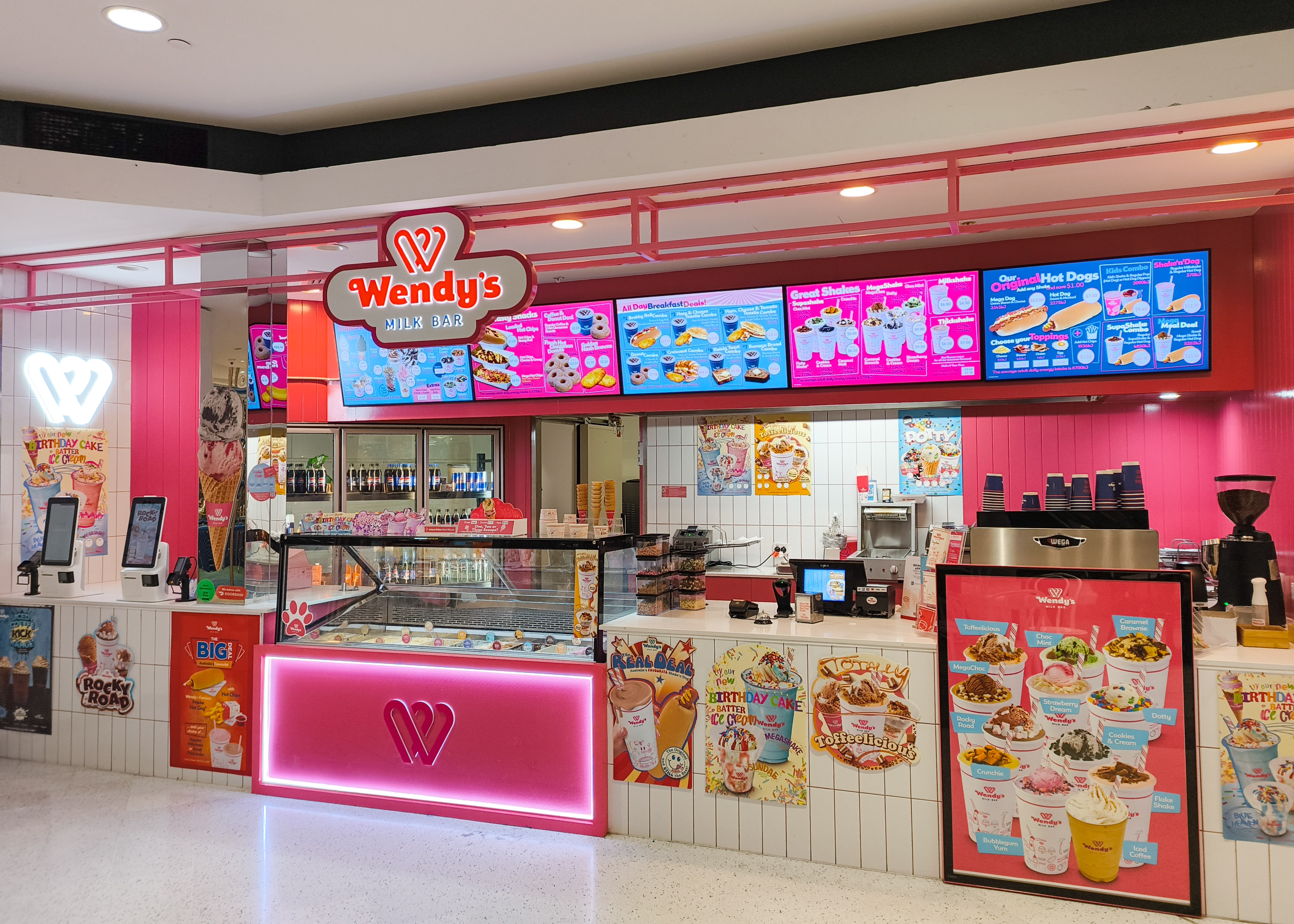
- Wendy's Milk Bar at Westfield Whitford City
- Type: Subsidiary
- Industry: Food and beverage, Ice cream parlor
- Founded: 31 July 1979; 47 years ago in Adelaide, South Australia
- Headquarters: Sydney, New South Wales
- Products: Ice cream, drinks, hot dogs, desserts, and snacks
- Parent: Supatreats Australia
- Website: www.wendysmilkbar.com

Wendy's Milk Bar, formerly known as Wendy's Supa Sundaes, is an Australian ice cream parlour franchise chain consisting of over 200 stores and kiosks. Founded in Adelaide, it is owned by parent company Supatreats Australia, headquartered in the Sydney suburb of Baulkham Hills.

The chain is unrelated to the American fast food chain Wendy's, which briefly operated in Australia between 1982 and 1985 before returning in 2025.

== History ==
The Wendy's franchise network of ice cream retail stores was founded in Adelaide, South Australia on 31 July 1979 by Geoff Davis and Phil Rogers. Wendy's has grown from a single store to a large franchise network of over 200 ice-cream stores spread across Australia and New Zealand. In 2014, the Singaporean company Global Food Retail Group acquired the master franchise rights for the chain.

In late 2018, multiple Wendy's Supa Sundaes in New Zealand cancelled their franchise agreements and renamed themselves to Shake Shed & Co. This was over a disagreement about ice cream suppliers, with the Australian Wendy's corporate office preferring an Australian supplier, and the New Zealand–based locations preferring New Zealand–based suppliers. In 2018, the High Court of New Zealand ruled that the Shake Shed & Co. stores must shut down. The company went into receivership in 2020.

Meanwhile, Wendy's Supa Sundaes rebranded to "Wendy's Milk Bar", repositioning the brand as a milk bar chain.

== See also ==
- List of South Australian manufacturing businesses
- South Australian food and drink
