= York Street, Sydney =

Street in Sydney, Australia

York Street, Sydney New South Wales
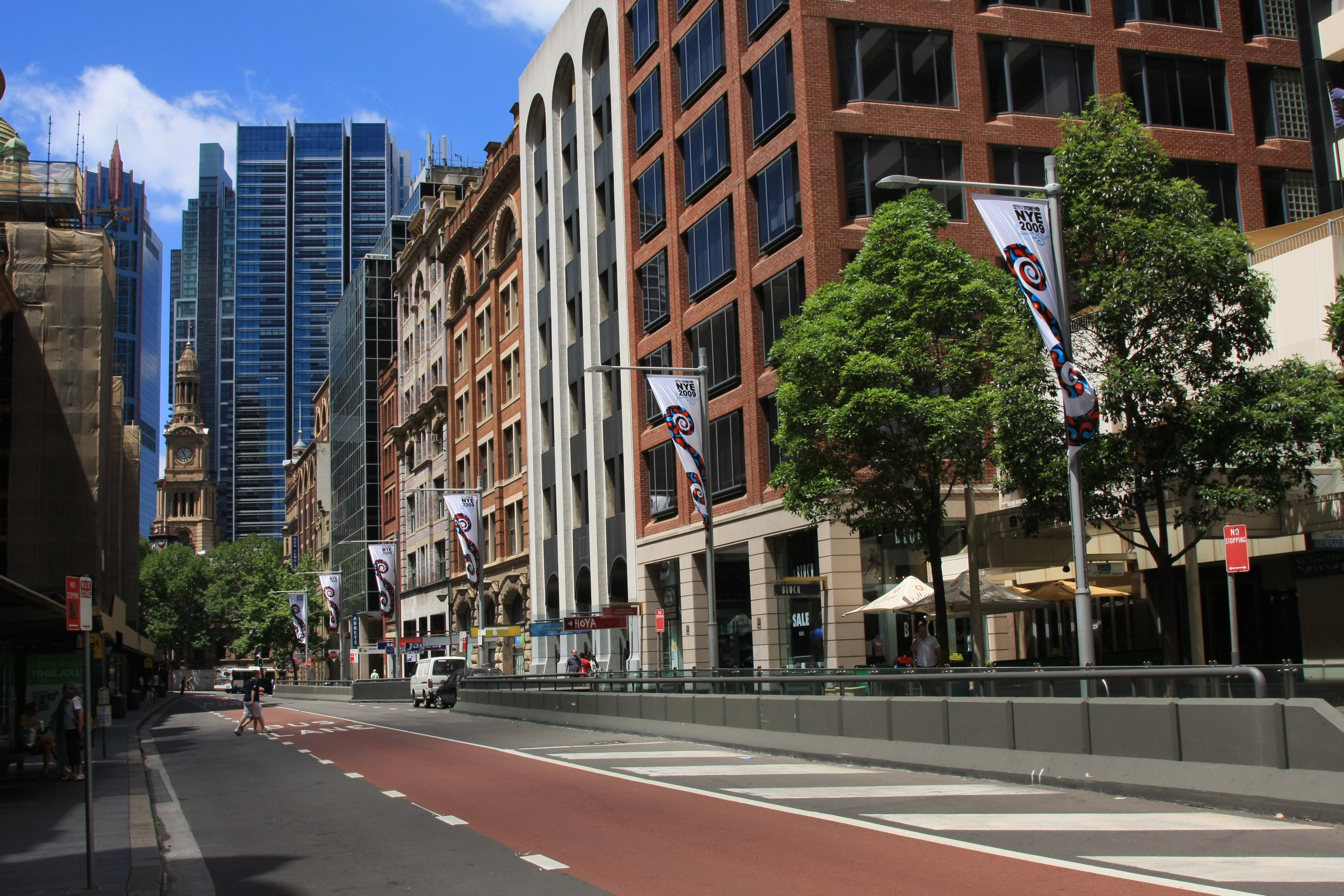
- Looking south down York Street, near Druitt Street
- Coordinates: 33.863373°S 151.205364°E (North end); 33.872783°S 151.206516°E (South end)

General information
- Type: Street
- Length: 1.05 km (0.7 mi)
- Former route number: National Route 1 (1955–1986)

Major junctions
- North end: Grosvenor Street; Bradfield Highway; The Rocks, Sydney
- Erskine Street; King Street; Market Street
- South end: Druitt Street; Sydney CBD

Location(s)
- Suburb(s): Sydney CBD

York Street is a street in the Sydney central business district in New South Wales, Australia. York Street runs 1.050 kilometres (0.652 mi) in a north to south direction only.

== Route ==
From its northern terminus at the junction of Grosvenor Street with the Bradfield Highway, York Street runs south past Wynyard railway station, with major intersections at King and Market streets. The southern terminus of York Street is at Druitt Street, adjacent to the Sydney Town Hall and the Queen Victoria Building. Between Market Street and Druitt Street, traffic is restricted to buses, bicycles and service vehicles only.

The City Circle and North Shore railway lines run under York Street.

== History ==
Named in 1810 by Governor Lachlan Macquarie after the Prince Frederick, Duke of York and Albany, the second eldest child, and second son, of King George III, and brother of King William IV. It was originally known as Barracks Row as it began at the old Barracks parade ground. The southern end became home to many import and export companies, being attracted to the area by the markets established there in Macquarie's time. The northern end beyond Wynyard Square did not come into existence until 1848 when the land occupied by the Wynyard Barracks was resumed and subdivided. Half of this new section, along with Princes Street into which it ran, disappeared with the resumption of land for the Sydney Harbour Bridge approaches in The Rocks area. On 21 July 1997, a bus lane was introduced along the full length of York Street.

== Points of interest ==
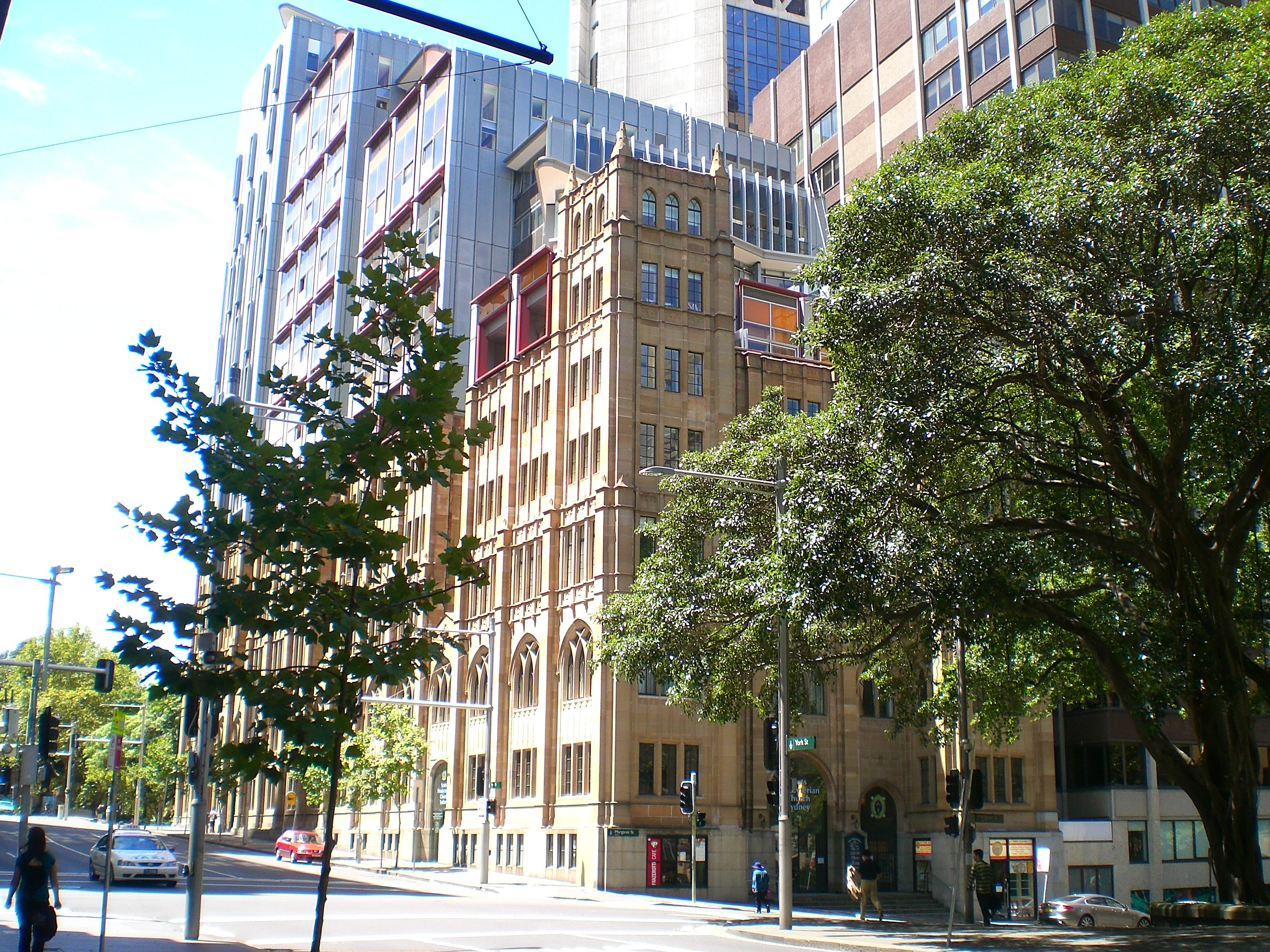
Scots Presbyterian Church, on the corner of York and Margaret Streets

- Scots Presbyterian Church at 2 York, on the corner with Margaret Street, was founded in 1882. The current building dates from 1929.
- Transport House, a heritage-listed building located at 19–31 York, constructed in the early 1930s as the administrative home of the New South Wales State Railways.
- The AWA Building and Tower, a heritage-listed building located at 45 York, was the Sydney's tallest between 1939 and 1967. Completed just before World War II and built to the 46 metres height limit of the day, it is a brick-faced building with projecting vertical ribs and parapet decoration in the form of a Pegasus in bass relief, the Pegasus being the company's logo.
- 73 York Street, built c. 1892 as a five-storey warehouse (plus basement). Believed to have been designed by Herbert S.Thompson, the facade is a fine example of the Victorian Mannerist style.
- The Grace Hotel at 77–79 York, a heritage-listed art-deco building opened in 1930 and modelled on Chicago's Tribune Tower that is now a hotel. Designed by Morrow & Gordon and built by Kell & Rigby during the late 1920s, the Grace Building was opened in 1930 by Grace Bros, the Australian department store magnates, as their headquarters.
- Hong Kong House, a heritage-listed building located at 149 York, formerly the Gresham Hotel and Central Hotel, is situated on a prominent site on the corner of York and Druitt Streets forming part of the Town Hall streetscape. It is a five-storey building of Victorian Free Classical Style.
