= Eastgate =

Eastgate may refer to:

== Places ==
=== Canada ===
- Eastgate, Alberta, Canada
- Eastgate, British Columbia, Canada

=== United Kingdom ===
- Eastgate, Bourne, Lincolnshire
- Eastgate, Chester, a gate through the Roman walls, with a clock above
- Eastgate, County Durham, England
- Eastgate, Norfolk, England
- Eastgate, Peterborough, Cambridgeshire, England
- Eastgate, a fictional town in the UK TV series Dad's Army
- Eastgate Church, a community centre within Springhead Park, Ebbsfleet

=== United States ===
- Eastgate, Orange County, Florida, a place in Florida
- Eastgate, Manatee County, Florida, a place in Florida
- Eastgate, Sarasota County, Florida, a place in Florida
- Eastgate, Indiana, an unincorporated town in Vernon Township, Hancock County, Indiana
- Eastgate, Indianapolis, Indiana
- Eastgate, Nevada
- Eastgate, Ohio, a neighbourhood of Columbus
- Eastgate, Roanoke, Virginia, a neighborhood
- Eastgate, Texas
- Eastgate, Bellevue, Washington

== Other uses ==
- Eastgate Airport, part of AFB Hoedspruit, South Africa
- Eastgate and Eastgate Clock, a city gate and clock in Chester, England
- Eastgate Bondi Junction, a shopping centre in Sydney, Australia
- Eastgate Centre, Harare, Zimbabwe
- Eastgate Shopping Centre, Johannesburg, South Africa
- Eastgate Hotel, Oxford, England
- Eastgate Mall (disambiguation), including Eastgate Shopping Centre
- Eastgate Square, a shopping center in Hamilton, Ontario, Canada
- Eastgate Systems, a software company and hypertext fiction publisher located in Watertown, Massachusetts, United States
- Eastgate, a former name of Piccadilly Tower, Manchester, England
- Gloucester Eastgate railway station, a defunct station in Gloucester, England
- Peter Eastgate (born 1985), Danish poker player

== See also ==
- East Gate (disambiguation)
