= East Gate =

East Gate may refer to:

- Chinatown East Gate, in Los Angeles, California
- East Gate (Luohu), English for Dongmen, Shenzhen, China
- East Gate, British Columbia, Canada
- East Gate Bel Air, Los Angeles, California, a neighborhood
- East Gate Range, a mountain range in Nevada
- East Gate Square, a regional shopping mall in New Jersey
- East Gate/West Gate, a sculpture by Sasson Soffer in Indianapolis, Indiana
- Taipei East Gate

== See also ==
- Eastgate (disambiguation)
