= Eastgate Mall =

Eastgate Mall, or Eastgate Shopping Centre, or similar, may refer to:

- Eastgate Centre, Harare, Zimbabwe
- Eastgate Consumer Mall, formerly Eastgate Shopping Center, Indianapolis, Indiana, U.S.
- Eastgate Mall (Chattanooga), Tennessee, U.S.
- Eastgate Mall (Cincinnati), Ohio, U.S.
- Eastgate Mall over I-805 Bridge, San Diego County, California, U.S.
- Eastgate Shopping Centre (Basildon), Essex, England
- Eastgate Shopping Centre (Bondi Junction), New South Wales, Australia
- Eastgate Shopping Centre, Gloucester, England
- Eastgate Shopping Centre (Inverness), Scotland
- Eastgate Shopping Centre, Johannesburg, South Africa
- Eastgate Square, Hamilton, Ontario, Canada
- Sherwood Park Mall, formerly Eastgate Mall, Sherwood Park, Alberta, Canada

== See also ==
- Eastgate (disambiguation)
