= Westfield Miranda =

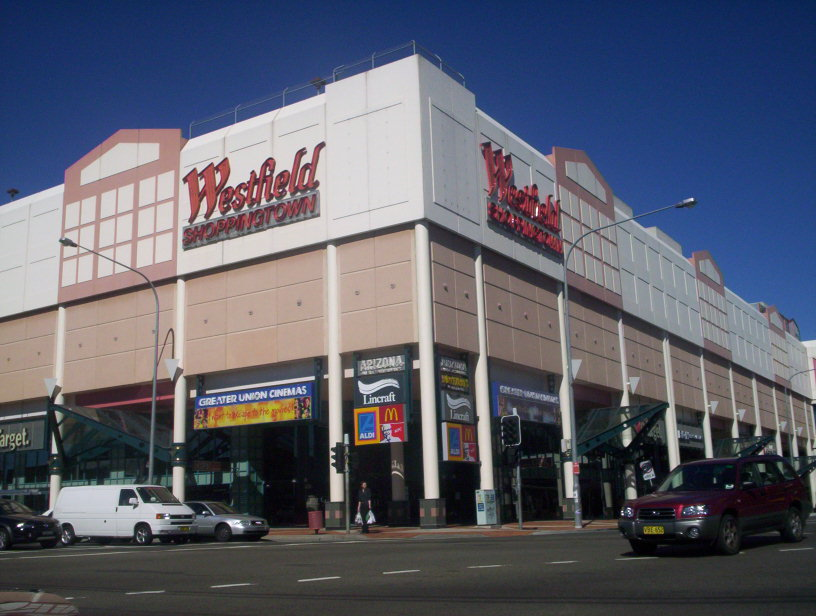
- Westfield Shopping centre, eastern end
- Location: Miranda, New South Wales
- Coordinates: 34°02′08″S 151°06′02″E
- Address: 600 Kingsway
- Opened: 16 March 1964
- Previous names: Miranda Fair (1964 - 1971)
- Manager: Scentre Group
- Owner: Scentre Group (50%); Dexus (50%)
- Architect: Tomkins, Shaw & Evans Architects
- Num. of stores: 438
- Num. of anchor tenants: 9
- Floor area: 128,410 m^{2} (1,382,194 sq ft)
- Floors: 6
- Parking: 4,891 spaces
- Public transit: Miranda; Kingsway and Kiora Road
- Website: www.westfield.com.au/miranda

Westfield Miranda (also known as Miranda Fair) is a large shopping centre in the suburb of Miranda in Sutherland Shire of Sydney.

== Transport ==
The Cronulla railway line offers frequent services to Miranda station located outside the centre.

Westfield Miranda has bus connections to St George and South Western Sydney, as well as routes to local surrounding suburbs within the Sutherland Shire. Most routes are operated by U-Go Mobility with two routes by Transit Systems. Maianbar Bundeena Bus Service operates one Friday trip to/from Bundeena. All routes operate from Kiora Road with many also from the Kingsway.

In 1973, the Public Transport Commission introduced bus services to and from Rockdale station.

Westfield Miranda has multi-level car parks with 4,891 spaces.

== History ==
=== 20th Century ===
==== 1960s: opening ====
Miranda Fair was officially opened on 16 March 1964 by the Premier of New South Wales, Bob Heffron, in front of 1,600 guests. A highlight of the opening ceremony was the arrival of a helicopter to deliver newspapers. A special fireworks display was put on for the locals on that evening.

The 3.25 million pound centre was designed by Tomkins, Shaw & Evans Architects and was built on the former site of Fowler's brick pit. Miranda Fair was developed by Myer and Farmers and was the largest fully enclosed shopping centre in NSW. The centre held that title until Roselands opened a year later.

Miranda Fair featured a Farmer & Company department store on three levels, Woolworths supermarket and 18 speciality stores. It also had a child minding centre, playground and parking for 1100 cars. Miranda Library moved into the shopping centre in 1964.

In 1969, Westfield Corporation purchased Miranda Fair from Myer for $10 million. Following this purchase Westfield lodged plans with Sutherland Council to expand the centre. The expanded centre was proposed to double the centre in size and would extend to Kingsway. Farmers would expand their existing store, a new supermarket, hardware store and discount department store were also part of the proposal.

The expansion plans were approved in November 1969 by the council. As part of this approval, Wandella Road would be upgraded from the Kingsway to President Avenue. This also included the construction of a road bridge over the Cronulla railway line. The final approval was given in early 1970.

==== 1970s: redevelopment ====
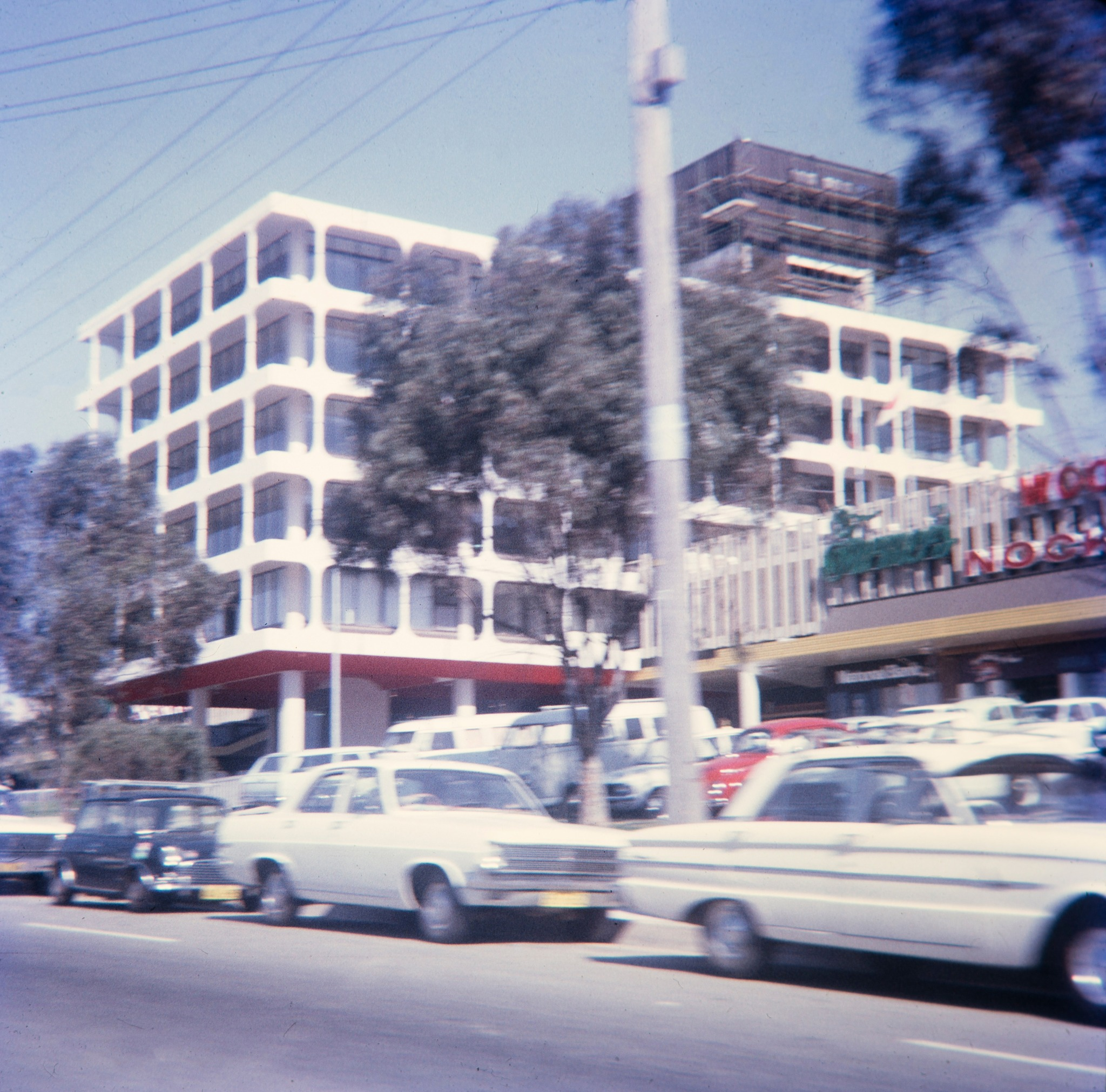
Former office tower in September 1971

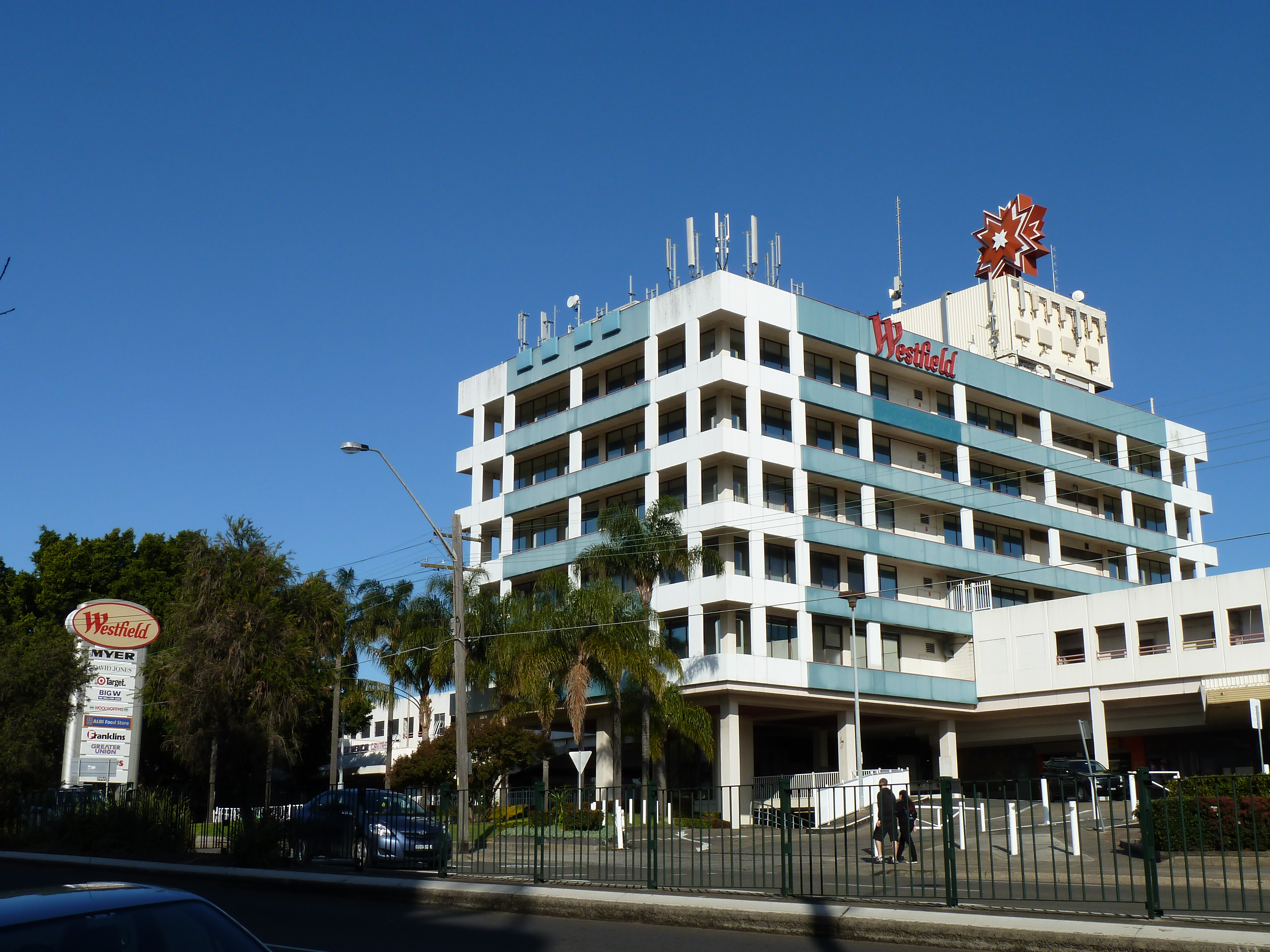
A photo of the former office tower, 25 July 2010 (demolished mid-2013)

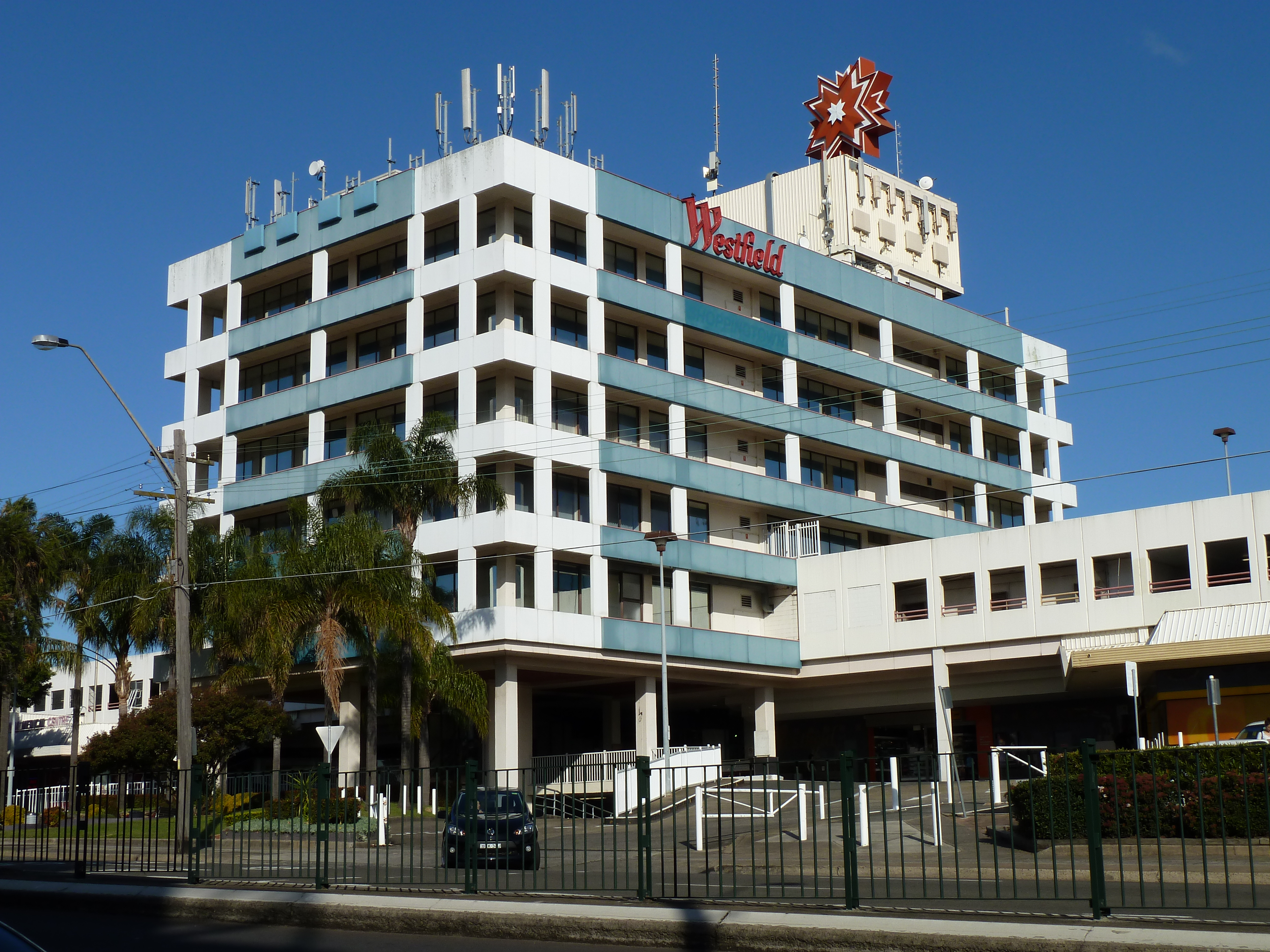
Another photo of the former office tower, 25 July 2010 (demolished mid-2013)

In September 1971, the expansion was completed and Miranda Fair was renamed to Westfield Shoppingtown Miranda. This expansion made Westfield Miranda the first regional shopping centre in Sydney to have two department stores – Farmers and Grace Bros. Grace Bros traded on four levels. Woolworths expanded to become a Woolworths Family Centre which was a hypermarket consisting of Big W and Woolworths in the one store. Nock & Kirby was also added to the centre. At this time, a Hill's weeping fig was planted.

Westfield Miranda opened a new office tower in March 1972 as part of the expansion. The five storey office tower was facing the Kingsway and featured a large eight-pointed, slowly revolving star on its rooftop. Part of the heritage of the centre, and somewhat of a local landmark, the star was lit at night and unique to any Westfield shopping centre.

The success of Westfield Miranda and the increasing population of the Sutherland Shire in the 1970s led to Westfield to begin planning another expansion for the centre. In 1976 Farmers was rebranded as Myer. The expansion plans were lodged to the council however it was rejected. The plans were to extend the centre over the railway line and into Karimbla Road.

==== 1980s ====
In 1983, Myer purchased Grace Bros and made the decision to withdraw from New South Wales due to poor sales and the focus on growing the Grace Bros brand across the state. As Grace Bros was already a tenant in the centre, Myer decided to vacate its space. This allowed Westfield to subdivide the space and expand the centre. In mid 1983 Harvey Norman opened its store in the top floor of the Myer space.

This redevelopment caused controversy as Westfield gained approval to build the three-level car park next to Miranda Public School, with a road bridge over Wandella Road. This led to protests by parents and teachers of Miranda Public School to stop the car park extension, however it was unsuccessful. This expansion also created a land swap which resulted in the construction of a new council library and other community facilities on Wandella Road.

The first stage of expansion was completed on 17 April 1984 and included the relocation of Woolworths from level 2 into level 3 in the old Myer space. Stage 2 opened on 28 August 1984 and included BBC Hardware, Best & Less and Franklins and an international food court. Stage 3 opened on 25 March 1985 and featured a new Big W store on the old space of Woolworths space on level 2. The total number of shops in the centre had doubled to 160.

Miranda Library moved to its new premises on Wandella Road outside Westfield Miranda in 1985.

==== 1990s ====
In 1990 Westfield planned another expansion of the centre after two decades purchasing sites in the block bounded by the Kingsway, Kiora Road, Urunga Parade and Jackson Avenue. On that site shops, offices, Miranda Police Station and the Miranda Congregational Church. For this expansion to proceed, Westfield purchased sites within Miranda to relocate the police station and Miranda Congregational Church. In 1991 Westfield commenced construction of the expansion. This was completed in stages with the full opening on 1 October 1992 and gave the centre 108,316 square metres (1,165,900 square feet) of retail space. The new stores that opened in the expansion included David Jones and Target. A new food court, restaurants and entertainment precinct opened. The food court featured 20 outlets including fast food restaurants such as McDonald's, Hungry Jack's, Subway and KFC. The entertainment precinct featured an eight screen Greater Union cinema complex on the basement level and a Tilt amusement arcade centre on level one next to the food court. The restaurant precinct was located on the ground level with an entrance to the cinema.

In early 1996 Harvey Norman closed its store and relocated to the newly built Caringbah Super Centre in Taren Point. The space vacated by Harvey Norman was taken over by Toys "R" Us which opened on 1 November 1997. In the late 1990s Tilt closed down and was replaced by Aldi and The Reject Shop.

=== 21st Century ===
==== 2000s ====
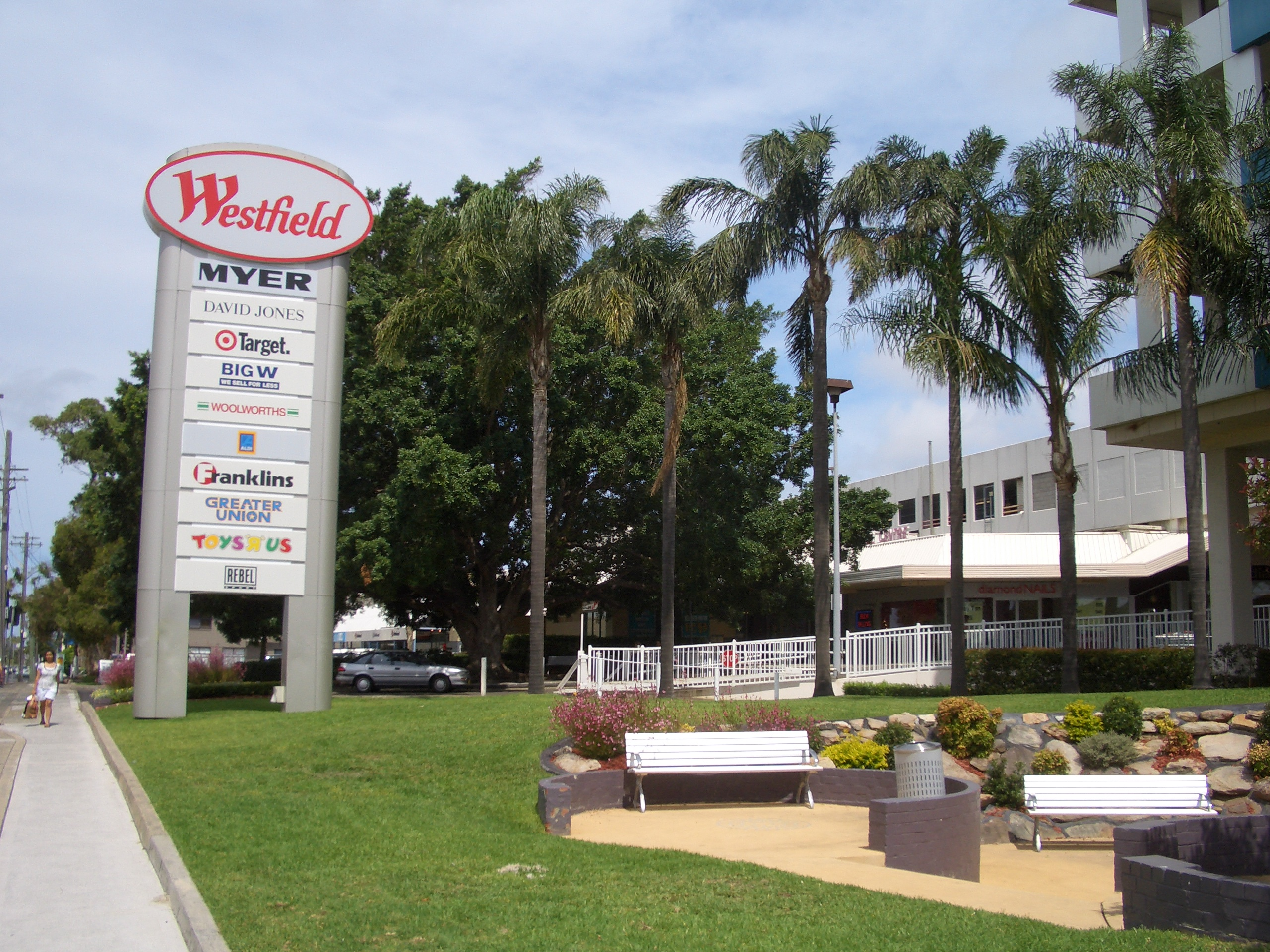
Outside of former main entrance area, looking east. December 2006 (demolished mid-2013)

Since these expansions, other shopping centres have been built and expanded, including Westfield Parramatta and Westfield Bondi Junction which then made Westfield Miranda the fourth largest Westfield shopping centre in Sydney. In December 2005 Westfield Miranda was valued at $481.6 million, up from $444.7 million in December 2004.

==== 2010s: redevelopment ====
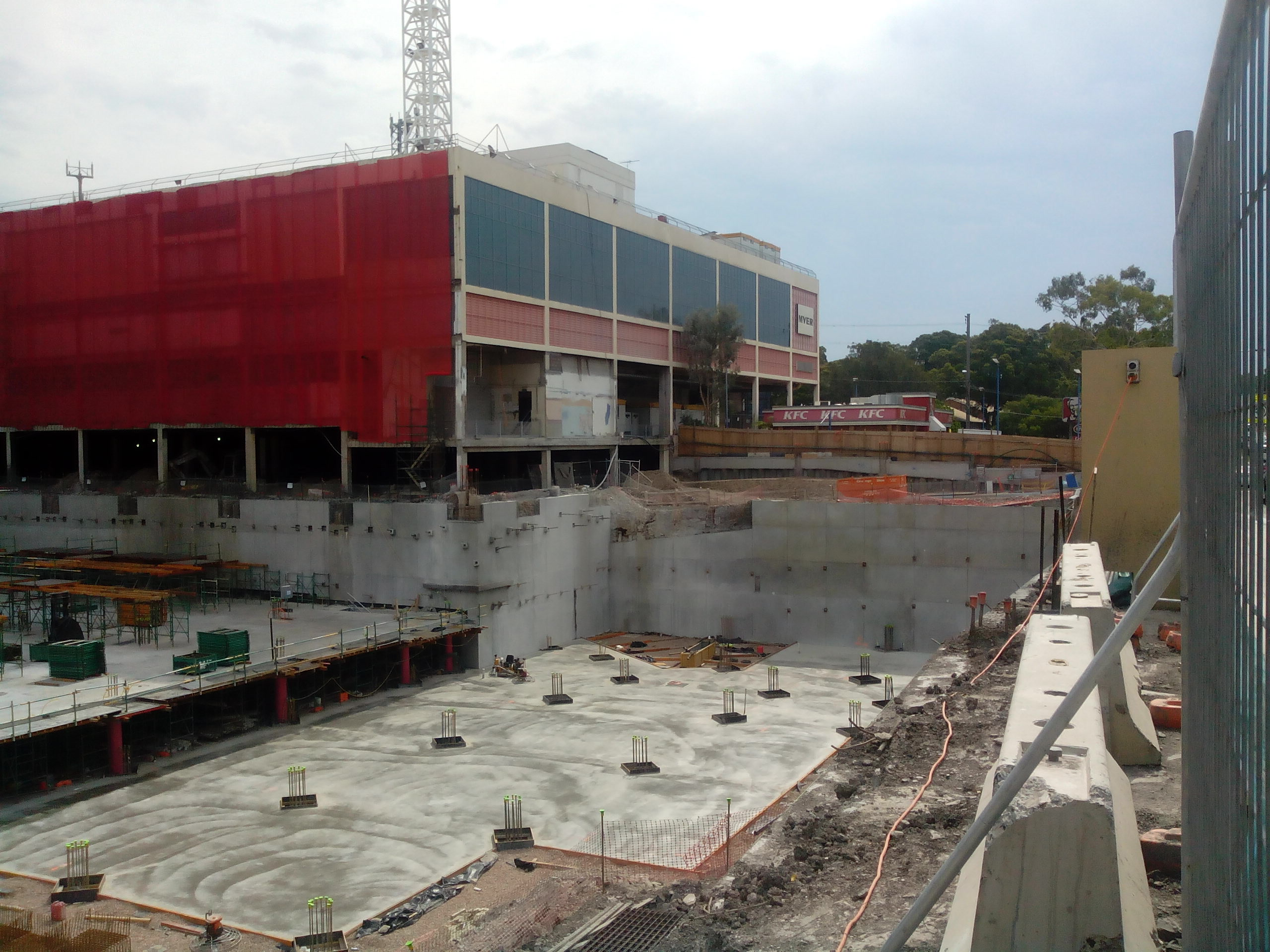
Redevelopment of former main entrance, looking at the west end. December 2013.

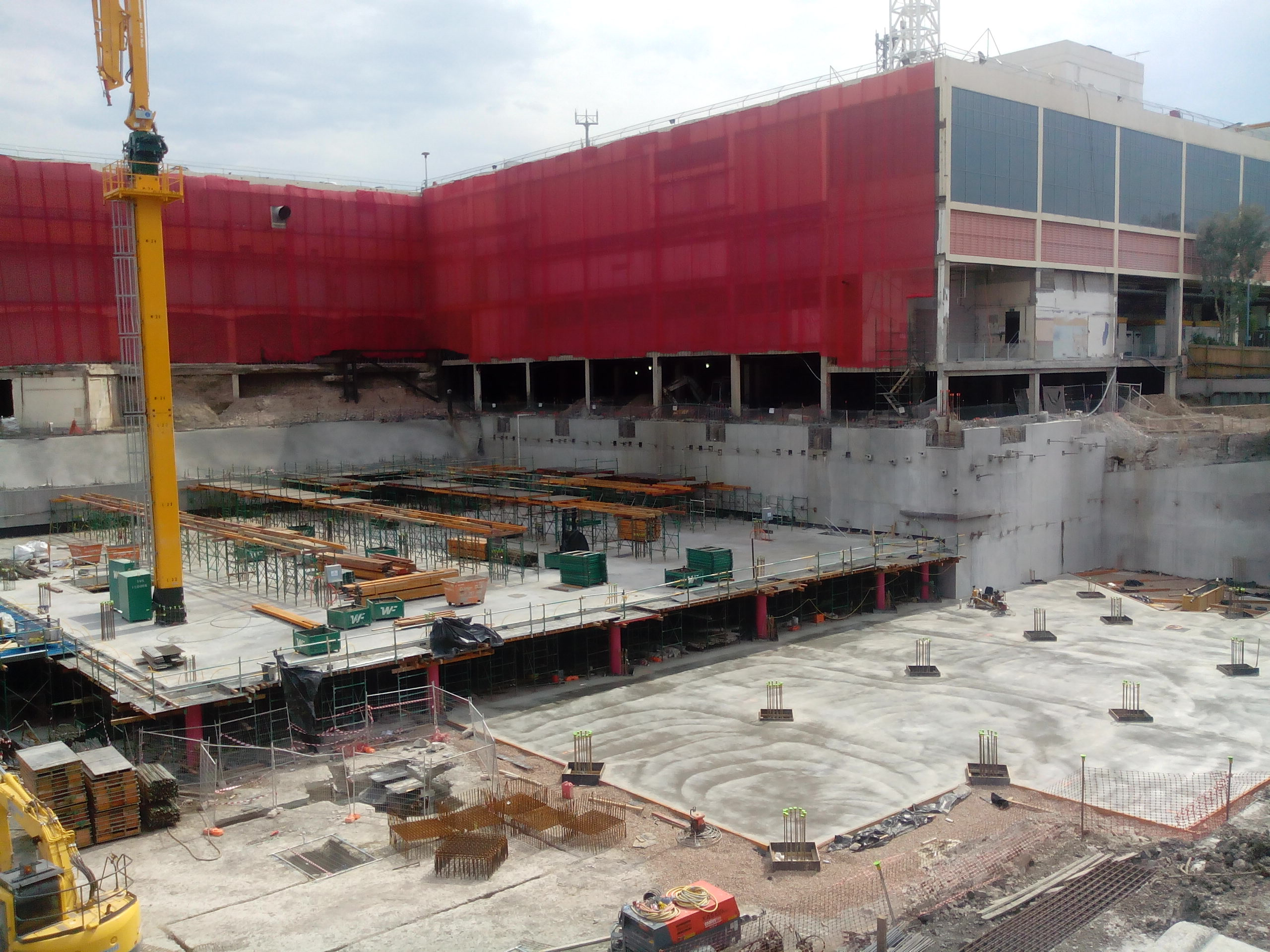
Redevelopment of former main entrance, looking at the middle of the site. December 2013. (#1)

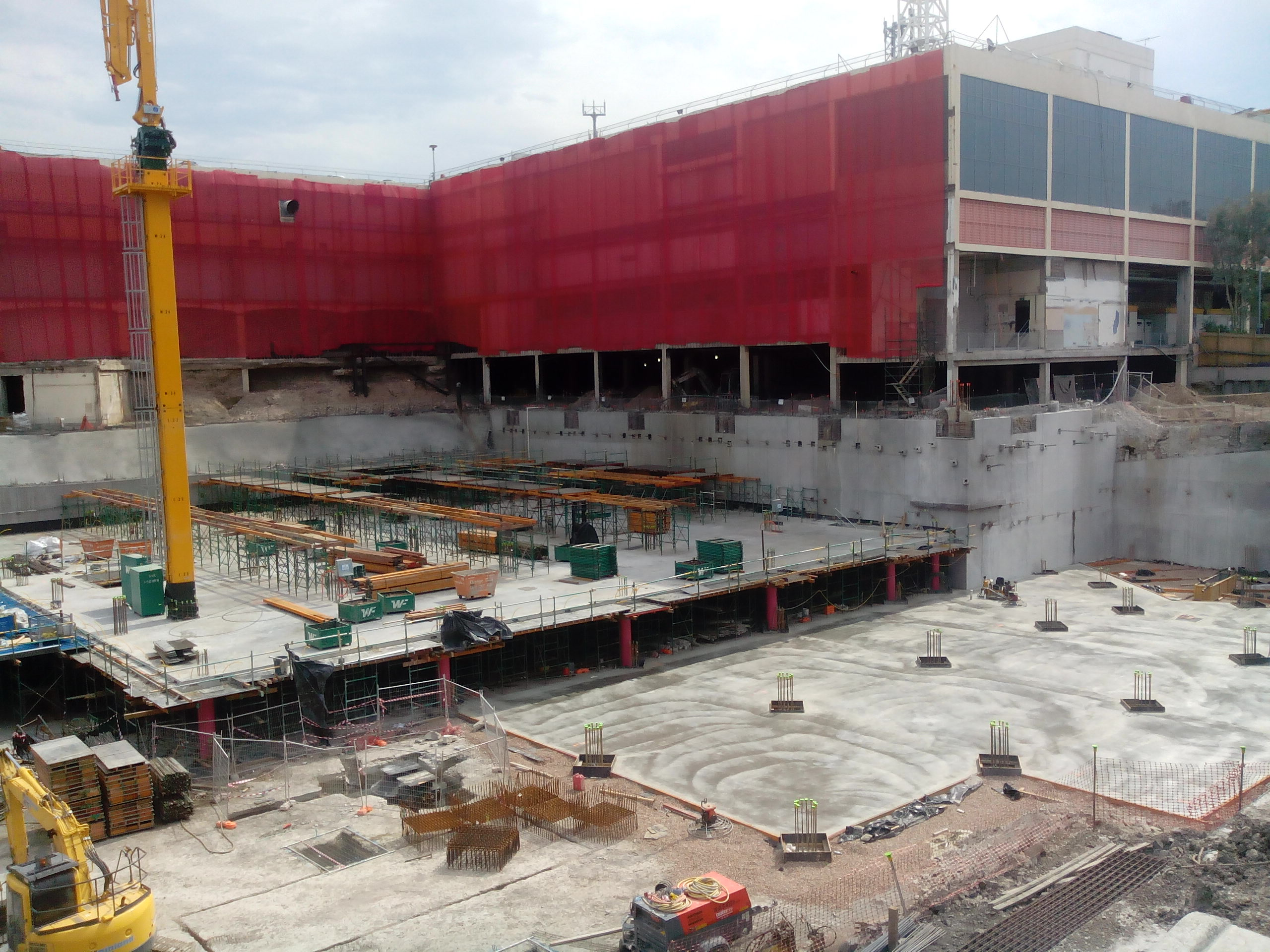
Redevelopment of former main entrance, looking at the middle of the site. December 2013. (#2)

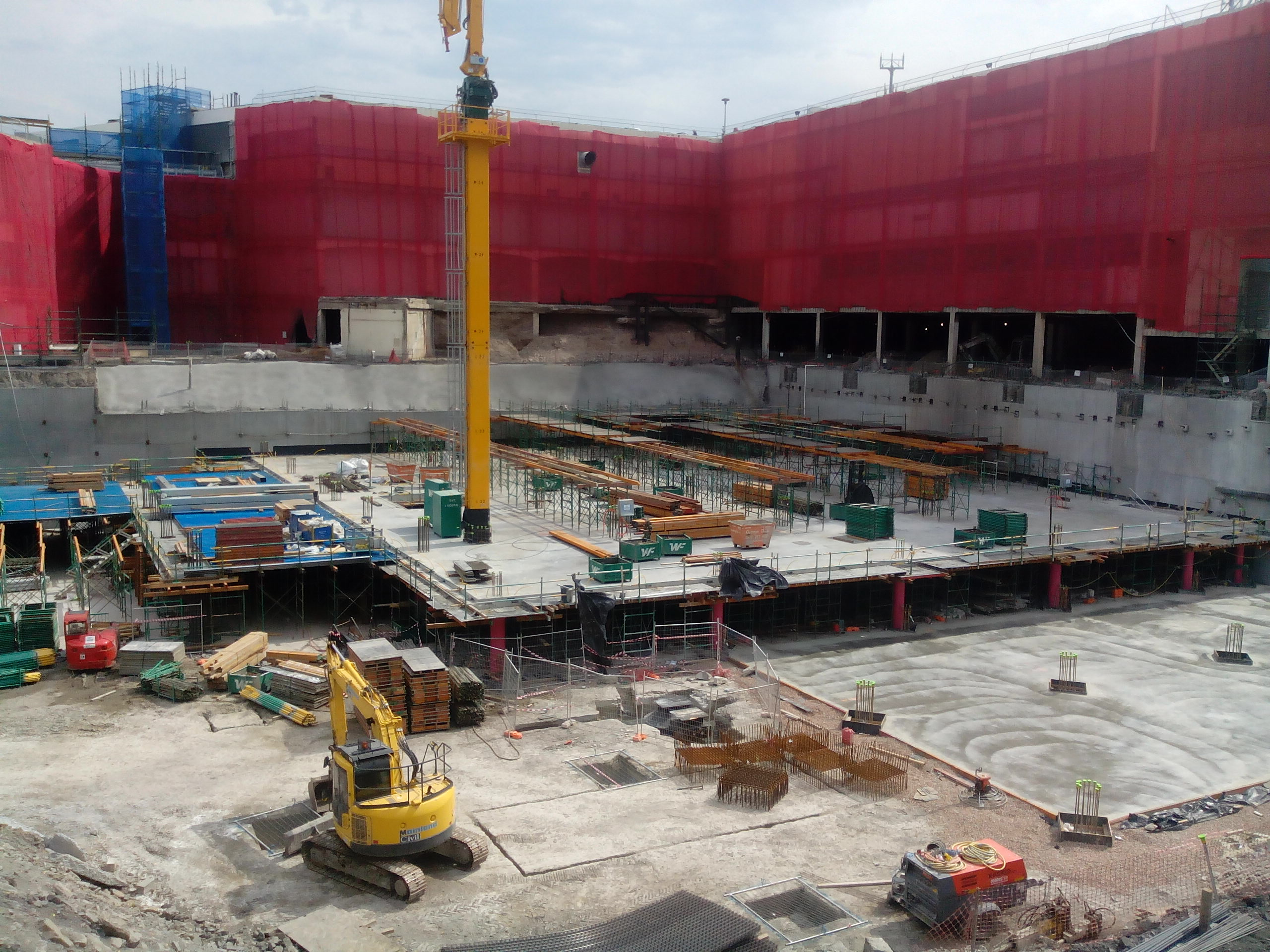
Redevelopment of former main entrance, looking at the middle of the site. December 2013. (#3)

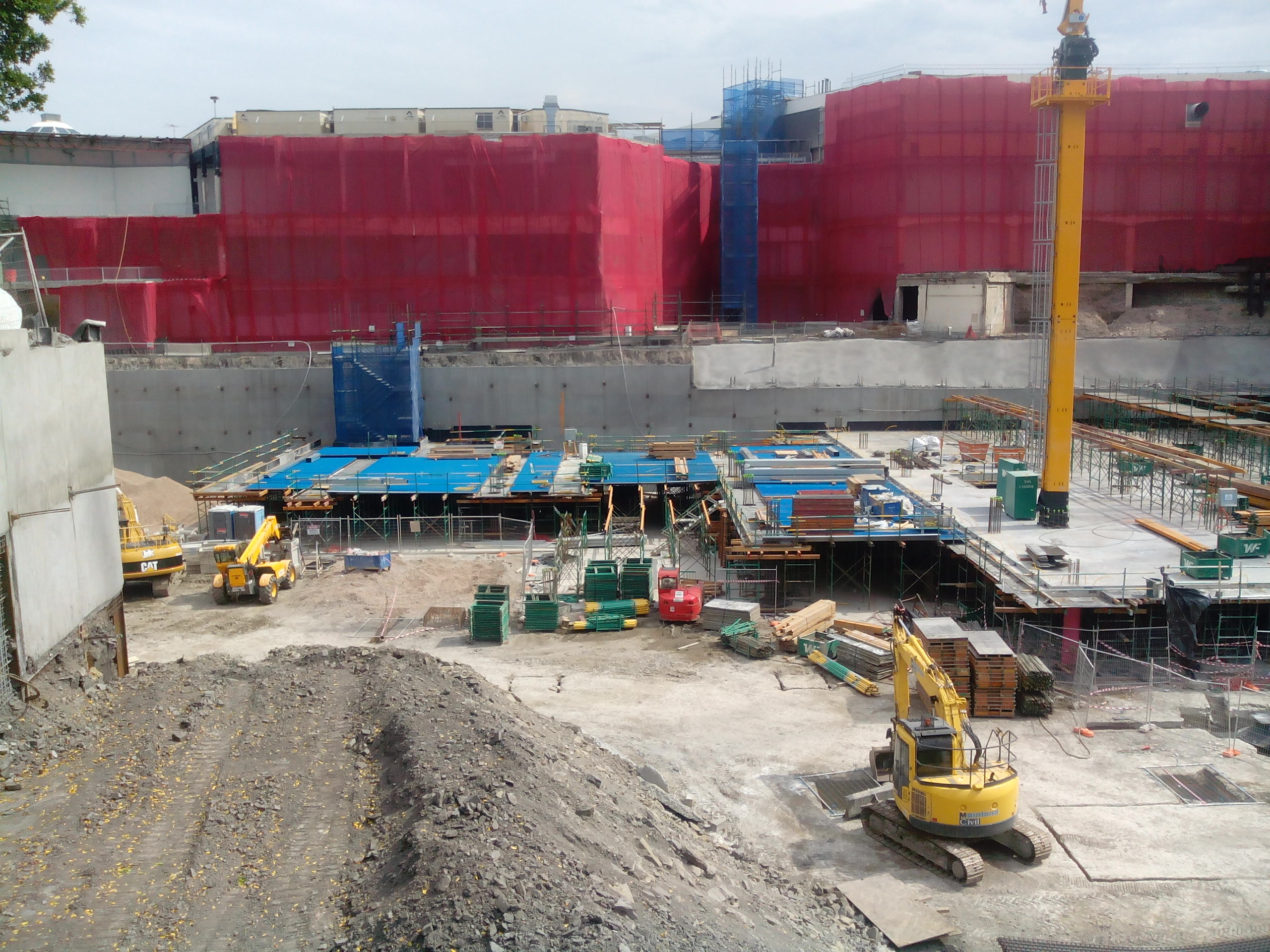
Redevelopment of former main entrance, looking east. December 2013.

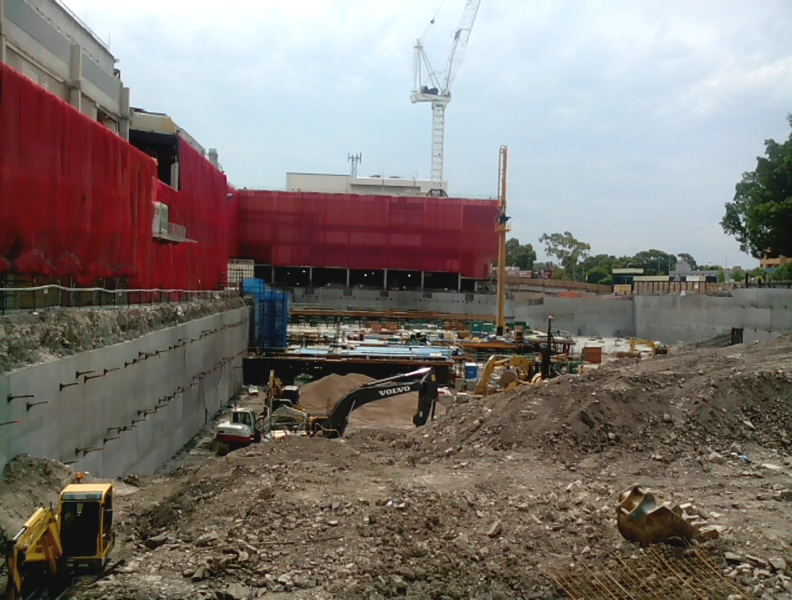
Redevelopment of former main entrance, looking west. December 2013. Tree on right is same tree in photo of entrance pre-demolition

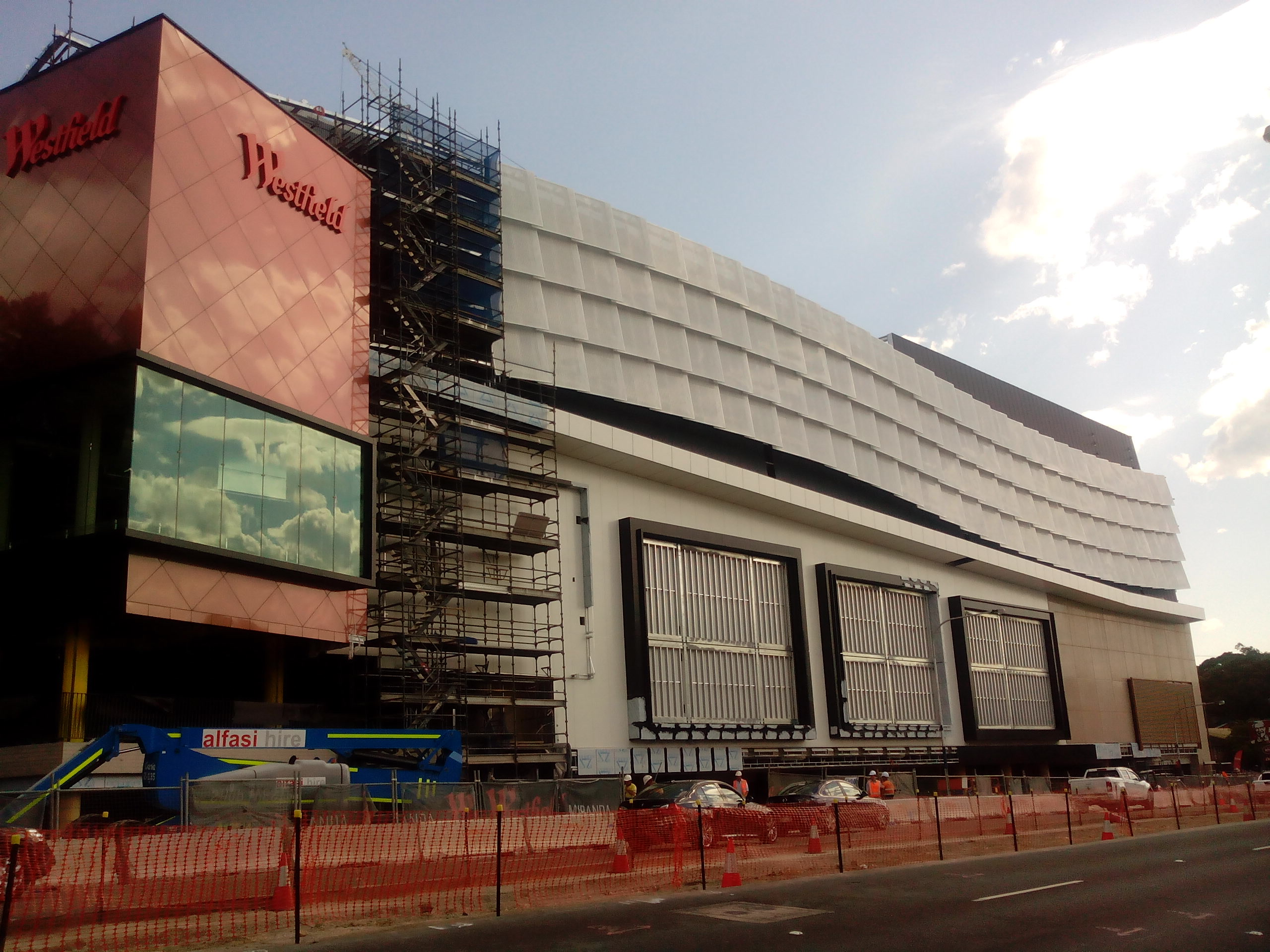
Western end replacing office tower and surrounds, as of 30 September 2014

In early 2009, Sutherland Council approved plans to further upgrade the complex, which included demolition of the office tower and adding 100 additional speciality shops at a cost of $435 million. The redevelopment plans included the addition of 100 more specialty stores, a new three-level galleria mall, a new relocated 10-screen Event Cinemas complex, an outdoor restaurant precinct, a refurbished Myer department store, a refurbished Big W discount department store, a new full-line Woolworths supermarket and fresh food precinct. An extra 19,000m² of retail space was to be added to bring the total to around 127,000m².

Early works and demolition began in June 2013 in the Myer end of the centre known as Camellia Court with the closure of some stores and The Eatery food court on level 2. The Myer store was refurbished and reduced from four floors to three. The ground floor of Myer was closed to make way for a larger 'full-line' Woolworths supermarket.

Demolition of the areas around the office tower began in July 2013. The star which sat on top of the tower was knocked off in late July 2013 as the office tower it sat upon was demolished. This caused anger amongst locals who wanted the star saved and incorporated into the new development. However the fig tree located outside the centre on Kingsway was saved and incorporated into the development, with a team of landscape architects and arborists managing the health and habit of the tree.

The first stage of the $435 million redevelopment opened on Thursday 16 October 2014 with the opening of a new large Woolworths supermarket, BWS and 18 stores in the fresh food precinct on level 1. Alongside the opening of the fresh food precinct, 40 specialty stores across homewares, fashion and beauty services have opened and as a new underground multi-level carpark with valet service and ticketless parking have opened.

A feature of this development is a new facade above the centre on Kingsway which is made up of over 100 3mm thick, aluminium perforated powder coated sheets which created a wave effect which is designed to resemble fish scales in homage to "the Sutherland Shire's beach culture".

Stage two of the now $475 million redevelopment opened on 20 November 2014 with the official grand opening on Thursday, 27 November, with four days of celebrations. Around 90 specialty stores, a three-level galleria mall between a refurbished Myer and David Jones department stores and a three-level restaurant precinct around the existing weeping fig tree with a water feature and lush landscapes on Kingsway opened.

In April 2015, Franklins closed down and was replaced by Coles. This store was the final Franklins store in Australia, ultimately ending the business.

The final stage of the redevelopment which includes a new 10-screen Event Cinemas complex and four restaurants on the rooftop level opened on 2 April 2015. The new Event Cinemas complex replaced the existing Greater Union Cinemas complex in the basement level.

On 16 April 2015 Topshop Topman opened its second New South Wales store on the former space of Woolworths on level 3.

On 28 May 2015 Zara opened its fifth Sydney two-level store in the outside Myer on level 2 and 3. Uniqlo opened next door to Zara on level 3 on 6 June 2015. On 27 July 2015 Apple opened its 22nd Australian store on level 2.

During the renovations when the new parking system came in, people who lived near Miranda Fair noted that shoppers and employees of Miranda Fair were increasingly parking in the streets to avoid paying the fees for parking in Miranda Fair. In February 2015, Westfield Miranda planned to reintroduce free parking for people with disability stickers in response to feedback that parking was difficult to find. In December 2015, Westfield Miranda extended its opening hours until midnight. In December 2016, to cope with Christmas demand, parking at Port Hacking High School was arranged for shoppers at Westfield Miranda.

On 8 April 2016 Sky Zone opened its second Sydney location on the former cinema space. The PLAYTIME arcade opened around that time on the former restaurant space which was rebranded to Timezone in November 2018.

On 25 June 2018 Toys "R" Us went into voluntary administration. Toys "R" Us closed due to bankruptcy on 5 July 2018. After the closure of the store Rebel expanded and took over the space of Toys "R" Us.

On 10 November 2019 Sky Zone closed. It did not give a reason. In a statement released the decision was "due to external circumstances out of our team's control".

==== 2020s ====
On 20 March 2021 Target closed down and was replaced by Kmart which opened on 12 April 2021.

Since the closure of Sky Zone in November 2019, Scentre Group worked with Funlab to explore options for a new entertainment concept in Westfield Miranda. In February 2022 plans for a new entertainment centre next to the rooftop cinemas and restaurants were proposed on the old partial space of Toys "R" Us. It was to include a ten-pin bowling, laser tag, arcade games, a bar, and food options. On 29th May 2023, the DA was approved and the new entertainment centre was revealed as Archie Brothers Cirque Electriq.

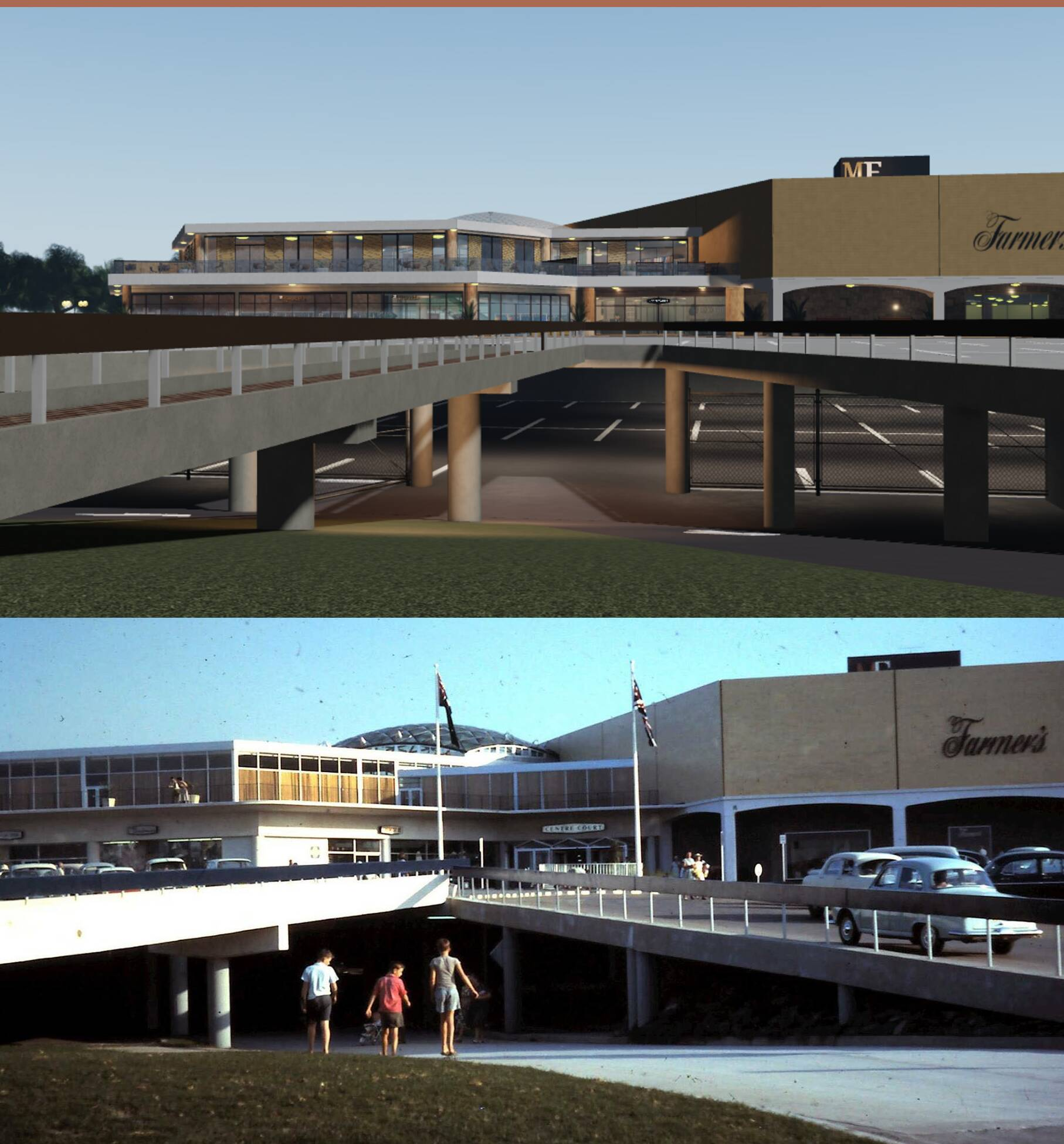
Ethem's 1964 virtual recreation in comparison to the original centre

On 20 March 2024 a local Shire teenager fully recreated the original 1964 centre digitally on the platform known as Roblox. Ethem had set out on recreating the original shopping centre as he had a deep fascination of the unique architecture the original centre had and wants to preserve this lost piece of architecture for future generations to look back on with a more vivid image. A showcase video of the digital 1964 centre on YouTube was released to go along with The Leader article.

On 29 April 2025 it was announced that Harris Farm Markets would replace the Fruitezy fruit shop on level 1 after 11 years of trade alongside the chicken shop and fish shop. Harris Farm Markets opened on 25 September 2025.

== Tenants ==
Westfield Miranda has 128,410m² of floor space. The major retailers include David Jones, Myer, Big W, Kmart, Aldi, Coles, Harris Farm Markets, Woolworths, Cotton On, Uniqlo, Zara, Apple, JB Hi-Fi, Rebel, Timezone and Event Cinemas.

== Incidents ==
- On 23 March 2017, a woman fell from the roof of the centre and died around 8:20am. Police were investigating the causes behind the fall as there were no suspicious circumstances and a report was prepared for the Coroner. Part of the centre was closed while roadblocks were set up causing major delays in both directions as emergency services responded.
- On 9 April 2020, a woman went on a racial tirade yelling out abuse to Telstra workers. This incident occurred around 11am and the woman has since been charged.

== Gallery ==
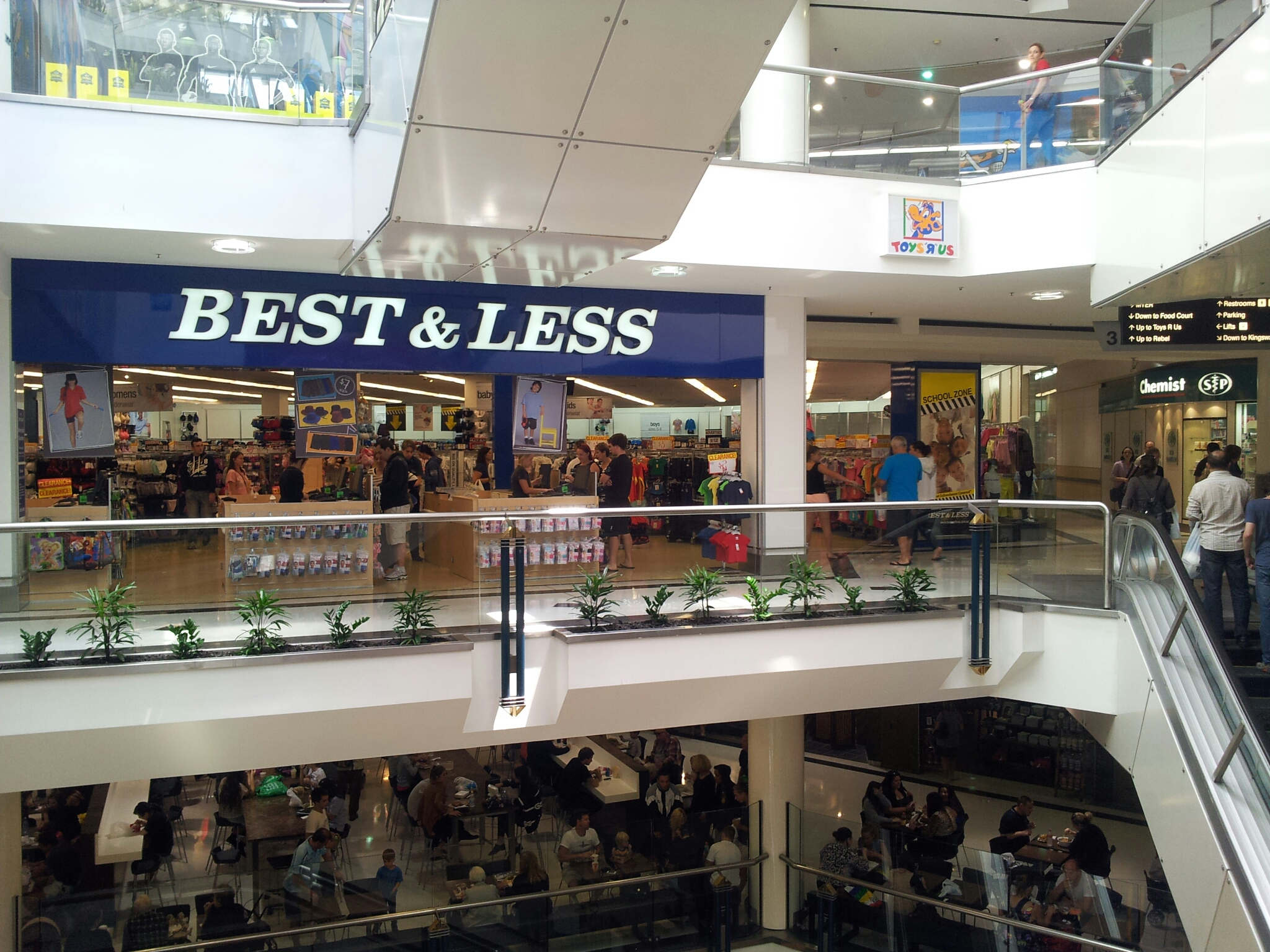
Best and Less at Westfield Miranda (February 2013)

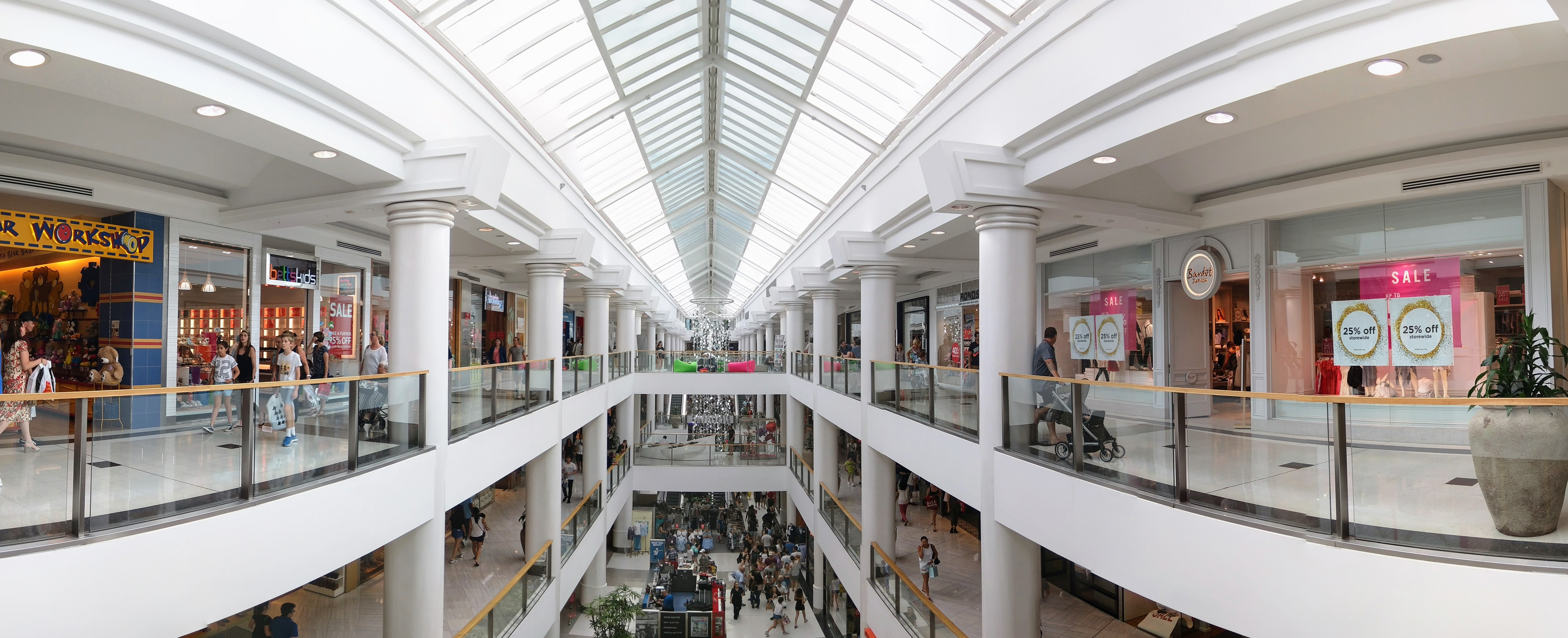
Westfield Miranda in December 2016

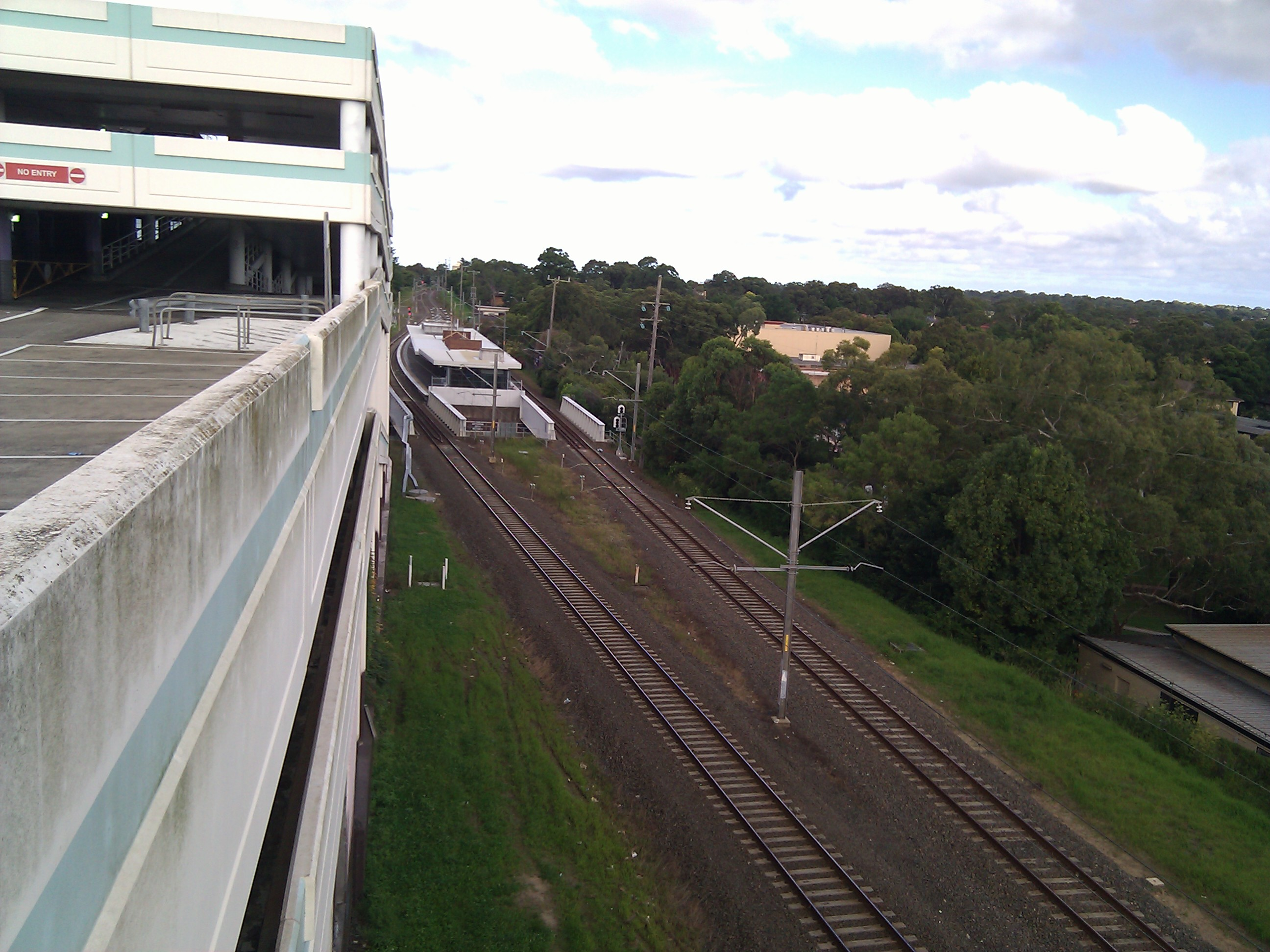
View from the Westfield roof carpark to Miranda station

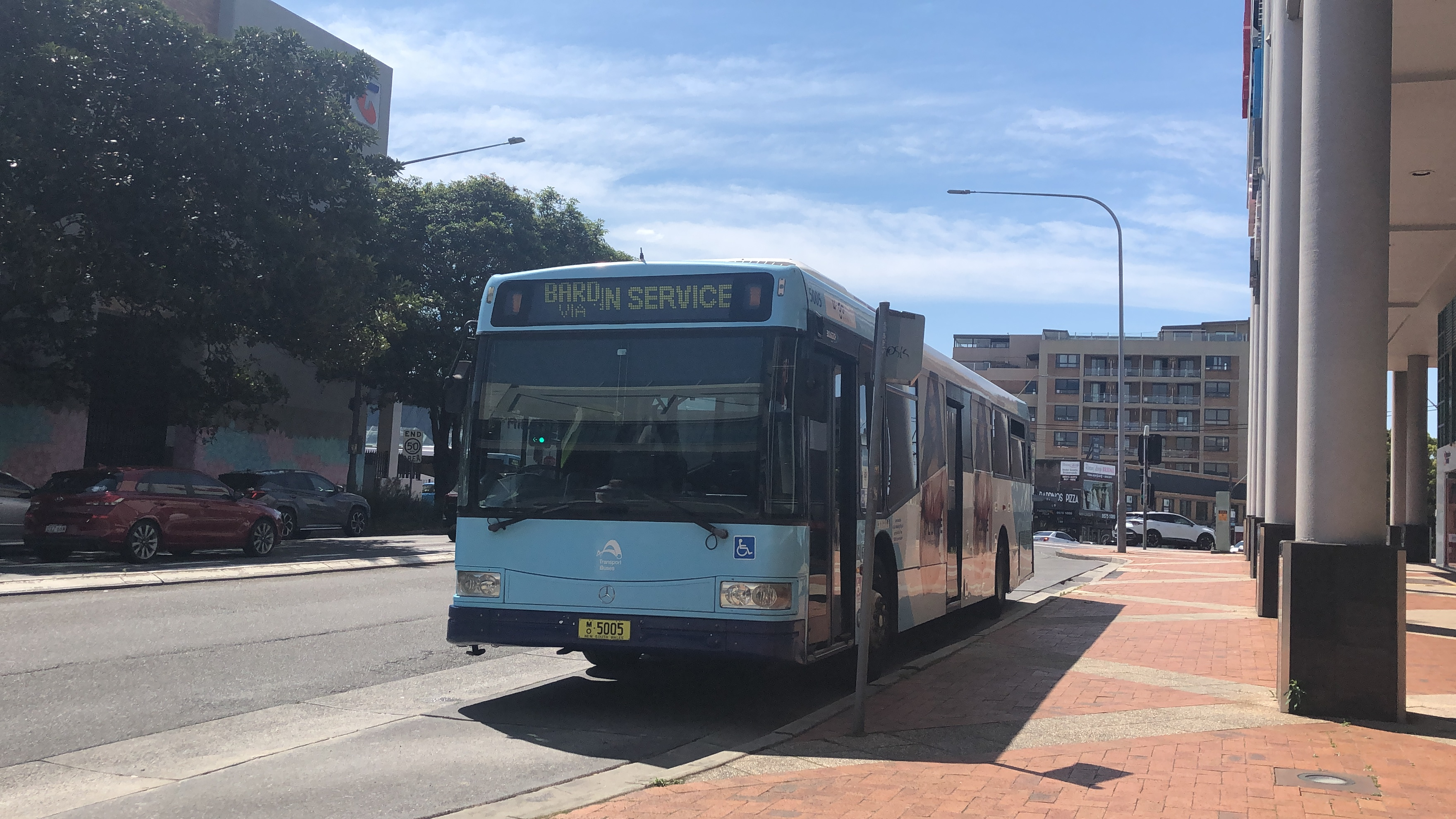
U Go Mobility Mercedes Benz 0500LE Bustech VST Mk2 5005 at Westfield Miranda

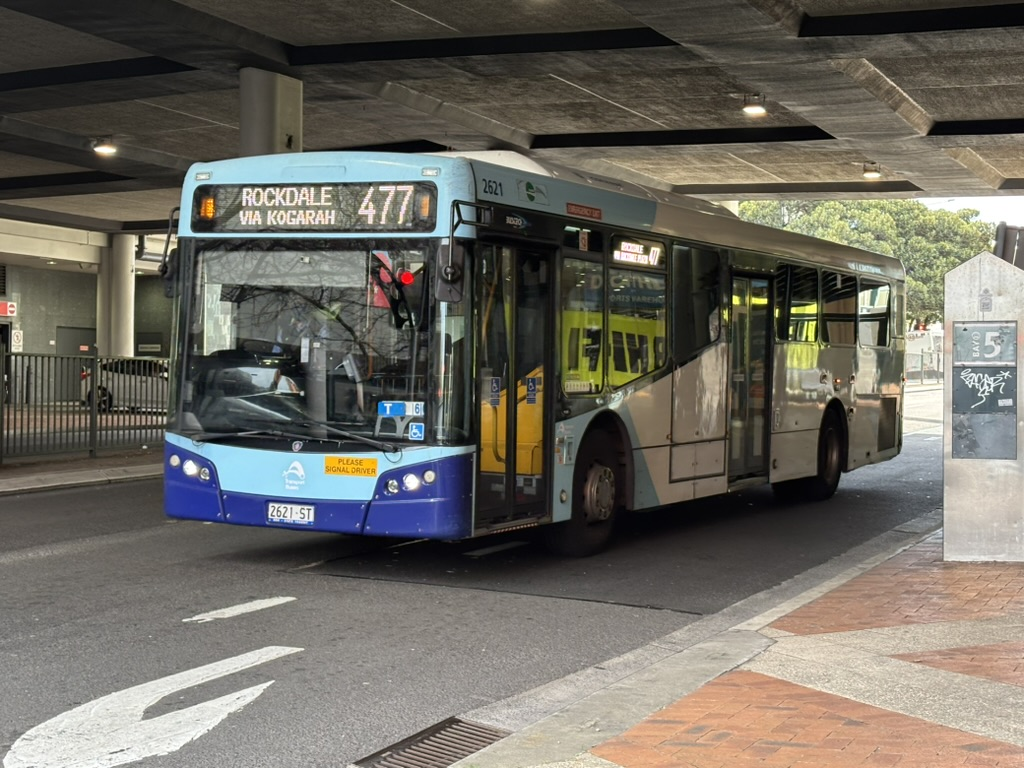
Transit Systems Scania K280UB at Westfield Miranda

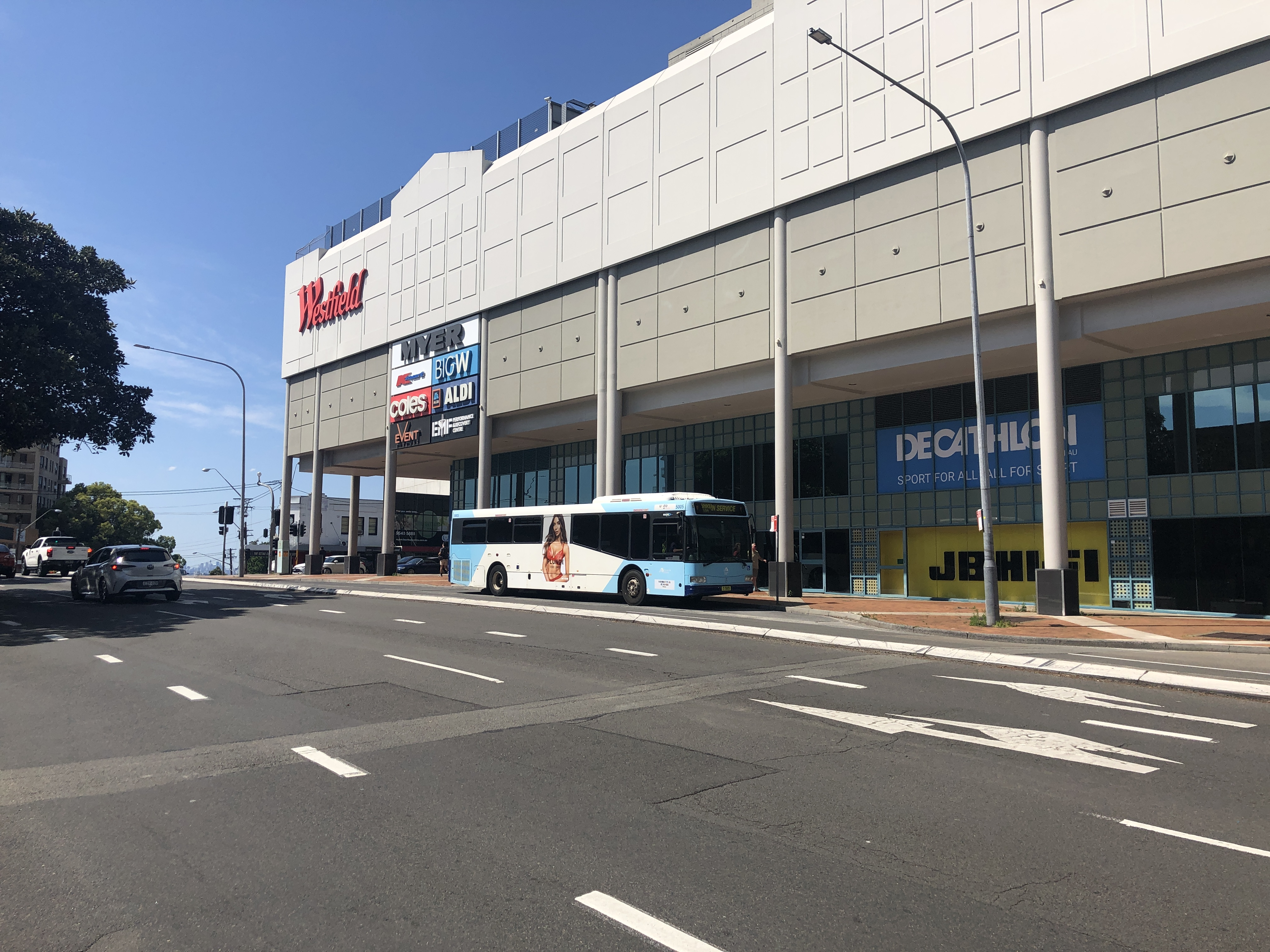
U Go Mobility Mercedes Benz 0500LE Bustech VST Mk2 5005

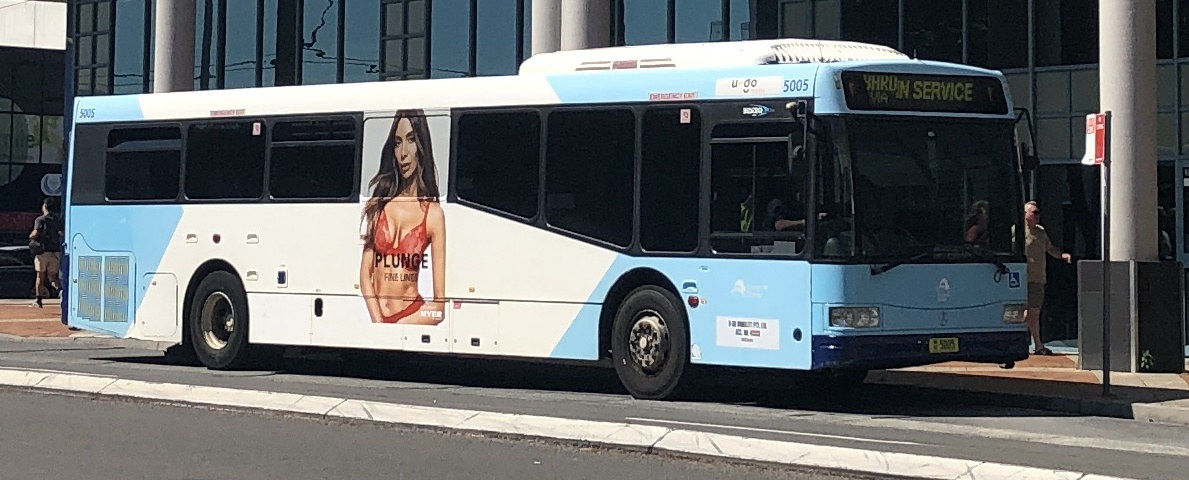
U Go Mobility Mercedes Benz 0500LE Bustech VST Mk2 5005 (cropped)

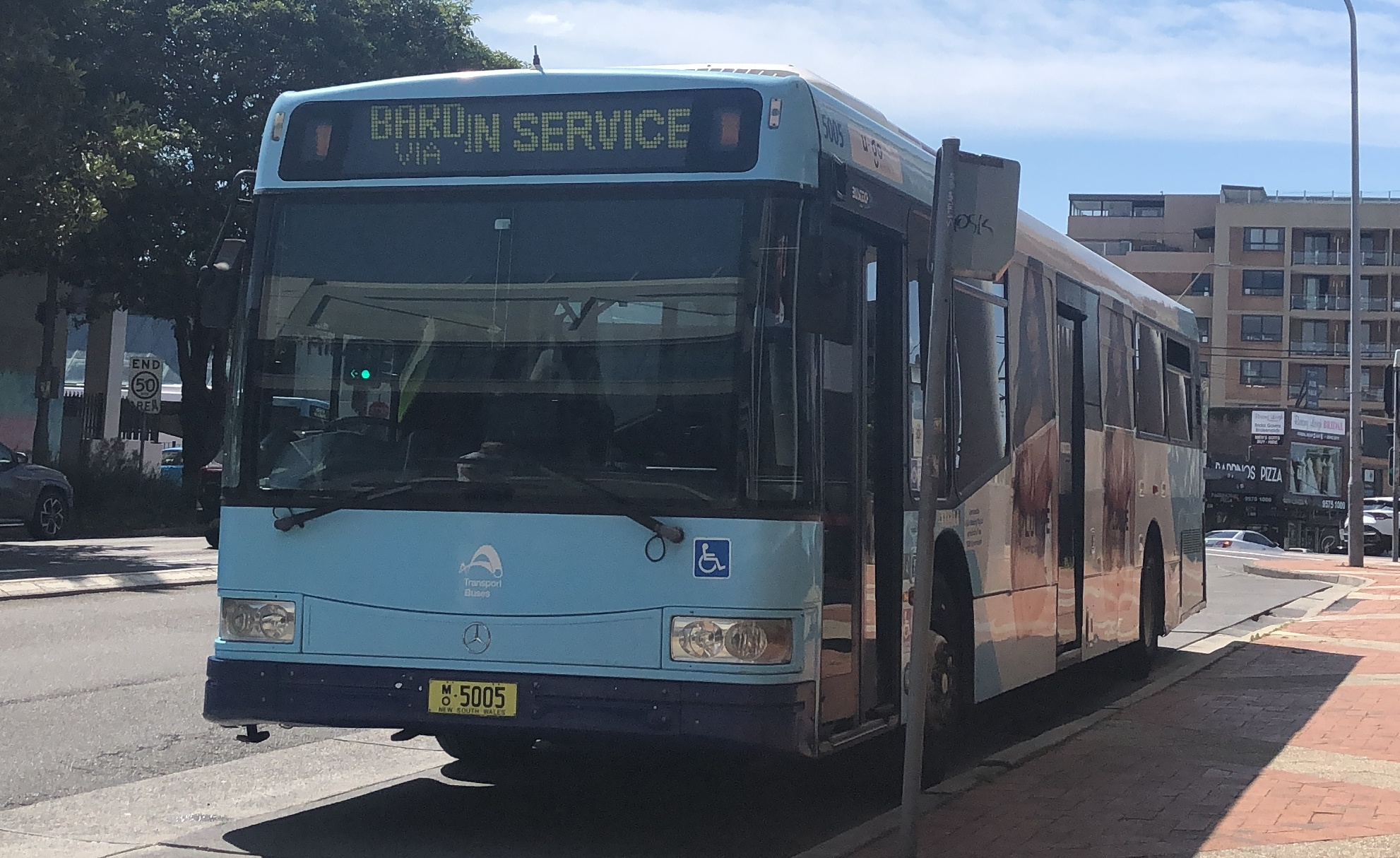
U Go Mobility Mercedes Benz 0500LE Bustech VST Mk2 5005 at Miranda (#1)

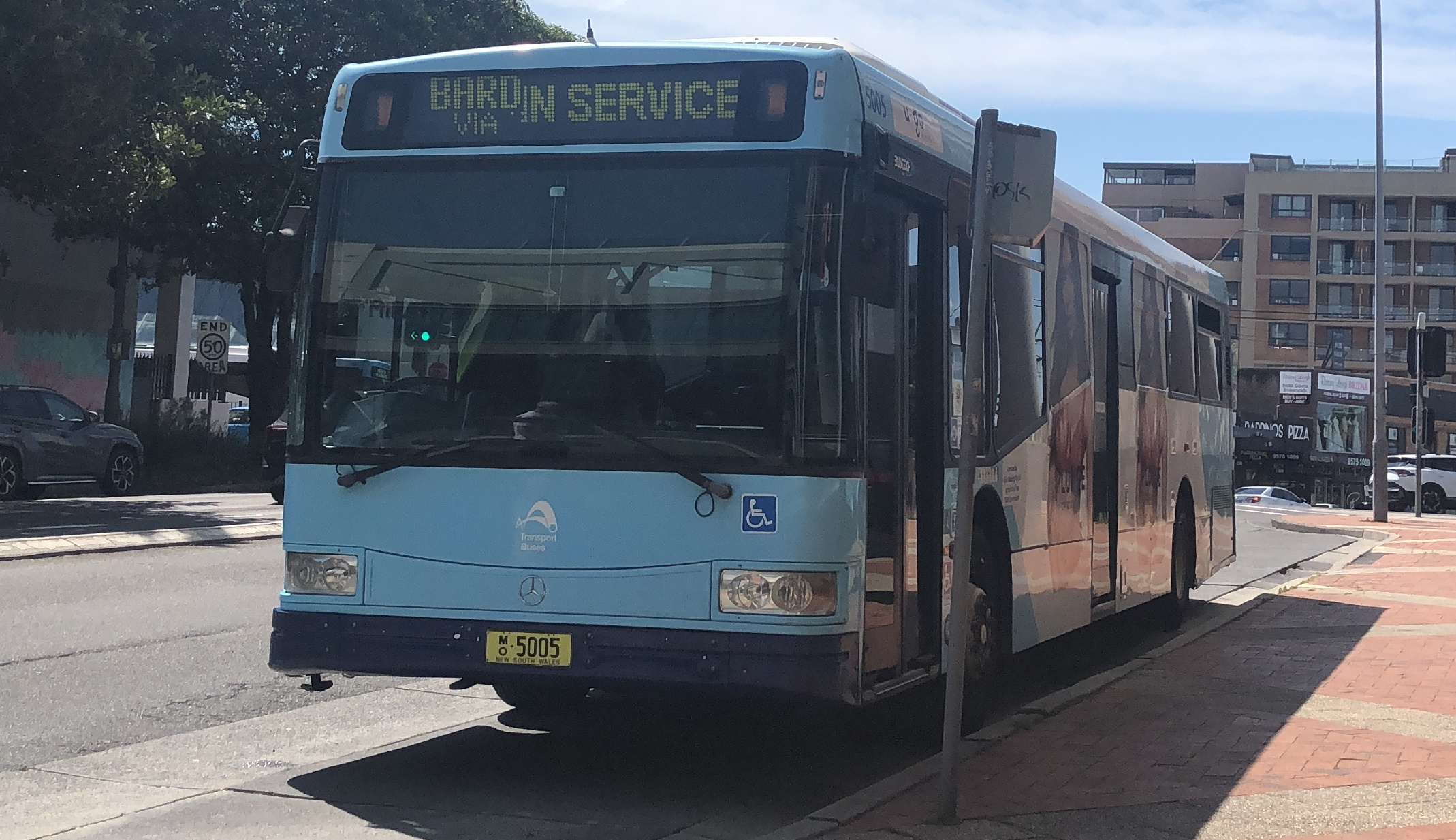
U Go Mobility Mercedes Benz 0500LE Bustech VST Mk2 5005 at Miranda (#2)

== See also ==
- List of shopping centres in Australia
