= Toys "R" Us Australia =

Defunct Australian toy retailer

Toys"R"Us ANZ Limited
- Trade name: Toys R Us Australia
- Formerly: Funtastic Limited (–2021, current company)
- Type: Private
- Traded as: ASX: TOY (2021–2025)
- Industry: E-commerce, toys, baby products, hobbies, art supplies
- Fate: Voluntary administration
- Owner: Directed Group
- Subsidiaries: Toys "R" Us / Babies "R" Us (Toys R Us Licensee Pty Ltd); Hobby Warehouse (Pty Ltd); RIOT Arts & Craft (Riot Creativity Pty Ltd)
- Website: www.toysrus.com.au

Toys "R" Us Australia is the Australian franchise of the American toy retailer Toys "R" Us. The brand entered the Australian market in 1993 and operated a chain of toy stores until entering administration in 2018 following the bankruptcy of its United States parent company. After failing to secure a buyer, all Australian stores closed later that year. The franchise was relaunched as an online retailer by Hobby Warehouse in 2019 before being acquired by Toys "R" Us ANZ (then Funtastic Limited) in 2021. Following the voluntary administration of Toys "R" Us ANZ in 2025, the business was acquired by Directed Electronics Australia.

== History ==
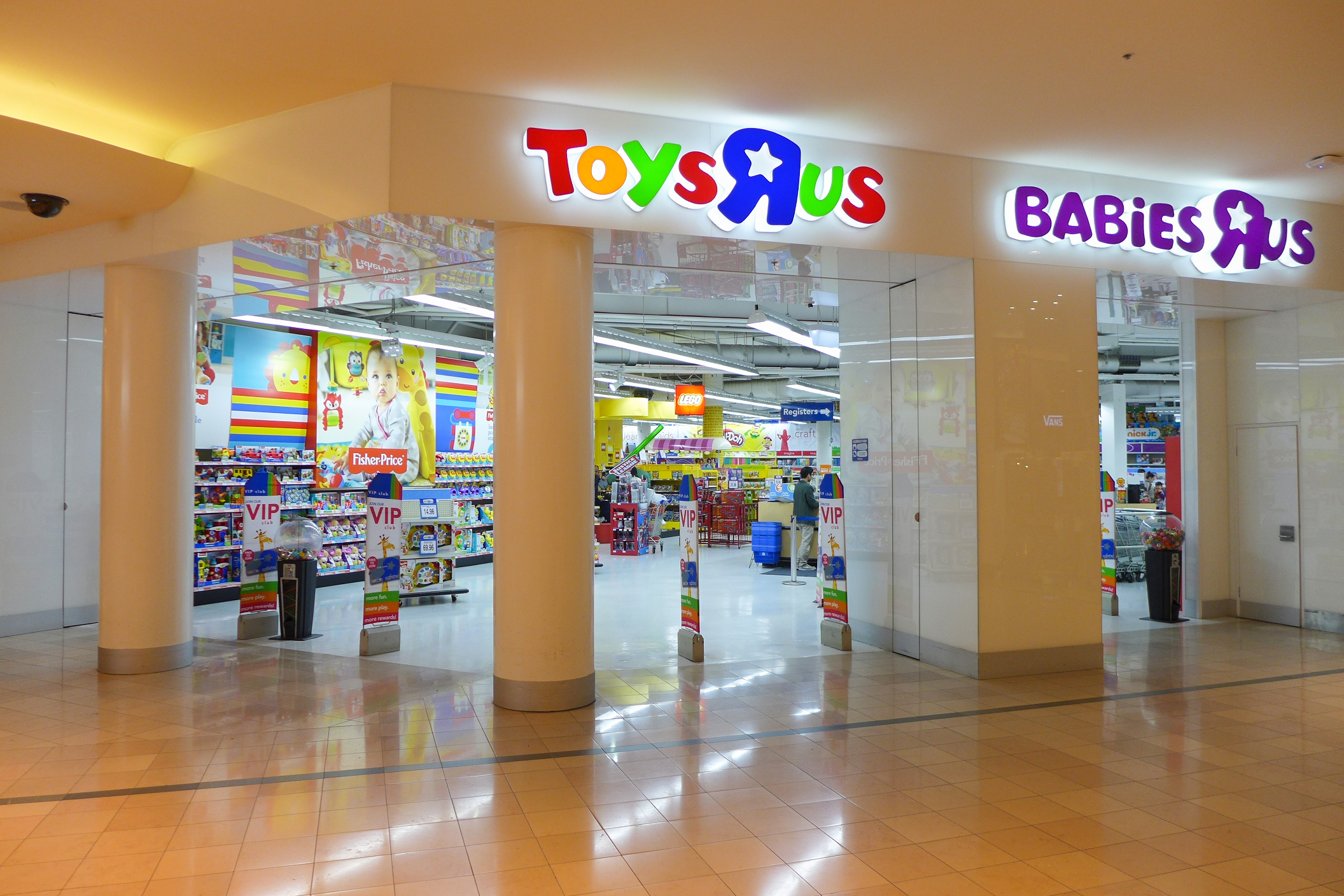
Toys "R" Us in Chadstone Shopping Centre in 2017

Toys "R" Us came to Australia in March 1993. The company, hoping to destroy the toy sector, reportedly almost never made a profit, compounded by native, more ever-present competitors with more general merchandise, such as Kmart Australia, as well as a lack of overall spending on toys in the country compared to other countries it previously entered.

In 1993, Coles-Myer felt insecure in the upcoming opening of Toys "R" Us, as they felt that it would interfere with the toy sales of their department stores such as Kmart. In response to this, Coles-Myer opened a competing toy-focused store, dubbed World 4 Kids, a mere six weeks before the grand opening of the Australian Toys "R" Us stores. World 4 Kids had opened to humble success, with stores opening in Bankstown, Chatswood, Penrith, Miranda, Clayton, Southland, Aspley, Maroochydore, Loganholme and Southport, among others. Unfortunately, World 4 Kids was not able to hold up against the extreme success of Toys "R" Us, resulting in a loss of roughly 36 million dollars per year for Coles-Myer, and overall loss of 200 million dollars by the time the chain was forced to close in 2002. However, Toys "R" Us did not receive immediate success either, only beginning to make a profit of roughly 13-14 million dollars per year starting from 1994. Upon the closure of all World 4 Kids stores, Coles-Myer converted many of them into Kmart locations due to their large department store spaces, however some (see Westfield Miranda) were converted into Toys "R" Us locations, further losing the "race".

Toys "R" Us in Australia was referred to as a category killer.

Toys "R" Us entered voluntary administration on 22 May 2018, following its parent's bankruptcy, appointing administrators from McGrathNicol. On June 20, it was announced that all of their Australian stores would be closing as well. The closure of all 44 stores was concluded on August 5, 2018.

On 5 June 2019, Toys "R" Us returned in Australia when Tru Kids partnered with Hobby Warehouse to relaunch the website for the chain. In 2023, they announced that Toys "R" Us would return to Australia. Hobby Warehouse and Toys "R" Us were acquired by Funtastic in 2021, who changed their name to Toys"R"Us ANZ.

In 2024 Toys "R" Us acquired Riot Art & Craft. Riot previously made headlines by suddenly going into creditors voluntary liquidation in late 2020 during the COVID-19 pandemic, immediately closing all its 56 bricks-and-mortar stores and sacking its 300 workers by text message (passing them to the liquidator), not before selling its website to a 'related company', initially sparking fears of director or practitioner misconduct.

On 5 June 2025, following years of losses, the company placed itself into voluntary administration as well, telling the Australian Securities Exchange "that the company is, or is likely to become, insolvent". They appointed BDO as administrators.

On 31 July 2025, the company was taken over by Directed Electronics Australia in a deed of company arrangement and delisted from the ASX.
