= List of places in Florida: E =

This list of current cities, towns, unincorporated communities, counties, and other recognized places in the U.S. state of Florida also includes information on the number and names of counties in which the place lies, and its lower and upper zip code bounds, if applicable.

Name of place	Number of counties	Counties	Lower zip code	Upper zip code
Eagle Island	1	Okeechobee		
Eagle Lake	1	Polk	33839	
Earleton	1	Alachua	32631	
Early Bird	1	Marion		
Earnestville	1	Pasco		
East Alachua	1	Alachua	32615	
East Auburndale	1	Polk	33823	
East Avenue	1	Sarasota	33577	
East Bronson	1	Levy		
Eastbrook	2	Orange, Seminole	32787	
East Dunbar	1	Lee		
East End	1	Lee	33957	
Eastern Shores	1	Miami-Dade	33162	
Eastgate	1	Manatee		
Eastgate	1	Orange	32792	
Eastgate	1	Sarasota		
East Gate Park	1	Broward		
East Hill	1	Escambia	32503	
East Lake	1	Hillsborough	33610	
East Lake	1	Marion		
East Lake	1	Pinellas		
East Lake-Orient Park	1	Hillsborough		
East Lake Park	1	Hillsborough	33610	
East Lake Weir	1	Marion	32133	
East Mandarin	1	Duval		
East Milton	1	Santa Rosa		
East Mims	1	Brevard		
East Mulberry	1	Polk	33860	
East Naples	1	Collier	33942	
East Ocean	1	Martin	33494	
East Palatka	1	Putnam	32131	
East Pensacola Heights	1	Escambia		
East Perrine	1	Miami-Dade		
Eastpoint	1	Franklin	32328	
Eastport	1	Duval		
East Rockland Key	1	Monroe	33040	
East Sarasota	1	Sarasota		
East Tampa	1	Hillsborough		
East Venice	1	Sarasota	33595	
Eastway Park	1	Broward	33441	
East Williston	1	Levy	32696	
East Winter Haven	1	Polk	33880	
Eastwood	1	Polk		
Eaton Park	1	Polk	33840	
Eatonville	1	Orange	32751	
Eau Gallie	1	Brevard	32935	
Ebb	1	Madison		
Ebro	1	Washington	32437	
Econfina	1	Bay		
Eddy	1	Baker		
Eden	1	St. Lucie		
Edgar	1	Putnam	32149	
Edge	1	Escambia		
Edgeville	1	Manatee		
Edgewater	1	Broward		
Edgewater	1	Volusia	32132	
Edgewater Gulf Beach	1	Bay	32401	
Edgewater Junction	1	Volusia		
Edgewood	1	Duval	32207	
Edgewood	1	Orange	32809	
Edison	1	Hillsborough	33547	
Edison Center	1	Miami-Dade	33150	
Edison Junction	1	Hillsborough		
Eggleston Heights	1	Duval		
Eglin Air Force Base	3	Okaloosa, Santa Rosa, Walton	32542	
Eglin Auxiliary Field No	1	Okaloosa	32578	
Eglin Auxiliary Field No	1	Okaloosa	32536	
Eglin Auxiliary Field No. 9	1	Okaloosa	32544	
Eglin Auxiliary Field No. 10	1	Santa Rosa	32570	
Eglin Village	1	Okaloosa		
Egypt Lake	1	Hillsborough	33614	
Egypt Lake-Leto	1	Hillsborough		
Ehren	1	Pasco		
El Chico	1	Monroe		
Elder Springs	1	Seminole	32771	
El Destinado	1	Leon		
Eldora	1	Volusia		
Eldorado	1	Lake		
El Dorado Acres	1	Lee	33923	
Eldred	1	St. Lucie		
Eldridge	1	Volusia		
Electra	1	Marion		
Eleven Mile	1	Franklin	32456	
Elfers	1	Pasco	34680	
El Jobean	1	Charlotte	33927	
Elkton	1	St. Johns	32033	
Ellaville	1	Jackson		
Ellaville	2	Suwannee, Madison	32060	
Ellenton	1	Manatee	34222	
Ellenton Junction	1	Manatee		
Ellerbee	1	Union		
Ellerslie	1	Pasco		
Ellinor Village	1	Volusia	32074	
Ellison Acres	1	Volusia	32069	
Ellisville	1	Columbia	32055	
Ellsworth Junction	1	Lake		
Ellyson Field	1	Escambia	32509	
Ellyson Naval Education and Training Program Development Center	1	Escambia	32509	
Ellzey	1	Levy	32683	
Elm Mission	1	Okaloosa		
Eloise	1	Polk	33880	
Eloise Woods	1	Polk	33880	
El Portal	1	Miami-Dade	33138	
El Ranchero Village	1	Manatee	33505	
Elwood	1	St. Johns		
Elwood Park	1	Manatee	33505	
Emathla	1	Marion		
Embry-Riddle Aeronautical University	1	Volusia	32014	
Empire Point	1	Duval	32201	
Emporia	1	Volusia	32080	
Enchanted Park	1	Duval	32210	
Englewood	2	Sarasota, Charlotte	33533	
Englewood	1	Duval		
Englewood Beach	1	Sarasota	34223	
Englewood Manor	1	Palm Beach	33460	
Enon	1	Escambia	32568	
Ensley	1	Escambia	32504	
Enterprise	1	Volusia	32725	
Eppes Heights	1	Leon		
Eridu	1	Taylor	32331	
Errol Estates	1	Orange	32702	
Escambia	1	Escambia		
Escambia Farms	1	Okaloosa	32531	
Espanola	1	Flagler	32010	
Esperenza	1	Putnam	32031	
Estates of Fort Lauderdale	1	Broward		
Estero	1	Lee	33928	
Estero Island	1	Lee		
Estero River Heights	1	Lee	33928	
Estiffanulga	1	Liberty	32321	
Esto	1	Holmes	32425	
Ethel	1	Lake		
Eucheeanna	1	Walton	32433	
Euclid	1	Pinellas	33704	
Eufala	1	Calhoun		
Eugene	1	Dixie		
Eureka	1	Marion	32627	
Eustis	1	Lake	32726	
Eva	1	Polk	33868	
Everglades	1	Collier	33929	
Everglades City	1	Collier	33929	
Everglades National Park	3	Collier, Miami-Dade, Monroe	33030	
Evergreen	1	Nassau	32097	
Evinston	1	Alachua	32633	
Ewell	1	Polk		
Ewing	1	Hillsborough		

== See also ==
- Florida
- List of municipalities in Florida
- List of former municipalities in Florida
- List of counties in Florida
- List of census-designated places in Florida
