= Catherine Harris =

Australian company director

Catherine Harris AO PSM FAICD
- Born: Catherine Mary Rossi
- Education: University of New South Wales
- Occupation: Company director
- Board member of: Harris Farm Markets; National Gallery of Australia; The Australian Ballet; UNSW Business School; Museum of Contemporary Art Australia; Australian Rugby League Commission (2012–2018); Sydney Cricket & Sports Ground Trust; Australia – Japan Foundation; UNSW Foundation; University of Notre Dame Australia; Papua New Guinea Chiefs
- Spouse: David Harris
- Children: 5
- Mother: Mary Rossi

Catherine Mary Harris is an Australian company director. Harris co-founded the supermarket chain Harris Farm Markets in 1971 with her husband, David. She has served as chairperson of Harris Farm Markets since 1999 and the Papua New Guinea Chiefs since 2026.

== Career ==
Harris graduated from the University of New South Wales with a Bachelor of Commerce. Following university Harris worked for both David Jones and Grace Bros. In 1971, Harris co-founded Harris Farm Markets with her husband, David.

She has previously held roles as the Deputy Chancellor University of New South Wales 1999-2003; chief executive and director of the Affirmative Action Agency; chief executive of Harris Communications (International Marketing Company); chair of Mary Rossi Travel, and chair of the St Margaret's Public and Private Hospital.

Harris previously served as a director of the National Gallery of Australia, The Australian Ballet, the Museum of Contemporary Art Australia, the Australia–Japan Foundation and as a Trustee of the Sydney Cricket & Sports Ground Trust. She served as Honorary Consul of Bhutan in Sydney from 2004 to 2019. Harris was a governor of the University of Notre Dame Australia. In February 2012 she was appointed to Australian Rugby League Commission. She served a second term before departing the commission in February 2018.

Harris co-chairs the business group Women for Change. Harris sits on the board of the Taronga Conservation Society, UNSW Business School and environmental projects investor and developer GreenCollar. In 2026, Harris was appointed chair of the National Rugby League team the Papua New Guinea Chiefs, having served on its board since 2025.

== Honours and awards ==
In 2000 Harris was awarded the Public Service Medal (PSM) "for outstanding public service as Director of the Commonwealth's Affirmative Action Agency and her role in the acceptance of affirmative action by Australia's business community." She was awarded the Centenary Medal on 1 January 2001 "for service to Australian society in business leadership".

In 2006 Harris was appointed an Officer of the Order of Australia (AO) "for service to community development through leadership roles in organisations related to education, health care, advancement of the status of women, the Catholic Church, the arts and sport, and to international relations between Australia and Asia, particularly support for Bhutanese people living in Australia."

The UNSW Business School awarded Harris with an Honorary Doctorate of Business in 2008; and she is a Fellow of the Australian Institute of Company Directors (FAICD). In 2019, the King of Bhutan Jigme Khesar Namgyel Wangchuck conferred the National Order of Merit Gold to Harris in recognition of her services to Bhutan.

== Personal life ==
Harris was the first born daughter of Theo and Mary Rossi. She married David Harris, who, she had first met when they were both children and later reconnected with while completing her undergraduate degree. They have five sons.
