= East Gate Range =

Mountain range in Nevada, United States

- Location within Nevada

Highest point
- Elevation: 1,943 m (6,375 ft)

Geography
- Country: United States
- State: Nevada
- District: Churchill County
- Range coordinates: 39°14′19.727″N 117°53′31.426″W
- Topo map: USGS Quartz Mountain NW

The East Gate Range is a mountain range in Churchill County, Nevada.
