= Harris Farm Markets =

Australian supermarket chain

- Industry: Retail
- Founded: 1971; 55 years ago
- Founder: David Harris; Catherine Harris
- Headquarters: Sydney Markets, Sydney, New South Wales, Australia
- Number of locations: 33 stores (2025)
- Key people: Angus Harris (Co-CEO); Luke Harris (Co-CEO); Catherine Harris (Chairperson)
- Products: Fruit; Groceries; Vegetables
- Revenue: ▲ A$925.5 million (2025)
- Net income: ▲ -A$11.4 million (2025)
- Number of employees: 3,000 (2025)
- Website: harrisfarm.com.au

Harris Farm Markets is an Australian fresh fruit and grocery retail chain with over 30 locations across New South Wales, Queensland and the Australian Capital Territory. The markets specialise in fresh fruit, vegetables, cheeses, breads, perishable, butchery and grocery products.

The majority of stores are within Greater Sydney, along with Canberra, Brisbane, Newcastle, Albury and the Gold Coast.

They are one of Australia's largest independent fruit and vegetable grocers. The company is often involved in a variety of sustainability and community initiatives, including their promotion of 'odd-shaped' fruit called "Imperfect Picks" at lower prices in an initiative to reduce landfills and reusing packaging boxes for customer shopping.

== History ==
Harris Farm Markets was established in 1971 by David and Catherine Harris with a single shop in Villawood. The company faced possible bankruptcy in the 1990s when an investor pulled out. Following this, the company rebuilt itself.

The interior of a Harris Farm Markets store in Canberra

Harris Farm Markets was the first Australian exclusively market-style fruit and vegetable retailer to open in a supermarket-style operation. Harris Farm Markets stock fruit and vegetables, cheeses, deli items, and gourmet groceries. It was the first Australian store to introduce a ‘imperfect picks’ concept to combat food waste with offers of discounts on off-cuts and odd-shaped fruit and vegetables. Several long-standing stores that were open for decades like Eastgate Bondi Junction and the franchised and independently-run Edgecliff site have closed with more modern replacements nearby since 2019.

In 2013, leadership of the company was passed to three of the five Harris sons, Tristan, Angus and Luke, who shared the title of CEO. Tristan Harris stepped down from the executive role in 2023.

In January 2026, Harris Farm Markets and Amazon entered a partnership to sell fresh food on Amazon's website, beginning with 80 Sydney suburbs. The partnership is the first time fresh food will be available on Amazon in Australia.
