= Ellinor Village, Florida =

Resort in Ormond Beach, Florida, United States

Coordinates: 29°16′48″N 81°02′27″W

Ellinor Village was the largest family resort in Florida in the 1940s and 1950s. It was built in Ormond Beach, Florida, by Byron Ellinor and his brother Merrill, and comprised 660 “cottages” and apartments. Ellinor Village resort opened on May 1, 1949, with triplexes, duplexes and single-family units for rent.

The resort was a real family destination with plenty of activities for kids and adults alike; however, Jews were not welcome, or "for restricted clientele", as the brochure explained in euphemistic terms. Ellinor Village had its own shopping center and amusement park and was just steps from the beach. In 1951, Merrill Ellinor purchased what is today the golf course at Oceanside Country Club. The golf course was originally part of the Ormond Hotel (owned by John Anderson) and adjacent to John D. Rockefeller's winter home; "The Casements".

In 1954 the Mrs. America contest was held at Ellinor Village, which attracted nationwide publicity. The opening of the Rockefeller Memorial Bridge was also in 1954. It has since been replaced by the Granada Bridge which was built in 1983.

Today the Ormond Hotel is gone; the Ormond Heritage condominiums now sits on the site. The original cupola from the hotel sits in a riverside park across from the condos. The history of Ellinor Village is rich, and the duplexes and triplexes that the Ellinors built have been modernized and renovated into beautiful homes and rental units.

Ellinor Village was sold to Milton Pepper, a local developer in the late 1950s. Pepper was also the man who bought the Ormond Hotel and then built the Ormond Heritage after the city of Ormond Beach would not let him restore the historic hotel. Pepper sold Ellinor Village in the late 1970s and it became a housing development.
