= East Gate Square =

- Location: Mount Laurel/Moorestown, New Jersey, United States
- Coordinates: 39.9434°N 74.9497°W
- Opened: 1993
- Developer: BPG Properties
- Manager: BPG Properties
- Floor area: 888,842 square feet (82,576.1 m^{2})
- Floors: 1
- Public transit: NJ Transit bus: 407, 457; BurLink bus: B9
- Website: www.eastgatesquare.com

East Gate Square is a shopping center complex located along the border between Moorestown and Mount Laurel in New Jersey. East Gate Square is adjacent to the Moorestown Mall and is accessible from Interstate 295, Route 38, and Route 73.

The shopping complex consists of six buildings with a total of 888,842 square feet (82,576.1 m^{2}) of retail space. The six shopping centers were developed by BPG Properties between 1992 and 2002, and the first one opened in 1993.

== Buildings ==
- Phase I – 371,600 square feet (34,520 m^{2})
- Phase II – 154,742 square feet (14,376.0 m^{2})
- Phase III – 129,016 square feet (11,986.0 m^{2})
- Phase IV – 99,561 square feet (9,249.5 m^{2})
- Phase V – 94,680 square feet (8,796 m^{2})
- Phase VI – 36,243 square feet (3,367.1 m^{2})
