= Eastgate Bondi Junction =

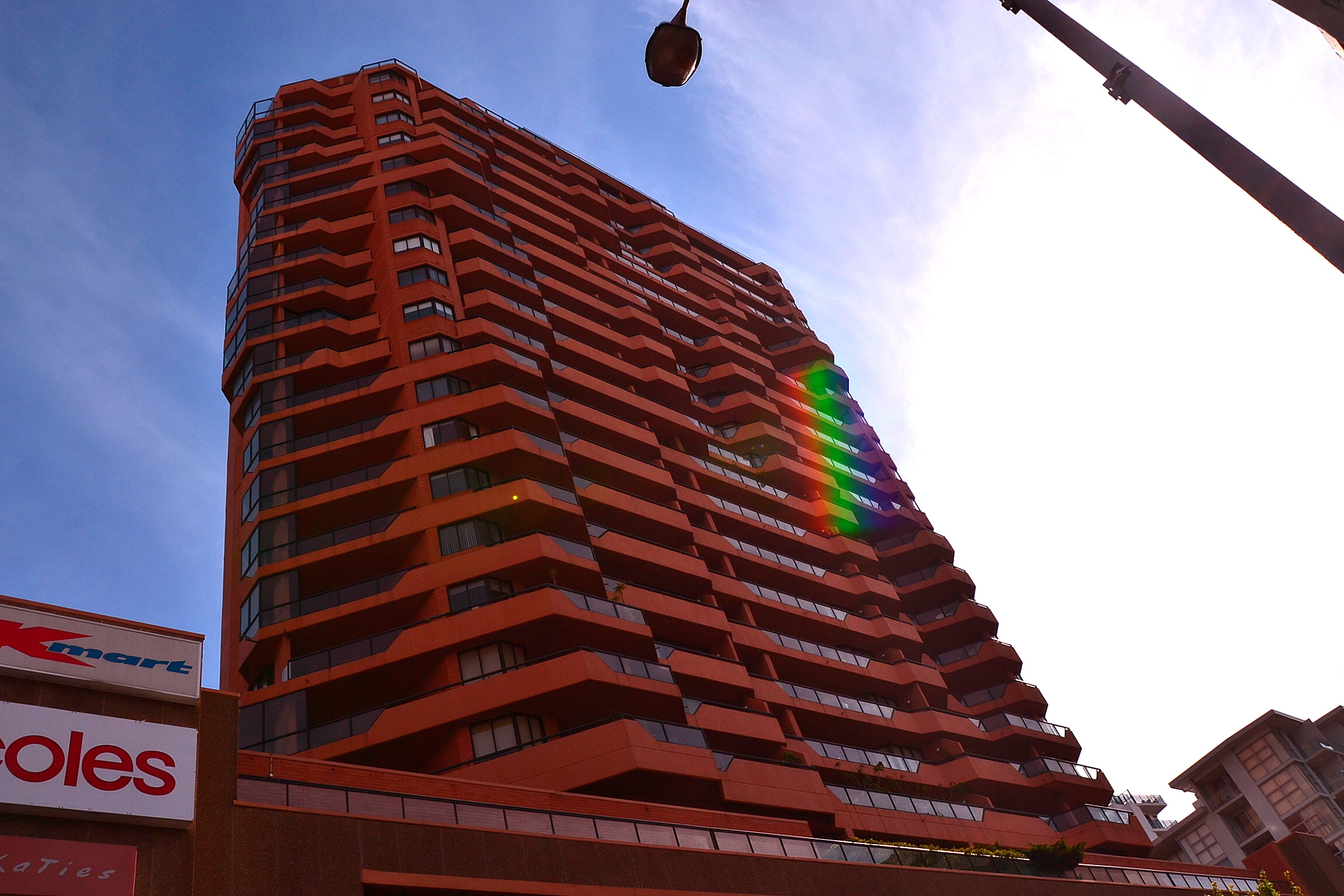
- Looking up to the Eastgate apartments from the ground
- Location: Bondi Junction, New South Wales, Australia
- Coordinates: 33°53′33″S 151°14′54″E
- Address: 71-91 Spring Street
- Opened: 1983
- Manager: JLL
- Owner: Charter Hall
- Num. of stores: 35
- Num. of anchor tenants: 3
- Floor area: 15,491 m^{2} (166,740 sq ft)
- Floors: 4
- Parking: 923
- Public transit: Bondi Junction railway station
- Website: eastgatebondijunction.com.au

Eastgate Bondi Junction is a shopping centre in the suburb of Bondi Junction in the Eastern Suburbs of Sydney, Australia.

== History ==
Eastgate Bondi Junction opened in 1983 below the Eastgate residential apartment and included Kmart, Coles New World and Harris Farm Markets in the level below Kmart in basement car park level. It was the fourth shopping centre in Bondi Junction to be built after Grace Bros, The Carousel and Bondi Junction Plaza. It is now the second shopping centre in the suburb to the much larger Westfield Bondi Junction just 350m away.

Eastgate Bondi Junction underwent a redevelopment in March 2013 with the mezzanine level and amenities refurbished and an Aldi Supermarket, The Reject Shop and many new stores added. Some existing stores including Lowes, Liquorland, Soul Origin, Specsavers, Blooms The Chemist, Australia Post, The Reject Shop and Just Cuts were refurbished with new ones like KFC.

Harris Farm Markets closed on 3 April 2018 with a large, modern Harris Farm Markets opened in Westfield Bondi Junction opposite Coles, down the road. The space vacated by Harris Farm was replaced by Dan Murphy's which opened on 16 December 2020.

In July 2019 Eastgate Bondi Junction underwent a facelift which included a new facade. David Wilson Chemist drugstore and Habitania furniture store closed. Work on the new awning and facade commenced on 29 July 2019 and was completed in late 2019. Several stores shuttered with COVID pandemic and remain empty lots as of 2022. This facelift also included a number of new stores including a KFC and Coles also underwent a facelift which was completed on 26 September 2020 and is considered the 'poshest' in Australia.

== Incidents ==
- On 30 March 2009, a gas leak caused the evacuation of the apartment and shopping centre below. Two men were seriously burnt after the gas explosion on the top floor believed to be the 28th floor. The men who burnt were believed to be working on the air conditioning unit on the rooftop.
- On 10 August 2018, a major gas leak caused the evacuation of the apartments and shopping centre below after workmen hit the gas main. The centre has since reopened.
- On 23 December 2024, a suspicious package spotted between KrazyBird and Coles around 11 am caused the evacuation of the shopping centre due to the belief of a bomb inside of the package. The centre reopened around half an hour later with the package being identified as a battery and that there were “no suspicious circumstances”.
