= Smiggle =

Australian stationery store chain

- Type: Subsidiary
- Industry: Office supply retailing
- Founded: 2003
- Founder: Stephen Meurs; Peter Pausewang
- Headquarters: Richmond, Victoria, Australia
- Number of locations: 123 stores in Australia (2023)
- Area served: Australia; New Zealand; Singapore; United Kingdom; China; Malaysia; Ireland; United Arab Emirates; Qatar
- Products: Stationery, accessories, toys
- Parent: Premier Investments
- Website: smiggle.com

Smiggle is an Australian-based retail store chain that sells stationery and related accessories. It was founded in Melbourne by Stephen Meurs and Peter Pausewang in 2003 and acquired by the Just Group in July 2007. As of February 2016, the chain has stores located across Australia (135), New Zealand (23), Singapore (17), United Kingdom (100), Hong Kong (14), Malaysia (22) and Ireland (6). Smiggle is renowned for its use of vibrant bold colours and quirky graphics on most of its branded products.

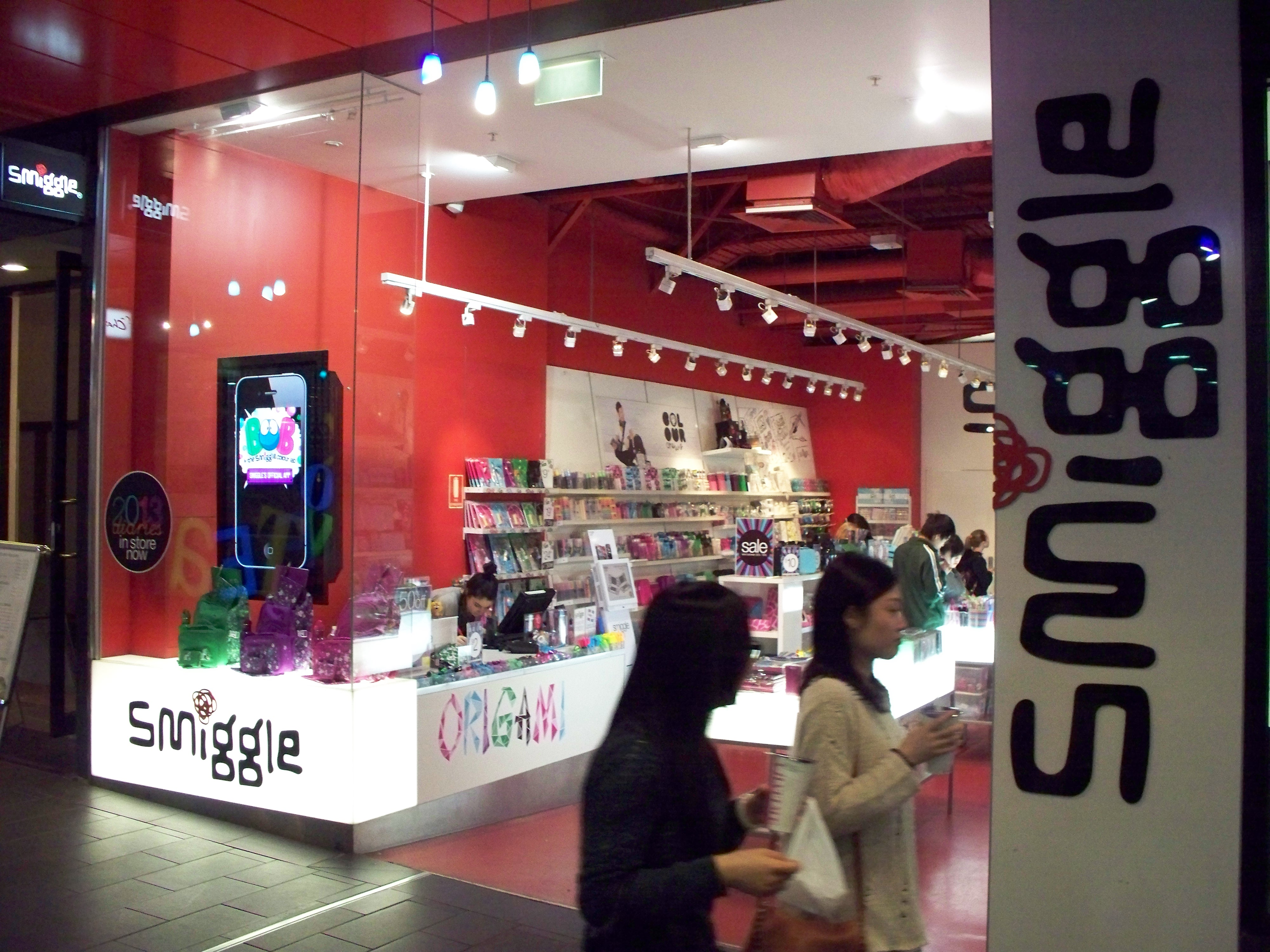
A former Smiggle outlet within Melbourne Central, located in the Melbourne central business district. Closed in early-2013, a larger store opened later that year within the same centre.

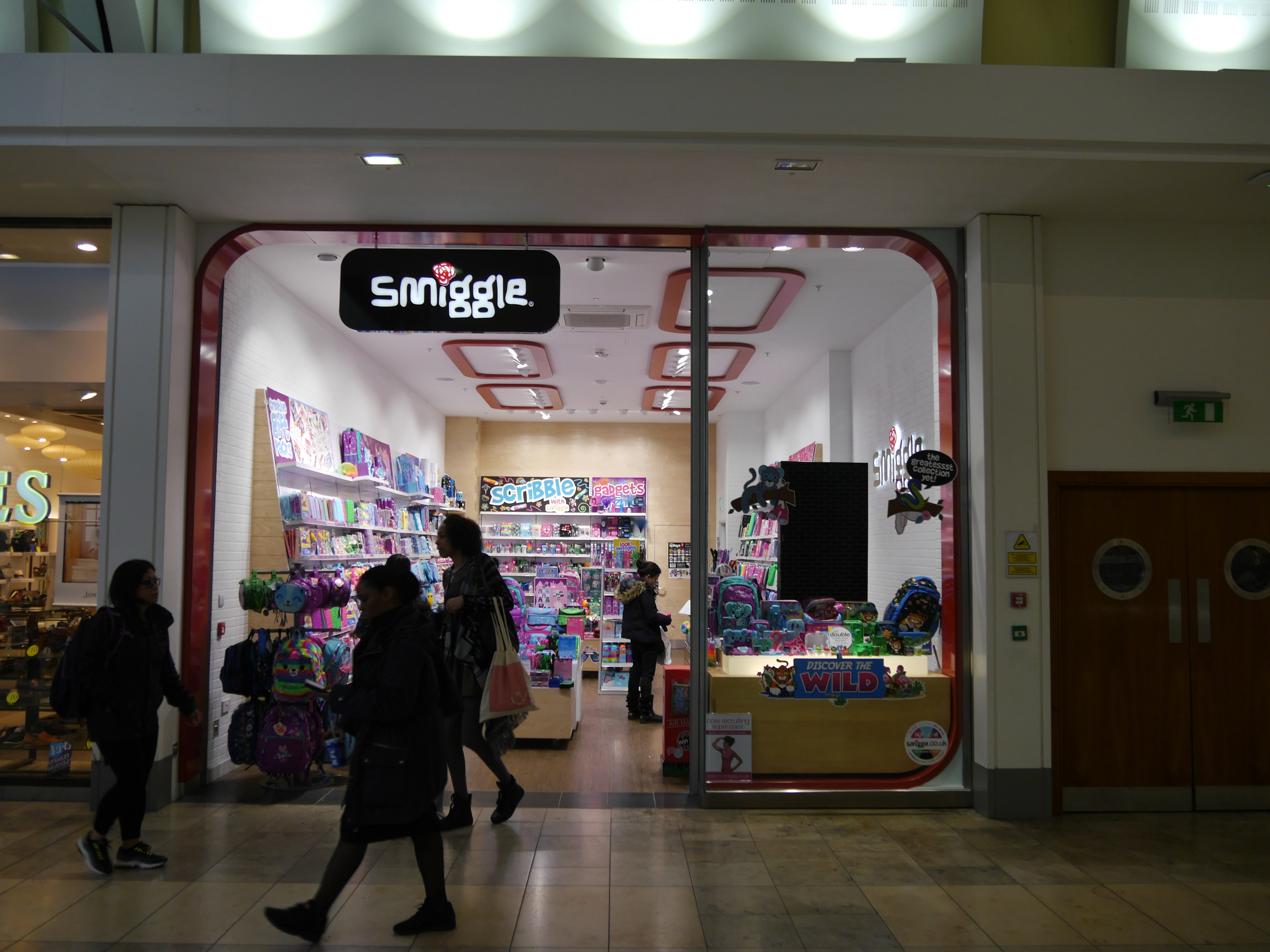
Smiggle, Southside Wandsworth, London, England (2016)

== History ==
Smiggle started as an idea by Stephen Meurs and Peter Pausewang who saw a gap in the market for fun, engaging, collectable, fashionable, and affordable stationery aimed at the 5 to 14 year age group. In late 2002, Meurs started designing, developing and producing the first lines of Smiggle stationery, while Kate Martino was tasked to look for suitable retail sites around Melbourne. They decided on the name, 'Smiggle' as a mashup word for smile and giggle, reflecting their aims for the products. In addition to retailing, Meurs and Pausewang wanted to get into wholesaling, so they entered as late applicants in a Sydney trade fair with just two weeks to prepare. Commenting on that first trade fair, Martino told Dynamic Business; "To our amazement the reaction we got was overwhelming so we thought, well we're onto something here." The Smiggle team then recruited a wholesale manager, allowing the wholesaling and retailing arms of the new business to grow in tandem.

In March 2003, Smiggle opened its first retail outlet on Chapel Street, South Yarra, a famous shopping, dining and entertainment precinct within inner-Melbourne. "We branded our product very quickly from the early days, and we did that simply by choosing where we sat our stores," adds Martino. "We sat down as a team and worked out where we felt we needed to chase the sites and set up the original Smiggle stores. Given we're all Melbourne people and it's the city we know best, we purposely chose our sites in Melbourne close to schools, private girls schools and areas where we felt we could easily brand the product. But we realised for the retail aspect to grow we needed many sites," she explains. "So from South Yarra we opened [the second outlet at] Westfield Southland, which was our very first centre store. We then opened Brighton, Melbourne Central, Hawthorn and so on."

In July 2007, the Just Group acquired the chain for a reported $29 million, making it the seventh brand they acquired (along with Just Jeans, Jay Jays, Portmans, Jacqui E, Dotti, and Peter Alexander) and the first outside fashion retailing. The managing director of the Just Group, Jason Murray said; "While it is our first move outside apparel, it is an ideal fit with our existing brands, infrastructure and target demographic, and is consistent with our stated aim of acquiring fashion-based retail assets that are relatively immature". At that stage, Smiggle consisted of 3 street-side stores and 15 shopping centre locations (11 in Melbourne, 5 in Sydney, and 2 in Brisbane), with limited wholesale distribution to 80 Australia Post outlets and Smiggle-branded stands within Myer department stores.

In August 2008, Solomon Lew's public company vehicle, Premier Investments, took over Just Group for $810 million, delisting the public company from the Australian Securities Exchange.

In December 2008, Smiggle opened its first overseas store in New Zealand.

In March 2009, Smiggle was the subject of national controversy when they commenced selling voodoo doll pencil cases which included a space to place a small photo, complete with accompanying black and red heart-shaped pins to stick into the doll-shaped item. The product was blamed for one case involving a 13-year-old girl being bullied by other school pupils using it. "Kids Free 2B Kids" lobby group director Julie Gale told the media, "I think it's typical lack of awareness from retailers... just thinking it's a cute idea not really thinking it through," adding, "It's just not appropriate." A week later Smiggle withdrew the pencil cases from shelves, leaving the chain's Manager for Retail Operations, Kate Martino to write, "It was certainly never our intention to have our product used in a negative manner."

As of September 2009, the chain had 65 stores located across Australia.

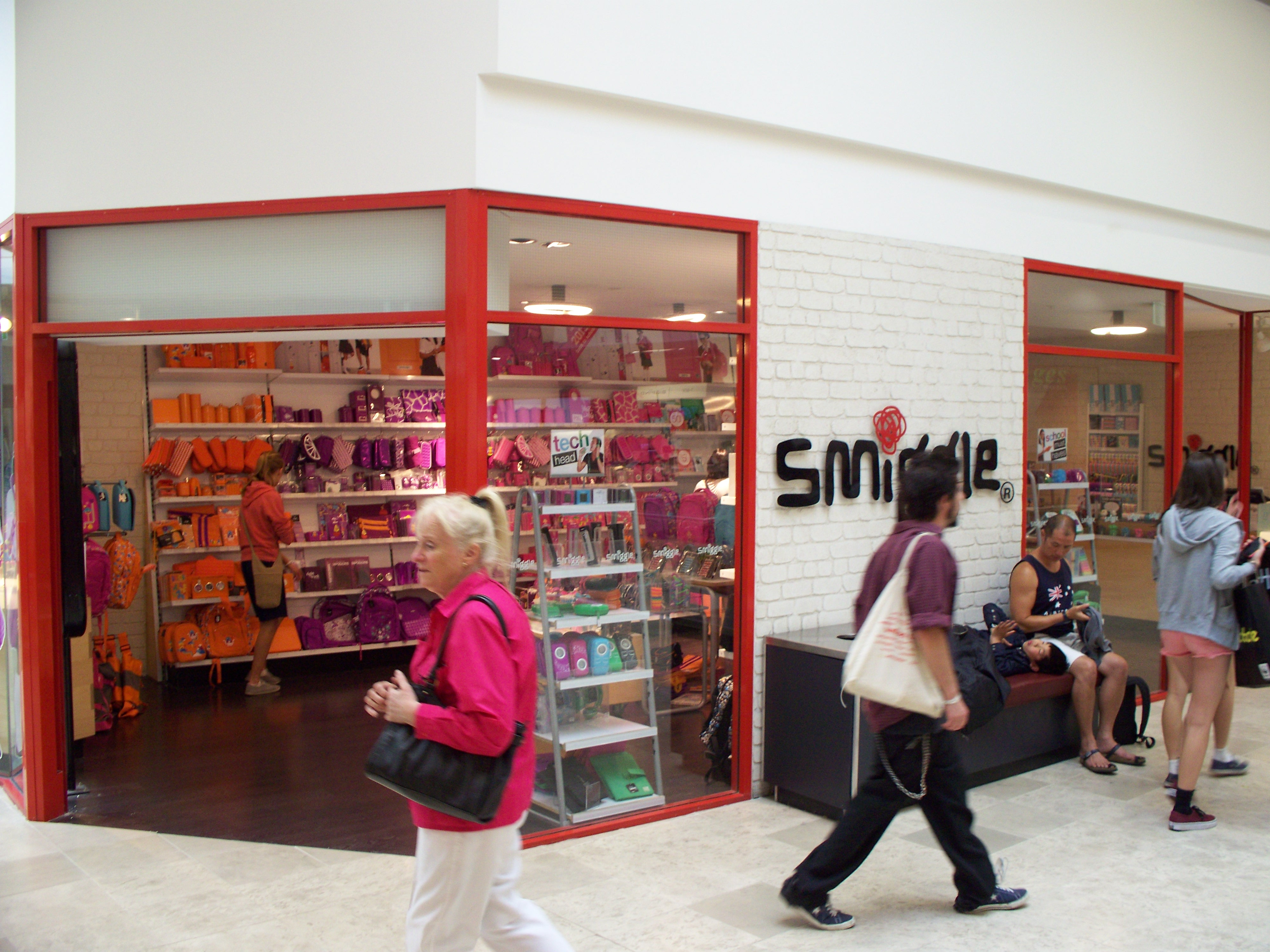
A Smiggle outlet in Cat & Fiddle Arcade in the Hobart central business district

In April 2010, The Just Group and Lagardère Group's Asia Pacific subsidiary, LS Travel Retail, announced the company had licensed the Smiggle brand in order to open three travel retail outlets at Melbourne Airport, Adelaide Airport and Gold Coast Airport, with the option to open more in the Asia Pacific region. They have since opened another store in Melbourne Airport and one in Cairns Airport.

In September 2010, Smiggle was bestowed with the Australia Retailers Association's Retailer of the Year at the annual Australian Retail Awards.

In April 2011, Smiggle expanded into Singapore with its first shop opening in Plaza Singapura, closely followed by another outlet within Lot One. As of June 2013, the Singaporean network has grown to a total of 14 stores. The Just Group announced that eight out of the top ten most profitable Smiggle stores were located in Singapore, adding that they were also looking for new Asian retail locations in Japan, Malaysia and Indonesia to open in 2013. However, by September 2013, Premier Investments admitted that after further examination of the Japanese market, Smiggle's possible expansion there was unlikely because its target market was "already saturated."

In mid-2012, it was announced that Smiggle's sales grew by 14% to A$78.3 million in the 52 weeks (a year) to 28 July 2012.

In October 2012, Smiggle's store count consisted; 100 stores across Australia, 23 in New Zealand, and 13 in Singapore.

In mid-2013, the New Zealand Herald found after one visit to Willowbank School that most children have stationery bought from Smiggle. One boy said, "the rubbers don't really work. [But they come in quirky shapes and colours and] smell nice". Another student admitted that the products are expensive - "[$11 for a pencil case. No better than the one] my mum bought at the $2 shop for $2." However, the products are so highly prized that some children leave them at home in case they get stolen. At that time, John Addis, a director at Intelligent Investor, warned potential investors in a Sydney Morning Herald piece that, "Smiggle has 'fad' written all over it. 'Hot' brands tend to cool." Adding he "wouldn't want to bet on the chain's long-term durability."

In August 2013, the company instructed property agents to search for suitable locations in the south-east of the United Kingdom in order to open five to six initial test stores in the 2014 fiscal year. The first store opened in February 2014 within Westfield Stratford City breaking the chain's one-day sales record, previously held by the first Singaporean store. Smiggle Group General Manager, John Cheston said he hopes to reach the 200-250 store target in four to five years, adding that the UK will "unquestionably" be the retailer's biggest market globally. That month it was also reported that Smiggle's sales grew a further 18.1% in financial year, 2012/13.

In October 2013, Smiggle had 150 stores in Australia; 23 in New Zealand; and 17 in Singapore.

In 2016, Smiggle opened its first store in Ireland in Dundrum. In 2017, stores were planned for Dublin City, Cork City and Limerick. In October 2017, Smiggle opened new store at the Trafford Centre, its 110th UK store. In the same month Smiggle added jewellery to its product line-up.

As of January 2018, Smiggle has 138 stores open in the UK, rising from 42 in January 2016.

In March 2019, Smiggle announced it would sell its products in South Korea, Thailand, Indonesia, the Philippines and the United Arab Emirates through local partners and in Canada, France, Italy, Germany and Spain through Amazon.

In September 2023, Smiggle signed an agreement with their existing Middle East wholesale partner to open 60 stores over the next decade in the United Arab Emirates, Qatar, Oman and Bahrain.

In March 2024, Premier Investments announced plans to spin off Smiggle into an independent company by the end of January 2025. However, in September 2024, Premier decided to postpone the demerger to focus on a possible sale of its Apparel Brands business to Myer. Earlier in September, Premier Investments also sacked Smiggle chief executive John Cheston for "serious misconduct and a serious breach of his employment terms". Three other Smiggle executives resigned following Cheston's sacking.

== Style and products ==
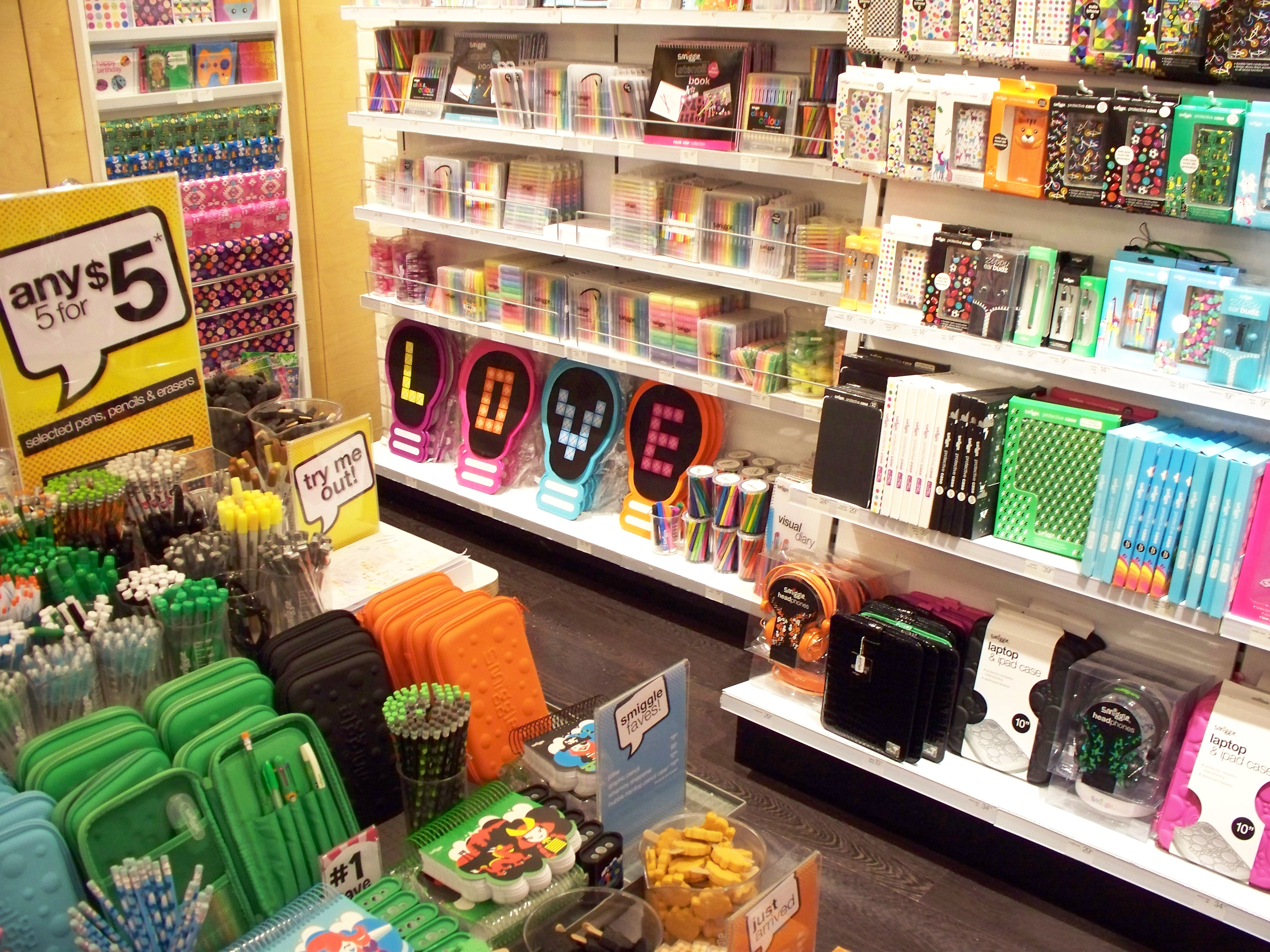
A selection of Smiggle products

Smiggle is known for its innovative design and use of colour. It has been credited with filling a gap in the Australian stationery market for "fashion-forward, bold stationery". Products from Smiggle come in various bright colours which are generally targeted at children and other young demographics. The brand features five key colour areas - purple, blue, pink, green, white, black and the newly introduced colour, orange. But some products can deviate from this, containing a wide variety of colours, and stocked away from the store's bloc-colour arrangements.

Smiggle's website and stores mainly focus on selling stationery, with other categories including; bags, wallets, and other travel accessories; food and drink containers; hard and soft pencil cases; various watches, slap bands, bracelets, necklaces, lanyards, and badges; novelty games, various toys and party accessories; speaker cases and speakers, computer tablet, laptop and mobile phone cases, headphones, alarm clocks, and booklights; diaries; and various gift packs. In the past, the chain has also sold other items such as USBs and USB hubs - the latter of which are shaped as octopuses or dinosaurs - and luna lights.

For Smiggle's tenth birthday in February 2013, they commenced selling a Limited Edition Birthday range, highlighting favourite designs from the preceding ten years. John Cheston, General Manager of Smiggle said, "Looking back over the last ten years, we have chosen our fans' most popular items and recreated them in an array of bold colours. Also, to celebrate our birthday, we thought it was only fitting to create a limited range of party products for our fans to enjoy, so they can celebrate with us."
