= Jeanswest =

Australian clothing retailer

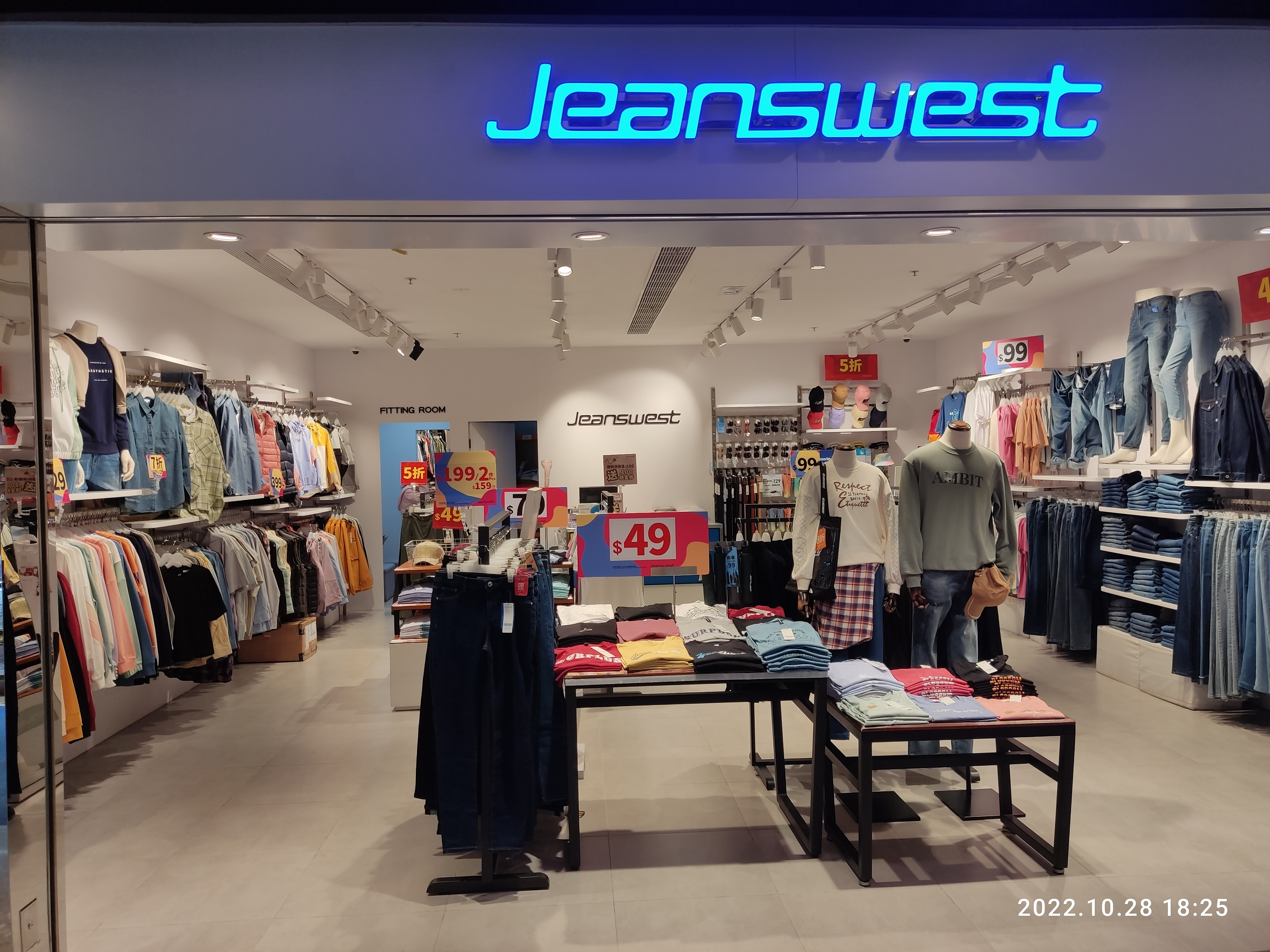
- Jeanswest store at the OP Mall in Hong Kong
- Type: Private
- Industry: Retail
- Founded: 1972; 54 years ago in Perth, Western Australia
- Founder: Alister Norwood
- Headquarters: Hawthorn, Victoria, Australia
- Number of locations: 90
- Area served: Australia (not active); Iran; United Arab Emirates; Russia; Indonesia; Nepal; China; Malaysia; Thailand; Singapore; Philippines; Mongolia; New Zealand
- Key people: Mark Daynes (CEO)
- Owner: Harbour Guidance Pty Ltd
- Website: jeanswest.com.au

Jeanswest (formerly stylised JeansWest) is an Australian apparel online store, owned by Hong Kong company Harbour Guidance Pty Ltd. It operates in the market of casual wear and lifestyle, with denim playing an integral part in the product range. Its main rivals are Just Jeans and Jay Jays which stock a similar range of clothing and denim.

Originally a chain of up to 146 physical stores, Jeanswest entered voluntary administration in Australia on 15 January 2020. On 25 February 2020 it was announced that the chain would be bought by Hong Kong based Harbour Guidance Pty Ltd.

In March 2025, it was announced that the company would again be going into administration, and eventually it closed all of its remaining 90 stores, however it maintains an online presence.

== History ==
Jeanswest opened its first store headed by Alister Norwood in Perth, Western Australia in 1972. By 1984, there were 28 stores across Western Australia.

In 1985, Jeanswest branched into Queensland, buying the Eagle Jeans chain of stores, followed by New South Wales in 1987 and Victoria in 1992. In 1990 Norwood relinquished control of JeansWest to Peter Volk and Glorious Sun Group. The company's headquarters was moved from Perth to Melbourne.

Jeanswest entered voluntary administration in Australia as of 15 January 2020, leaving the future of its 146 Australian stores and the employment of its almost-1000 staff in doubt. It was announced on 25 February 2020 that the chain would be bought by Hong Kong based Harbour Guidance Pty Ltd, in a deal that was meant to save 106 of the affected Australian stores, meaning 40 stores would remain closed and their 308 staff members offered redundancies.

On 25 March 2025, administrators from Pitcher Partners announced that the brand and its 90-plus stores in Australia would close, with the loss of hundreds of jobs. Jeanswest's New Zealand stores were not affected.

Later, the online store shut down and was reduced to a banner to a store locator whilst running out on stock and inventory, citing "overwhelming demand".

In July, Harbour Guidance reacquired the brand in a deed of company arrangement, though it only sought unsecured creditors owing $13 million receive 2c/$.

In January, it received criticism for using AI-generated advertisements to promote its products on social media. It occasionally culminated in artifacts such as twins, prompts in audio, and an Uluru-Sydney Opera House.
