= Solomon Lew =

Australian businessman (born 1945)

- Born: 22 March 1945 (age 81); Brunswick, Melbourne, Australia
- Education: Mount Scopus Memorial College
- Occupations: Businessman; Chairman of Premier Investments
- Years active: 1963−present
- Spouse: Rose Lew AM (separated)
- Children: Peter Lew (son); Jacqueline Lew (daughter); Steven Lew (son)
- Website: solomonlew.com.au

Solomon Lew (born 22 March 1945) is an Australian businessman. His principal commercial activities involve importing apparel, toys and other goods into Australia from China and investments, mainly in retail companies.

As a teenager, Lew supplied dresses to the Myer Emporium in Melbourne using his company Voyager Solo. In 2014 Lew built a ten per cent stake in David Jones after South African retailer Woolworths launched a takeover bid for the department store. Lew was formerly a director then chairman of Coles Myer until voted out by shareholders. He was also involved in an attempt to resurrect Ansett with Lindsay Fox following its collapse in September 2001. In 2008 he returned to the board of his public company, Premier Investments, and became its chairman.

In 2016 he became the first Australian to be inducted into the World Retail Hall of Fame, which recognises the lifetime achievements of retail "legends".

== Early life ==
Lew was born in Melbourne to Esther (née Windman) and Pinkus Lew (originally Lewkowicz), Polish Jews from Częstochowa who immigrated to Australia during the Interwar period. His father was active in Melbourne's Jewish community and was vice-president of a landsmanshaft for Częstochowa Jews. Pinkus Lew established a textiles business in Flinders Lane, but died when his son was 12 years old.

Lew was educated at Mount Scopus Memorial College. He established his first business, Voyager Solo, at the age of 18. He studied accounting and commerce at night school.

== Business career ==
In 1981, Lew's family office Parfit Investments Pty Ltd made a takeover bid for John Martin's, an Adelaide based department store chain. The following year, another of Lew's firms Specular Investments Pty Ltd made an unsuccessful bid for eyewear retailer OPSM.

By 1983 Lew and controlled entities had obtained close to a 10 percent stake in Myer Emporium Ltd. In the same year he proposed a A$50 million takeover bid for the Australian branch of Cadbury Schweppes.

=== Yannon transaction ===
While chairman of Coles Myer, Lew involved Coles Myer in a deal with a private company Yannon Pty Ltd which ultimately lost Coles Myer A$18 million. An internal Coles investigation endorsed Lew's claim that he knew nothing of the deal, and a subsequent four-year investigation by the Australian Securities & Investments Commission (ASIC) ended with no charges being pursued.

ASIC chairman Alan Cameron, acknowledged during the press conference to announce the outcome of the investigation that: "It is worth saying that the original loss suffered by Coles Myer was about A$18 million, and the recovery made by Coles Myer was in excess of A$12 million." Lew contributed to this 1996 settlement with Coles-Myer. Cameron also said that it was "clearly true" that Lew was not guilty of any breaches of the law. When asked if he believed Lew was innocent, Cameron replied: "of course."

ABC Radio's PM program described the transaction:

"The Yannon deal was an undisclosed indemnity given by Coles-Myer to a shelf company called Yannon set up by CS First Boston. It bought shares in a company called Premier, a major shareholder in Coles-Myer controlled by then Executive Chair of Coles, Solomon Lew. It guaranteed Yannon against any losses in the share deal, eventually costing Coles $18 million. Coles retrieved $12 million in a later agreement between itself, Mr Lew and with other parties. The funding of the buying of its own shares, the apparent involvement of the chairman and the lack of disclosure raised serious governance issues for Coles-Myer, and ended with the replacement of almost the entire board of directors and the withdrawal of significant shareholder support."

When Coles Myer's chief financial officer, Philip Bowman, resigned and revealed the details of the transaction it brought a great deal of unwanted public attention to Lew. Bowman's revelations prompted an investigation into whether the Yannon transaction broke the Corporations Law or other laws that lasted five years and gathered a quarter of a million pages of documents and twelve thousand pages of evidence. The ASIC recommended criminal prosecution against Lew in its brief, although the Commonwealth Director of Public Prosecutions, who had the final decision, decided not to proceed with criminal charges against Lew, Lew's advisers, or those working within Coles Myer. The Chairman of ASIC told the ABC:

"I think where the community would have had concern is if the community had felt that a transaction was beyond investigation in some way. This transaction was not beyond investigation."

=== The Etiket transaction ===
Another controversial business transaction involving Lew related to a single purpose trust called Etiket. The beneficiaries were Lew's family. The trust was used to acquire 2% of Coles Myer in 1989, at a time of high interest rates. Lew offered competing explanations for what happened next. But the end result was that the Coles Myer shares were assigned to Premier Investments for an A$8 million profit. A Queen's Counsel who investigated the transaction said:

Well, he very simply bought them for $8.20. There was no substantial movement of the share price, but he sold them to Premier for $9.00. He made 80 cents a share, or $8 million, in four weeks.

=== TESNA ===
Lew and Lindsay Fox formed a consortium to acquire Ansett Airlines after it had an administrator appointed. They sought and obtained the exclusive right to negotiate to purchase the airline. They obtained the agreement of various stakeholders in the airline, including trade union members and their representatives. Greg Combet, the secretary of the Australian Council of Trade Unions said Lew had breached 'repeated commitments'. During this time spent negotiating, the administrators had been persuaded to continue to operate the airline despite heavy losses which reduced the amount ultimately available to creditors, which included employees owed entitlements. Lew and Fox had committed to take on A$183 million of these entitlement obligations if they acquired the company. These commitments and their statements that they could and would proceed with the acquisition led the trade unions with members involved in the business to support the bid. The consequence of Lew's withdrawal was much embarrassment for the ACTU, which had strongly supported the Lew-Fox bid.

=== Coles Myer board ===
In September 2002, a resolution to remove Lew from the Board of Coles Myer was successful after Stan Wallis, the chairman of the company, campaigned for Lew's removal. Wallis successfully lobbied major institutional shareholders, including insurance companies, banks and large investment firms to take the rare action of voting against an incumbent director. Prior to the vote, Lew campaigned heavily spending an estimated A$10 million campaigning for his re-election focusing mainly on smaller shareholders. He was successful in obtaining millions of proxies but they were ultimately insufficient.

=== Premier Investments, Just Group and Myer deal ===
In March 2008, Lew returned to the public company stage, rejoining the board of the listed company Premier Investments, as its chairman. At the same time, Premier announced a takeover offer for Just Group, one of Australia's largest retailers which owns Just Jeans, Portmans, Dotti, Peter Alexander Sleepwear, Jay Jays, Smiggle and Jacqui E. Analysts criticised the offer for being too low and comprising less than half in cash. In publicly explaining his offer, Lew said Just Group was trading worse than had been disclosed to the investment community.

Premier's stationery brand Smiggle was profitable in its first year in the United Kingdom after launching in 2015. The brand was subsequently launched in Hong Kong and Malaysia in 2016. Smiggle's first global flagship store was opened on London's Oxford Street in 2018, along with the first concession outlet in department store Selfridges.

Premier Investments owns a 31 per cent stake in Myer. It also holds a 25.5 per cent stake in appliance maker Breville worth $970.5 million.

In late October 2024, Premier and Myer announced they had reached a deal for Myer to buy Premier's Apparel Brands division (comprising the fashion brands Just Jeans, Jay Jays, Jacqui E, Portmans and Dotti). As part of the transaction, Myer will issue new shares (worth $863.78 million) to Premier Investments, while Premier will contribute $82 million to the business. Lew will join the Myer board as a non-executive director and the deal would make him Myer's largest shareholder with a personal stake of 26.8 per cent. The deal was completed in January 2025.

=== Myer board ===
Lew was appointed as a non-executive director to the board of Myer in September 2026. Mark Middeldorf serves as Lew's alternate director.

== Personal life ==
In 2014 Lew separated from Rosie Lew AM, his wife of forty years. Their three children are active in the Lew's business empire including Peter, who is the chairman of P Lew Investment Group and the owner of the BrandBank Group of Companies. He is married to Ally Lew and has three children; Steven, who married Sarah Nowoweiski in 2003 and filed for divorce in 2011. They have two children; and Jacqueline, who married Adam Priester in 1999 and filed for divorce in 2011. They have four children.

Lew is Jewish and is a member of the Chabad House synagogue in Malvern, Victoria. He was active in the United Israel Appeal from the late 1960s and in the early 1980s founded its Action for Israel division.

In 1986, Lew donated $450,000 to the National Gallery of Victoria to fund the acquisition of Glenara, a painting by Eugene von Guerard.

In 1999, each of his children were gifted A$170 million from the "Lew Custodian Trust".

=== Net worth ===
As of May 2025, Lew's net worth was assessed by the Australian Financial Review as A$4.11 billion, published in the 2025 Rich List. As of May 2025, Lew was one of seven living Australians who have appeared in every Financial Review Rich List, or its predecessor, the BRW Rich 200, since it was first published in 1984.

In January 2019 his net worth was estimated by Forbes Asia as US$1.46 billion as published in the list of Australia's 50 richest people; and Lew was ranked 33rd on The Australian's Richest 250 List.

Year	Financial Review Rich List		Forbes Australia's 50 richest	
Year	Rank	Net worth A$	Rank	Net worth US$
2014				
2015				
2016				
2017	19	$2.38 billion ▲		
2018	23 ▼	$2.55 billion ▲		
2019	24 ▼	$2.83 billion ▲	28	$1.46 billion ▲
2020	24	$3.72 billion ▲		
2021	23 ▲	$4.37 billion ▲		
2022	25 ▼	$4.20 billion ▼		
2023	25	$3.97 billion ▼		
2024	24 ▲	$4.72 billion ▲		
2025	37 ▼	$4.11 billion ▼		

Legend
Icon	Description
Steady	Has not changed from the previous year
▲	Has increased from the previous year
▼	Has decreased from the previous year

== See also ==
- Brian Quinn
