= Myer =

Australian department store chain

Myer Holdings Limited

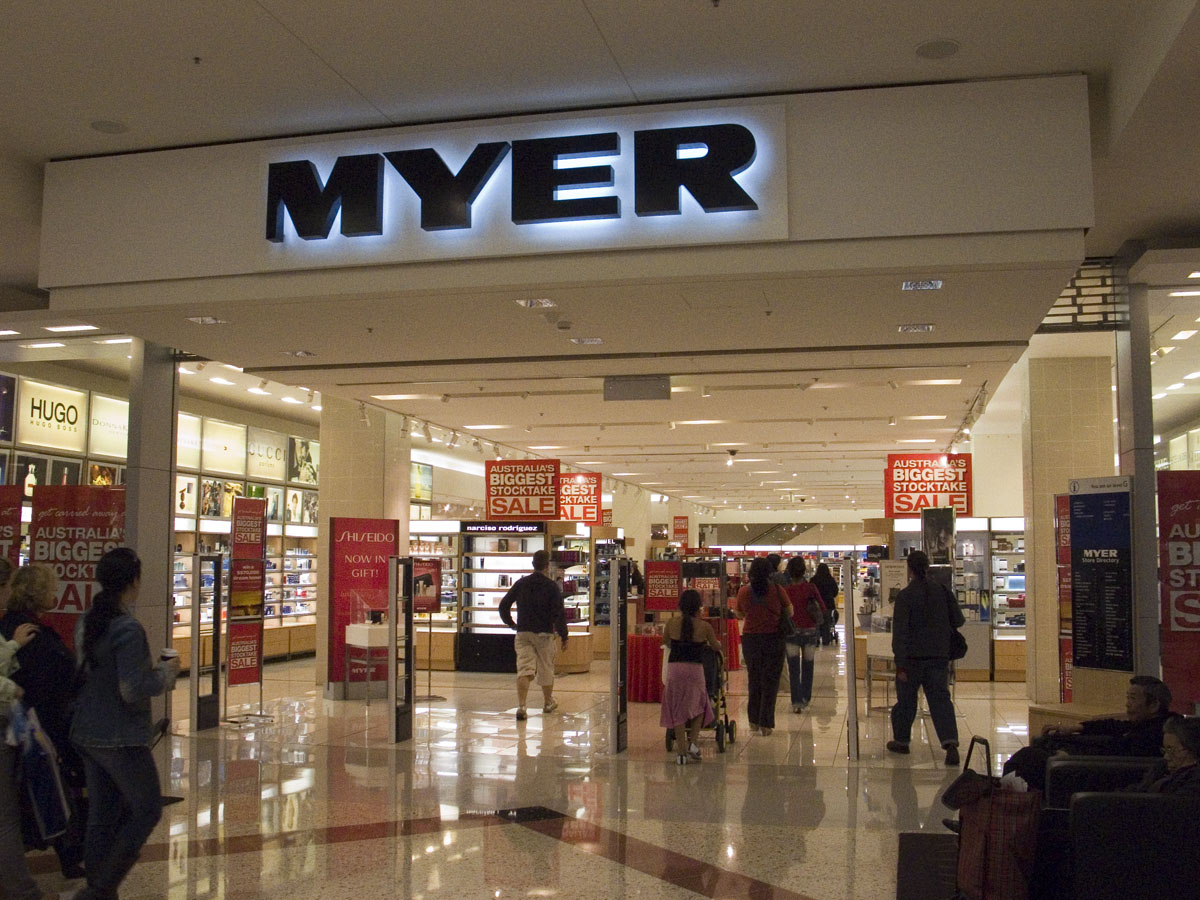
- Type: Public company
- Traded as: ASX: MYR
- Industry: Retail
- Founded: 1 November 1900; 126 years ago, Melbourne, Australia
- Founder: Sidney Myer
- Headquarters: 1000 La Trobe Street Docklands, Victoria, Australia
- Number of locations: 57 (2023)
- Key people: Olivia Wirth (CEO and chair); Elyse Knowles (Ambassador); Kris Smith (Ambassador)
- Products: Womenswear, Menswear, Beauty, Homewares, Electrical, Toys, and General Merchandise
- Brands: Sass & Bide; Marcs; David Lawrence; Just Jeans; Jay Jays; Jacqui E; Portmans; Dotti
- Revenue: ▲ A$2.989 billion (2022)
- Operating income: ▲ A$184.2 million (2022)
- Net income: ▲ A$60.2 million (2022) (excluding implementation costs)
- Number of employees: 14,000+
- Website: myer.com.au

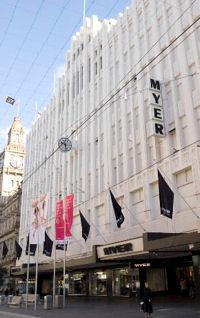
Myer's national flagship store in Melbourne's Bourke Street Mall

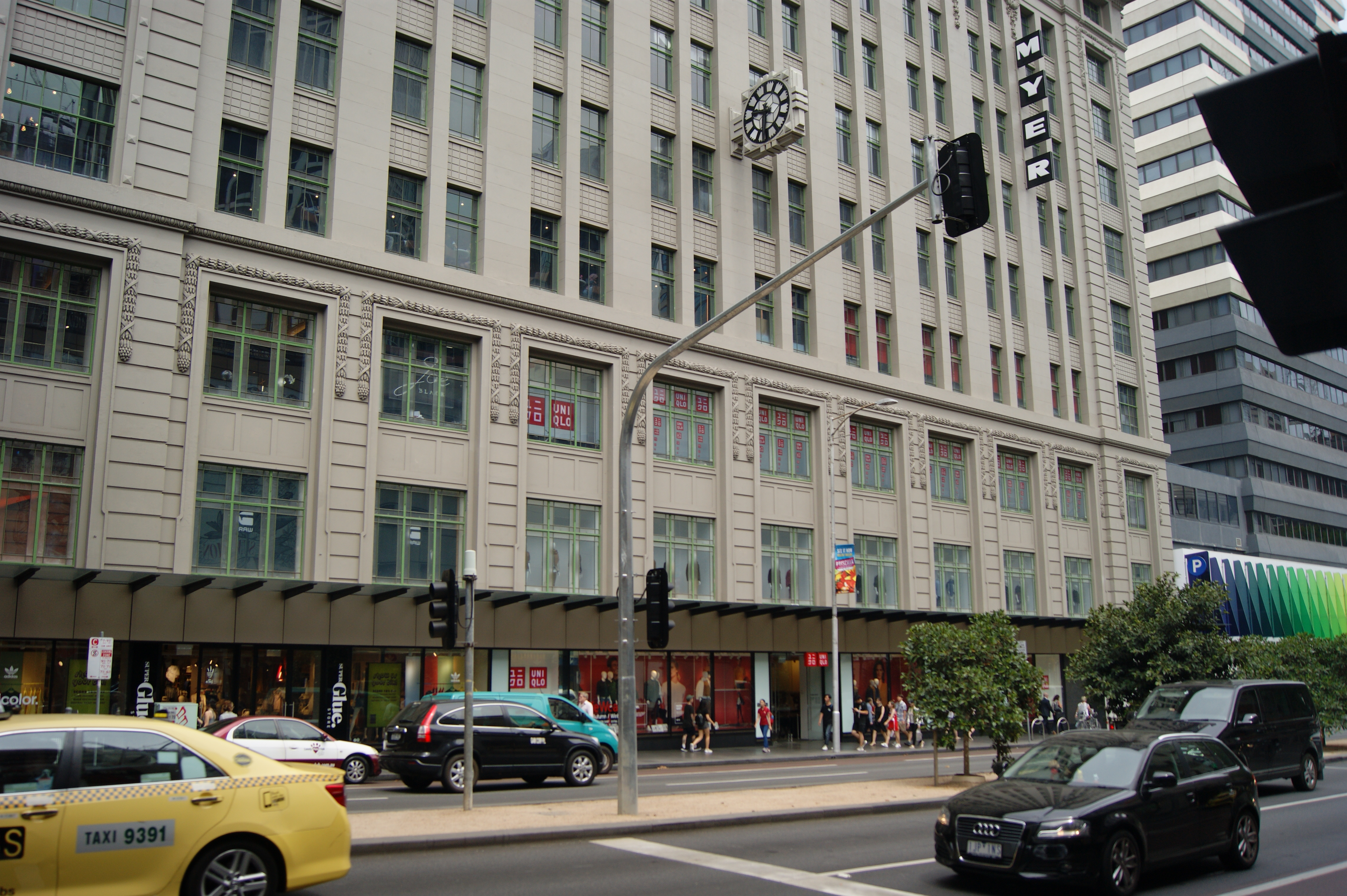
Myer Emporium on Lonsdale Street in the Melbourne central business district

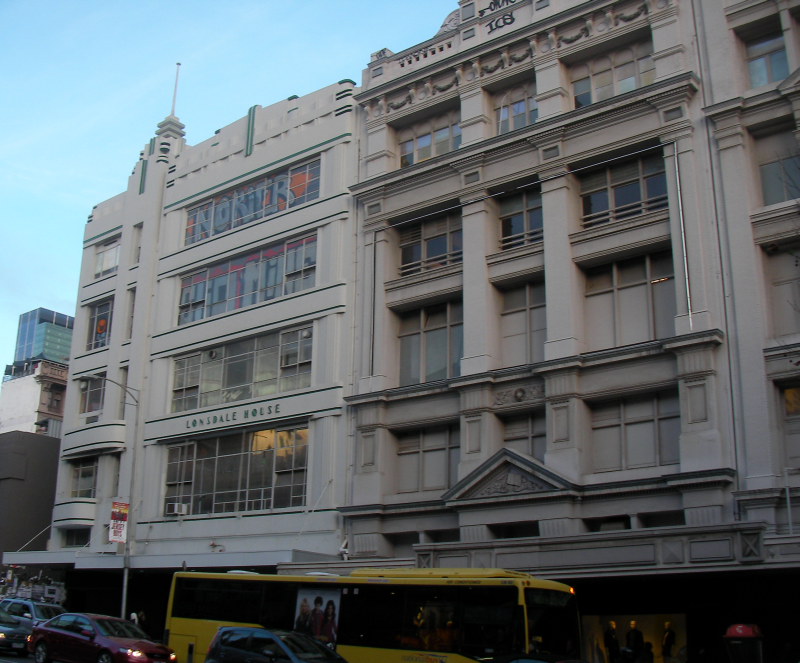
Myer Lonsdale Street, including Lonsdale House (former head office building until 1980s & again between 2006 and 2010). Built in 1934, Myer successfully applied to demolish Lonsdale House in 2009 to widen Caledonian Lane for delivery trucks despite the buildings being in a City of Melbourne Heritage Overlay, retaining just the facades of two Victorian buildings.

Myer (stylised MYER) is an Australian mid-range to upscale department store. It trades in all Australian states and one of Australia's two self-governing territories. Myer retails a broad range of products across women's, men's, and children's clothing, as well as footwear and accessories, cosmetics and fragrance, homewares, electrical, connected home, furniture, toys, books and stationery, food and confectionery, and travel goods.

Myer's primary department store rival is David Jones. The Myer Group also comprises the fashion brands Sass & Bide, Marcs, David Lawrence, Just Jeans, Jay Jays, Jacqui E, Portmans and Dotti.

Australian model, and Miss Universe 2004, Jennifer Hawkins was the long-serving 'face of Myer' for 12 years, until her departure from the role in 2018.

== History ==
=== Early history ===
The Myer retail group was founded by Sidney Myer, who migrated from Belarus to Melbourne in 1899 after the height of Victoria's gold rush, with very little money and little knowledge of English to join his elder brother, Elcon Myer (1875–1938), who had left Russia two years earlier. They opened the first Myer store in Bendigo on 1 November 1900. After prospering, they opened a second store in Bendigo in 1908.

In 1911, Myer purchased the business of Wright and Neil, Drapers, in Bourke Street, Melbourne, near the General Post Office, and a new building was completed and opened in 1914. From this base, Myer built Australia's largest chain of department stores, and the only chain with stores in all Australian states.

In 1918, the Doveton woollen mills at Ballarat were purchased, and in 1921 a new building fronting Post Office Place was added at Melbourne and in the following years Myer purchased adjoining properties, eventually building a store known as the Myer Emporium. The 1914 building had been designed by architects HW & FB Tompkins, who went on to design all the extensions over the next 20 years. The Myer store expanded to Lonsdale Street in the 1920s, and the Bourke Street frontage was expanded and rebuilt in 1933.

The Myer Emporium grew with the purchase of the old established businesses of Robertson & Moffat and Stephens & Sons. In Adelaide, in 1925, the company Myer SA Stores Ltd acquired a controlling interest in Marshall's department store and its shares continued to be listed on the Adelaide Stock Exchange until Myer Emporium Ltd made a successful takeover bid in 1966. A separate building in Queensberry Street, Melbourne, was put up in 1928, it was called Carlton Despatch, Myer had a large number of trucks that delivered items to the suburbs of Melbourne. People phoned the department that sold what they wanted. It was then sent to Carlton Despatch and delivered to peoples homes. They paid with a Myer Card, that put the amount on their account, that was sent to customers monthly. The Collins Street businesses of T. Webb and Sons, china importers, and W. H. Rocke and Company, house furnishers, were bought and transferred to the Bourke Street building. By 1934, the public company had a paid-up capital of nearly £2.5 million.

On the death of Sidney Myer in 1934, leadership of the company fell to briefly to Lee Neil, who died a few months later, and thence to Elcon Myer. On the death of Elcon in 1938, leadership went to their nephew Norman Myer. Norman Myer led the company until his death in 1956.

Myer grew by developing its own stores (becoming one of Australia's major property owners and developers in the process) and acquiring other department stores, including Adelaide's Marshall's and Bell's (Victor Harbor, Mount Barker, Murray Bridge, Strathalbyn and Tailem Bend) in South Australia, Western Australia's Boans in 1984, Queensland's Barry & Roberts as well as McWhirters of Brisbane's Fortitude Valley in 1955 and Allan & Stark in 1959, in Victoria Paterson Powell Pty Ltd (Ballarat) in 1953, Morris Jacobs (Geelong) in 1950, Bilson's (Colac) and Shilliday's (Mildura), and in New South Wales they acquired Western Stores, McLean's Central Stores (Lismore), Morley's (Tweed Heads), Farmers & Co in 1961, Mortimer's (Gosford) in 1968, P.G.Smith & Regans (Tamworth) in 1953 and Grace Bros in 1983.

=== Target and Grace Bros ===
In 1968, Myer acquired Lindsay's stores in Geelong, renaming the business Target, positioning it as a discount department store chain.

The core business of the company began to expand even further with the purchase of liquor retailers (San Remo and Crittendens) and fast food outlets (Red Rooster).

In 1983, Grace Bros bought Myer in New South Wales, and then in July of that year Myer acquired Grace Bros Holdings Ltd. The Myer store on Market and Pitt Streets in Sydney became the main Grace Bros store.

In 1984, Myer acquired Boans, the dominant Western Australian department store chain and embarked on a major redevelopment of its Perth City Store.

=== Merger with GJ Coles ===
In 1985 the Myer Emporium (and Target, its discount department store) merged with GJ Coles & Coy forming Coles Myer, then Australia's largest retailer. Myer remained a distinct entity within the new corporate structure until it was sold in 2006.

In 2000, Coles Myer CEO Dennis Eck, faced with lower sales and profits from Myer and Grace Bros stores took the department stores down market, reducing service levels, increasing stock volumes on the selling floor and introducing product to appeal to younger consumers. In doing so, he ended up replicating the approach of another of Coles Myer's chains, Target. The resulting effect included reduced customer visits and reduced units sold per transaction. In 2001, Coles Myer set about to reposition the store to appeal to customers lost in the down market experiment.

In 2003, one of the key changes made by the recently appointed Managing Director, Dawn Robertson, was to classify each Myer Grace Bros store using a grid system referencing the socio-economic status of the area, its turnover and growth potential. Larger city-centre stores would rank at the top of the grid and smaller regional stores would rank at the bottom of the grid. The grid would affect the merchandise allocated to each store, rather than selling the same range of product in downtown Melbourne as in regional Queensland.

On 13 February 2004, Grace Bros stores were re-branded as Myer.

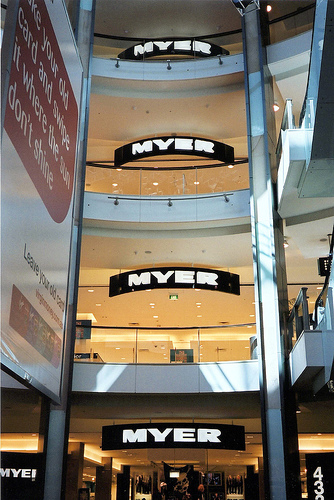
Myer Bondi previously as Grace Bros Bondi, as seen from Westfield Bondi Junction

In April 2004, Myer re-opened its Bondi Junction, store which replaced a former Grace Bros store closed in April 2002 to make way for the redevelopment of Westfield Bondi Junction. It was the first Myer store to open in several years and incorporated new features such as white glossy floor tiles, extensive use of glass, and greater use of mannequins.

Under managing director Dawn Robertson, Myer began to target the Sydney market more strongly, to challenge the position of chief rival David Jones particularly in ladies fashion. In February 2004, Myer held its Sydney fashion parade the day before David Jones. On 9 August 2004, Myer staged a fashion parade open-air in Martin Place, gaining widespread attention, and again it was held the day before David Jones' show.

=== Divestment by Coles Myer ===
On 17 August 2005, Coles Myer announced that within 12 months, it would decide to demerge, divest or retain Myer. Thirteen expressions of interest were made for all or part of Myer.

On 13 March 2006, Coles Myer announced it would sell Myer to a consortium controlled by US private equity group Newbridge Capital. The consortium also included the Myer family, who held a 5% stake. The new owners, who also secured the freehold on the flagship Bourke Street store, indicated that they would not radically change the business, at least in the short term, and had no plans to redevelop the Bourke Street site as this would impact too heavily on profitability during the construction period. Texas Pacific also had interests in UK department store Debenhams and high-end US retailer Neiman Marcus. This sale was completed for A$1.4 bn on 2 June 2006.

=== Private ownership ===
After being divested from Coles Myer (later Coles Group, then purchased by Wesfarmers), new owners Newbridge Capital and the Myer family appointed chairman Bill Wavish and chief executive Bernie Brookes, both formerly of Woolworths. Rupert Myer joined the board representing the Myer family. Head office for Myer, moved from Coles Myer head office in Hawthorn East back to Lonsdale House (Lonsdale Street store) in Melbourne's CBD.

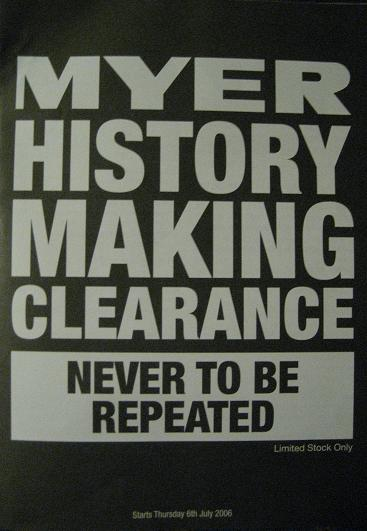
Flyer for the History Making Clearance distributed to customers.

Beginning July 2006, Myer held a "History Making Clearance" to clear out excess stock deemed either unprofitable or unpopular, and reduced inventories from $1.5 billion to $750 million, and all store-specific warehouses were closed.

Former Miss Universe Jennifer Hawkins began appearing in campaigns for Myer in 2006 and in January 2007 signed a $4 million deal to be the "face" of Myer for four years.

Myer withdrew from the Coles Group part-owned flybuys rewards program on 1 February 2007.

In March 2007, Myer announced first half earnings before interest and tax (EBIT) of $123 million, an increase of 84% on the previous year. This represents a profit margin of 6.8%, compared with 3.9% in the previous corresponding period. According to chairman Bill Wavish, all Myer stores were now profitable, and all stores were more profitable than in the previous year. Myer acquired four Harris Scarfe stores (including regaining a store it divested to Harris Scarfe in 1998) and took a minority shareholding in Harris Scarfe.

The Mymerch system, developed with IBM and Oracle, cost $99 million and was implemented early April 2007. Among other functions, Mymerch increased Myer's ability to carry out statistical analysis of customer habits giving it greater capacity to forecast sales trends and target promotions.

Myer's profit turnaround was tempered in April 2007 by the loss of key staff. Bob Boutin, apparel director, Mark Bingemann, women's wear business manager and Jasmine Bingemann, footwear and accessories manager all resigned within a short period. This followed reports of management dissatisfaction over the direction of the fashion business signified by the defection of designers such as Alex Perry and Tigerlily to David Jones.

In June 2007, a consortium comprising the Myer family, Colonial First State and GIC Real Estate (Singapore) announced it would be purchasing Myer's Melbourne CBD store. The Bourke Street part of the store was planned to be redeveloped by 2009, with Myer taking a 60-year lease, but the development was not completed until March 2011. The Lonsdale Street part of the store closed in 2009.

=== Public company ===
In September 2009, following rumours from the previous month, Myer indicated it would float the business at an indicative share price range of $3.90 to $4.90 when it listed on 2 November, giving it a market capitalisation between $2.3 billion and $2.8 billion. The final issue price was $4.10, but by August 2011 the shares had fallen to $2.09.

In 2010, Myer's re-developed Bourke Street mall store opened, becoming the company's new flagship store. Head office moved to a new site in Docklands. The historic Lonsdale Street store was officially closed.

In early 2011, Myer purchased a 65% stake in Australian women's fashion label Sass & Bide for A$42.25 million. In October 2013, Myer purchased the remaining 35% of the business for $30 million.

In January 2014, it was revealed by Fairfax Media that Myer had made a bid to purchase and merge with department store rival David Jones. The merger would have kept both chains operating independently on the surface, combining back-office and supply chain operations saving both companies an estimated $5 billion per year. The $3 billion non-binding indicative proposal was made to the David Jones board of directors in late October 2013, however was rejected by the board in November 2013. In February 2014, Myer reapproached David Jones, offering to purchase David Jones at market value (estimated to be 1.7 billion). David Jones had not yet commented on the new proposal, when food and clothing retailer, Woolworths South Africa offered to purchase David Jones, by way of a scheme implementation deed, in which shareholders of David Jones would be offered $4-per-share. In response to the Woolworths deal, Myer withdrew their proposal to David Jones. Myer's long serving CEO Bernie Brookes, whose strategy was to clean up the business and develop efficiency strategies, announced his departure in March 2015.

In September 2015, as part of an outcome from the 2015 strategic review, a $221mn capital raising was announced. The resulting dilution of shareholder value in conjunction with little support for the actions in the strategic plan saw the share price decline to $0.91.

In April 2017, Myer acquired two fashion brands—Marcs and David Lawrence—after they were placed in voluntary administration.

On 27 March 2020, Myer announced it would be temporarily closing down all of its stores from the close of business 29 March 2020 for a period of four weeks, standing down 10,000+ staff members, as a result of the COVID-19 pandemic. Myer continued to operate their online store, with no contact delivery available and click & collect at certain stores. Myer announced a plan to re-open all stores by 30 May 2020.

In June 2024, Olivia Wirth, became the company's executive chair. In late October 2024, Myer announced they had reached a deal to buy Premier Investments' Apparel Brands division (comprising the fashion brands Just Jeans, Jay Jays, Jacqui E, Portmans and Dotti). As part of the transaction, Myer issued new shares (worth $863.78 million) to Premier Investments, while Premier contributed $82 million to the business. Solomon Lew joined the Myer board as a non-executive director. The brands became part of Myer in January 2025 after the deal received shareholder approval.

== Stores and services ==
=== Myer One rewards program ===
The Myer One program was introduced in August 2004 after Coles Myer discontinued its shareholder discount card the previous month.

Myer revamped its Myer One program by introducing a graduated rewards system with four levels including Standard, Silver, Gold and Platinum. Each reward level is dependent on customer spend and confers exclusive benefits. The Platinum membership is by invitation only and is for Myer's highest spending customers and was added to the program in May 2013. The Myer One program was extended to Just Jeans, Portmans, Dotti, Jay Jays and Jacqui E in August 2025. From November 2025, Myer One members were able to earn points when shopping at Dan Murphy's, DoorDash, Pet Barn, MyCar and Lvly by linking their Visa or Mastercard. JD Sports was added as a partner in November 2025.

In September 2010, Myer stated there were 3.7 million members and five million cards in circulation. Of these, over 20,000 had Gold status, spending over $7,500 per annum. Sales attributed to members accounted for 68% of total Myer sales. Gift cards valued at $51 million had been provided to members as rewards in the previous year. As of February 2024, the Myer One program has more than 7 million members. As of October 2025, it had 4.7 million active members.

=== Myer store card and branded credit cards ===
Myer originally had a store card managed by Australian Retail Financial Network (ARFN), sold in 1995 to GE Money. This was superseded by a Coles Myer Card and Coles Myer Gift Card which could be used at all Coles Myer stores. This was augmented by the Coles Myer Source Mastercard, also managed by GE Money.

Following its sale, Myer relaunched the Myer card in October 2006 in conjunction with GE Money. According to GE Money, 125,000 accounts had been opened by August 2007.

In November 2007, Myer launched a Visa credit card, also in conjunction with GE Money. Myer stated it was prepared to wear losses from the card for two years and that its objective was to drive increased loyalty from the card (which links with the MYER one card) rather than being profitable in its own right. It expected to sign 100,000 customers to the Visa card by November 2008. Myer reported it had signed 15,000 customers to its Visa card in the first five weeks from launch, half of whom were converts from the existing store card.

In 2007, the Coles Myer Card, Coles Myer Gift Card and Coles Myer Source MasterCard were renamed Coles Group Card, Coles Group & Myer Gift Card and Coles Group Source MasterCard respectively and as such were no longer affiliated with Myer.

The Myer logo, featuring the "my store" slogan which is used from 2018–present

In 2017, Myer's partnership with GE Money (now Latitude Financial Services) ended, and Myer relaunched their store branded credit programme as the New Myer Credit Card, now offered by Macquarie Group. Existing card holders were invited to join the new programme, or have their existing Myer point earning cards converted to non-Myer point earning Latitude Finance cards.

=== Store locations ===
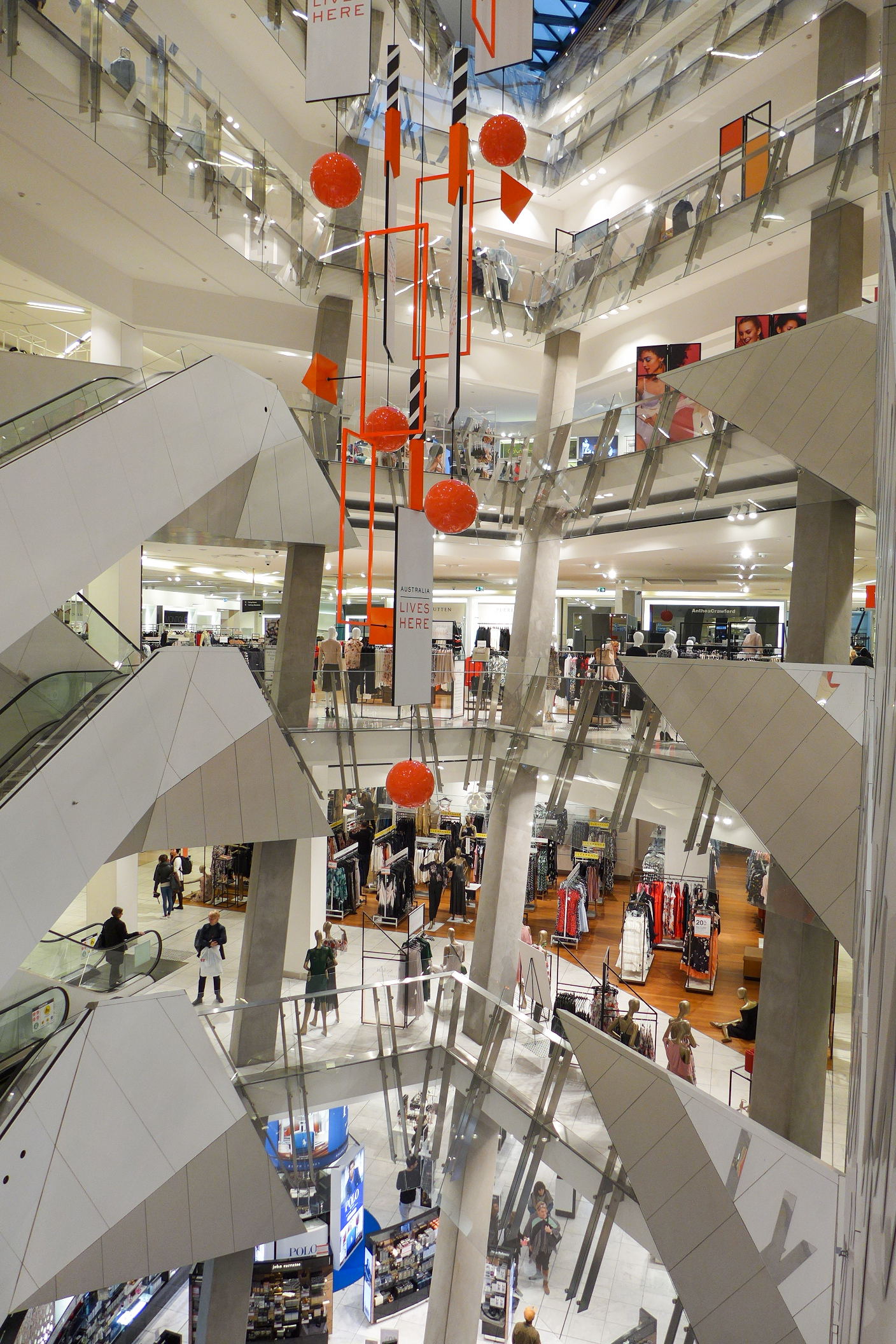
Myer Flagship Store in the Melbourne central business district

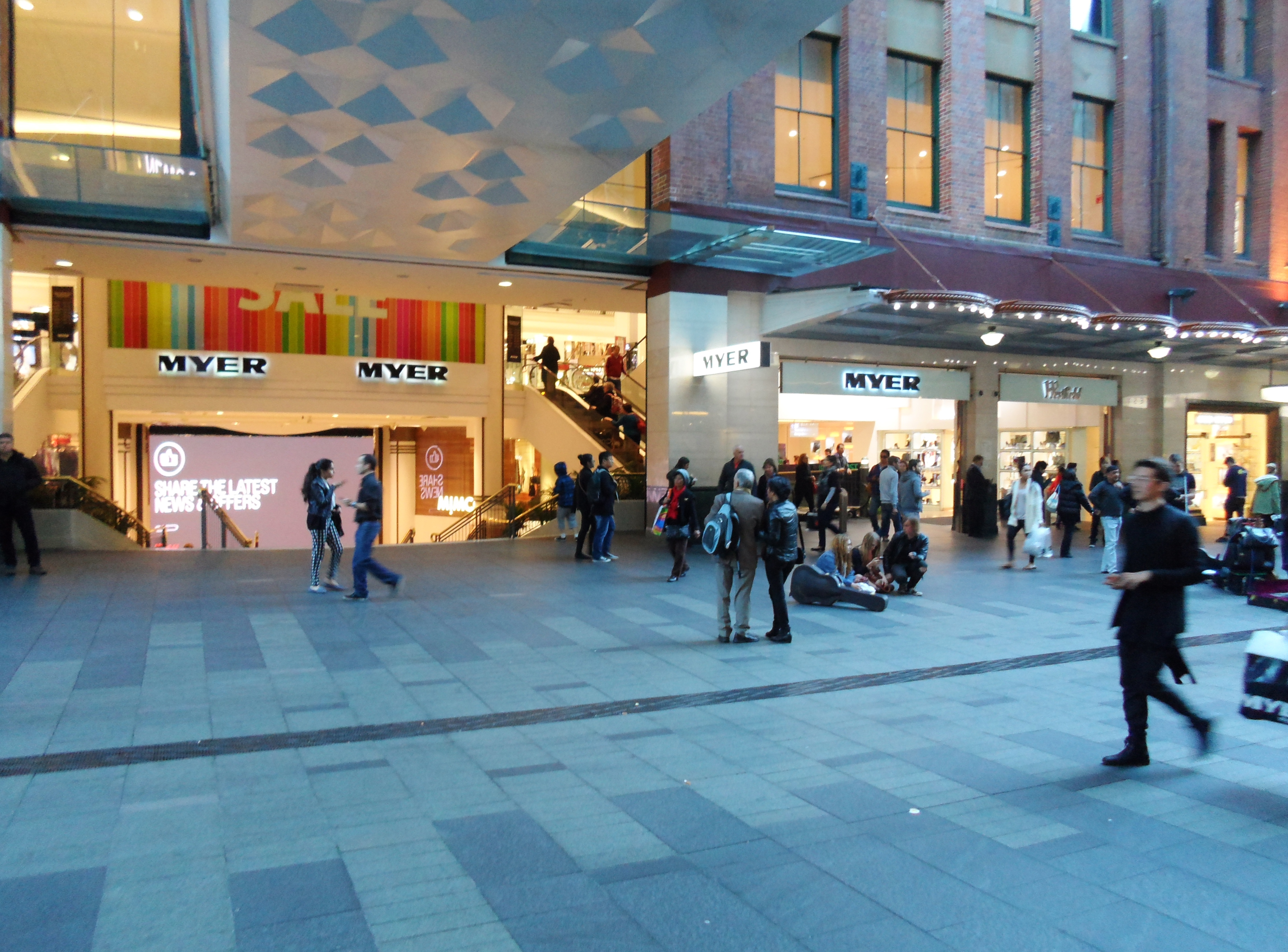
Myer Sydney central business district, Pitt Street entrance, formerly Grace Bros

As of April 2024, Myer has 56 stores across Australia, in both capital cities and regional centres.

The national flagship store is located in the Bourke Street Mall in Melbourne and received a $300 million redevelopment which officially opened in April 2011.

In 1988, the Myer Centre in Brisbane's Queen Street Mall opened in time for World Expo 88. The shopping centre featured six floors of stores. The top two levels featured an indoor amusement park, named Tops, with a swinging ship and Australia's first indoor roller coaster. The amusement park closed in the year 2000 and all the rides dismantled in preparation to convert the top two levels into a cinema complex.

In 1991, the Myer Centre opened in Adelaide housing the largest Myer store in South Australia and over 80 smaller shops, with an eight level atrium inside the shopping centre and six levels inside the Myer store. Until 1998, the top two levels of the atrium housed an indoor amusement park known as Dazzeland featuring Australia's only indoor rollercoaster.

In 1994, Myer opened a store at Galleria Shopping Centre (Perth). A retailer Boans was burnt during the 1980s and was replaced with Galleria.

In 2006, Myer announced the opening of several new stores, starting with four former Harris Scarfe stores (two in South Australia and two in Victoria). Further to this, in 2008 in Sydney, Myer opened two new stores in Sydney at Westfield Eastgardens and Bankstown Central replacing the former David Jones stores, while David Jones replaced the Myer store at Westfield Burwood, and stated it would open a store in suburban Townsville centre in early 2009. This project was delayed due to problems with the acquisition of land; however, in late October 2012 a Myer store opened in that centre.

In 2007, Chairman Bill Wavish stated Myer was willing to build new stores if necessary, and that new locations could be in any city or town with a population over 40,000 people.

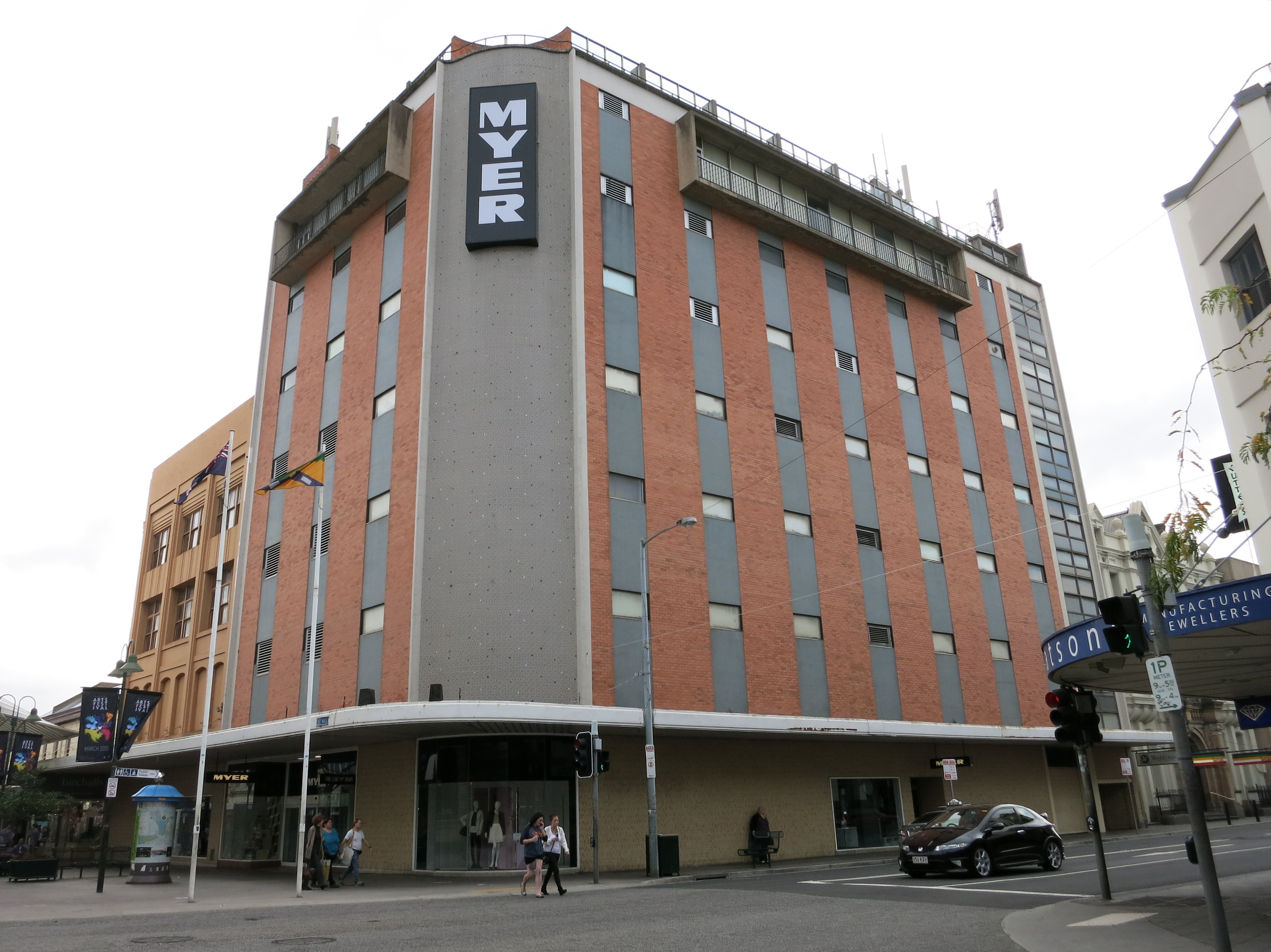
A Myer store located in Launceston's Brisbane Street Mall.

On 22 September 2007, Myer's Liverpool Street, Hobart building was destroyed by a fire that is believed to have started in the cosmetic section. Building damage was estimated at $50 million, and most stock was destroyed. The building including its historic façade was subsequently demolished. The adjacent Murray Street building suffered substantial smoke and water damage. Within a day of the fire, Myer issued a statement saying it would rebuild, and the Murray Street section of the store reopened on 16 November – 44 days after the fire. A new 8797 sq m, five-level Myer store finally reopened in November 2015.

Myer opened a store in the redeveloped Top Ryde City in northern Sydney in 2010. There was (previously an A.J. Benjamin's store) Grace Bros store at this centre from 1964 until closure in early 1985. The Myer store closed in July 2015.

In April 2008, Myer announced that it would open three new stores in Queensland. The first two stores were planned to open in 2010 at Westfield Mt Gravatt – Upper Mount Gravatt, Robina Town Centre with the third store planned to open in Mackay in 2011. Myer also announced that it would open a store at East Maitland in 2011 when the redevelopment was completed, later delayed until 2013.

In July 2008, Myer stated it planned to expand into the Middle East and open its first overseas store in Dubai, but by March 2009 had put such plans on hold.

In 2009, Myer stated it would open stores at Westfield Tuggerah on the New South Wales Central Coast, Westfield Woden in Canberra and Robina on the Gold Coast, Queensland, with plans for 12 stores in total to open progressively from 2010 to 2013. However, it subsequently pulled back on these plans.

In 2010, plans were put on the table and approved for a new subsequently-shelved 10,000sqm 2-level Myer store in Coffs Harbour, making it the first department store on the Mid North Coast of New South Wales. Had it been built, it would have been northern New South Wales’ own eco-friendly Myer department store beating short-listed favourites Tamworth (which previously had its own Grace Bros store until June 2003, prompting a strong Facebook campaign and petition to get one back in the first decade of the new millennium) and Port Macquarie as contenders to get a Myer store built and opened and operating in northern NSW. The “Vote Yes to Myer” online petition got 5,000 signatures for the proposed Coffs Harbour development.

In 2012, Myer also proposed a 12,000sqm 2 level full-line department store at Casuarina Square in Darwin, which would’ve been the first of its kind in the city and the Northern Territory. Due to open in 2016, the store was never built and Darwin remains the only state/territory capital without a Myer (or any other) department store in the country.

In January 2013, Myer closed its Kings Square, Fremantle store. Myer closed its Dandenong, Victoria store in October 2013, Elizabeth, South Australia store in February 2014 and it's store at Westfield Hurstville in January 2015. It opened a store at Lakeside Joondalup in November 2014.

Myer places stores into one of four clusters, which reflects the store specific shopper demographics. The cluster determines the merchandise mix, brand assortment, services offered, and capital expenditure. The sales performance expectations are also based on which cluster a store is placed. As of September 2015 the clusters (store numbers) were Flagship (7), Premium (16), Mainstream (27), and Community (17). At the time of the announcement it was stated ca. 20% of footprint rationalisation could occur.

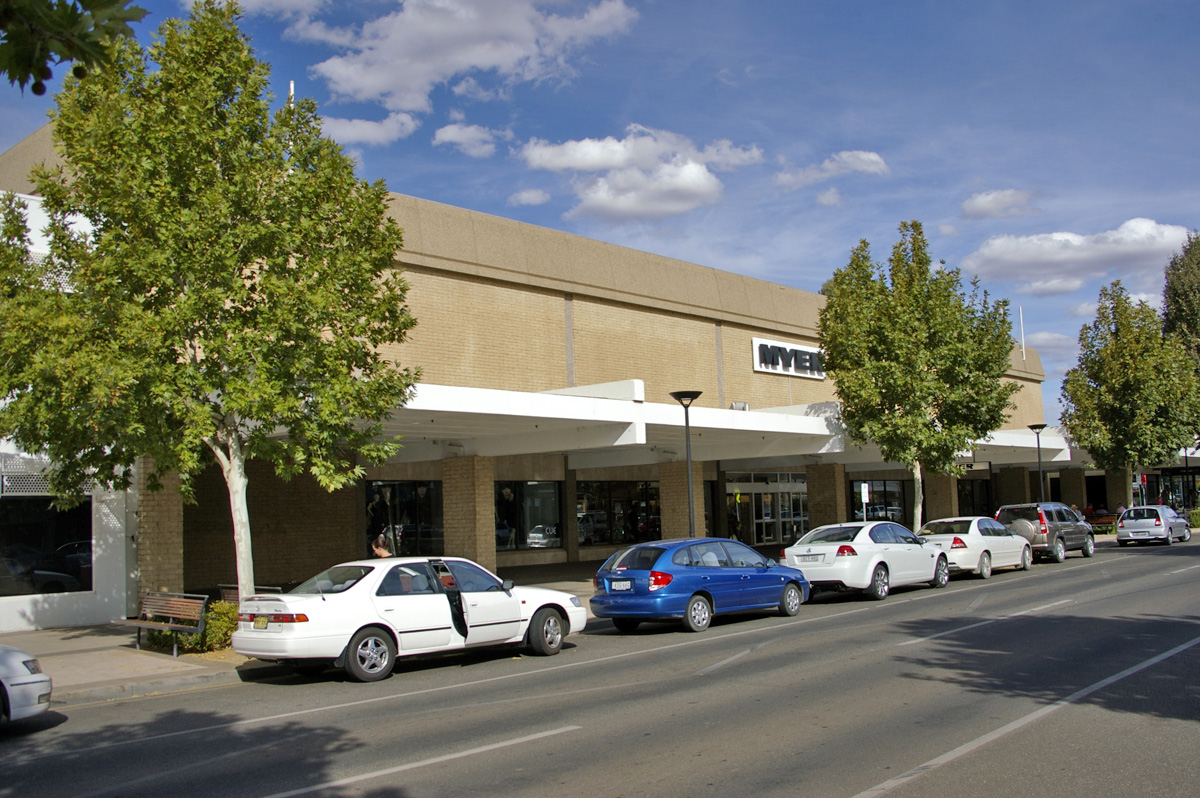
Myer Wagga Wagga, formerly Grace Bros pictured in 2008.

In 2017, Myer announced it would cut 20% of its overall footprint, via a reduction in floor space of its Myer stores, office and close other Myer stores. Since the announcement, Myer has closed its stores in Wollongong Central (Replaced by David Jones), Brookside Shopping Centre (Replaced by Target and TK Maxx), and Orange, which was one of Orange's main clothing shops for 60 years. Myer also announced the introduction of Clearance Floors, which was a format initially trialled at Myer Frankston. These floors used yellow signs with a coat hanger to show they were clearance floors, had minimal shelves and displays and were on the top floor of a Myer store. These floors would sell Myer’s unsold stock at a discounted price, essentially one space for all discounted items and a larger stock of discounted items. These floors were available at Frankston and Knox in Victoria, Loganholme and Pacific Fair in Queensland, Roselands and Penrith in New South Wales, Westfield Tea Tree Plaza in South Australia and Perth in Western Australia. These eight clearance floors ran from 2017 until 2019, intended to compete with the newly established international discount department store TK Maxx. Myer CEO John King announced a plan to discontinue the model in 2019, with a stronger focus on its premium offerings.

In September 2017, Myer stated it would close three more stores, Colonnades (Replaced by Cheap as Chips, Best & Less and JB Hi-Fi), Belconnen, and Hornsby.

In January 2019, Myer closed its Logan Hyperdome store in Loganholme, Queensland. This has resulted in five closures and two more planned closures in 2019.

On 13 January 2020, the Myer location at Hornsby, Sydney, closed, leaving 60 locations. The final store in the planned closures was Myer at Belconnen, although Myer has decided it shall instead spare the store and refurbish it instead. This concludes Myer’s strategy, resulting in 6 store closures and 60 Myer stores remaining, including Belconnen.

On 4 December 2020, Myer Belconnen reopened to two floors.

In March 2021, Myer announced its store at Westfield Knox, in Melbourne's eastern suburbs would close after 44 years of operation. Myer Knox closed for the last time in late July of that year.

In April 2022, the store at Westpoint Blacktown in Sydney's western suburbs closed after first opening in 1973.

In August 2022, Myer announced its Frankston store in bayside Melbourne would close permanently, with the last day of trading scheduled for 15 January 2023.

On 16 March 2023, Myer announced that, after being unable to reach a commercial agreement with the landlord, it would not be renewing its lease at the Brisbane Queen Street Mall location and seeking a new location in the CBD, thus ceasing 35 years of continuous operation at the site in July 2023. Griffith University emerged as a possible occupant of the site, albeit temporary, as the university required immediate expansion space whilst finding a more permanent CBD location. As of March 2023, the future of the site remains unclear, although the possibility of building demolition and site redevelopment has also been suggested.

=== Mail order and online shopping ===
Myer operated its own direct mail order company, Myer Direct, from 1989 until its sale to EziBuy in January 2002. In October 2007, Myer launched an online gift store, including electronic goods, perfumes, miss shop clothing and gift cards.

In 2011, Myer launched a Hong Kong based online shopping site called myfind.com (since closed) for Australian shoppers.

In December 2017, Myer launched The Myer Market, an online marketplace operating independently of myer.com.au. It offers an extended range of products, some of which are not traditionally available in Myer stores.

== See also ==
- List of oldest companies in Australia
