= Peter Alexander (fashion designer) =

Australian fashion designer (born 1965)

- Born: 1965 (age 60–61); South Africa
- Occupation: Fashion designer
- Years active: 1990s–present
- Employer: Peter Alexander
- Known for: Pyjamas, loungewear, giftware
- Title: Creative director

Peter Alexander (born 1965) is an Australian fashion designer known for the Peter Alexander brand of pyjamas, loungewear and giftware.

== Life and career ==
Peter Alexander was born in 1965 in South Africa and then moved to Melbourne, Australia shortly afterwards. He has two older sisters. Alexander attended boarding school at Geelong Grammar School for two years before returning home to Kew where he changed schools four times.

He worked from his mother's dining room table during the early days of the Peter Alexander brand. He initially sold directly to department stores. When a store cancelled an order for 2,000 pairs of pyjamas in 1990, he took out a mail order advertisement in Cleo magazine. Alexander received 6,000 orders from that one advertisement alone.

In 2000, Peter Alexander joined Australian retailer Just Group, effectively selling his business although remaining creative director within the structure of the Just Group. After the sale, the brand Peter's PJs increased in popularity and the first stand-alone store was opened in Melbourne Central Shopping Centre. The Just Group has since expanded its stores into every state of Australia.

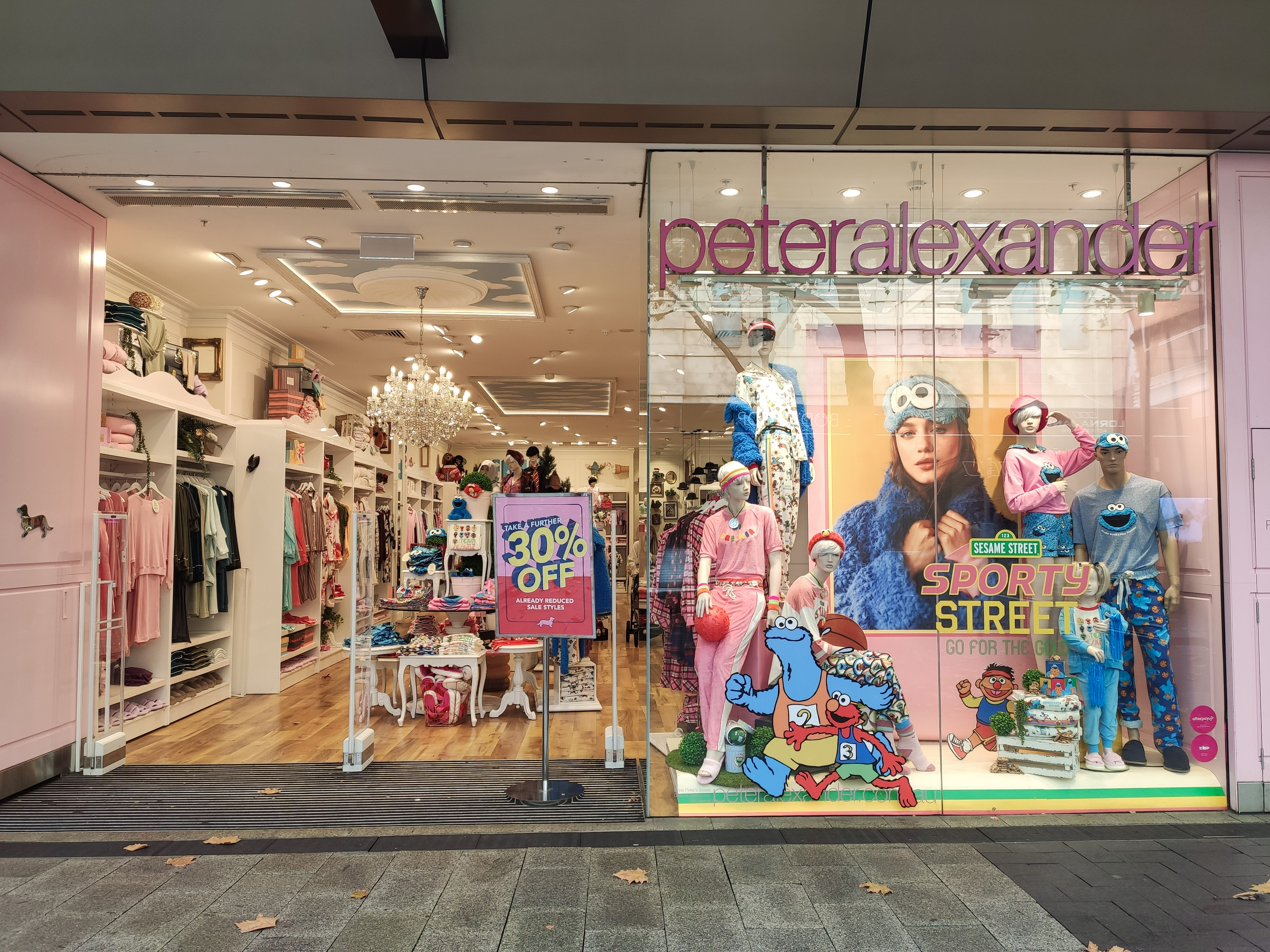
Peter Alexander store in the Perth CBD

Alexander also speaks at conferences around Australia and internationally on the topics of entrepreneurship and marketing. He is also a sessional lecturer in fashion marketing at RMIT.

Alexander lives in Melbourne. He is gay and Jewish.
