= Crittendens =

Australian grocery store and liquor outlet chain

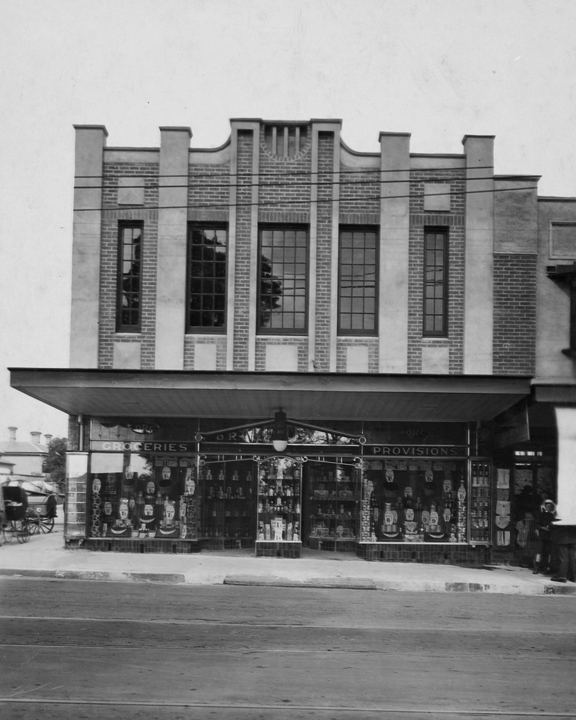
- Industry: Supermarket chain
- Founded: 1917; 109 years ago
- Founder: Oscar Crittenden
- Defunct: 1982; 44 years ago
- Fate: Acquired by Myer
- Headquarters: Melbourne, Australia
- Area served: South Eastern suburbs
- Products: Food & liquor
- Owner: Crittenden family

Crittendens’ was a chain of grocery stores and liquor outlets operating in Melbourne, Australia, in the 20th century. The first store opened in Malvern in 1917 and the firm went on to have a total of seven retail outlets, mostly in the affluent south-eastern suburbs. The business was bought out by Myer in 1982.

Some stores were then closed and others were opened, including three in Sydney, as the firm changed hands a number of times. At one stage members of the Crittenden family briefly (1989-1990) regained control of the business. One store, located in Toorak, still operated under the Crittenden name in 2023, but with no connection to the family.

== History ==
Oscar Rupert George Crittenden (1887-1954) was born in South Australia in 1887. The family came to Victoria soon after and settled on a farm near Lake Hindmarsh. In December 1891, Oscar's father, James, aged 33, died after being kicked by a horse, leaving a widow and four children.

The family moved to Melbourne in 1906. In that year Oscar became an employee of the Moorabbin Co-operative Society in the south-eastern suburbs of Melbourne. He remained in the store in Cheltenham till March 1912, when he left to work in a grocery store owned by David Kidd in Prahran.

In 1917, he borrowed £620 from his mother and used it to take over and stock a small grocery store at 138 Glenferrie Road, Malvern. The business then traded as O.R. Crittenden, grocer. The staff consisted of one man and a girl, and newspaper advertising state the store was "noted for good butter and eggs." By August 1930, the business employed 20 people, five of whom took telephone orders for groceries to be delivered in the firm's four vans. The store catered to the affluent suburbs of Malvern, Toorak and Armadale and carried imported gourmet foods not widely available elsewhere. Some commodities - such as coffee, dried fruit, butter and bacon - was bought in bulk and repackaged under the Crittenden brand.

In 1936 the business opened its second store, taking over an existing business at 569 Malvern Road, Toorak. In 1948, the business was registered as a company, O. R. Crittenden Ltd., grocers, with a capital of £25,000. The firm also began to retail fine wines and spirits in bottle-shops within the grocery stores during the 1930s. Crittendens employed 60 staff at the Malvern and Toorak stores, delivering to 4,000 homes a week by May 1954 when Oscar Crittenden died, aged 66, leaving a widow and four children.

The business was left to his two sons, John Maxwell (1921-2002) and Douglas Oscar (1923-2014), plus other long term employees of the company. The firm went on to have stores at Bay Street, Brighton, Warrigal Road, Ashwood, Upper Heidelberg Road, Ivanhoe, Bridge Road, Richmond and Lonsdale Street, Melbourne. The headquarters for the grocery side of the business was at the Malvern store, under the direction of Jack Crittenden, and included a warehouse behind the store. The liquor side of operations was supervised at the Toorak store by Doug Crittenden who had joined the business in 1946. The two other directors of the firm were Max Parsons (1920-2006) and accountant George Davies. The company came to do a considerable amount of bottling, buying hogsheads of wine direct from wineries in Victoria and South Australia, and retailing it under its own label. The company also published annual booklets for customers about the wine they sold. The firm also had a separate liquor wholesale operation by 1981. Wine and cheese tastings were hosted at particular stores, and events were held to mark the launch of new wine brands.

Crittendens became well known in the affluent suburbs of Melbourne. The wealthy and well connected ordered groceries and liquor on the telephone for home delivery and relied on the firm to cater parties and other special events. Customers included former Prime Minister Robert Menzies, businessman Sidney Myer and opera singer Dame Joan Hammond. Visitors to Melbourne also employed the services of Crittendens. American actor Gregory Peck lived in Toorak while filming the movie On the Beach (1959) and would place his order by phone. When the Queen mother came in 1958, Clarence House specified in advance her preferred brand of tea and champagne (Krug).

Crittendens was sold to department store chain Myer, in 1982, as part of the latter's plan to increase its core business. It closed down the bottling side of operations. Myer later sold Crittendens to supermarket chain Coles, which subsequently closed most of the stores. Woolworths purchased the Crittenden & Co brand name in 1987. By 2018, only the Toorak store still operated under the Crittenden name, and purely as a liquor outlet.

"Shopping at Crittendens" is the title, and subject, of a poem by Evan Jones that appeared in the Australian literary and cultural journal Quadrant in 1982.

Brett Crittenden, international wine educator and judge at wine shows, is a grandson of Oscar Crittenden.

The Crittenden Estate Winery, at Dromana, on Mornington Peninsula, south of Melbourne, owned and operated by Gary Crittenden, has no connection with Oscar Crittenden, his family or their business.
