= Western Stores =

Western Stores and Edgleys Ltd. was a group of department stores operating in Western and Central Western New South Wales in Australia.

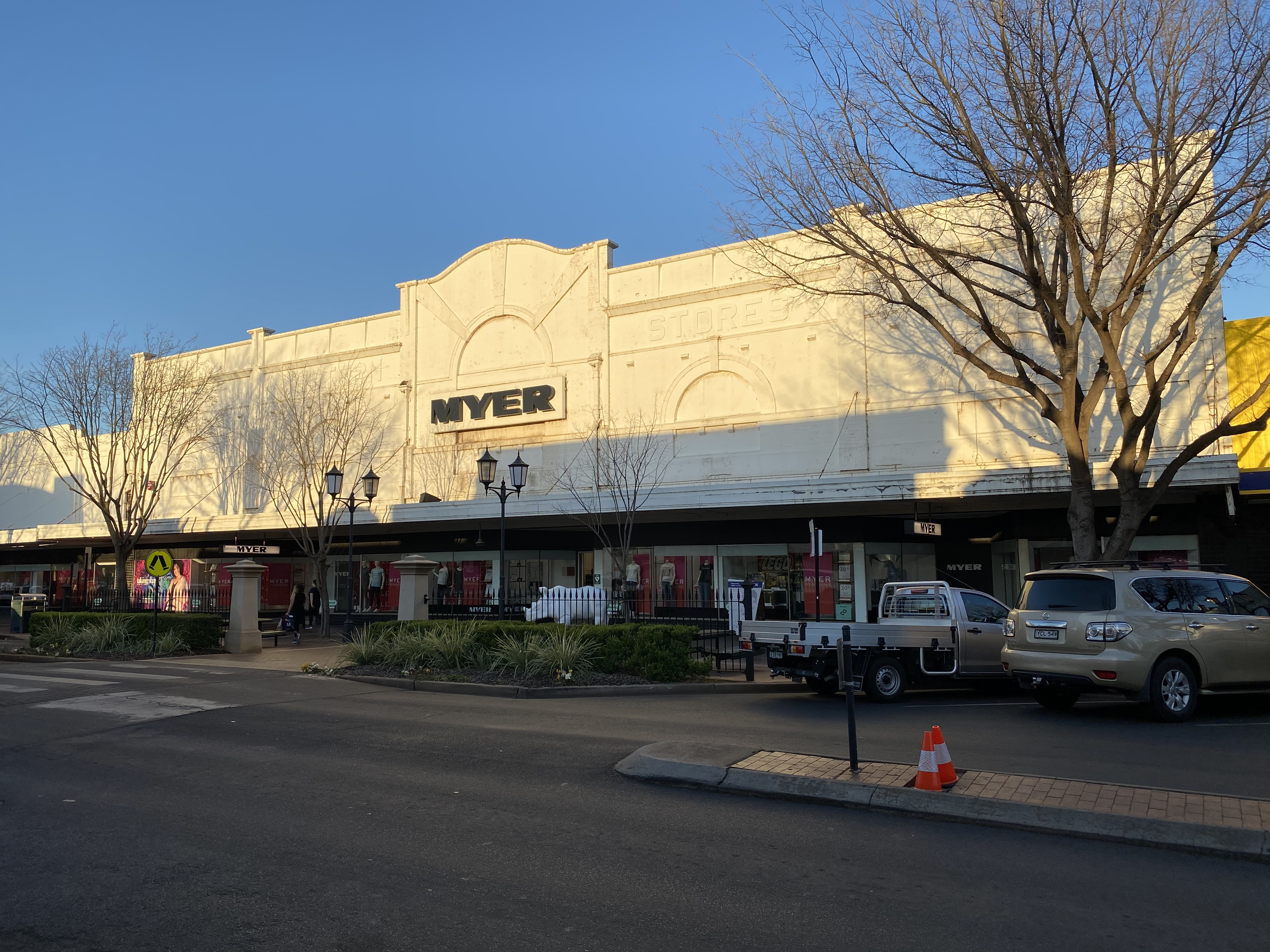
A Western Stores building, now Myer Dubbo, pictured in 2020.

The companies were purchased by Farmers & Coy. of Sydney in the 1960s. Shortly after that, Farmers were purchased by Myer Emporium.

== Locations ==
(Not exhaustive)

- Dubbo - head office
- Bathurst
- Canowindra (sold 1951)
- Carcoar (Enterprise Stores)
- Cessnock (Hustler's)
- Cowra (was Squire Pepper, acquired 1955)
- Crookwell (State Stores)
- Geurie (closed 1932)
- Gosford (Mortimer’s)
- Grafton (City Stores, now South Grafton Emporium)
- Grenfell
- Gilgandra
- Hill End (Great Western Stores)
- Lismore (Sam McLean’s Central Stores, later McLean's Brown & Jolly)
- Milton (H.C. Blackburn's 'The Popular' Store, closed 1973, now Wild Ivy, apple + arrow, and the town's newsagent)
- Molong (was L. A. Nancarrow, acquired 1938)
- Narromine (burnt down by fire in 1967, never rebuilt)
- Newcastle (Hustler's)
- Orange
- Parkes
- Penrith
- Singleton (Hustler's)
- Tamworth
- Trangie (sold 1951, became IGA and Thrifty-Link Hardware and now a Friendly Grocer and Local Liquor)
- Tweed Heads (Morley’s, acquired March 1959)
- Wellington (closed 25 January 1980, became Clancy's, now the town's main art gallery)
- West Maitland (Hustler's)
- Wongarbon (closed 1931)
