= Brian Quinn (businessman) =

Australian businessman and criminal

- Born: 6 July 1936
- Died: c. 2008/09
- Occupation: Former executive chairman of Coles Myer
- Criminal charge: Fraud
- Spouse: Trenna

Brian Edward Quinn (6 July 1936 – c.2008/09) was an Australian businessman who was jailed in 1997 for fraud.

Quinn was a store manager in the 1960s. He rose to become the first executive chairman of the merged Coles Myer retail giant. In the 1990s he was involved with Solomon Lew in the controversial Yannon share transaction. An internal company investigation in 1995 exonerated Lew but accused Quinn of helping organise a secret underwriting of the share transaction which cost Coles Myer $18 million.

In 1997, Quinn was charged with fraud after spending almost $4.5 million of shareholder funds on renovations to his mansion home in Templestowe. The renovations, which included a gilded lavatory and other ornate luxuries, were discovered when an accountant realised that invoices supposedly for the maintenance of company property were actually payments to contractors working on the mansion. Quinn was found guilty and spent time in jail.

The judge in the trial made several scathing comments about the corrupted workplace culture in the Coles Myer group at the time, including: "Fraud by others is no defence to your own fraud." "Is it all that surprising that when they saw the boss hog sticking his snout in the trough they put their snouts in alongside him?" "It is where fraud began that matters and the accused man in this was the father of the fraud." "If the share price was all right and the profit was all right, that he could just about help himself."

Quinn was stripped in 1999 of his appointment as an Officer in the Order of Australia. The AO had been awarded as part of the Queen's Birthday Honours in 1988 for "service to the retail industry".

In 2009, the 73-year-old Quinn was reported to be in ill-health and living with his wife in a luxury apartment in Broadbeach, on Queensland's Gold Coast.
