= Peter Alexander (brand) =

Fashion brand

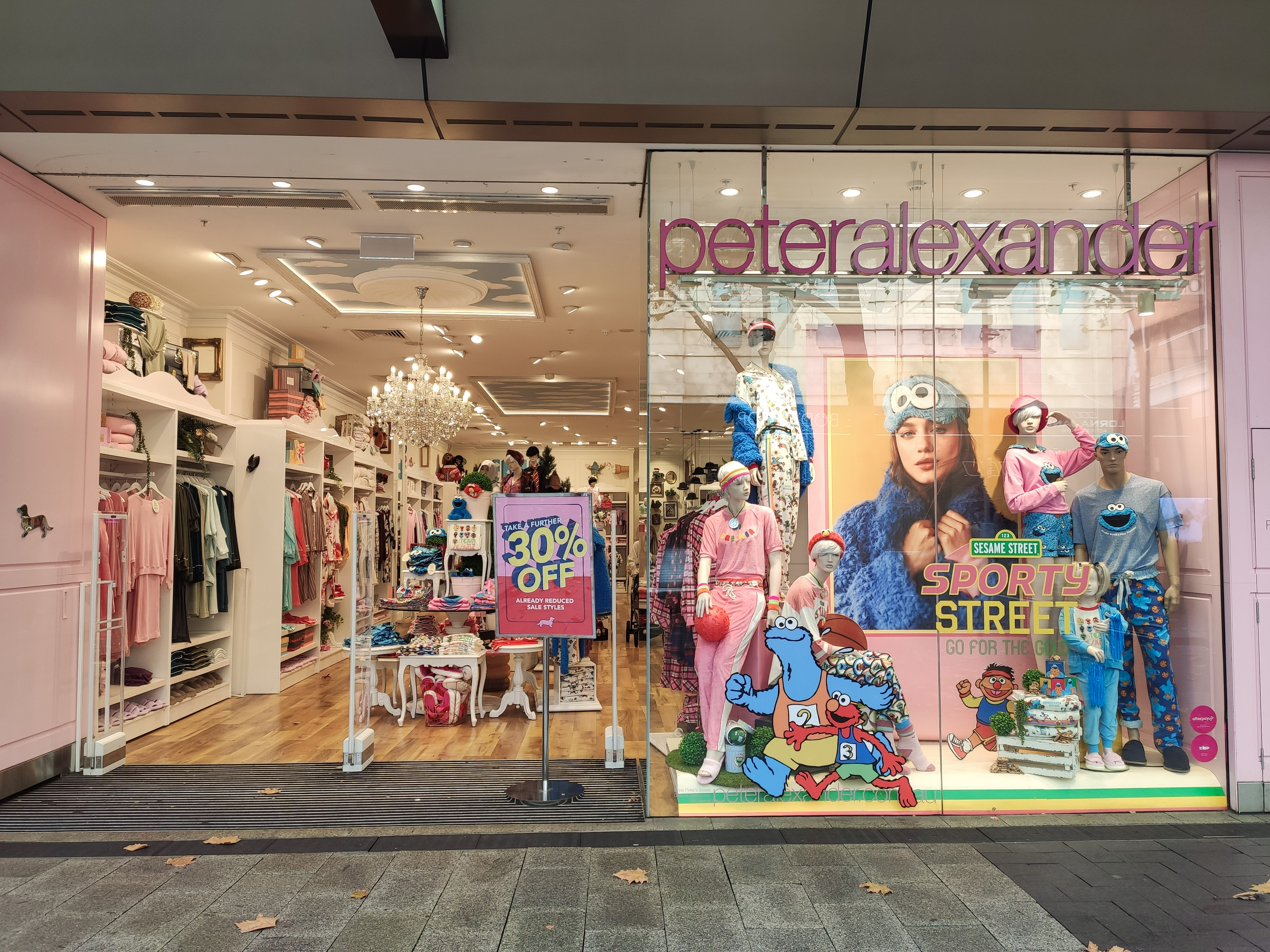
- Peter Alexander store in the Perth CBD
- Type: Subsidiary
- Industry: Fashion; Retail
- Founder: Peter Alexander
- Area served: Australia; New Zealand; United Kingdom (online)
- Parent: Premier Investments
- Website: peteralexander.com.au

Peter Alexander is a brand of pyjamas, loungewear and giftware founded by Peter Alexander. It is owned by Premier Investments.

== History ==
Peter Alexander worked from his mother's dining room table during the early days of the Peter Alexander brand. He initially sold directly to department stores. When a store cancelled an order for 2,000 pairs of pyjamas in 1990, he took out a mail order advertisement in Cleo magazine. Alexander received 6,000 orders from that one advertisement alone.

In 2000, Peter Alexander joined Australian retailer Just Group, comprising the brands Just Jeans, Jay Jays, Jacqui E, Portmans, and Dotti, effectively selling his business although remaining creative director within the structure of the Just Group. After the sale, the brand Peter's PJs increased in popularity and the first stand-alone store was opened in Melbourne Central Melbourne Central Shopping Centre, shortly followed by Chadstone. The Just Group has since expanded its stores into every state of Australia.

In late 2024, Peter Alexander launched in the United Kingdom, with three stores and a UK online store. In August 2026, Premier Investments announced it would close the three UK stores due to "sustained difficult trading conditions".
