= Peter Lew =

Australian businessman

Peter Lew

Peter Lew (born 25 February 1970), is an Australian businessman from Melbourne, and the son of Solomon Lew, a billionaire who provided his children with access to his fortune via a tax-effective trust structures.

He is the Chairman of P Lew Investment Group, owner of the BrandBank Group of Companies and through accessing his father's fortune has extensive interests in retail, financial services and property investments. BrandBank owns the Thurley, Seed Heritage and Seed Femme speciality fashion brands located in Australia, New Zealand, Singapore and Hong Kong, and is the local licence holder for French Connection and Nine West in Australia and New Zealand.

Peter Lew has a Bachelor of Business degree in Banking and Finance from Monash University (Caulfield), after attending Mount Scopus Memorial College, a large Jewish school in Melbourne.

Lew was appointed to the board of clothing retailer Colorado Group in 2002 after his father purchased 20% of the company. Concerns were expressed about Peter Lew's understanding of corporate governance issues when he told the Herald-Sun newspaper that he intended to represent the interests of his father on the board. He said "from my perspective it is good business sense for ARI to be represented on the board and I believe we will make an excellent team." Lew resigned from the board of Colorado in 2004.

Other business interests in the past including his father's companies Witchery. While running the company, Lew was accused by rival company Scanlan & Theodore of copyright infringement in that he copied garments they had sold in their outlets.

He is currently married to Alla Lew and has three children Chloe, Ruby and the youngest, Jade. He married Alla Lew in 2002, who is a year older. Lew's family live in Toorak, in a property that has been the subject of repeated controversies over land tax and the acquisition of neighbouring properties. In 2015, Peter Lew was criticised by Supreme Court of Victoria judge Melanie Sloss for failing to exercise "reasonable diligence" when it emerged his company 65 Albany Road Pty Ltd had been paying double the correct amount of land tax on his home and on an adjacent block for more than twenty years. When the mistake was discovered, Lew successfully pleaded with the Victorian government for a refund, which he partly received but was mostly refused because the claim was lodged too late. Later, media interest arose when Lew's company unsuccessfully sued the Victorian government for $1 million over his over-payment.

His parents, Solomon Lew and Rosie Lew, divorced in 2015 after a four decade marriage. His father remarried in 2018, to a Rosa Prappas, a woman around thirty years younger, and mother Rosie is now in a de facto relationship with former head of the Australian Competition & Consumer Commission, Professor Allan Fels.
