= Just Group =

Clothing retail company owned by Myer

- Type: Subsidiary
- Industry: Retail, clothing
- Founded: 1970; 56 years ago
- Founder: Kimberley family
- Headquarters: Melbourne, Australia
- Area served: Australia; New Zealand
- Key people: Teresa Rendo (managing director)
- Products: Just Jeans; Jay Jays; Jacqui E; Portmans; Dotti
- Parent: Myer
- Website: justgroup.com.au

The Just Group, also known as Apparel Brands, is an Australian and New Zealand company, comprising five fashion retail brands: Just Jeans, Jay Jays, Jacqui E, Portmans and Dotti. The group is owned by parent firm Myer.

== History ==
=== 1970–1990: Founding and growth ===
Just Jeans was founded by the Kimberley family—Craig Kimberley, his wife Connie, brother Roger and sister-in-law Chrissie. Craig was working for textile and fashion manufacturer Aywon at the time and had discovered specialty jeans stores during a business trip to Los Angeles and San Francisco earlier that year. He pitched opening similar stores—first to Aywon, then Coles Myer—but was rejected by both.

The partners raised $4500 and opened their first store on Chapel Street, Prahran in December 1970. The idea of selling jeans stacked on shelves was new to the market, but proved to be popular.

In April 1971, Just Jeans opened its second store in Centre Road, Bentleigh, followed by its third in Moonee Ponds several weeks later. In 1976, Just Jeans bought failed Melbourne menswear chain Walsh's, giving the company its first presence in suburban shopping centres. In the following years, the company expanded to other states by acquiring clothing chains and relaunching them as Just Jeans. In 1979, it purchased the 12-store Jeans Junction chain in New South Wales for $1 million. In the early 1980s, it acquired the Queensland chain Denim in Jeans and the South Australian chain Zip Up. In 1988, it purchased the failed women's fashion chain Central Park, which had 15 stores in Western Australia, for $2 million.

In the 1982, Just Jeans bought the MSD chain of sporting goods stores for $500,000. The venture proved to be a failure and Just Jeans sold MSD two years later for $1.

Roger Kimberley built his own fashion chain called Cheap Jeans. Just Jeans bought his 50-store business in 1985 and relaunched it as Jeans Extra. Craig and Connie also acquired Roger's stake in Just Jeans. The following year, Jeans Extra was relaunched again as Extra Clothing then in late 1987 the business was sold to Sportscraft for an estimated $30 million. Three months before the sale of Extra Clothing, the Kimberleys sold 30% of Just Jeans to the Mallcap Corporation for $8 million. The funds were used to cover a $5.5 million tax bill and give the company a better financial footing. In April 1988, Mallcap sold its stake to Byron Holdings.

=== 1990–2000: Expansion to New Zealand and acquisitions ===
In June 1990, Just Jeans launched its first store in New Zealand. By January 1991, Just Jeans had 238 stores across Australia and New Zealand. In April 1993, Just Jeans went public and the Kimberleys reduced their stake from 70 per cent to 58 per cent.

In December 1993, Just Jeans purchased Jay Jays for $4.5 million. In September 1994, Just Jeans acquired the 50-store womenswear chain Jacqueline Eve for $4.6 million. The chain was repositioned to focus on working women aged 30–45 and, in February 1996, was relaunched as Jacqui E. Later in 1996, Just Jeans attempted to purchase the eight-store Melbourne surfwear chain Jetty Surf Shop. However, when three of Jetty's biggest suppliers said they would not supply products to stores owned by Just Jeans, the deal collapsed. In 2000, Just Jeans acquired Peter Alexander Sleepwear. Founder Peter Alexander stayed with the company as creative director.

=== 2001–2024: Changing ownership and new brands ===
In 2001, Just Jeans was taken private in a $108 million management buyout led by British-based private investment group Catalyst Investment Managers. In May 2002, Just Jeans acquired women's clothing chain Portmans.

The Just Group was listed on the ASX in May 2004. In August 2004, the Just Group acquired the Dotti chain for $5 million. In July 2007, the Just Group acquired stationery chain Smiggle for at least $29 million, becoming the first non-fashion brand in its portfolio.

On 8 August 2008, Premier Investments obtained a controlling interest in the shares of Just Group following an off-market takeover offer for all of the group shares that commenced on 31 March 2008. Just Group was delisted from the Australian Securities Exchange on 22 September 2008.

In 2011, the group was criticised for using sandblasting to wash off their jeans, a method known to cause silicosis. In 2013, the group was still using sandblasting. The Baptist World Aid's 2015 Fashion Report named the Just Group one of the worst performers when it comes to protecting international workers. From 2012 to 2015, the group went through its digital retail transformation.

In October 2016, the Just Group lost its trial against its former CFO Nicole Peck who had left the company to work for a competing company. In August 2017, the brand director of the group, Colette Garnsey, stepped down for medical reasons.

Richard Murray commenced as Premier Retail Chief Executive Officer on 6 September 2021, and was appointed to the Premier Board as executive director on 3 December 2021.

=== 2024–present: Sale of Apparel Brands to Myer ===
In March 2024, Premier Investments announced plans to spin off Smiggle into an independent company by the end of January 2025 and explore a spin-off of Peter Alexander for sometime in 2025. However, in September 2024, Premier decided to postpone the Smiggle demerger to focus on a possible sale of its Apparel Brands division (Just Jeans, Jay Jays, Jacqui E, Portmans and Dotti) to Myer. Earlier in September, Premier Investments also sacked Smiggle chief executive John Cheston for "serious misconduct and a serious breach of his employment terms".

In late October 2024, Premier and Myer announced they had reached a deal for Myer to buy the Apparel Brands division. As part of the transaction, Myer will issue new shares (worth $863.78 million) to Premier Investments while Premier will contribute $82 million to the business. Apparel Brands became part of Myer in January 2025 after the deal received shareholder approval. Peter Alexander and Smiggle remained part of Premier.

== Brands ==
- Just Jeans
- Jay Jays – Acquired in 1993.
- Jacqui E – Founded as Jacqueline Eve, acquired in 1994.
- Portmans – Acquired in 2002.
- Dotti – Founded by Ray Levis and Linda Bowen in 1981, acquired in 2004.
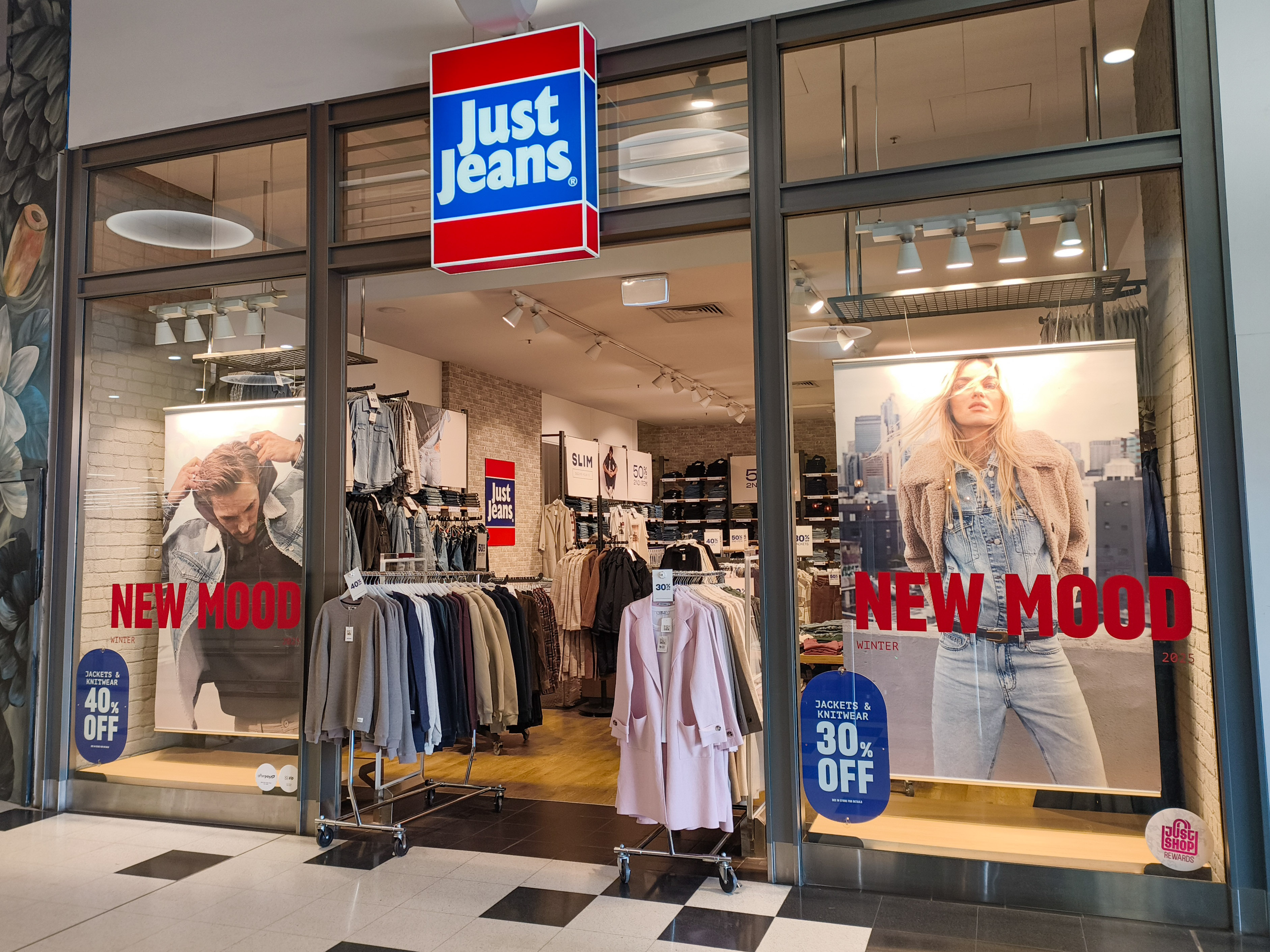
Just Jeans store in Margaret River

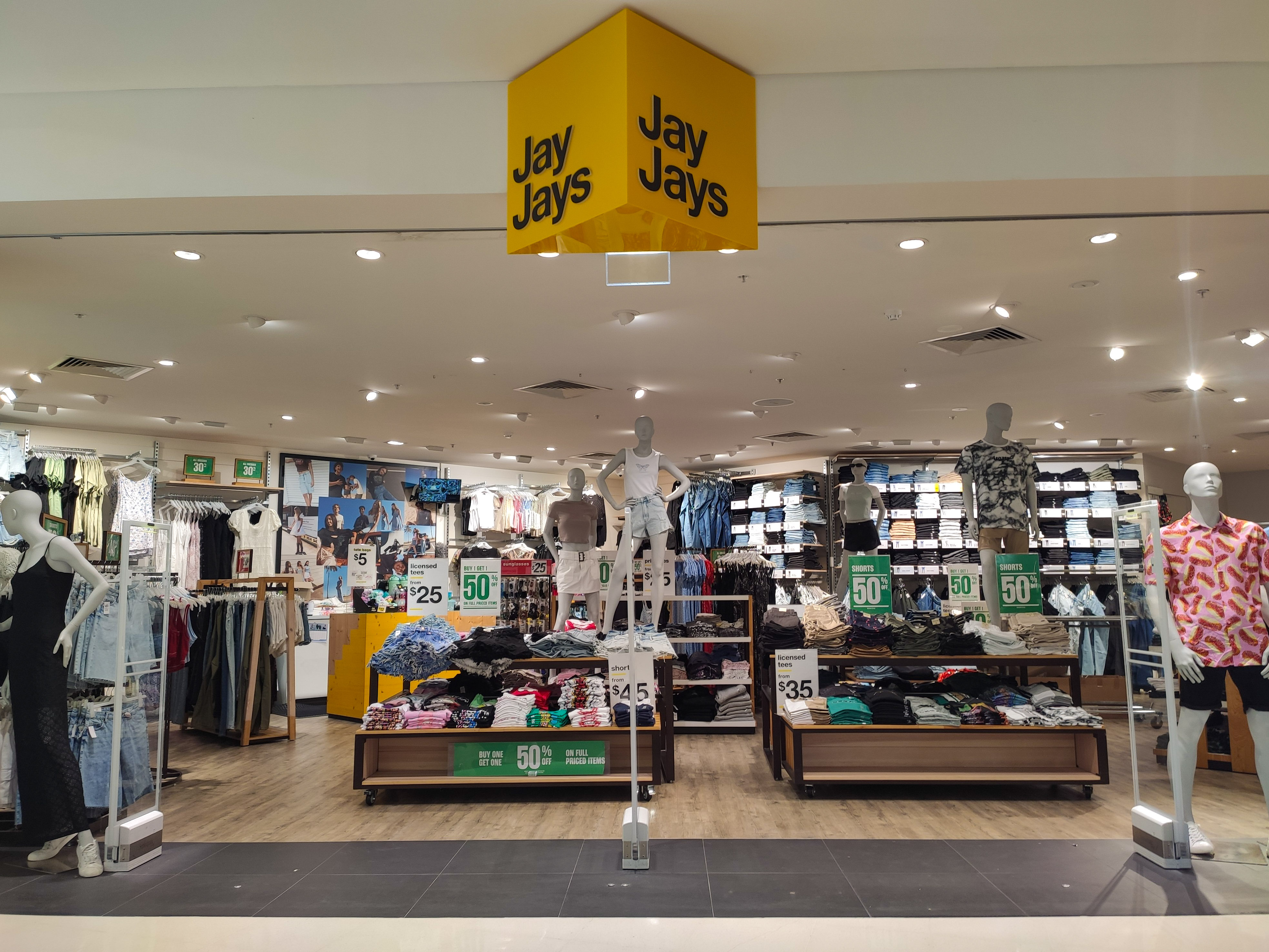
Jay Jays store in Armadale Central

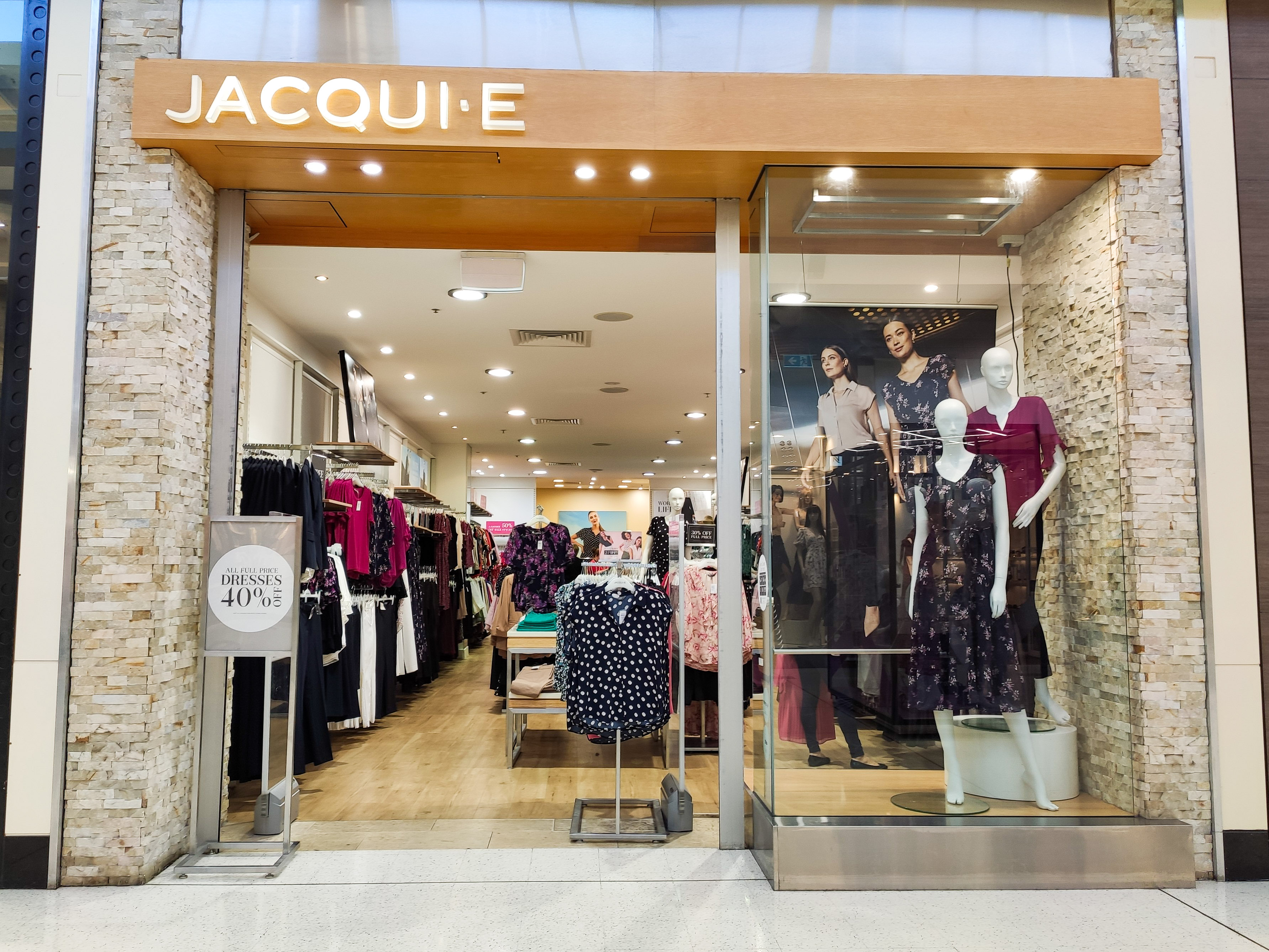
Jacqui E store in Westfield Booragoon

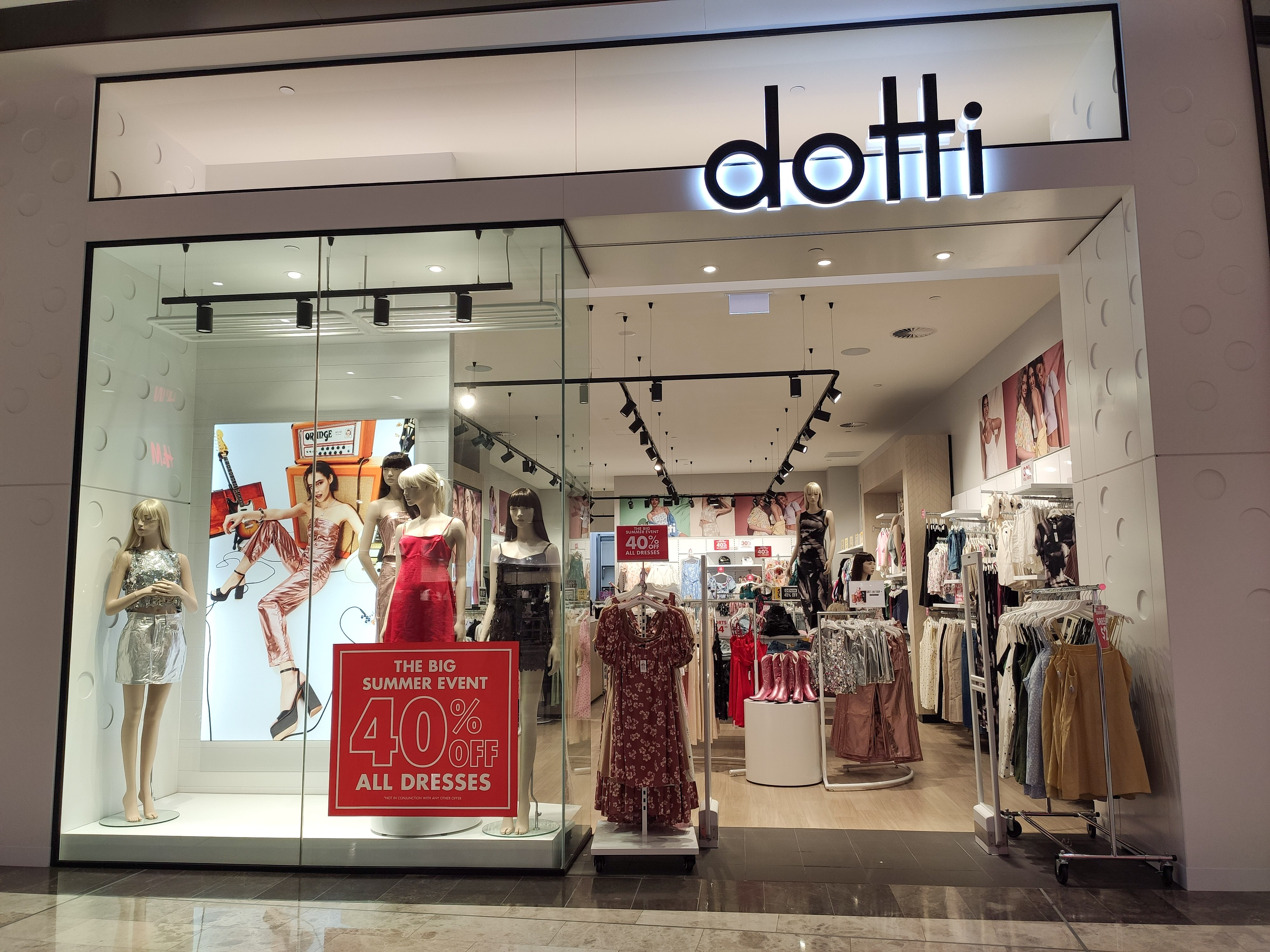
Dotti store in Westfield Carousel
