= Dotti (retailer) =

Australian clothing store chain owned by Just Group

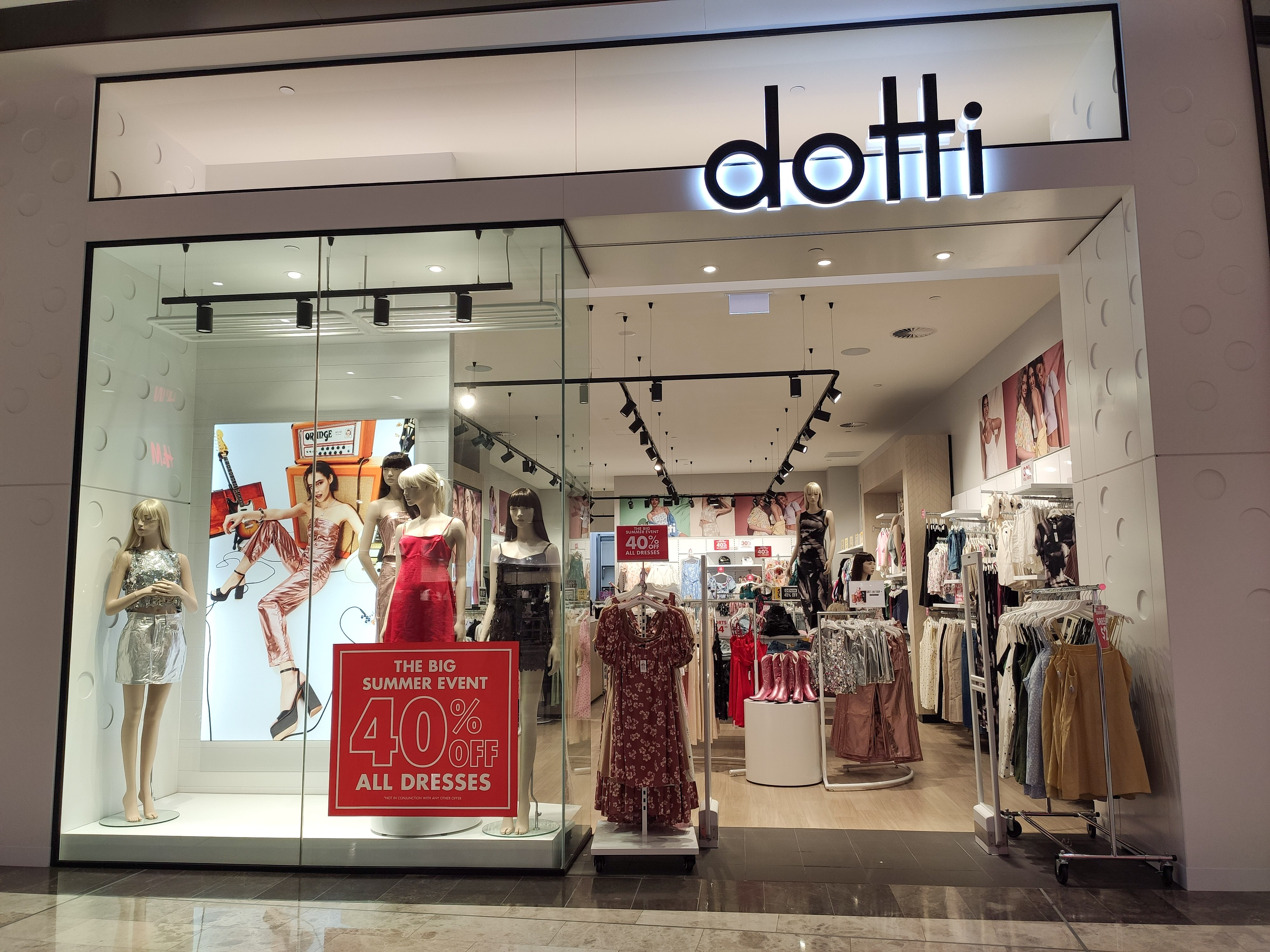
- Dotti store in Westfield Carousel
- Founded: 1981
- Founder: Raymond Levis; Linda Bowen
- Number of locations: 88 stores in Australia (2023)
- Area served: Australia; New Zealand
- Parent: Just Group
- Website: dotti.jgl.com.au

Dotti is a chain of fashion stores in Australia and New Zealand, selling apparel and accessories. It was acquired by the Just Group in 2004. It markets itself as a fast fashion brand. Their target group is young female adults aged 18 to 28.

== History ==
Dotti was founded by Raymond Levis and Linda Bowen in Sydney in 1981. The name "Dotti" may have been inspired by Linda's mother Dorothy, or Via Condotti, a street in Rome known for its fashion stores.

In August 2004, the Just Group acquired Dotti for A$5 million.

In December 2009, Dotti opened its 100th store in a shopping centre in Melbourne's western suburbs.

In April 2011, Dotti launched an online store, adding a New Zealand specific online shopping site in 2015.

By 2017 they had 220 stores, 198 in Australia and 22 in New Zealand.
