= Jay Jays =

Australian apparel store chain owned by Just Group

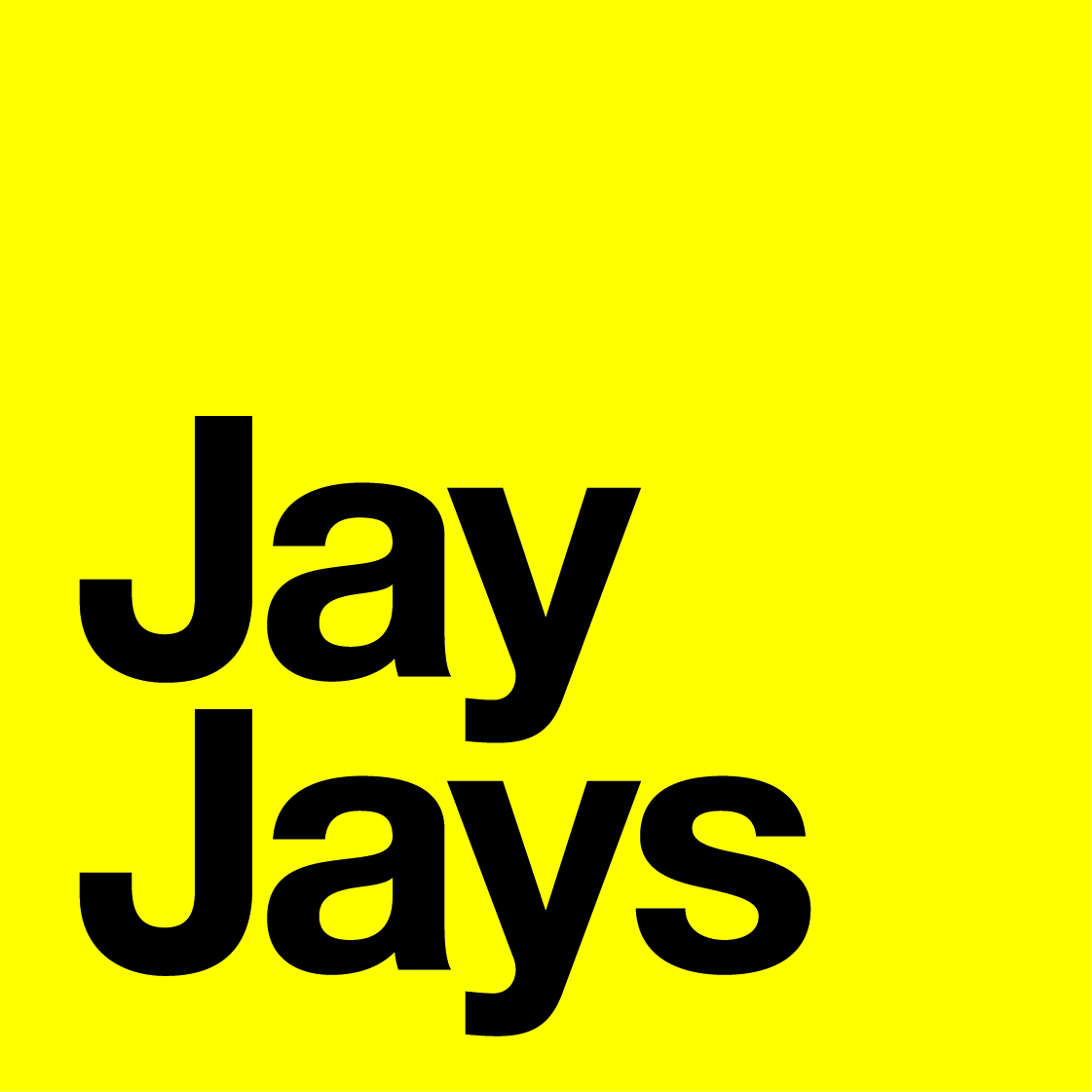

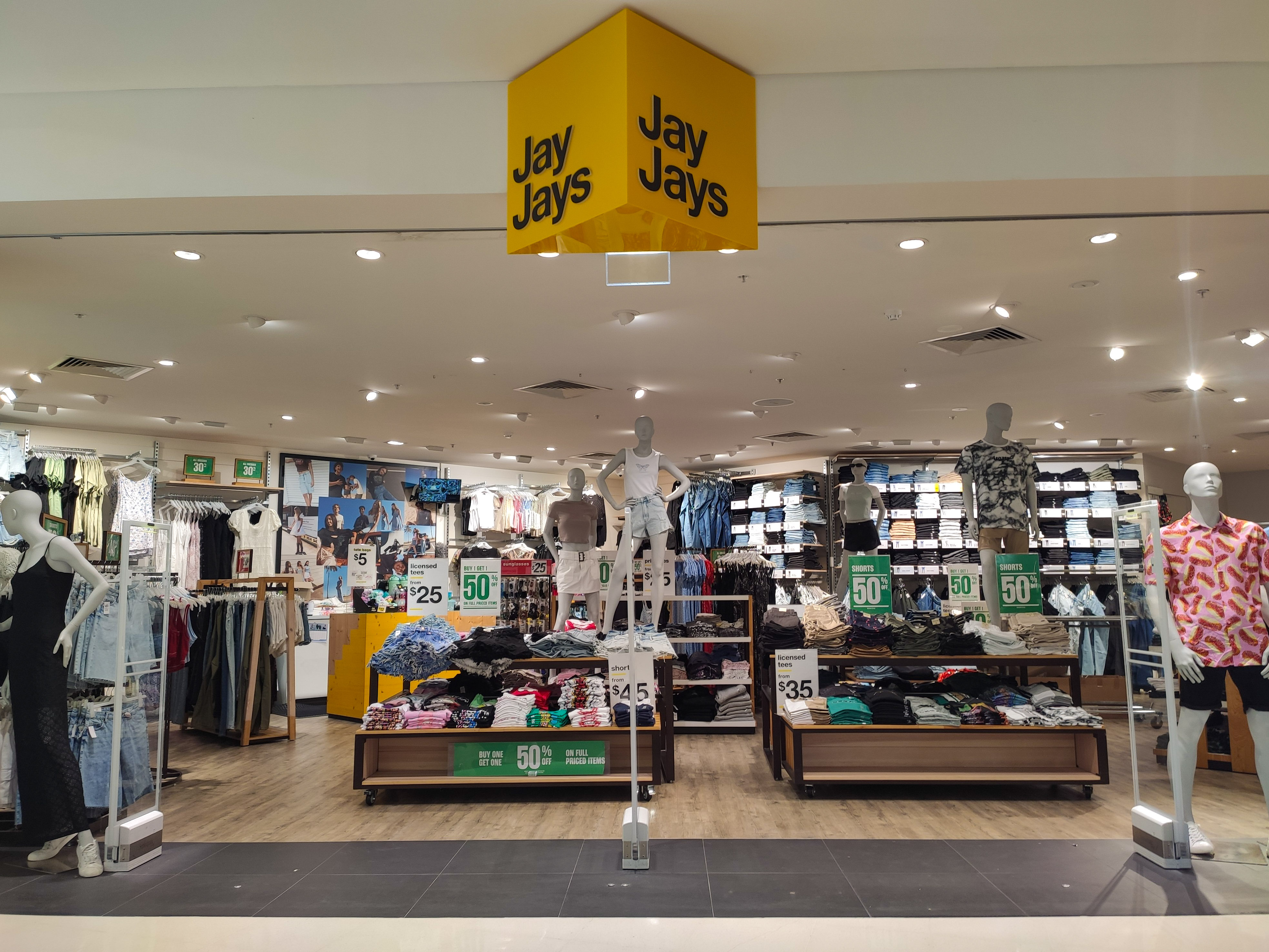
- Jays Jays store in Armadale Central Shopping Centre
- Type: Subsidiary
- Industry: Retail
- Number of locations: 172 stores in Australia (2023)
- Key people: Colette Garnsey (Executive Director - Core Brands, Just Group); Nathan Whitehead (General Manager)
- Products: Clothing, accessories
- Parent: Just Group
- Website: jayjays.jgl.com.au

Jay Jays is an Australian apparel chain store. It is owned and operated by the Just Group. Jay Jays focuses on clothing for younger people. At present, the chain has over 200 stores located in Australia and New Zealand.

== History ==
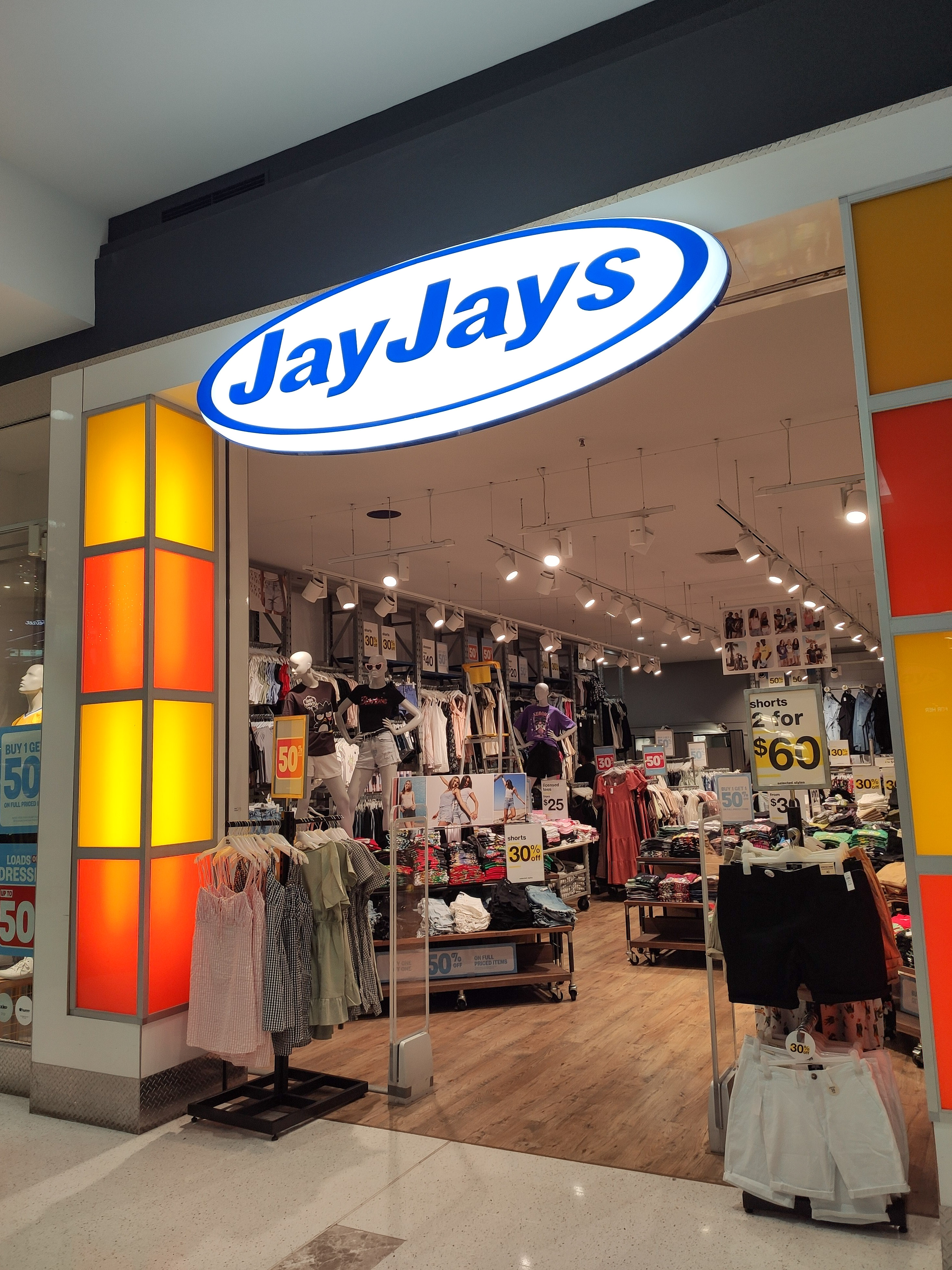
Jays Jays store with the older branding

Prior to being acquired by the Just Group, Jay Jays was known as Jay Jays Jeans Warehouse, which was started in 1978 in Sydney by two brothers who had immigrated to Australia from Poland in the 1950s.

In December 1993, Just Jeans purchased Jay Jays for $4.5 million. It had six-stores at the time.

Jay Jays opened its first New Zealand store in September 1996.
