= Westfield Burwood =

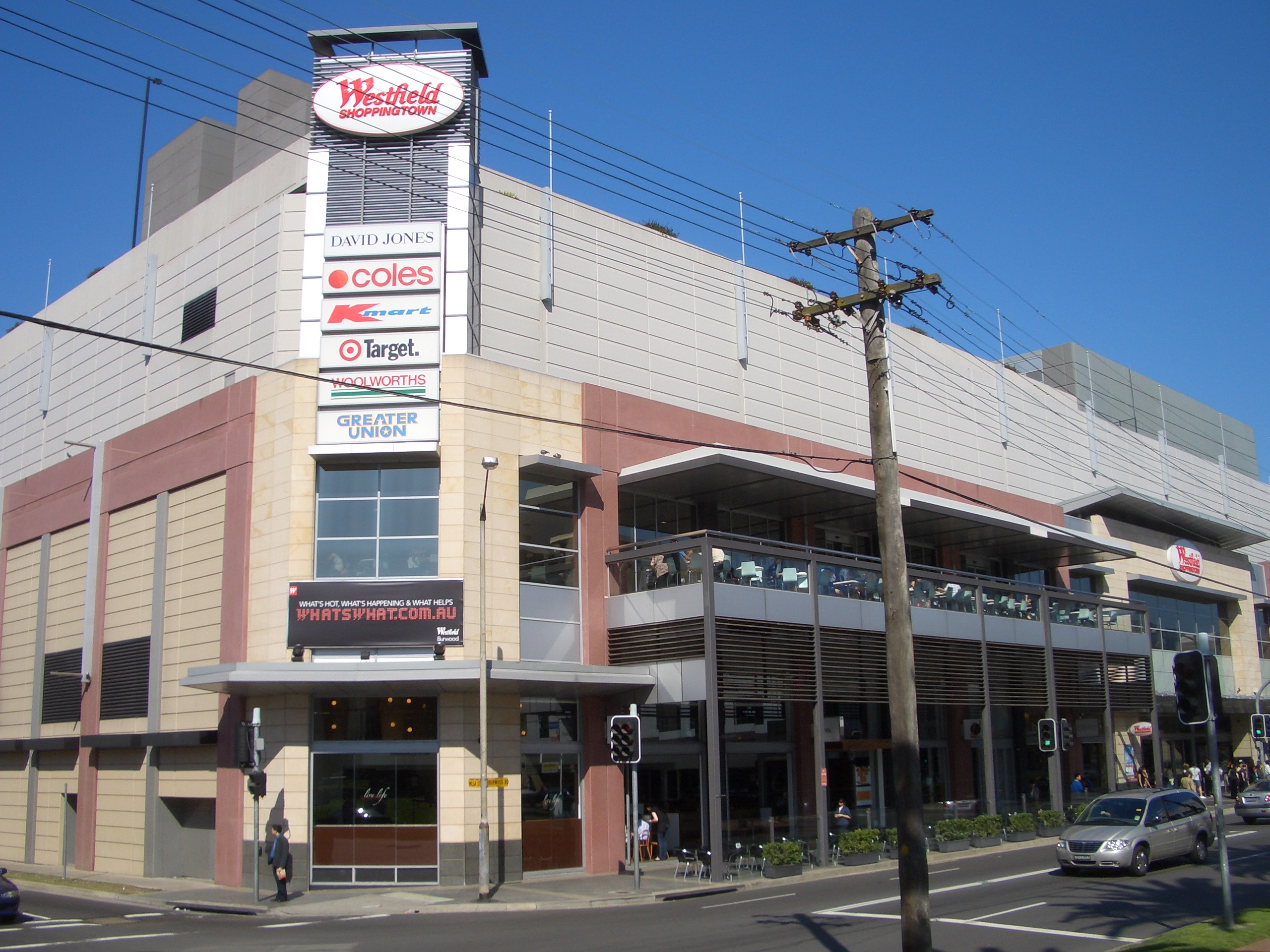
- Location: Burwood, New South Wales, Australia
- Coordinates: 33°52′29″S 151°06′21″E
- Address: 100 Burwood Road
- Opened: October 1966 (original); 17 August 2000 (new)
- Manager: Scentre Group
- Owner: Scentre Group (50%); Perron Group (50%)
- Num. of stores: 236
- Num. of anchor tenants: 7
- Floor area: 63,204 m^{2} (680,322 sq ft)
- Floors: 5
- Parking: 3,014 spaces
- Public transit: Burwood railway station
- Website: www.westfield.com/burwood/

Westfield Burwood is a large shopping centre in Burwood, Sydney, Australia.

== History ==
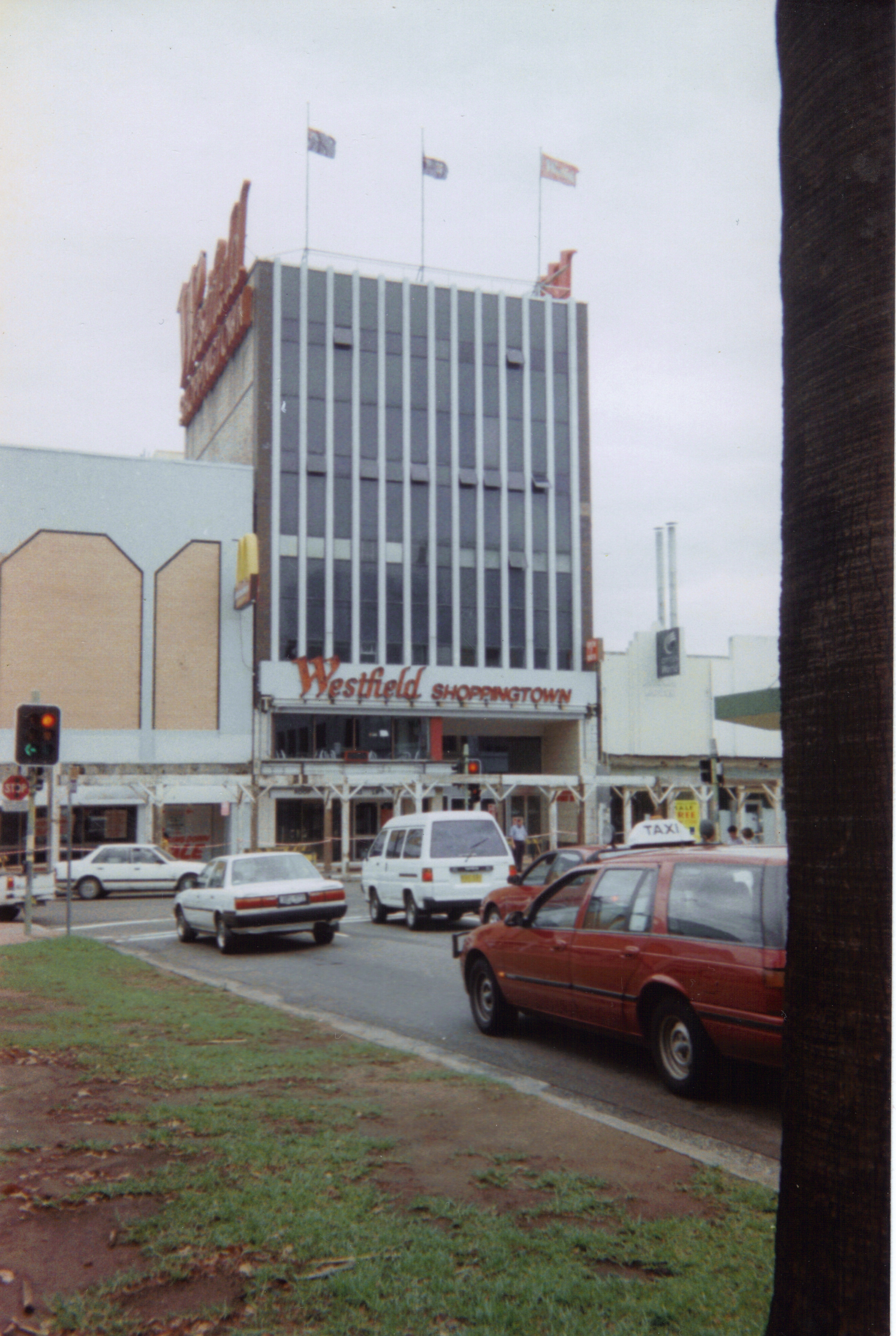
Old Westfield Burwood, view from Burwood Park

The original Westfield Burwood first opened on 11 October 1966 by premier Robert Askin, and was one of the first shopping centres in Australia. The centre was known as Westfield Shoppingtown Burwood and was the first Westfield to contain the Westfield logo and to be branded as "shoppingtown". Shoppingtown was the idea that the centre would contain more than just shops, but professional services like cinemas, petrol stations, doctors and dentists.

Westfield Burwood was built on a slope which meant that it was the first centre that facilitated an incline mall design. This meant that the centre was a gently-ascending grade and that the levels were connected via a system of ramps, stairs and escalators. The centre also featured a circular stage and an ornate air fountain which shoots controlled compressed air with metallic coloured balls in the air.

The original centre was half the size it is today, and was first to have a Hoyts cinema inside the centre (later closed sometime in the 1980s). Westfield Burwood was partially built on the site of the old Hoyts Astor theatre which was rebuilt as the Hoyts Burwood. Westfield Burwood featured Farmers, Coles New World, Mark Foy's and Winns. In 1972 the centre expanded by acquiring land south on Victoria Street and a Fosseys store opened on that site which operated until its closure in 1993 and was taken over by Target. Westfield Burwood was again redeveloped in 1976 with the addition of Nock & Kirby. In November 1976, the Farmers store was rebranded to Myer which was then renamed Grace Bros on 18 April 1983.

In January 1999, the centre underwent a $300 million redevelopment, and was the first Westfield to be completely demolished and rebuilt. This redevelopment doubled the size of the original centre and allowed for more stores in the centre. Westfield Burwood featured Grace Bros (rebranded to Myer in 2004), Kmart, Target, Coles and Woolworths. Westfield Burwood was the first Westfield in NSW to feature 'The Street' entertainment and lifestyle precinct with a 12 screen Greater Union (now Event Cinemas) cinema complex. The centre also featured 'Food on the Park', an 800-seat food court that extends to a balcony overlooking the park, and 'The Market' precinct, which feature fresh food retailers outside Coles. The new Westfield Burwood was opened on 17 August 2000.

On 24 March 2007 Myer closed and was replaced by David Jones which opened on 5 May 2007 by model Megan Gale. The change from Myer to David Jones paralleled a swap in the opposite direction (from David Jones to Myer) at Bankstown Central in 2008, which was attributed to demographic change. After these two changes, Burwood replaced Bankstown as the location of the only David Jones store west of the CBD stores (on Market Street and Elizabeth Street) and east of the Parramatta store. A new cosmetics department was built, the whole top floor was renovated and carpets were relaid in some sections. Store fittings in other departments remained the same.

In July 2014, as part of a restructure of the Westfield Group, it came under the control of the Scentre Group. In May 2019, Scentre Group sold a half stake for $575 million to the Perron Group.

== Tenants ==
Westfield Burwood has 63,204m² of floor space. The major retailers and stores include Aldi, Coles, David Jones, Event Cinemas, JB Hi-Fi, Kmart, Rebel, Target and Woolworths.

== Transport ==
The Northern Line, Leppington & Inner West Line and Liverpool & Inner West Line offer frequent train services to Burwood station which is a short walk from the centre.

Westfield Burwood has Transit Systems bus connections to Sydney CBD, Inner West, Northern Sydney and Greater Western Sydney, as well as local surrounding suburbs. The majority of its bus services are located on Burwood Road, Victoria Road and Shaftsbury Road.

Westfield Burwood has multi level car parks with 3,014 spaces.
