= Galleria Shopping Centre (Perth) =

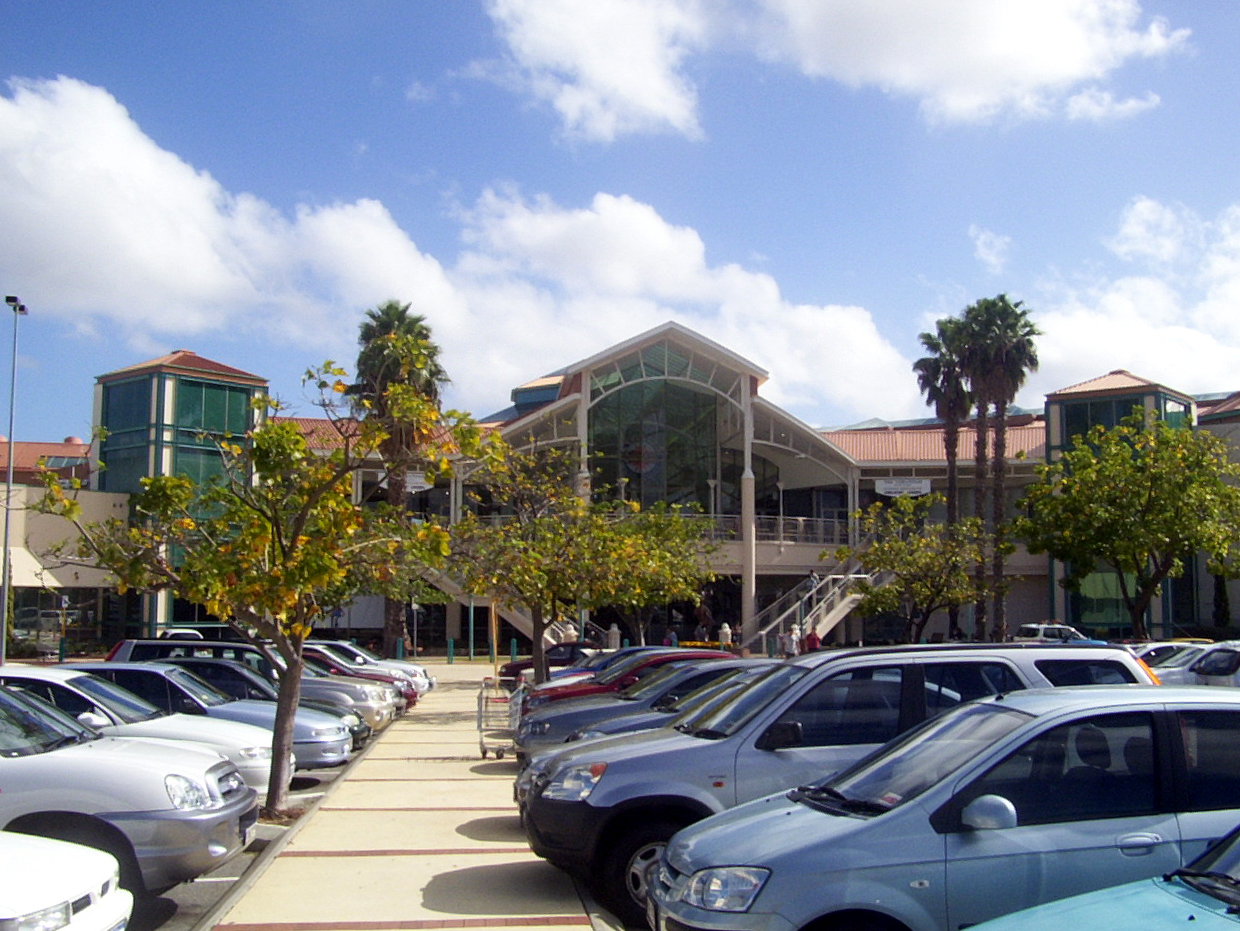
- Entrance
- Location: Morley, Western Australia
- Coordinates: 31°53′50″S 115°53′57″E
- Opened: 1994; 32 years ago
- Developer: Coles Myer, Colonial Mutual
- Manager: Vicinity Centres
- Owner: Vicinity Centres (50%); Perron Group (50%)
- Num. of stores: 166
- Num. of anchor tenants: 5
- Floor area: 73,365 m^{2} (789,690 sq ft)
- Floors: 2 of stores and 2 of car parking
- Parking: 6233
- Website: Official website

Galleria Shopping Centre (formerly known as Westfield Galleria, Centro Galleria and Galleria) is a shopping centre in Morley, about 8 kilometres (5 mi) northeast of the Perth central business district. It is the fifth largest shopping centre in Western Australia, with several major retailers and approximately 300 specialty retailers.

The present centre was constructed in stages between 1988 with Coles and Kmart Australia opening, and in 1994 with the addition of Greater Union and Myer. In 2008 a new area on level 2 was constructed for Rebel Sports. Although plans for a major redevelopment were first announced in 2013, construction only commenced in September 2025, with the first stage of the redevelopment opening in November 2026.

== History ==
The shopping centre was developed as a joint construction between Colonial Mutual and Coles Myer. Construction started in 1989 after a fire had destroyed the Boans complex in June 1986. Construction joined three separate shopping centres – Morley Shopping Centre (Coles and Kmart), Morley City Shopping Centre (Woolworths and Target) and Boans Shopping Centre – which were demolished to make way for Galleria. The 1994 redevelopment was designed by the Los Angeles architects RTKL Associates and local firm Oldham Boas Ednie-Brown Architects, Planners & Interior Designers (now known as The Buchan Group). The centre was officially opened on 26 September 1994.

In 1996, Galleria was sold in its entirety by joint owners Coles Myer and Colonial Mutual to Westfield Group for $289 million; the centre was renamed as Westfield Galleria.

In 2003, Galleria was acquired from Westfield by Centro Properties Group for $414 million and renamed to Centro Galleria. Westfield Group continued to operate the centre until late 2004 when Centro Properties Group officially took over management of the centre. Along with this, the entrance to Greater Union on the upper-deck parking lot was removed, and replaced with a small outdoor dining piazza. In 2012, private property investment group, Perron Group, acquired 50% of Galleria, entering a co-ownership arrangement with Centro.

In mid-2012, Centro Galleria rebranded as Galleria 220 (to represent its 220 stores), and later simply Galleria, while still under Centro's management. In 2013, Centro rebranded as Federation Centres, and in November, Galleria shopping centre was rebranded as simply Galleria, to match the other centres in the chain. In 2015, Federation Centres rebranded as Vicinity Centres after merging with Novion Property Group.

On 3 February 2015, a transformer exploded around 9:30 am near the Woolworths loading bay area resulting in the deaths of two people and others suffering serious burn injuries.

In March 2017, major German tenant Aldi opened outside of the complex, replacing the old Morley Library.

On 29 August 2025, a man drove a ute through the shopping centre, and attempted to gain access to a store by driving into its roller door before fleeing unsuccessfully. He was arrested shortly afterwards at a nearby pub. The incident occurred in the early morning outside of opening hours, and no injuries were reported.

In September 2025, Event Cinemas announced that Greater Union Morley would be closing down, with its last session screened on 14 September. The closure of Greater Union Morley marked the end of the Greater Union branding, as it was the last cinema in Australia trading under the Greater Union name. The cinema closed just before its 31st anniversary and had retained its original signage and branding dating back to its opening in 1994.

=== Redevelopment ===
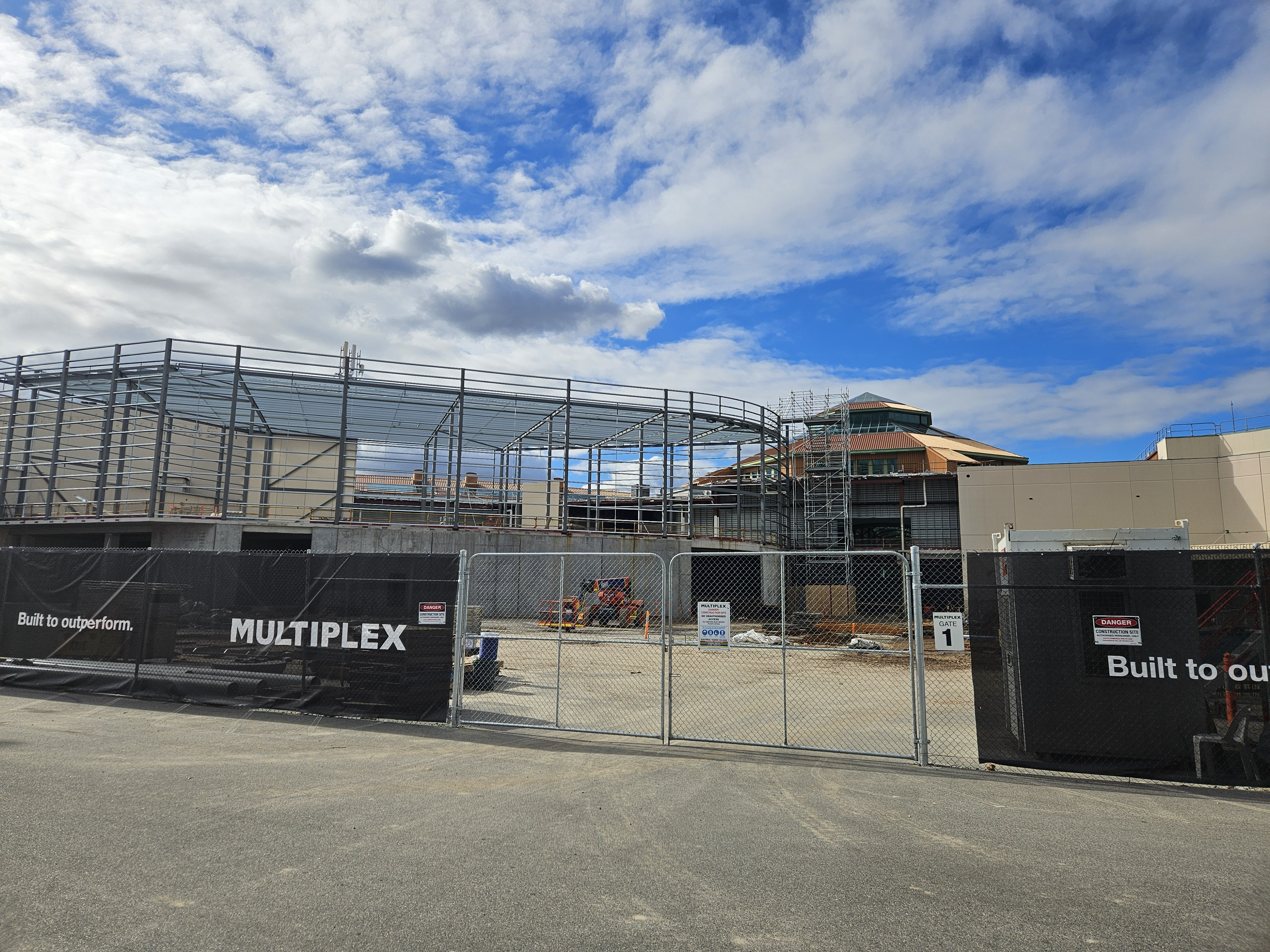
The Morley Galleria shopping centre during redevelopment

Plans for a major redevelopment of the centre were first announced in 2013. Revised plans for the $350 million shopping centre expansion were later approved on 11 February 2019. The original redevelopment plans were intended to expand the shopping centre's floor area from 73,365 square metres (789,690 sq ft) to 180,235 square metres (1,940,030 sq ft), with the number of car bays rising from 4086 to 7200. The centre could have ultimately ended up with as much as 263,500 square metres (2,836,000 sq ft) of floor space, though some elements were not expected to be completed until 2031.

However by July 2024, apart from minor works and the relocation of a drainage basin, the redevelopment had largely yet to commence, resulting in frustration from the local community and leaving the centre "a shadow of its former self" as some retailers had already vacated storefronts and parts of the centre were closed off in anticipation for the delayed redevelopment.

In response to the intense criticism over the delayed redevelopment, in February 2025 Vicinity asserted that the revamp would begin later in 2025. On 20 August 2025, Vicinity announced a smaller in scope $240 million redevelopment for the centre, which will consist of a revitalisation of the existing malls and the addition of a new alfresco dining and entertainment precinct called The Terrace. A new cinema will also be opened, to be operated by Hoyts and Ace Cinemas. Construction commenced in September 2025 with an expected completion by late 2026. In February 2026, Myer announced they would refurbish their Galleria store with the refurbishment expected to be complete in October 2026, in time for the opening of the greater redevelopment of Galleria and the Christmas trading season.

On 20 August 2026, Vicinity Centres released a list of 75 new retailers which would be opening in the refurbished Galleria, divided into 39 "fashion", 5 "tech and lifestyle", 10 "health and beauty", and 21 "dining and entertainment" businesses. In October 2026, it was revealed that the Fashion Mall would be the first stage of the redevelopment to open on 5 November 2026, with the new entertainment and dining precinct to open later that month.

== Transport ==
Multiple Transperth bus services operate from Galleria bus station.
