= Bankstown Central =

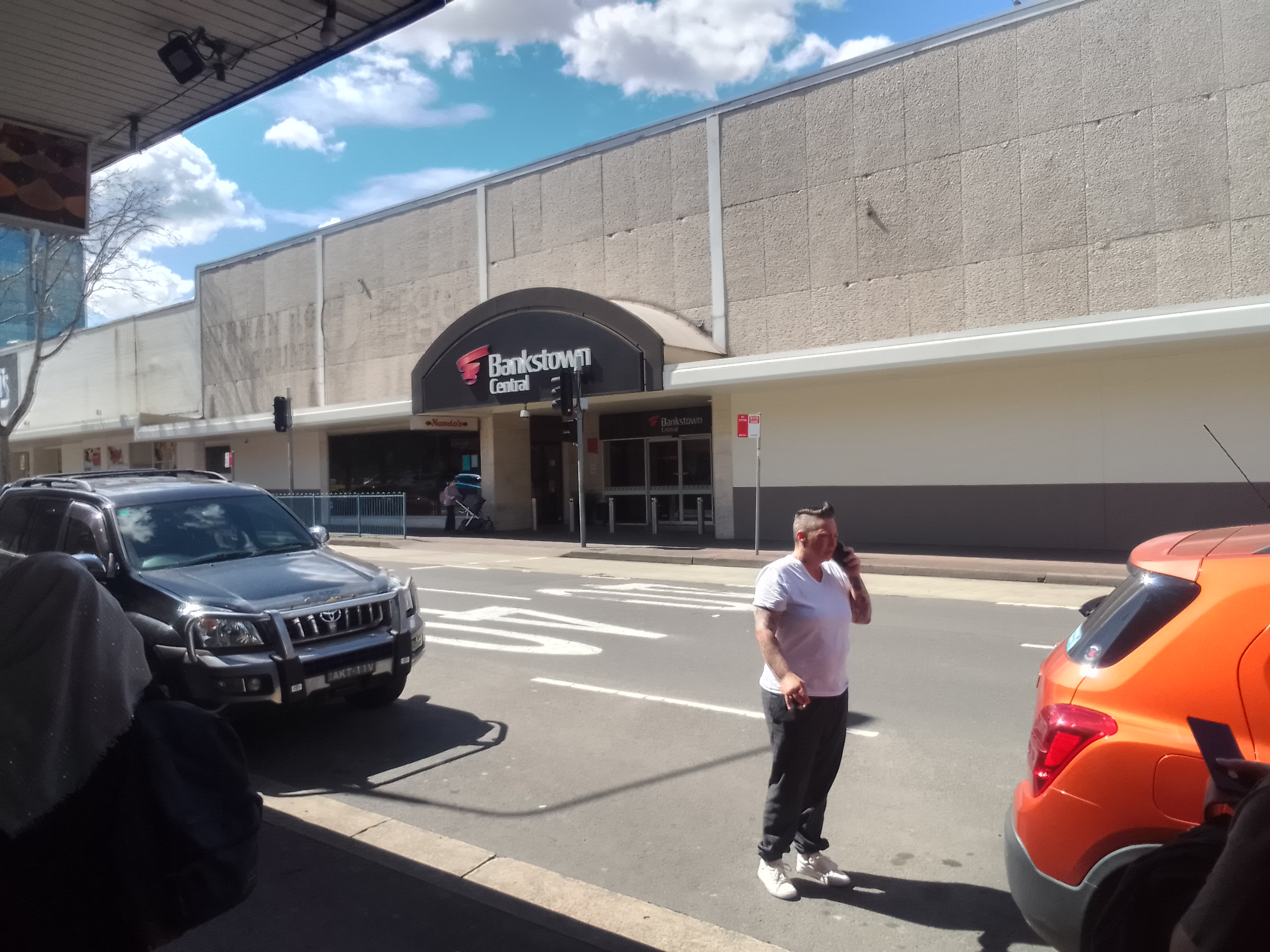
- Secondary entrance in 2022
- Location: Bankstown, New South Wales, Australia
- Coordinates: 33°54′58″S 151°02′18″E
- Address: North Terrace
- Opened: 21 September 1966
- Manager: Vicinity Centres
- Owner: Vicinity Centres (50%); Challenger (50%)
- Num. of stores: 277
- Num. of anchor tenants: 6
- Floor area: 86,306 m^{2} (928,990 sq ft)
- Floors: 3
- Parking: 3,224
- Public transit: Bankstown railway station
- Website: bankstowncentral.com.au

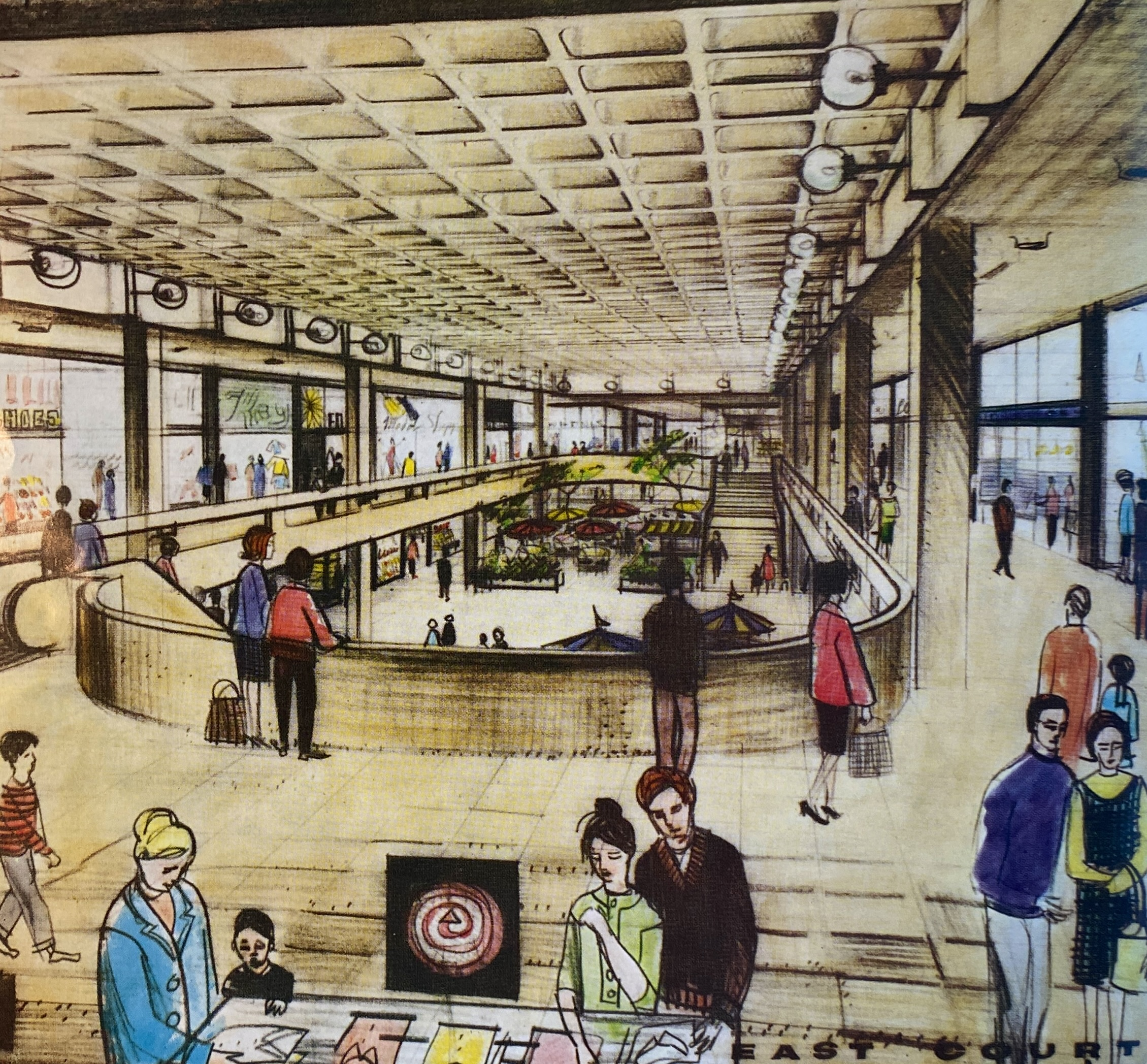
Artist's impression, 1965

Bankstown Central (previously known as Centro Bankstown and Bankstown Square) is a shopping centre in the suburb of Bankstown in South Western Sydney.

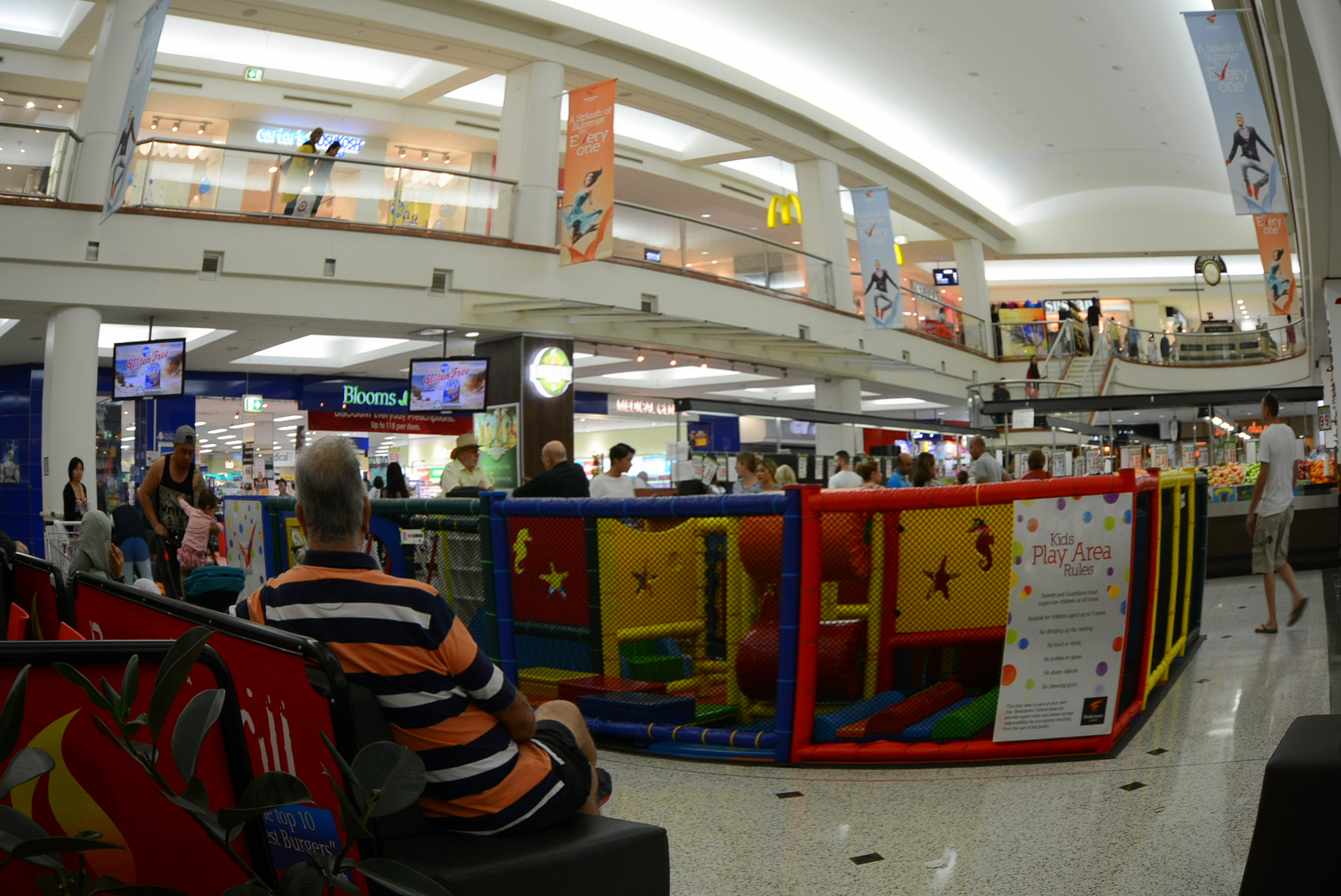
Interior of Bankstown Central in 2015

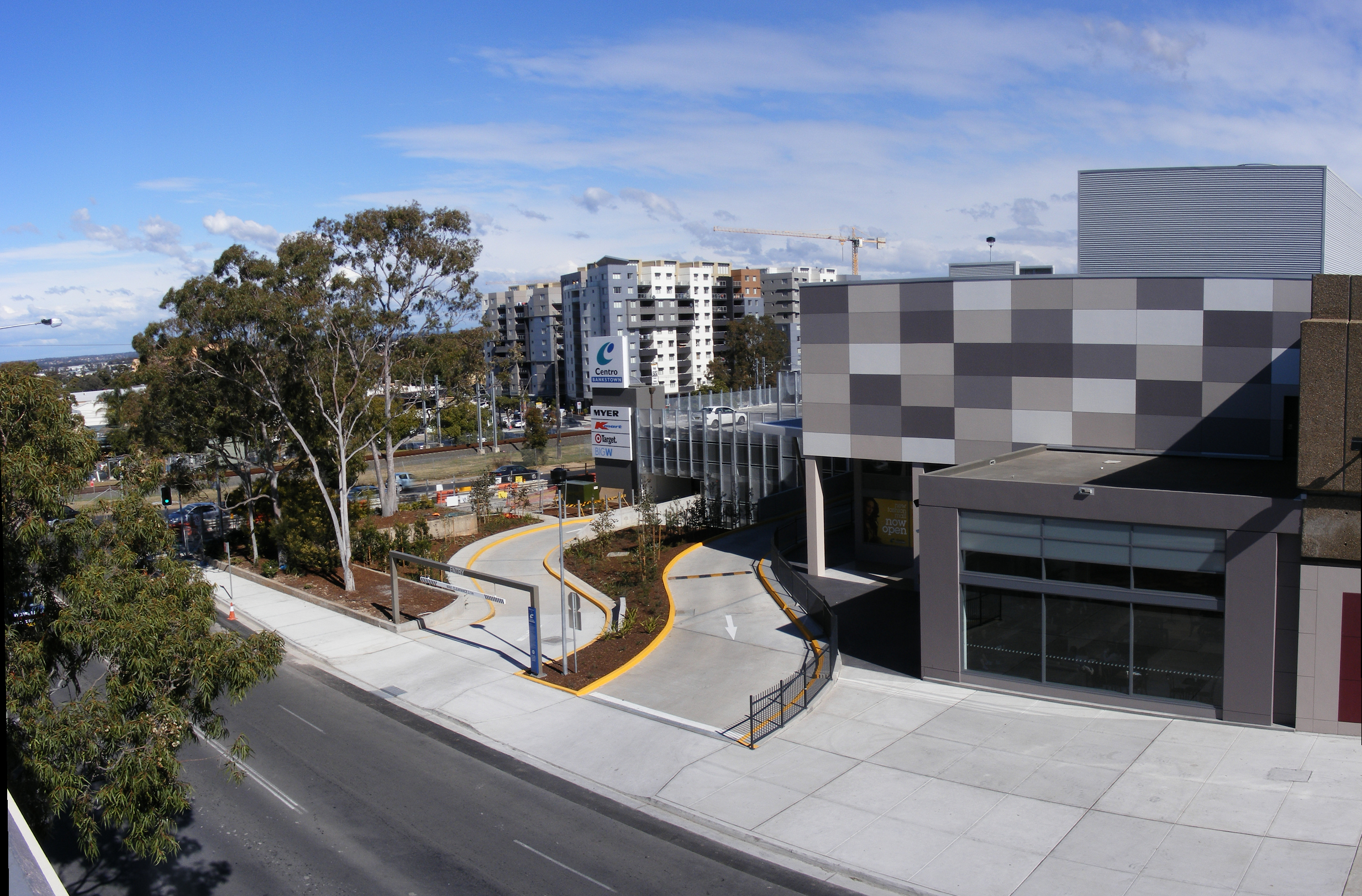
Centro Bankstown after the 2008 redevelopment completion

== History ==
Bankstown Square opened on 21 September 1966 by Lady Cutler, the wife of the Governor of New South Wales, Roden Cutler. The centre was developed and owned by Lendlease and was at the time Australia's largest shopping centre, and remained for many years the flagship property in Lendlease's portfolio. It was also one of Sydney's first major shopping centres. Bankstown Central featured David Jones, Big W department store, Woolworths, Nock & Kirby and 100 stores. The development of the shopping centre was a moment of significance in the development of Bankstown as a satellite centre of south-western Sydney. Not only did it bring major retailers such as David Jones, the premium department store, to the area for the first time, it also became a centre of community and governmental service provision for south-western Sydney.

The centre was located adjacent the Waltons store which opened in 1961 and was taken over by Venture and Norman Ross in 1987 until its closure in 1993. The space vacated by Venture and Norman Ross became World 4 Kids in 1993 and operated until its closure in 2002. The World 4 Kids Space was replaced by JB Hi-Fi, Roni's and seven other stores on the ground level and Target on the upper level.

In 2002, the centre was owned 50-50 by the General Property Trust (GPT) and the Government Superannuation Office (GSO). In October 2002, GPT divested its 50% interest in Bankstown Square to Centro Properties Group for $176 million, the remaining 50% share was sold to another Centro vehicle in 2003. The shopping centre was renamed Centro Bankstown.

Centro Bankstown underwent a two-stage major redevelopment program which was completed in mid-2008.

In July 2006, the stage 1 extension to the complex to a block of land opposite Lady Cutler Avenue was completed adding 26,000 m^{2} of retail space and bringing the total gross leasable area to 66,500 m^{2}. It features a new Woolworths, the largest Big W in New South Wales, as well as 28 additional speciality stores. Franklins moved to the old Woolworths premises in December 2006, and a new mall featuring twenty new stores opened in November 2007 where it was once located. The new mall connects the Grand Market fresh food area with the food court. During this development some stores closed down including JB Hi-Fi and Tandy Electronics, while others relocated including Best & Less to the old space vacated by JB-Hi-Fi.

In July 2007 David Jones closed down after the 40-year lease of the store was up because the area did not fit their demographics, making the store unprofitable and therefore stage 2 of redevelopment had commenced. Myer opened on 17 May 2008, on the site of the old David Jones store. This is similar to the swap that happened at Westfield Eastgardens and Westfield Burwood, the latter in a reverse direction with David Jones replaced a Myer store. The Bankstown Myer store stocks more than the old David Jones store and is the largest store at Bankstown at 10,150m². Stage 2 development also added new stores including National Australia Bank branch located next to the Roads & Traffic Authority.

Centro Properties Group was restructured in 2011 due to financial difficulty and accounting irregularities. The successor entity, Federation Limited, rebranded the centre to Bankstown Central in 2013.

Target decided not to renew its lease and closed the Bankstown store in January 2022, Supa IGA also left the centre the same time.

== Future ==
Vicinity Centres is planning $2 billion redevelopment of Bankstown Central as part of the 2050 Bankstown vision. The redevelopment includes building apartments, office buildings and a hotel over the shopping centre and creating an additional 300,000 square metres of new space. The new space will create a new 'Eat Street' with cafes and restaurants, landscaped open space and a new repositioned bus interchange in The Mall. The first stage, known as 'Bankstown Exchange', is expected to be delivered from 2025.

== Tenants ==
Bankstown Central has 86,306m² of floor space. The major retailers include Myer, Big W, Kmart, Woolworths, Uniqlo, JB Hi-Fi, Rebel and Funland. Coles opened in late 2022, replacing the space that Supa IGA vacated from.

== Transport ==
Bankstown station is a short walk from the centre. The T6 Lidcombe & Bankstown Line currently serves the station, as does the Metro North West & Bankstown Line.

Bankstown Central has bus connections to Greater Western Sydney, Inner West, St George, Sutherland Shire, as well as local surrounding suburbs. It is served by Transit Systems and U-Go Mobility. The majority of its bus services are operated from the bus interchange at the eastern end of The Mall.

Bankstown Central also has multi-level car parks with 3,224 spaces.

== Incident ==
On 29 April 2016, a shooting incident occurred on a rooftop carpark of Bankstown Central just before midday. One person was shot dead and two others were injured. The shooting was a targeted and payback attack and the incident could be connected with a fatal shooting in Condell Park earlier in April. The carpark was closed after the incident and the centre continued trading as normal.
