= Stan Perron =

Australian businessman & philanthropist (1922-2018)

Stan Perron AC
- Born: Lloyd Stanley Perron; 2 November 1922; Perth, Western Australia
- Died: 23 November 2018 (aged 96); Perth, Western Australia
- Occupations: Property development; retail; mining investment
- Spouses: first wife (dec.); Jean Perron
- Children: 3

Lloyd Stanley Perron AC (2 November 1922 – 23 November 2018) was an Australian businessman and philanthropist.

== Biography ==
Perron left school at the age of 14 to sell hand-carved handkerchief boxes. He did not attend high school.

He started his business career by running a fleet of taxis in Perth in 1944. He then built ice-skating rinks. In 1959, he invested £500 in the Pilbara with Lang Hancock and Peter Wright, entitling him to 15 per cent of any future royalties. He later received millions in royalties from iron ore and tantalite found in Brockman 2 mine close to Tom Price, Western Australia by Rio Tinto. In 2012, Gina Rinehart was forced to give him tens of millions of Australian dollars as a result of a trial at the Supreme Court of Western Australia.

With his brother Keith, Perron founded Perron Brothers, a trucking and earthmoving business, which they sold to Thiess in 1961. He bought a Toyota franchise with David Golding. He later invested in real estate along the Great Eastern Highway. He owned half of the Central Park skyscraper in Perth and eight shopping centres in Australia. In May 2012, he purchased fifty per cent stakes in Perth's Centro Galleria, Centro The Glen in Melbourne and Centro Colonnades in Adelaide from the Centro Properties Group. His Perron Group is headquartered in East Perth. He also owned SP Investments.

== Personal life ==
Perron was married to Jean Perron, and they had three children and seven grandchildren. He enjoyed fishing in the ocean. In 1995 Perron was appointed a Member of the Order of Australia "for service to business and commerce and to the community".

Perron died aged 96 in Perth on 23 November 2018. He was posthumously appointed a Companion of the Order of Australia in the 2019 Australia Day Honours in recognition for his eminent service to the community through philanthropic contributions to a range of charitable organisations, and to the commercial property sector.

=== Personal wealth ===
In 2018, the Australian Financial Review assessed Perron's net worth as A$3.99 billion, listed on the Financial Review Rich List. Prior to his death, Perron was one of seventeen living individuals listed on every BRW Rich 200 (or its replacement, the Financial Review Rich List) since the first list was published in 1984. Meanwhile in 2015, Forbes assessed his net worth at US$1.60 billion, on the list of Australia's 50 richest people.

Year	Financial Review Rich List		Forbes Australia's 50 Richest	
Year	Rank	Net worth A$ bn	Rank	Net worth US$ bn
2011	18 ▲	1.88 ▲	20 ▼	1.05 ▼
2012	15 ▲	2.05 ▲	15 ▲	1.50 ▲
2013	14 ▲	2.33 ▲	12 ▲	2.10 ▲
2014	11 ▲	2.73 ▲	14 ▼	1.80 ▼
2015	10 ▲	2.65 ▼	16 ▼	1.60 ▼
2016	11 ▼	2.88 ▲		
2017	10 ▲	3.90 ▲		
2018	15 ▲	3.99 ▲		

Legend
Icon	Description
Steady	Has not changed from the previous year
▲	Has increased from the previous year
▼	Has decreased from the previous year

=== Philanthropy ===
In 1978, he established the Stan Perron Charitable Foundation in support of charities for sick and disabled children, and scholarships and awards for university students. He also donated to the Association for the Blind of WA, which has renamed its Centre for Excellence as The Perron Centre.
