= Centro Shopping America Trust =

Investment product

Centro Properties Group
- Type: Public (ASX: CNP)
- Industry: Property Development, Property Management
- Founded: February 18, 1985 (as Jennings Properties Limited)
- Headquarters: Melbourne, Australia
- Area served: Australia; New Zealand; United States
- Key people: Glenn Rufrano (CEO); Mark Wilson (CIO); Graham Terry (COO)
- Products: Centro Retail Trust; Centro Watt Trust; Centro MCS Syndicates; Centro Direct Property Fund; Centro Direct Property Fund International; Centro Wholesale Funds
- Services: Property Development and Management
- Net income: ▼$469.72 million (2006-07)
- Total assets: ▲ A$30.9 billion
- Number of employees: ~ 900+ (within Australia)
- Website: www.centro.com.au

Centro Shopping America Trust (formally Galileo Shopping America Trust) is an investment product part of Centro Properties Group that acquires shopping centers all around the United States. It was acquired by Centro Properties Group in May 2007 from Galileo Property Trust Group (ASX: CSF). In October 2007, Centro Shopping America Trust successfully merged with Centro Retail Trust (CER) and was subsequently delisted from the Australian Securities Exchange. Centro Retail Trust is an Australian Securities Exchange (“ASX”) Listed Property Trust managed by Centro Properties Group (“Centro”). Listed in August 2005, CER offers investors an income return with exposure to quality Australian, New Zealand and United States of America shopping centres. Centro Retail Trusts's portfolio is valued at approximately $8.31 billion (2007). Centro Retail's investment philosophy is to provide investors with access to pure retail property ownership.
