= Morley, Western Australia =

Morley
- Suburb
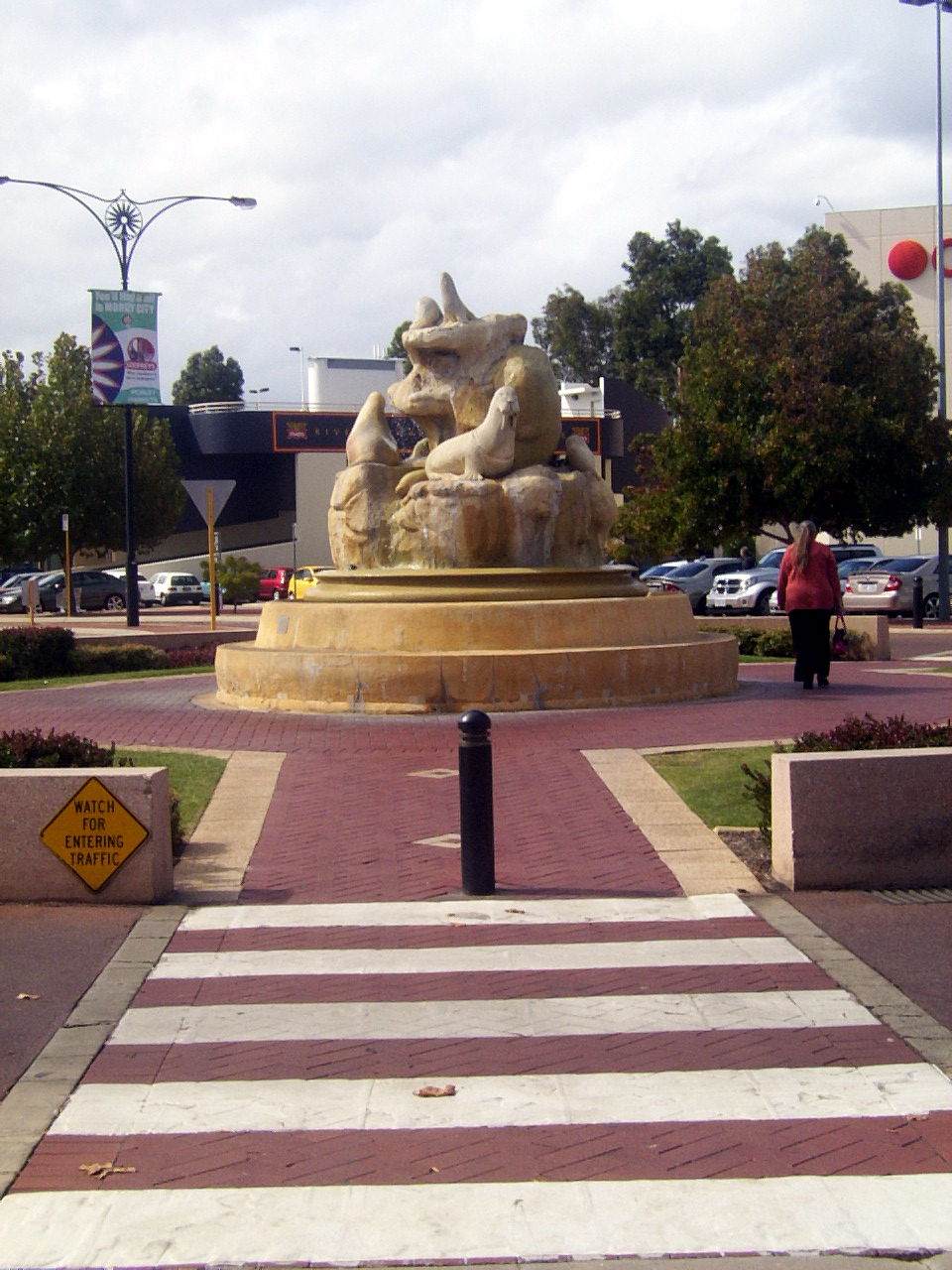
- Bishop Street, Morley
- Interactive map of Morley
- Coordinates: 31.887°S 115.907°E
- Country: Australia
- State: Western Australia
- City: Perth
- LGA: City of Bayswater
- Location: 10 km (6.2 mi) from the Perth CBD
- Established: 1918

Government
  - State electorate: Morley, Bassendean, Maylands
  - Federal division: Perth, Cowan

Area
  - Total: 10.5 km^{2} (4.1 sq mi)

Population
  - Total: 22,539 (SAL 2021)
- Postcode: 6062
Suburbs around Morley
Tuart Hill	Noranda	Beechboro
Dianella	Morley	Kiara
Bedford	Embleton	Bayswater

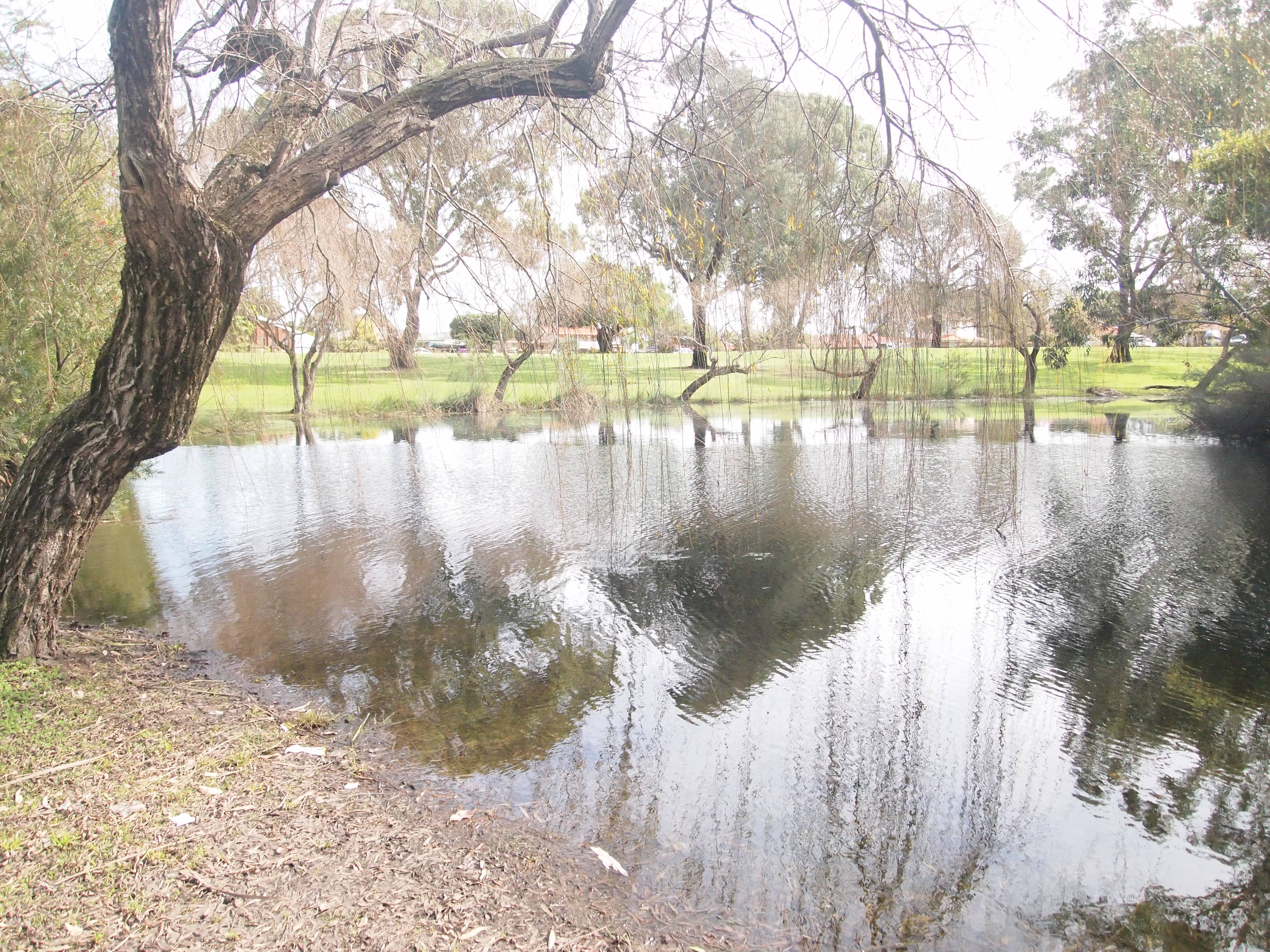
Nora Hughes Park

Morley is a suburb of Perth, within the City of Bayswater local government area, situated approximately 10 kilometres (6 mi) northeast of the Perth central business district. It contains the Galleria Shopping Centre, one of Perth's larger shopping centres. Galleria bus station is located in the car park of the shopping centre. From the late 1950s, Morley (originally known as Morley Park) began to develop as a major shopping and commercial centre.

The name Morley began appearing on maps around the beginning of the twentieth century and was adopted when the Morley Park Estate was subdivided for urban development after the First World War. The most likely explanation for its use is that it commemorates Charles William Morley, who is known to have farmed in the area during the 1860s and 1870s.

== History ==
The Morley area was in the early days of the Swan River Colony developed with agriculture. The area was originally known as Morley Park. In 1929 a landowner progress association petitioned the Bayswater Road Board for improved roads and lighting for improved transport of produce to markets.

Commercial icons appeared in the late 1950s and early 1960s, including the Wirrina Drive-In, the Morley Park Hotel and the Boans department store. Parallel with the commercial growth, a settlement program resulted in the residential development of Morley. This was achieved through a series of town planning schemes undertaken by Margaret Feilman, the consultant town planner to the Shire of Bayswater. These schemes especially catered to the needs of the home building companies whose style of large scale development was a new phenomenon of the 1960s.

Tonkin Highway was constructed through Morley in 1984, bisecting the suburb.

After Boans burnt down in 1986, the Galleria Shopping Centre was built, opening in 1994.

In 2015 the City of Bayswater adopted an activity centre plan for the improvement of the Morley commercial precinct. It aims to build upon the strengths already present in the City Centre and promote an improved street interface with the Galleria Shopping Centre; Progress Street as the Centre's Main Street; and an enhanced Galleria bus station.

In 2019, the last overseas Blockbuster store in Morley closed down, leaving only one remaining location in Bend, Oregon.

On 3 September 2025, a fire occurred at Morley Markets, destroying it completely. Authorities initially believed the fire to be deliberate, but later backtracked, deeming it 'non-suspicious'.

== Facilities ==
Morley Sport and Recreation Centre facilitates various sporting activities, such as indoor soccer, basketball, badminton, netball, roller skating and roller derby. The venue received a $6.7 million redevelopment in 2023.

== Education ==
Primary schools in Morley:

- Hampton Park Primary School (independent public school)
- Infant Jesus Primary School (private catholic school)
- Morley Primary School (independent public school)
- Weld Square Primary School (public school)

High schools in Morley:

- Hampton Senior High School (independent public school)
- John Forrest Secondary College (independent public school)

Morley Senior High School is located in the nearby suburb of Noranda.

== Transport ==
=== Bus ===
==== Bus Stations ====
- Galleria Bus Station

==== Bus Routes ====
- 20 Galleria Bus Station to Mount Lawley (Bradford Street) – serves Russell Street, Walter Road and Wellington Road
- 40 Galleria Bus Station to Elizabeth Quay Bus Station – serves Russell Street, Walter Road, Crimea Street and Johnsmith Street
- 351 Galleria Bus Station to Ballajura Station – serves Crimea Street
- 352 Galleria Bus Station to Morley Station – serves Wheeler Street, Timms Place, McGilvray Avenue, Emberson Road, and Bath Road
- 353 Galleria Bus Station to Ballajura Station – serves Broun Avenue, Morley Station, and Beechboro Road North
- 354 Galleria Bus Station to Ballajura Station – serves Broun Avenue and Morley Station, and Wheatstone Drive
- 355 Galleria Bus Station to Whiteman Park Station – serves Russell Street and Broun Avenue
- 356 Galleria Bus Station to Ballajura Station – serves Broun Avenue, Morley Station and Walter Road East
- 361 Galleria Bus Station to Alexander Heights Shopping Centre – serves Russell Street, Walter Road, Bath Road, Emberson Road
- 950 Morley Station to Queen Elizabeth II Medical Centre (high frequency) – serves Walter Road West, Russell Street and Broun Avenue
- 950X Morley Station to Queen Elizabeth II Medical Centre (high frequency, limited stops) - serves Walter Road West, Russell Street and Broun Avenue
- 975 Bayswater Station to Warwick Station (high frequency) – serves Russell Street, Walter Road, Wellington Road, Camboon Road and Wolseley Road
- 980 Galleria Bus Station to Elizabeth Quay Bus Station (high frequency) – serves Russell Street and Walter Road
- 998 Fremantle Station to Fremantle Station (limited stops) – CircleRoute Clockwise, serves Walter Road, Russell Street, Galleria Bus Station and Rudloc Road
- 999 Fremantle Station to Fremantle Station (limited stops) – CircleRoute Anti-Clockwise, serves Rudloc Road, Galleria Bus Station and Russell Street

=== Rail ===
Ellenbrook Line

- Morley Station
- Noranda Station

== Notable people ==
Australian test cricketer Michael Hussey, singer Samantha Jade and Victorian Bushranger cricketer David Hussey were all raised in Morley.
