= Boans =

Defunct Australian department store

Coordinates: 31.952214°S 115.860012°E

- Industry: Retail
- Founded: 1895; 130 years ago
- Founder: Harry Boan; Benjamin Boan
- Defunct: 1984; 41 years ago
- Fate: Acquired by Myer
- Headquarters: Perth, Western Australia
- Area served: Western Australia

Boans was a department store chain that operated in Western Australia from 1895 until 1984.

== History ==
Harry Boan and his brother Benjamin arrived in Perth in 1895 from Broken Hill. They purchased two 1,000 m^{2} (1/4-acre) blocks facing Wellington Street and Perth railway station, at the edge of a potato swamp. The properties were purchased from WB Woods & Co at a price of £42 per foot, equivalent to A$25,037 per metre in 2022, of street frontage. They borrowed £62,000, equivalent to A$11.3 million in 2022, and within four months, despite acute labour shortages, had built, stocked and opened a single-storey emporium on the site and named it Boan Bros. The store opened on 7 November 1895, and almost sold out by the end of the first day of trading.

In 1901, Benjamin died and Harry assumed sole ownership. Harry purchased adjoining land that spanned the block between Wellington and Murray streets, near Forrest Place. The business was restructured to become a limited company in 1912 as Boans Limited. In the same year, the original buildings were demolished and rebuilt as a single building between Wellington and Murray streets.

Over time, the store became the largest private employer in Western Australia.

In late 1929 Harry Boan handed control of the Boans store to his son Frank Boan who had been living in England with his mother since 1913.

Like similar businesses, Boans had a mail order catalogue issued from the late 1930s that continued into the 1950s.

The Boans department store in Wellington Street was subject to a major fire in 1979, which closed the store for some weeks. The store reopened, prior to its closure in 1986, after it was sold to Coles Myer to make way for Forrest Chase.

In January 1984, Myer launched a takeover offer. It was successful depite a counter offer from Parry Corporation. Myer sold the regional stores in Albany, Bunbury and Geraldton to Geoffrey Bingemann in a management buyout. Bingemann who was a director of Boans prior to the Myer acquisition.

Bingemann rebranded these stores as Stirlings, and operated this business as a regional chain until 1996, when Harris Scarfe acquired the business and they became Harris Scarfe stores. Harris Scarfe continued trading until 2001.

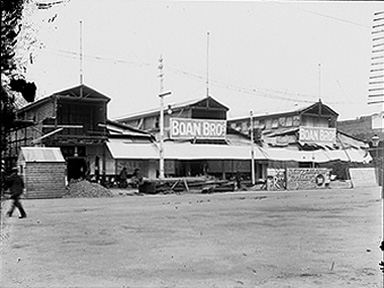
Boans, Wellington Street, Perth store, c. 1900–1910

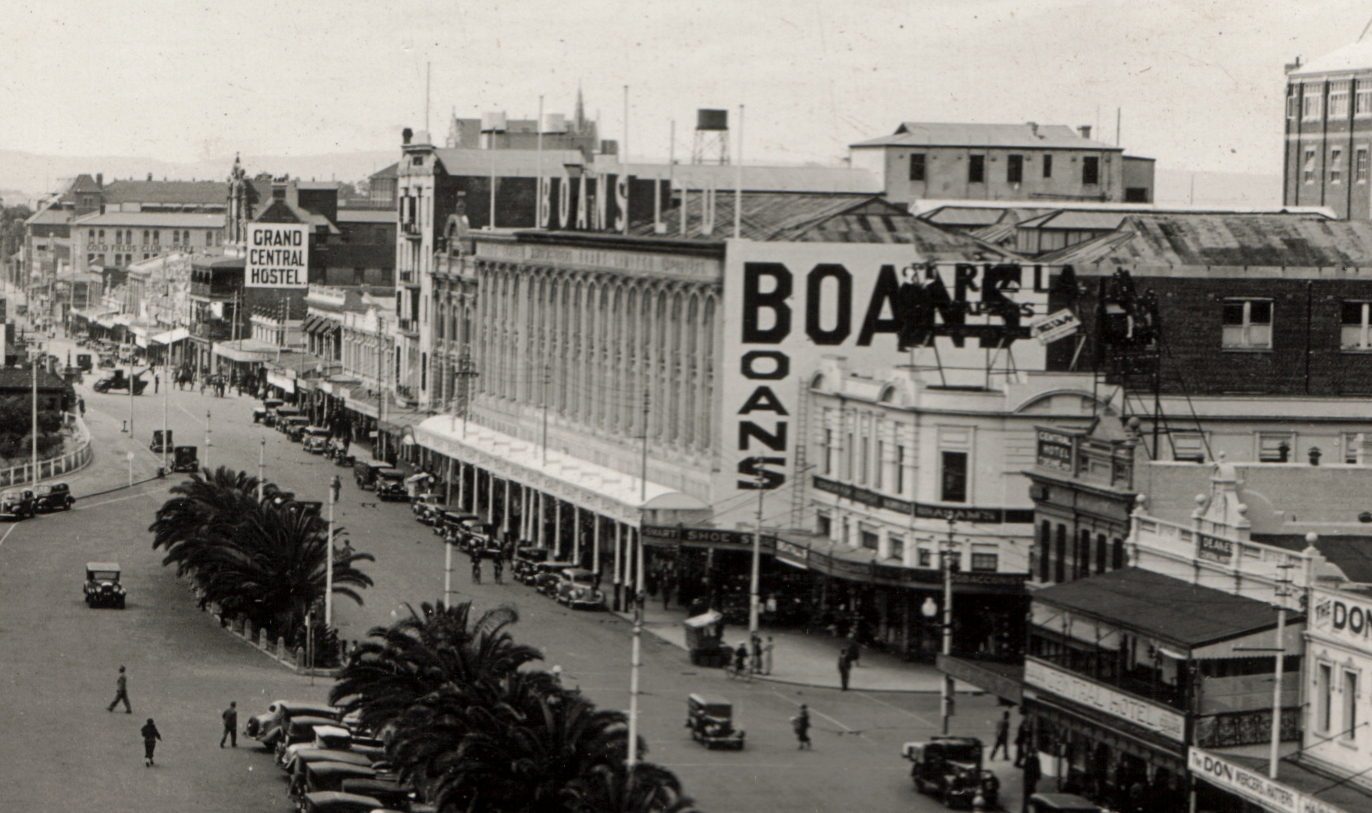
The Boans Building in Wellington Street in 1936

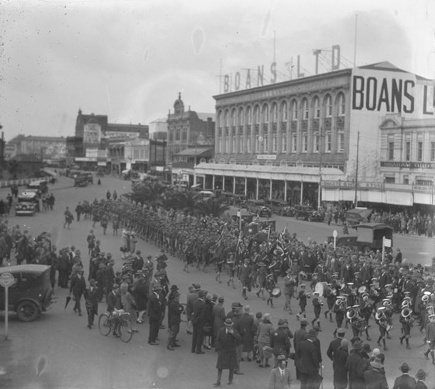
Boans, c. 1938

== Furniture factory ==
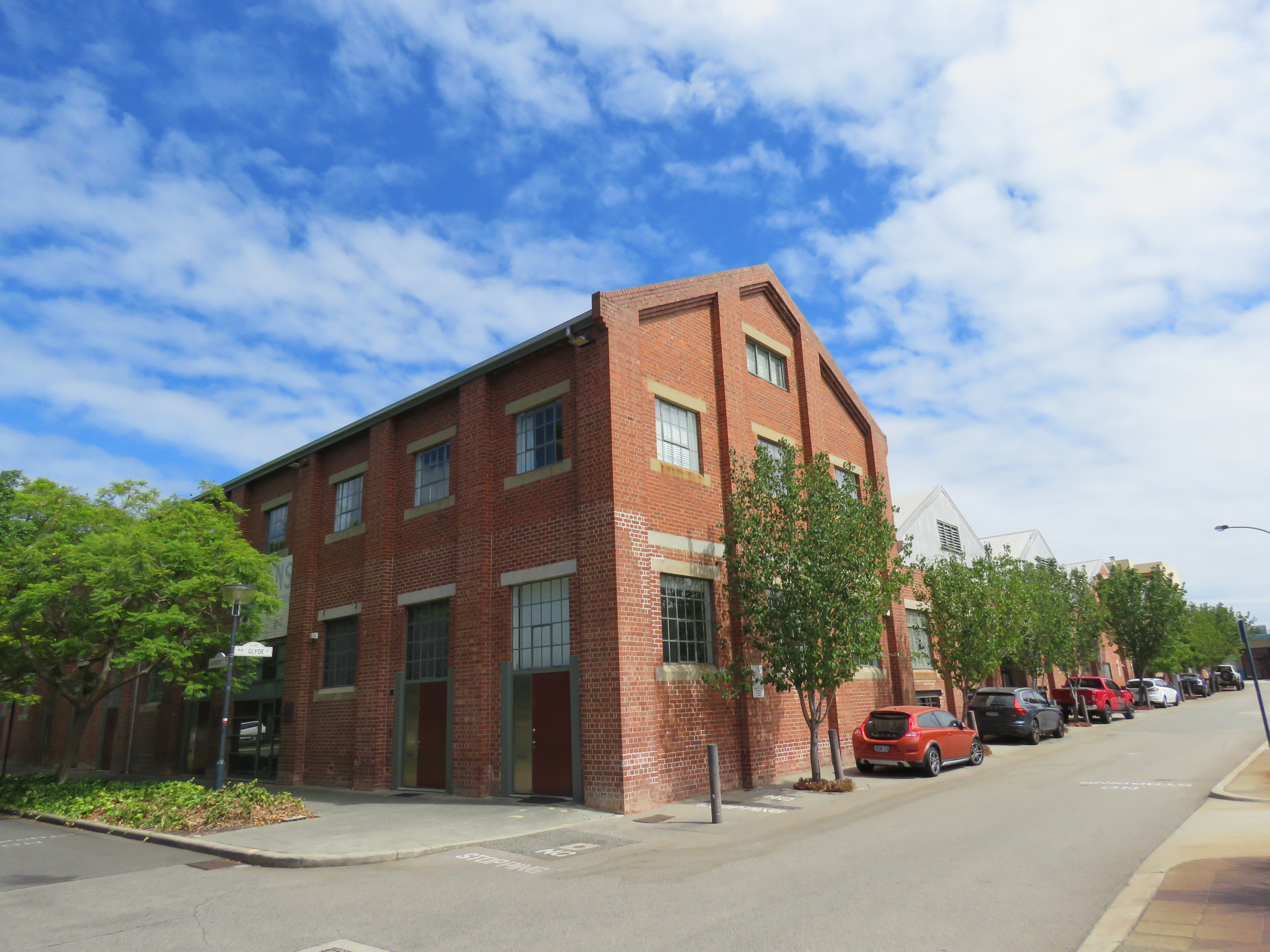
Boans Furniture Factory in January 2021

In about 1910 Boans opened a furniture factory in East Perth to service the shop. It produced bedroom furniture, including mattresses, dining and kitchen furniture. There was also a cane-ware and upholstery section. Imported furniture was also held there.

After World War II, the factory would also house a bakery and butchery, where smallgoods were manufactured. Between 30 and 40 vehicles operated out of the receivals and despatch section, which also included garaging and mechanical services.

After the Perth store closed, the building fell into disrepair for some years, but in 1996 was assessed by the Heritage Council of Western Australia as having historic, aesthetic and social value. As part of the redevelopment of the area by the East Perth Redevelopment Authority, the buildings have now been transformed into upmarket housing and office accommodation.

The site is bounded by Brown, Glyde and Saunders Streets, and the building retains the name of Boans painted on its exterior.

== Suburban stores ==
During the latter part of the twentieth century, the company expanded by opening a number of suburban stores. These included:

- Waverley in Cannington, the first suburban branch
- Morley. Opened 1961, destroyed by a fire in 1986. The site has since been redeveloped as the Galleria.
- Warwick
- Innaloo
- Garden City in Booragoon
- Peppermint Grove. This store site was later acquired by Harris Scarfe in 1996 and was the foundation Harris Scarfe department store in Western Australia. The store continued trading as a Harris Scarfe store until 2001
- Melville Plaza on the Canning Highway
- Medina Shopping Centre, then Kwinana Hub
- Karrinyup. A Myer store upon opening. Traded as Boans for two years (1986–1988). Relabelled Myer in 1988.
- Fremantle. The Myer store was rebadged as Boans for two years between 1986–1988. Myer had bought out Boans and had intended on using the Boans rather than Myer name on its Western Australia stores. Myer closed this store on 20 January 2013.

== Regional stores ==
Boans operated department stores in Albany, Bunbury and Geraldton.
