= Direct Factory Outlet =

Operator of outlet malls in Australia

Direct Factory Outlet Australia Pty Ltd
- Type: Subsidiary
- Industry: Factory outlets
- Founded: 1997
- Founder: David Goldberger; David Wieland
- Headquarters: Australia
- Number of locations: 9 (2024)
- Area served: Australia
- Parent: Vicinity Centres
- Website: www.dfo.com.au

Direct Factory Outlet (DFO) is a brand of factory outlet shopping centres in Australia. They are large-floor warehouse buildings containing partitioned stores where retail outlets sell excess or previous seasons' stocks at reduced prices. Vicinity Centres have full or partial ownership of seven of the nine shopping centres.

== History ==
Direct Factory Outlet was founded in 1997 by Liberty Oil founders David Goldberger and David Wieland. The first centre was opened at Moorabbin Airport in 1994. Other shareholders were property developer Geoff Porz and former Australian Competition & Consumer Commission chief Graeme Samuel through a blind trust. Valued at A$1.5 billion, in early 2010 the business was put up for sale with a number of retail investment funds expressing interest.

DFO centres have traditionally been located around airports: a side effect of the Airports Act of 1996, the federal government has planning control over the land, meaning state planning legislation can be bypassed by developers. In addition the property developer is able to exploit the cost difference between retail and industrial rents, which gives outlet centre operators a distinct advantage over traditional shopping centres. A survey by The Age in 2007 found that in all three DFO-owned centres, most shops carried at least some full-price, current-season stock, available at normal shopping centres. By 2008 five legal challenges to DFO developments have been made by competing retail developers and the Shopping Centre Council of Australia, all being unsuccessful.

On 16 August 2010, lead bank Suncorp-Metway, along with St George Bank, National Australia Bank and Lloyds Banking Group, issued a notice to parent company Austexx demanding repayment within 24 hours of the A$450 million they are owed. The South Wharf centre was under an A$500 million debt, with work on completing the centre stopped after workers placed bans over non-payment. Parent company Austexx was understood to have had total debts of A$1.2 billion, with the four relatively successful DFO sites used as cross-collateral for bank-funded expansion into five other less successful locations including Canberra, Cairns and Hobart. The group of banks appointed insolvency specialists KordaMentha as advisers, with the entire group facing receivership. Negotiations continued until a deal was struck on 19 August, the four banks extending their funding to allow the South Wharf development to be completed. The ten DFO shopping complexes were then sold off separately to repay the $1 billion owed to the banks. In September 2010, CFS Retail acquired the Essendon, Homesbush and Moorabbin centres and a 50% shareholding in South Bank. All four passed to Vicinity Centres when it merged with CFS Retail. Vicinity would acquire the Brisbane centre in May 2016.

== Locations ==
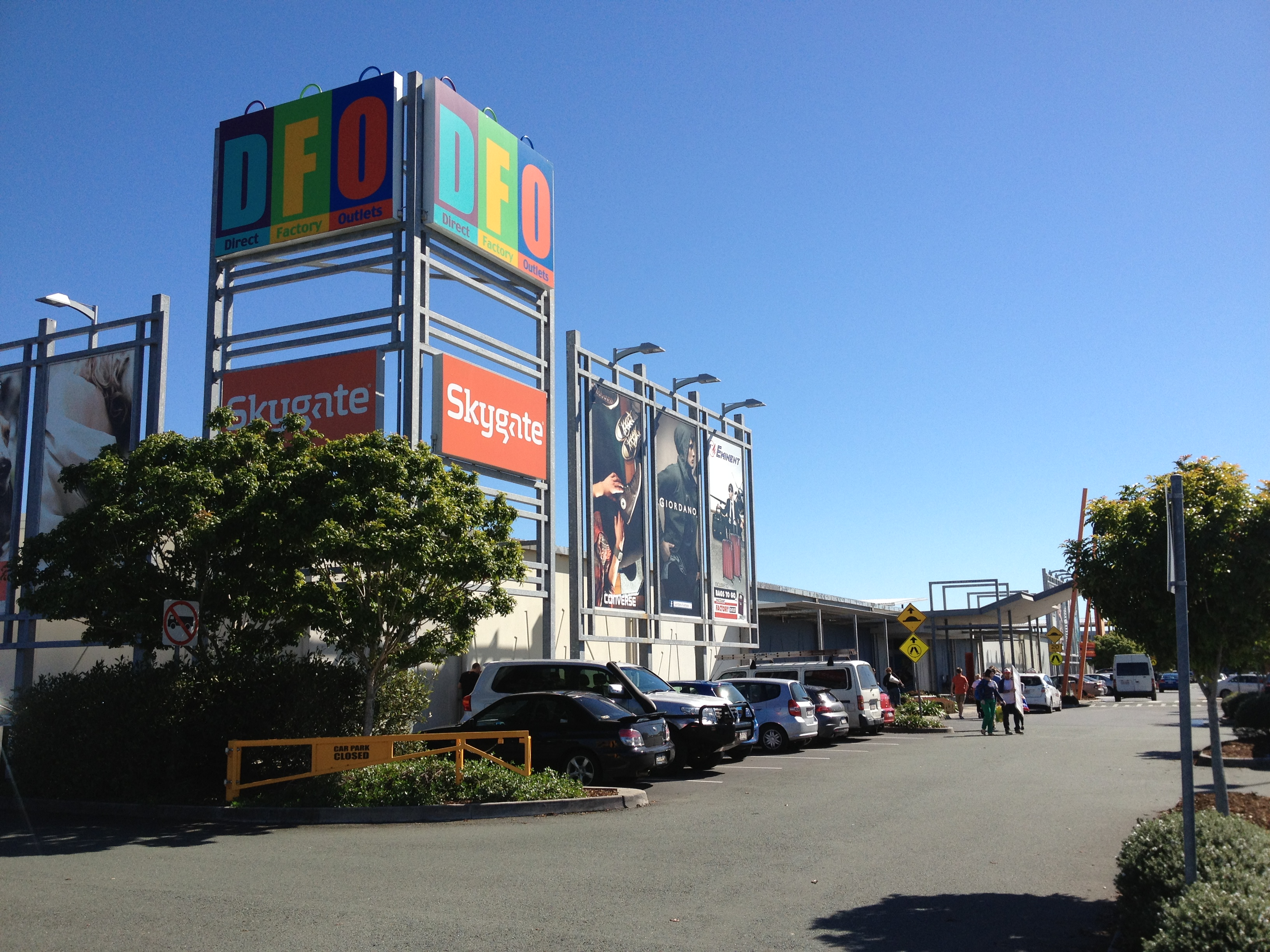
DFO Brisbane at Brisbane Airport in 2013

As of June 2024, there were nine centres located in four states. Vicinity Centres have a 50% shareholding in two of centres, and 100% in another five.

=== Brisbane ===
DFO Brisbane is located at Brisbane Airport, about 13 kilometres (8.1 mi) north-east of the Brisbane central business district. It opened in 2005. As of June 2024, it has 134 tenants on 26,140 square metres (281,400 sq ft) of gross lettable area (GLA). The centre was expanded in 2015, improving its connectivity with the nearby Skygate retail centre. It was acquired by Vicinity Centres in May 2016.

=== Cairns ===
DFO Cairns is located at 274 Mulgrave Road, Westcourt. It is the only Direct Factory Outlet centre north of Brisbane. The centre is 3.7km south west of the Cairns CBD and approximately 8.4km south east of the Cairns Airport. It opened in 2008, as a redevelopment of the former Westcourt shopping plaza. The centre was purchased by Sentinel Property Group for $39.7 million in 2016.

=== Essendon ===
DFO Essendon is in the Melbourne suburb of Essendon Fields, approximately 11 kilometres (6.8 mi) north of the Melbourne central business district. It opened in October 2005. On 21 February 2017, an aeroplane crashed into the centre. A Beechcraft Super King Air on a passenger charter flight bound for King Island, Tasmania crashed shortly after takeoff from nearby Essendon Airport with all five people aboard killed. As the crash occurred before the centre opened for the day, only staff were present, all of whom were accounted for.

=== Homebush ===
DFO Homebush is located in Homebush, about 14 kilometres (8.7 mi) west of the Sydney central business district. It opened in 2002. As of June 2024, it has 123 tenants on 28,226 square metres (303,820 sq ft) of gross lettable area (GLA). A court case ruled against an expansion proposal in 2006, determining that factory outlet centres did not align with state and local planning policies for industrial zones. This decision was supported by Strathfield Council, despite having approved the original development in 2000. The centre underwent a major refurbishment from 2012 through 2014.

=== Jindalee ===
DFO Jindalee is located in the Brisbane suburb of Jindalee. It was constructed in 2007, and was sold by Austexx Group to Chin Yin in 2016 to be managed by Geon Property. It is one of two DFO centres that Vicinity Centres has no ownership in, the other being in Cairns. The centre underwent a major refurbishment from 2019 through 2021. The refurbishment expanded its GLA to 16,485 square metres (177,440 sq ft), and also included a new Reading Cinemas theatre.

=== Moorabbin ===
DFO Moorabbin is in Cheltenham, about 20 kilometres (12 mi) south-east of the Melbourne central business district. Originally Fairways Leisure Market, the centre opened in 1994 on land adjacent to Moorabbin Airport. In 1997 the centre was purchased by the Austexx Group as the group's first DFO shopping centre. The centre had approximately 45 stores on 8,000 square metres (86,000 sq ft). Since opening, the centre has expanded to 24,406 square metres (262,700 sq ft).

=== Perth ===
DFO Perth is situated at Perth Airport, approximately 12 kilometres (7.5 mi) east of the Perth central business district. The shopping centre opened on 3 October 2018 with 113 retail outlets and 1,500 parking bays. Vicinity has a 50% shareholding with the remainder owned by Perth Airport Development Group Investments. It has 111 tenants on 23,469 square metres (252,620 sq ft) of GLA.

=== South Wharf ===
DFO South Wharf is located in South Wharf, about 2 kilometres (1.2 mi) south-west of the Melbourne central business district. It opened in 2009, after moving from its previous location on Spencer Street. The former site has since remained an outlet centre, now known as the Spencer Outlet Centre. In April 2019, Vicinity Centres became the sole shareholder after buying out the Plenary Group.

=== Uni Hill ===
DFO Uni Hill is in Bundoora, approximately 16 kilometres (9.9 mi) north-east of the Melbourne central business district. It opened in 2008. Vicinity has a 50% shareholding with the remainder owned by MAB Corporation. Up until Vicinity's acquisition in 2020, the outlet centre was known as Uni Hill Factory Outlets, which formerly operated as 'Brand Junction'.

== Essendon Centre plane crash ==
Just before 9am on 21 February 2017, a Beechcraft Super King Air on a passenger charter flight bound for King Island, Tasmania crashed shortly after takeoff from nearby Essendon Airport. All five people aboard the flight were killed. As the shopping centre had not opened yet, only staff were at the centre, all of whom were accounted for. The incident was the worst aviation accident in Victoria for 30 years.

== See also ==
- Canberra Outlet Centre, a former DFO centre
- The District Docklands
