= 2017 Essendon Airport Beechcraft King Air crash =

Plane crash in Melbourne, Australia

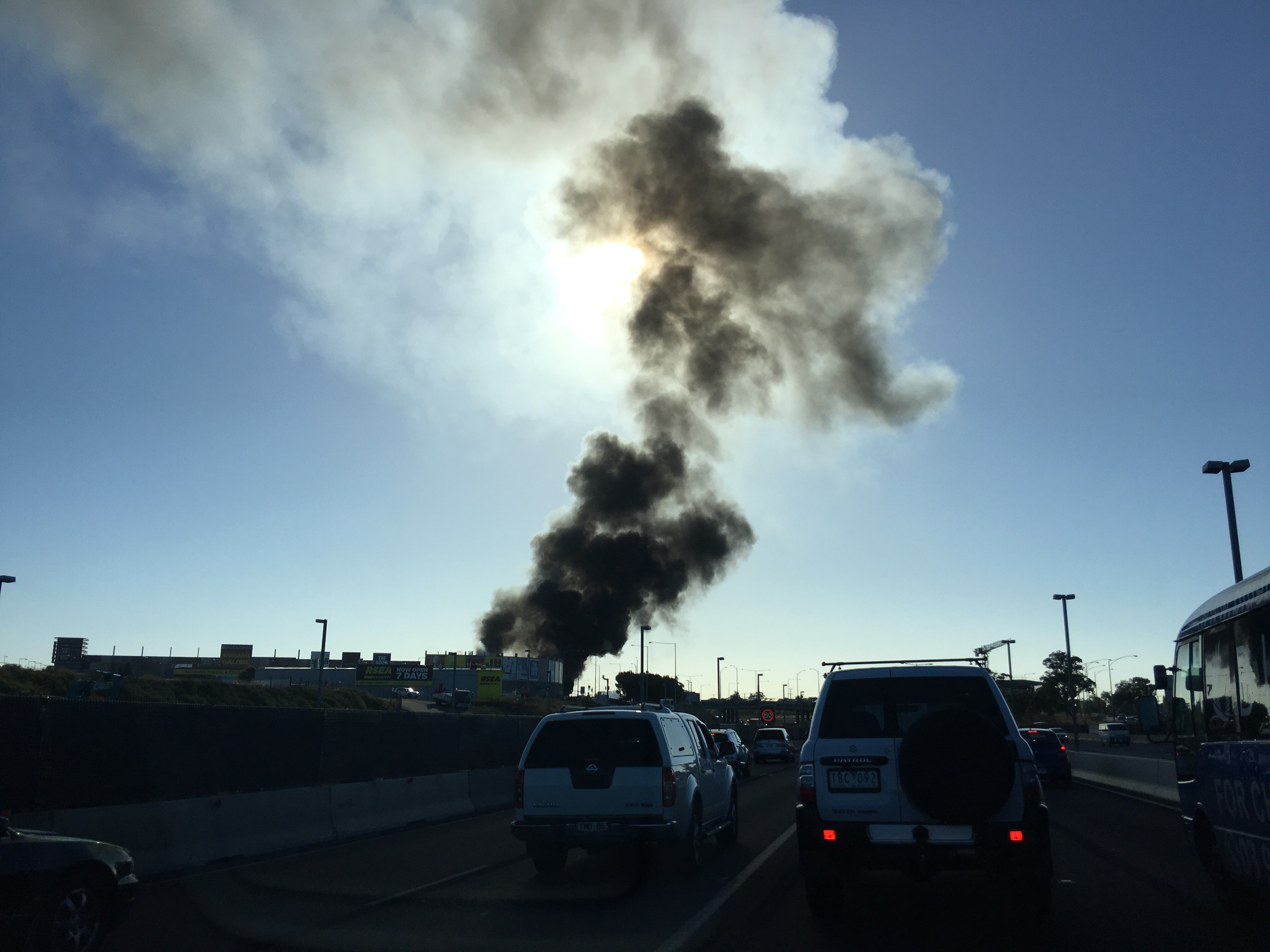
- Smoke rising from the crash site

Accident
- Date: 21 February 2017
- Summary: Loss of control during initial climb
- Site: DFO Essendon shopping complex, Essendon Fields, Victoria, Australia; 37.734423°S 144.904996°E
- Total fatalities: 5
- Total injuries: 2

Aircraft
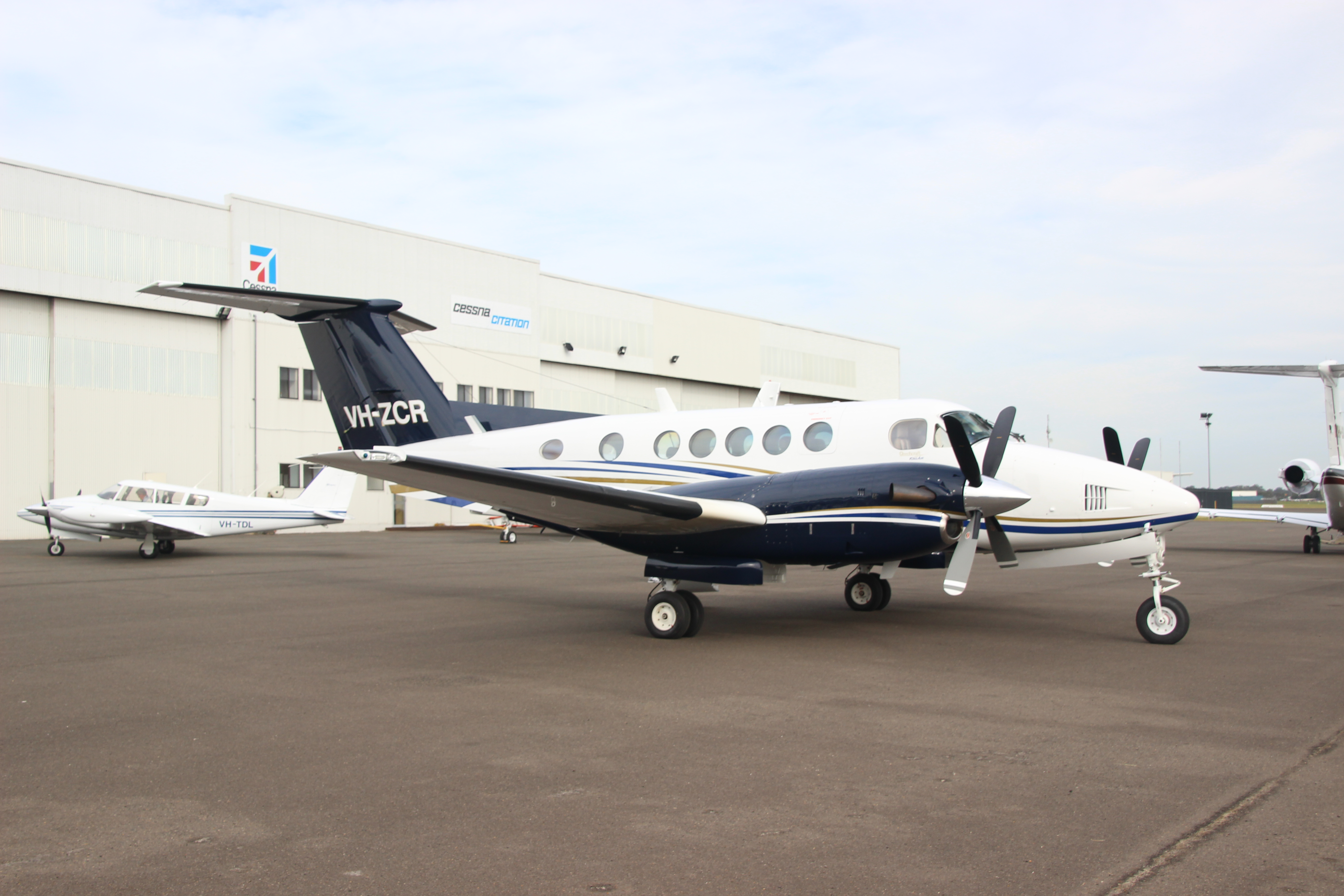
- VH-ZCR, the aircraft involved in the accident, in 2014
- Aircraft type: Beechcraft B200 King Air
- Operator: Corporate and Leisure Charters
- Registration: VH-ZCR
- Flight origin: Essendon Airport, Essendon Fields
- Destination: King Island Airport, King Island, Tasmania
- Occupants: 5
- Passengers: 4
- Crew: 1
- Fatalities: 5
- Survivors: 0

Ground casualties
- Ground injuries: 2

On 21 February 2017, at 8:59 am local time, a Beechcraft B200 King Air aircraft operating a charter flight, carrying a pilot and four passengers bound for King Island, crashed seconds after taking off from Essendon Airport in Melbourne, Australia.

Four American passengers and the Australian pilot died in the crash.

== Accident ==
The pilot made two mayday calls before the aircraft clipped the roof of a building housing the DFO Essendon. The aircraft then impacted the ground a few metres away and ignited, starting a fire. The DFO complex, located on the airport grounds, had not yet begun the day's trading. All five people on board were killed in the crash, including the four passengers who were American tourists on their way to King Island to play golf. Victorian Premier Daniel Andrews said it was the worst civil aviation accident in Victoria in 30 years.

Media sources reported that the aircraft crashed as a result of an engine failure on take-off.

Some local residents and aviation groups have stated that the crash shows buildings have been constructed too close to the airport.

The official investigation's initial findings include that there were no pre-existing aircraft faults, that the pilot made a mayday call, that the voice recorder failed, and that witnesses said the take-off took "longer than normal". Engine tear-downs show that both powerplants were free to rotate and both propellers showed evidence of rotation, although only the left propeller left slash damage to the building roof. Further findings would be made public as the investigation was concluded.

== Aircraft ==
The aircraft was a Beechcraft B200 King Air, serial number BB-1544 and registered as VH-ZCR; it was manufactured in 1996 and had accumulated just under 7,000 hours of service time.

== Aftermath ==
The Executive Director of the Australian branch of the Aircraft Owners and Pilots Association (AOPA) criticised the practice of allowing commercial developments, such as the Essendon DFO complex, at Australian airports, saying these reduced the options available to pilots in emergencies. He stated that AOPA had been calling on governments for two decades to stop such developments. A spokesman for the Australian Federation of Air Pilots also criticised commercial development of land at Essendon Airport. Anti-airport campaigners renewed calls for the airport to be closed.

== Investigation ==
An investigation by the Australian Transport Safety Bureau determined the accident was a result of one of the flight control trim tabs being set incorrectly. Failure of the pilot to realise the rudder trim was set fully to the left caused a longer than normal takeoff and caused the aircraft to slip and yaw to the left once airborne. Ultimately the uncorrected configuration caused a loss of control of the aircraft. The checklist used by the pilot did not contain a specific check for the trim tab position before takeoff. The investigation was hindered by the lack of data from the cockpit voice recorder, which had stopped working on a previous flight. (Note: A typical cockpit voice recorder (CVR) records in a continuous loop, so that it always has a finite amount of recorded sounds (30 minutes to some hours, depending on the type), being the most recent (i.e. the sounds immediately before the CVR stops for any reason). The electrical wire supplying power to the CVR is routed via an 'impact switch', that is activated by a g-force and is typically located near the CVR; the switch functions to interrupt power to the CVR in a crash so that it does not continue to run and erase the sounds leading up to the crash. If the switch is activated in a non-crash situation, it must be reset manually. In the accident aircraft, the sounds recorded were determined to be those of a previous flight six weeks before the crash and did not include any sounds from after the aircraft's landing at the end of that flight. The investigators concluded that the aircraft touched down hard enough when landing to activate the impact switch and it was never reset.) Furthermore, the weight of the aircraft at takeoff exceeded its maximum takeoff weight, but this factor was not determined to be a contributing factor to the crash.

In September 2021, it was reported that the pilot failed a proficiency test two years prior to the crash.
