= Colonnades Shopping Centre =

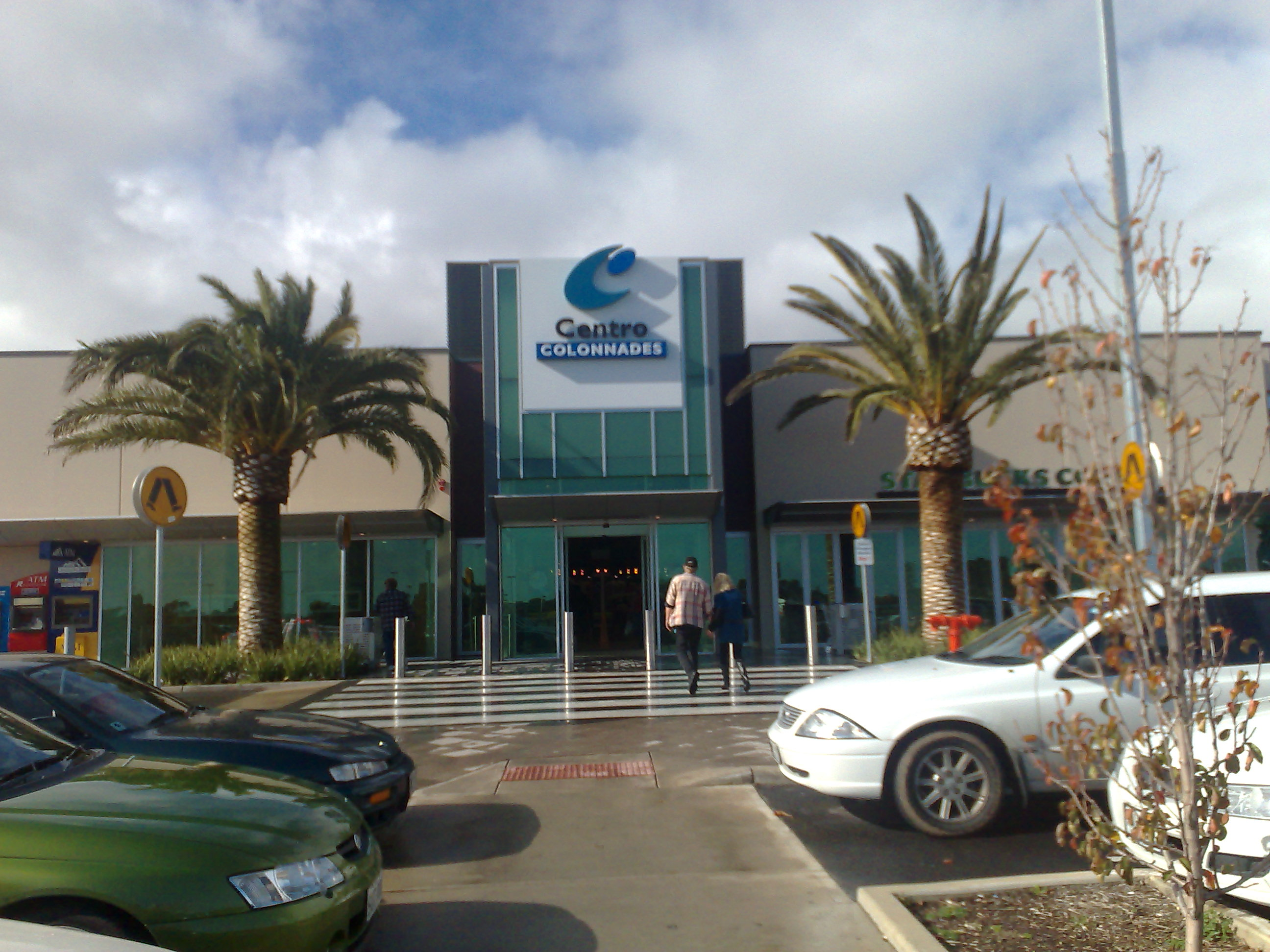
- Entrance to Colonnades Shopping Centre (2007)
- Location: Noarlunga Centre, South Australia
- Coordinates: 35.1421°S 138.4976°E
- Opened: 1979
- Developer: Vicinity Centres
- Manager: Vicinity Centres
- Owner: Nikos Property Group (50%); Vicinity Centres (50%)
- Num. of stores: 203
- Floor area: 88,554 m^{2} (953,190 sq ft)
- Floors: 2
- Parking: 4,100
- Website: www.colonnades.com.au

Colonnades Shopping Centre is a shopping centre in Adelaide, South Australia. It is located in the suburb of Noarlunga Centre, on a large allotment of land with access from Goldsmith Drive, Beach Road and Burgess Road. It is the third-largest shopping centre in Adelaide, behind Westfield Marion and Westfield Tea Tree Plaza, being within the top-50 largest in Australia.

== History ==
Colonnades Shopping Centre was built in 1979 and had a wing added to the eastern end of the centre in 2016 which included a Woolworths supermarket. Colonnades Shopping Centre was acquired by Centro in 2003, and underwent a $125 million expansion, which has seen the building of a larger Woolworths, and the addition of a Big W among many other shops. The new wing also added a number of speciality shops to the expanded area. The centre contains three supermarkets, two department stores and approximately 200 other specialty stores alongside a food court.

In 2012, a 50% shareholding was sold to the Perron Group. In 2020, Myer closed its doors.

The shopping centre has laid and connected 5,000 solar panels on its rooftop. The 1.8 megawatts (MW) system is generating renewable power to reduce dependence on the national grid and contribute towards the environment of the local community.

In May 2022, the Perron Group sold its 50% shareholding to Nikos Property Group.

== Transport ==
Colonnades Shopping Centre is serviced by both Noarlunga Centre railway station and Colonnades Interchange, and is the hub for public transport in the outer southern suburbs of Adelaide.

The shopping centre is also serviced by a taxi rank just outside of the centre itself.

== Gallery ==
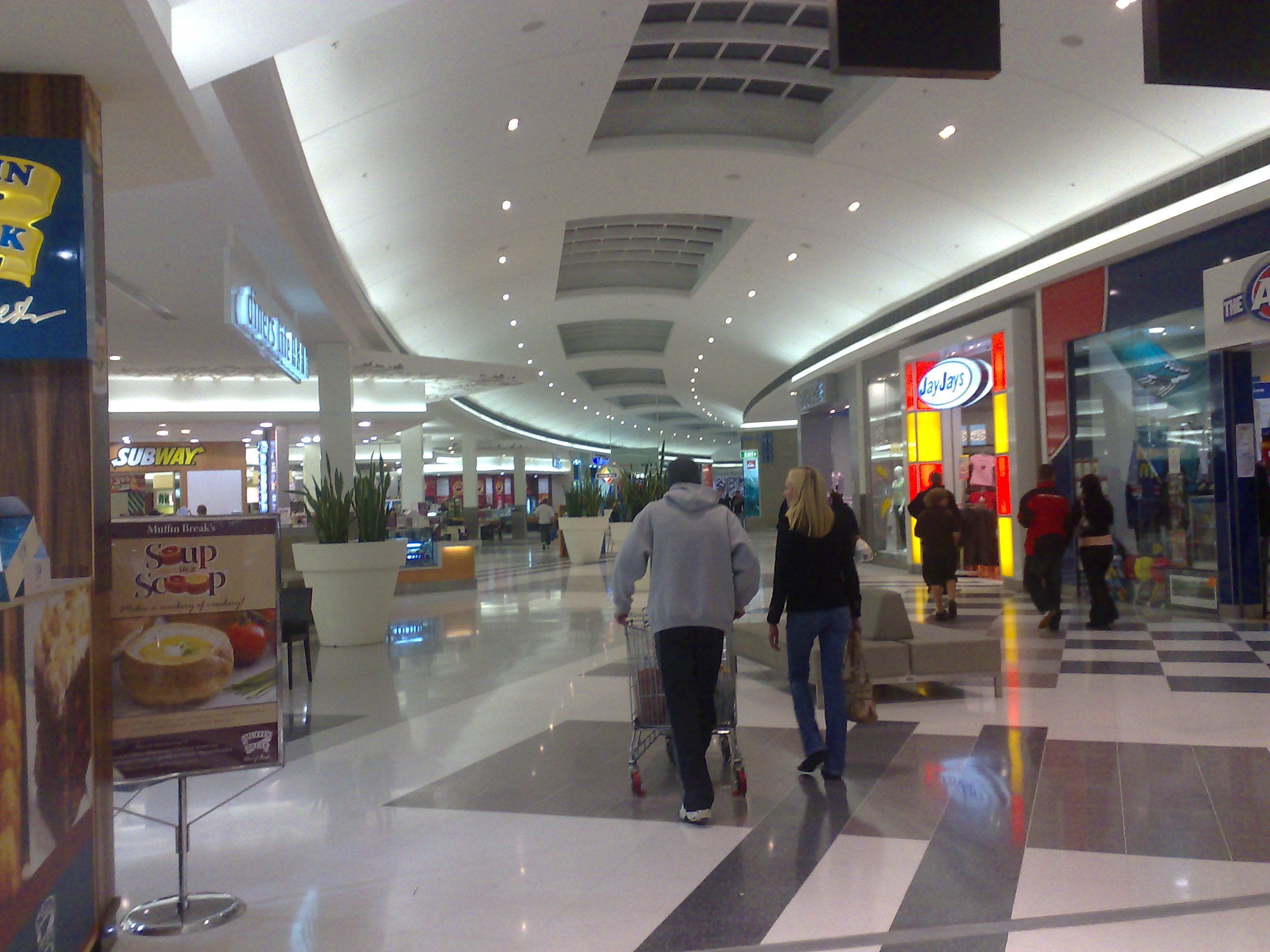
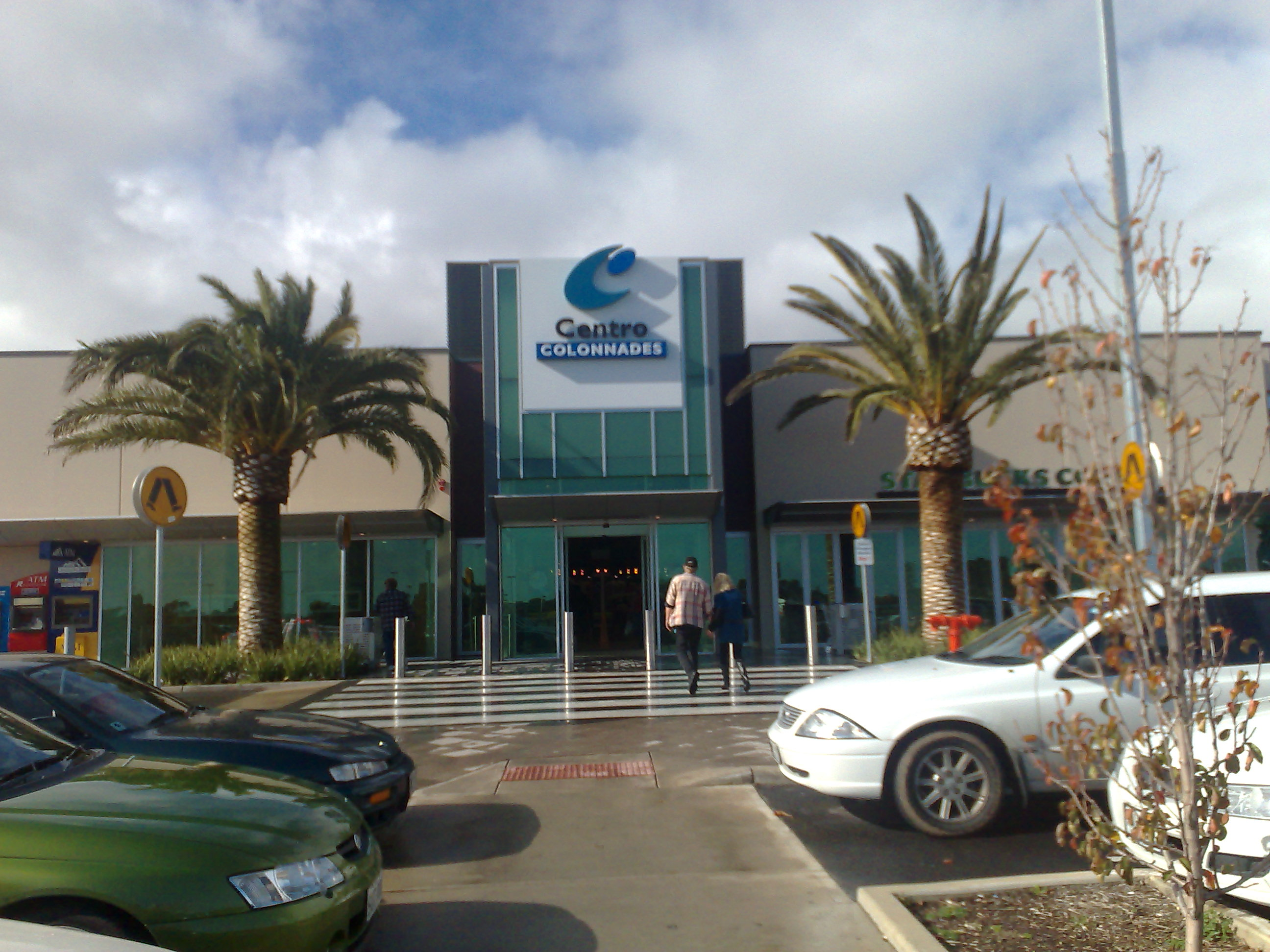
Different views of Colonnades.
