= Vicinity Centres =

REIT company

Vicinity Limited
- Formerly: Federation Centres; Centro Properties; Jennings Properties
- Type: Public
- Traded as: ASX: VCX
- Industry: Property Development; Property Management; Retail Property
- Founded: 18 February 1985
- Founder: Jennings Industries
- Headquarters: Chadstone Shopping Centre, Melbourne, Victoria
- Number of locations: 60 (2021)
- Area served: Australia
- Key people: Peter Huddle (CEO); Trevor Gerber (Chairman)
- Services: Retail property ownership and management
- Revenue: $802 million (2022)
- Net income: $1.2 billion (2022)
- Number of employees: 1,200+
- Website: www.vicinity.com.au

Vicinity Centres ASX: VCX, previously known as Federation Centres and Centro Properties Group, is an Australian Real Estate Investment Trust specialising in the ownership and management of Australian shopping centres. As at December 2021, it had stakes in 60 shopping centres. It is headquartered at Chadstone Shopping Centre in Melbourne.

== History ==
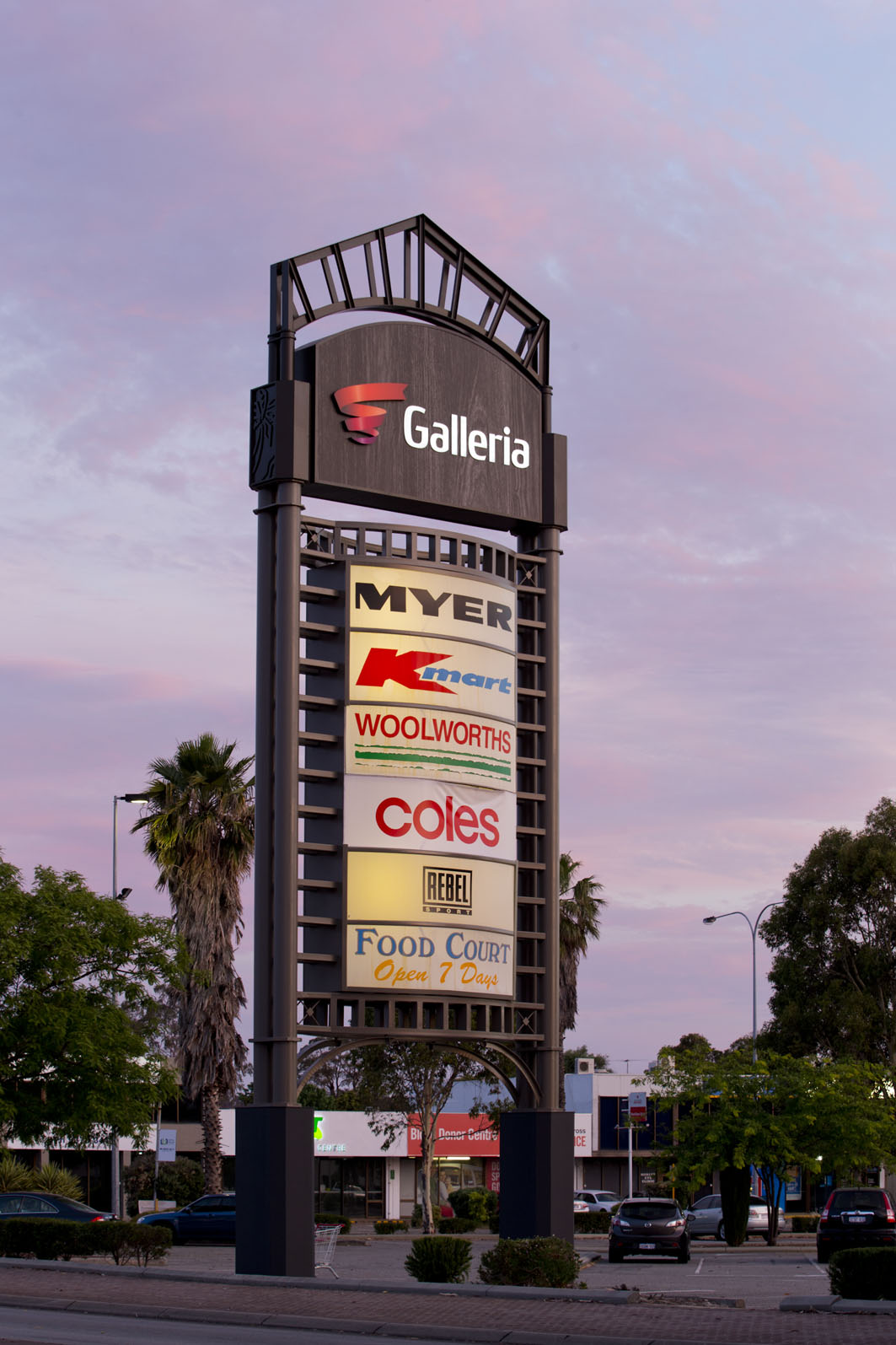
Galleria, Perth

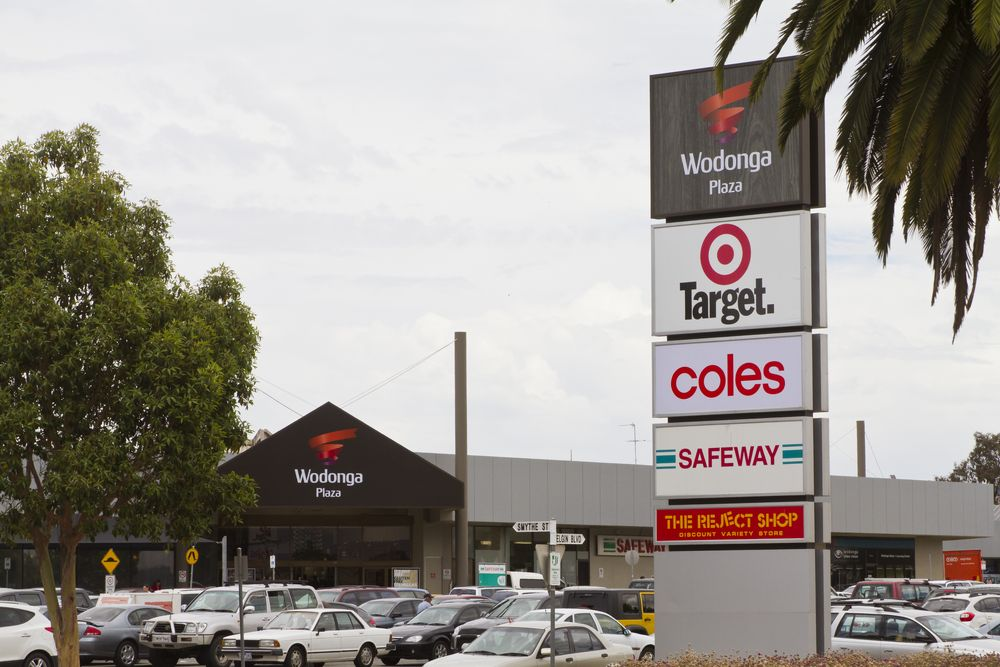
Wodonga Plaza (sold)

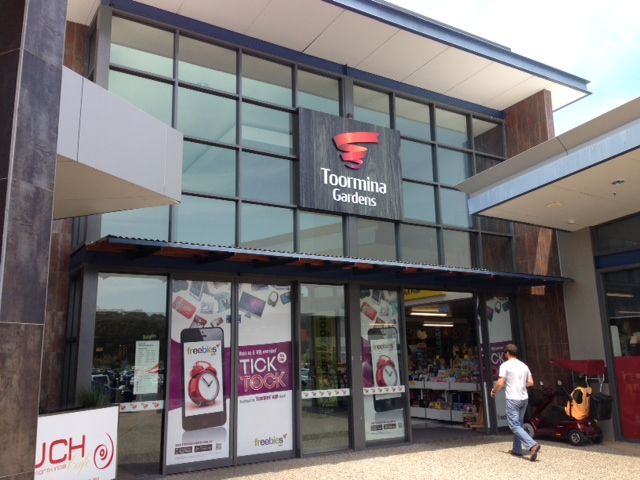
Toormina Gardens (sold)

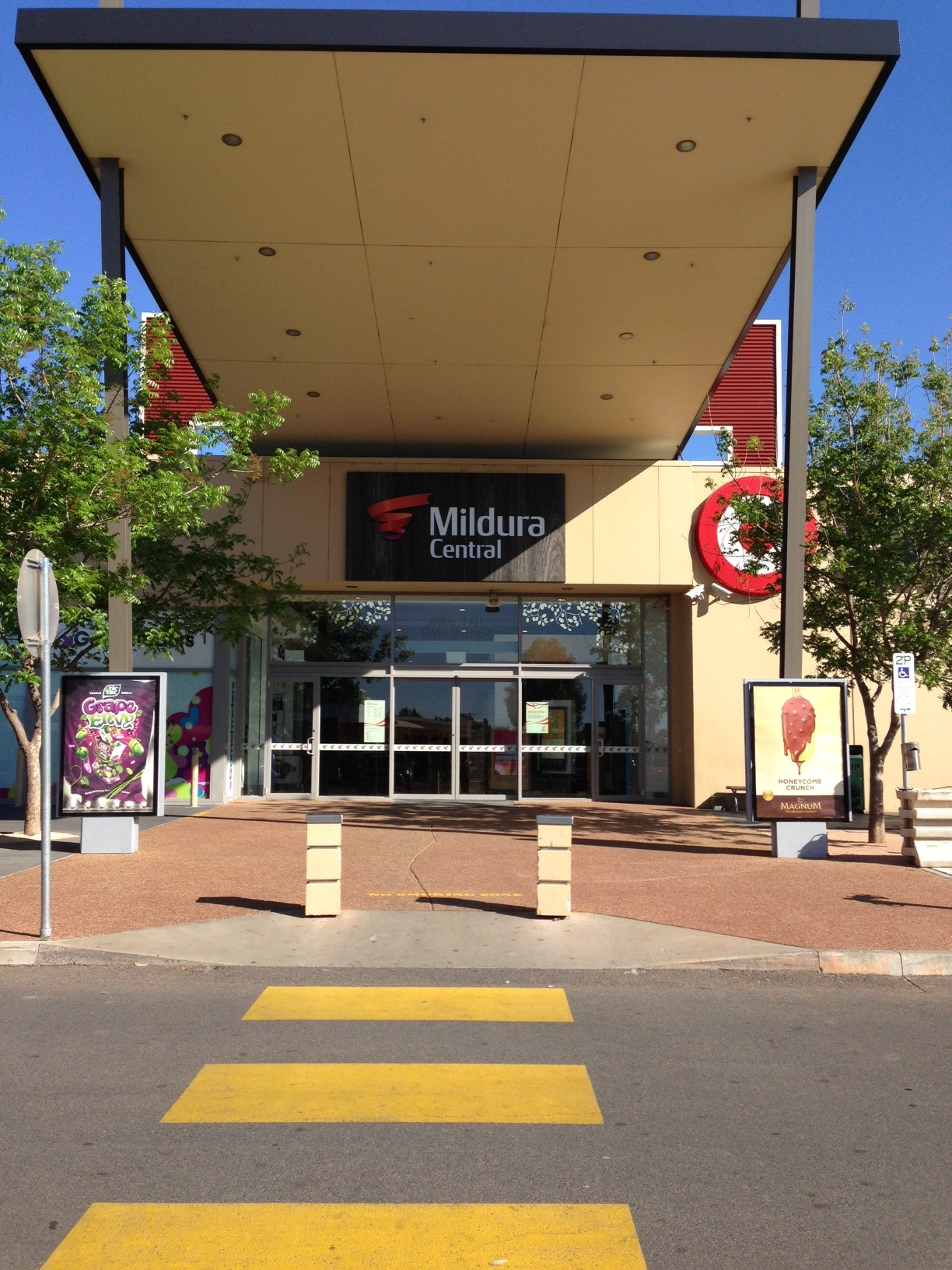
Mildura Central (sold)

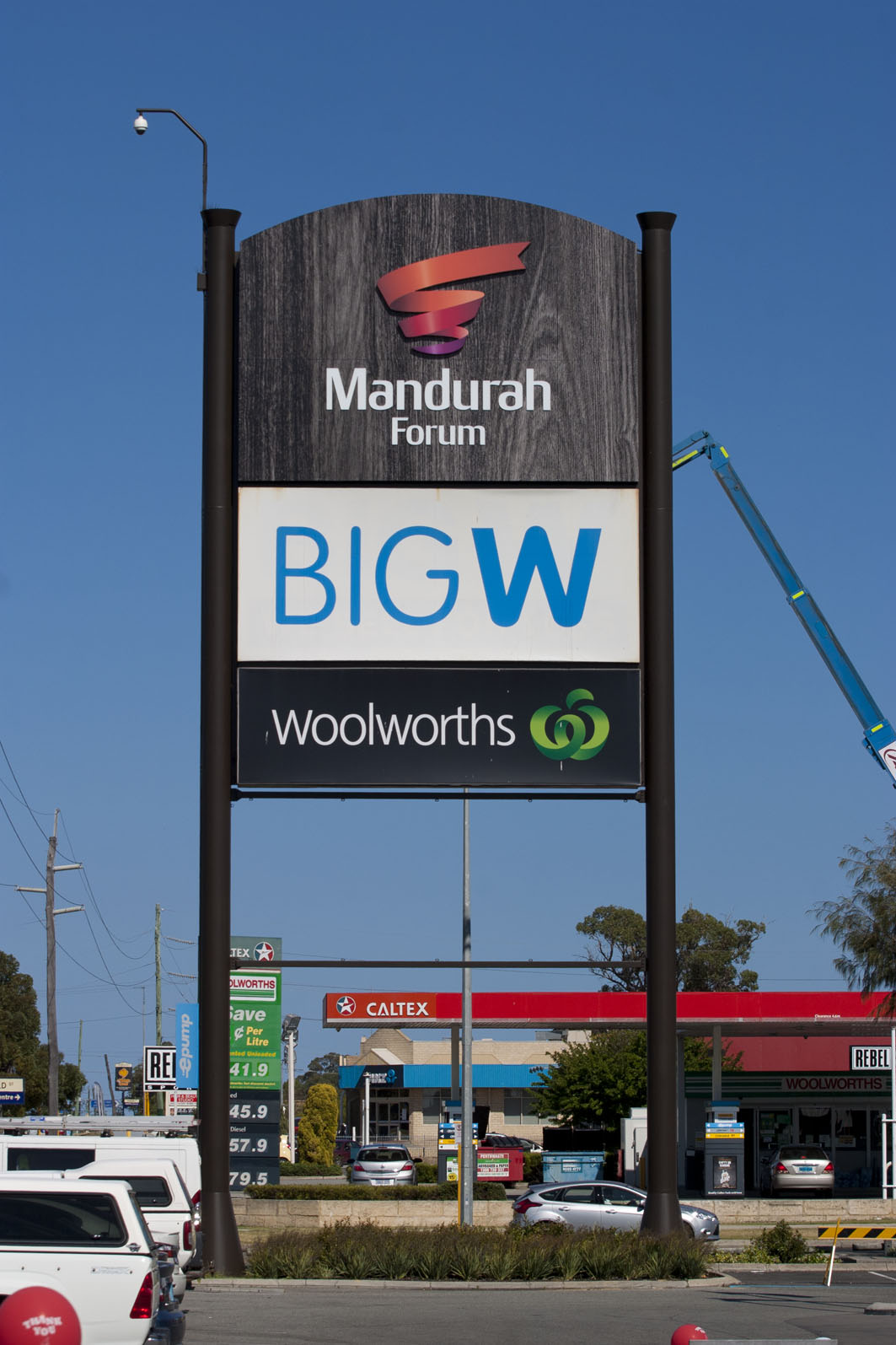
Mandurah Forum

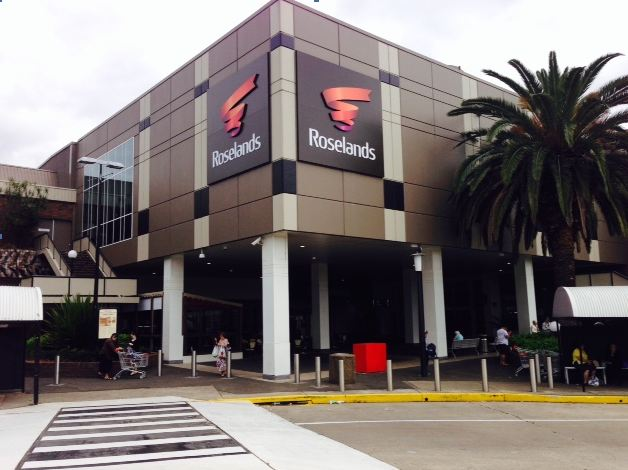
Roselands

Vicinity Limited was established by diversified property construction Jennings Industries on 18 February 1985 as Jennings Properties, and listed on the Australian Securities Exchange. In January 1991, it was renamed Centro Properties. In September 1997, Centro was restructured to become a stapled security structure named Centro Properties Group. Centro was a stapled security comprising one unit in Centro Property Trust (CPT) stapled to one share in Centro Properties Limited (CPL). CPT is the owner of Centro's interests in the properties and CPL, along with its subsidiaries, provides management services to CPT.

In September 1999, Centro acquired the management rights for Prime Retail Property Trust (PRX), and in October 2004, it merged with Prime Retail Group under a court-approved scheme with a ratio of 5 Prime securities per 1 Centro security.

Throughout the 2000s, Centro acquired numerous assets:

- CT Retail Investment Trust (July 2001)
- MCS Syndication Business (July 2003)
- 14 international assets located in California (August 2003)
- Centro launched its first international syndicate, MCS 32 (November 2003)
- Kramont Realty Trust (a listed US REIT) (August 2005) – US$1.6 billion
- Centro Retail Trust was spun off from the main fund (August 2005)
- Seven United States shopping centres from Westfield Group (May 2006)
- Heritage Property Investment Trust (a listed US REIT) (July 2006)
- New Plan Excel Realty Trust (a listed US REIT) (February 2007)
- Galileo Funds Management (May 2007)
- Centro Watt Joint Venture (May 2007)

After entering the United States market in late 2003, Centro acquired, redeveloped and renovated a number of mall properties. On 9 May 2006, Westfield announced the sale of seven United States shopping centres which it deemed to fit outside its strategic plan, which Centro subsequently acquired. Centro was the fifth-largest retail property owner/manager in the United States with 682 properties. The Oakleigh store was one of the largest available. It had over US$10 billion worth of property under management. Its USA corporate operations were primarily in Philadelphia, Pennsylvania and Los Angeles. Centro in the USA is now independently known as Brixmor. Centro has no affiliation with Brixmor. Centro Retail Trust sold its entire USA assets and platform to BRE Retail Holdings an affiliate of Blackstone Real Estate Partners VI, L.P. in 2011.

Between 2003 and 2007, Centro and its managed funds acquired MCS's property syndicate business and substantial portfolios of US convenience shopping centres and operating businesses. On 17 December 2007, Centro announced it was continuing to negotiate the refinancing of A$1.3 billion in maturing facilities, and had obtained an interim extension until 15 February 2008 of all facilities maturing prior to that date. In addition, US joint venture facilities were also similarly extended.

It was speculated that the American-based subprime mortgage meltdown was the cause of a decline in lending and credit market problems. While Centro also announced they would be solvent until at least February 2008, shares in the group underwent a dramatic decline. Applications and withdrawals were suspended from Centro's Direct Property Fund (DPF) and the Centro Direct Property Fund International (DPFI).

The company's difficulties were worsened by the 2008 global credit crunch and by two shareholders' class actions claiming up to $1 billion, while the company was required to refinance loans of $4.5 billion in December 2008.

On 16 January 2009, Centro announced completion with its financiers for a long term refinancing and debt stabilisation agreement. The key features of refinancing and debt stabilisation included:

- A three-year extension on A$3.9 billion of the senior syndicated debt facility.
- A $1.05 billion Hybrid Security.
- Extension of the debt facilities within Super LLC (Centro's US joint venture investment with Centro Retail Trust (CER) and CMCS 40).
- Agreement for the extension of debt facilities for many of Centro's managed funds
- Reduced pressure to sell property assets within Centro and its managed funds.

On 4 November 2010, a process designed to allow CNP (Centro Properties Group) and its managed funds to jointly evaluate these expressions of interest through a formal competitive market process commenced.

On 1 March 2011, CNP and its managed funds announced it's proposed to restructure including:

- US Assets Sale – Centro and its managed funds entered into a binding stock purchase agreement with BRE Retail Holdings, Inc, an affiliate of Blackstone Real Estate Partners VI, L.P. ("Blackstone") to sell all of their US assets and platform for an enterprise value of approximately US$9.4 billion;
- Headstock Debt Restructure – Centro has agreed with holders of approximately 73% of Centro's senior debt ("Senior Lender Group") to progress a creditors scheme of arrangement to effect the cancellation of all Centro's senior debt in consideration for substantially all Centro's Australian assets. The Senior Lender Group has agreed that $100 million would be made available for ordinary security holders and other stakeholders, junior to the senior lenders; and
- Discussions of Australian Funds Amalgamation – Centro has entered into discussions with its senior lenders, Centro Retail Trust (CER), and other Australian managed funds with a view to aggregating their respective portfolios to create a listed fund ("Amalgamated Fund") owning a retail property portfolio of high quality Australian regional and sub-regional shopping centres. Centro's share of the Amalgamated Fund would be distributed to its senior lenders as part of the scheme of arrangement described above.

On 29 June 2011, the sale of the US portfolio was completed. In June 2011, the Federal Court of Australia found that eight executives and directors of Centro breached the Corporations Act by signing off on financial reports that failed to disclose billions of dollars of short-term debt. The legal action was commenced by the Australian Securities & Investments Commission, who sued Andrew Scott (ex-CEO), Brian Healey (former chairman), Paul Cooper (current chairman), Romano Nenna (ex-CFO), former non-executive directors Peter Wilkinson, Sam Kavourakis and Peter Goldie, and Jim Hall, who remains on the board. A class action from investors seeking A$200 million in damages due to alleged deceptive conduct and breaches of continuous disclosure obligations has commenced in the Federal Court against Centro Properties Group, Centro Retail Group, and their auditors, PwC, and relate to conduct from August 2007 to February 2008.

On 22 November 2011, CNP securityholders, Convertible Bondholders, Hybrid Lenders and Senior Lenders, as well as Centro Retail Trust (CER) security holders, voted in favour of the restructure of Centro and its managed funds. The Supreme Court of New South Wales approved the Senior Lenders' and Hybrid Lenders' schemes of arrangement necessary to effect the restructure.

CNP's $2.7 billion Senior Debt, which matured on 15 December 2011, was cancelled in return for transferring all CNP's Australian assets and interests. CNP Security holders, Convertible Bondholders and Hybrid Lenders received their relevant proceeds, allocated as follows:

- 5.03 cents per CNP security or $48,925,082 in total to CNP security holders;
- 5 cents in the dollar or $21,074,918 in total to Convertible Bondholders in exchange for redemption of their convertible bonds; and
- $20,000,000 in total to secured Hybrid Lenders in return for the cancellation of their debt.

Centro Properties Group has changed its name to CNPR.

CNP managed funds including CRT, CAWF and DHT aggregated their respective portfolios to create the listed Australian retail property trust, CRF. CRF was formed by the stapling of CRL, CRT, CAWF and DHT through schemes of arrangement that were approved by the Supreme Court of New South Wales on 1 December 2011 (the Aggregation). The Aggregation happened on 14 December 2011. CNP contributed its Australian assets (including its funds and services business) to CRF, in exchange for scrip in CRF. That scrip, in addition to the CRF scrip which CNP held as a result of its investments in the aggregated funds resulted in CNP's ownership of the A-REIT being approximately 72% on implementation of aggregation. On implementation of the Senior Lenders' schemes of arrangement, CNP's scrip in CRF was distributed to the Senior Lenders on a pro-rata basis to their senior debt holdings. CNP securityholders did not receive any securities in CRF.

On 22 June 2013, Centro Retail became Federation Centres, after shareholders voted for a name change. In June 2015, Federation merged with Novion with the merged entity rebranded as Vicinity Centres.

The firm underwent a leadership transition when Grant Kelley, who served as the CEO of Vicinity Centres from 2018 to 2022, announced his retirement on 31 October 2022. Following this, Peter Huddles assumed the position of interim CEO and was officially appointed as the CEO on 31 January 2023.

Since 2009, the group has gradually narrowed its portfolio from convinence retail to regional shopping, partly using the funds generated to fund redevopments of its core assets.

== Properties ==
As of June 2024, Vicinity owned, managed or has shareholdings in 56 shopping centres. Each retail property typically has its own name, such as "The Glen" or "Colonnades", which reflects the way that the local communities refer to the shopping centre and a logo that contains the Vicinity's ribbon swirl. Vicinity is the second largest shopping centre investment and management company by GLA (gross lettable area) in Australia, and provides retail space to Coles and Woolworths. It has over 1200 staff in Australia.

=== New South Wales ===
- Armidale Central
- Bankstown Central (50%)
- Carlingford Court (50%)
- Chatswood Chase
- DFO Homebush
- Lake Haven Centre
- Nepean Village
- Queen Victoria Building (50%)
- The Galeries (50%)
- The Strand Arcade (50%)
- Warriewood Square (50%)

=== Victoria ===
- Altona Gate
- Bayside
- Box Hill Central
- Broadmeadows Central (50%)
- Chadstone Shopping Centre (50%)
- Cranbourne Park Shopping Centre (50%)
- DFO Essendon
- DFO Moorabbin
- DFO South Wharf
- DFO Uni Hill (50%)
- Emporium Melbourne (50%)
- Mornington Central (50%)
- Myer Bourke Street (33%)
- Northland Shopping Centre (50%)
- Oakleigh Central
- Sunshine Marketplace (50%)
- The Glen (50%)
- Victoria Gardens (50%)

=== Queensland ===
- Buranda Village
- DFO Brisbane
- Grand Plaza Shopping Centre (50%)
- Harbour Town Premium Outlets Gold Coast (50%)
- QueensPlaza
- Uptown, Brisbane

=== South Australia ===
- Castle Plaza
- Colonnades Shopping Centre (50%)
- Elizabeth City Centre

=== Tasmania ===
- Eastlands
- Northgate

=== Western Australia ===
- DFO Perth (50%)
- Ellenbrook Central
- Galleria (50%)
- Karratha City (50%)
- Lakeside Joondalup (50%)
- Livingston Marketplace
- Mandurah Forum (50%)
- Rockingham Centre (50%)
- Victoria Park Central
- Warwick Grove

== See also ==
- Centro Shopping America Trust, an investment product part of Centro Properties Group that acquires shopping centres around the United States
