= Venture (department store) =

Australian department store chain

- Industry: Retail
- Founded: 1970; 56 years ago
- Founder: Bob Lee; Robert Morris; Bernie Buckley
- Defunct: 1994; 32 years ago
- Fate: Liquidation
- Area served: Australian Capital Territory, New South Wales, Queensland, South Australia, Tasmania and Victoria

Venture was a chain of discount department stores that operated in Australia between 1970 and 1994.

Unrelated to the defunct North American chain of the same name (see Venture Stores), Venture is best remembered as a retailer of medium quality women's and children's clothing as well as soft homewares.

The Hobart outlet was also notable for having an in-store restaurant called Charlie's.

Venture experienced financial difficulties in the late 1980s and early 1990s, and was placed in liquidation in April 1994, with all stores closing soon after.

== History ==
The first Venture store opened in Geelong in 1970, followed by Ballarat, with additional stores opening across Melbourne over the next two years. The business was started by Bob Lee, Robert Morris and Bernie Buckley. Bob Lee started his retail career with Lindsay & McKenzie in Geelong, which later became Target Australia. All three worked at Target Stores prior to forming Venture Stores.

In November 1972, the business expanded into New South Wales, opening a store at Merrylands shopping complex. At that time there was a total of 16 stores across Victoria.

Additional stores in NSW at Mount Druitt and Liverpool followed in 1973. The merchandise range at that time included "a wide range of women's fashions, sportswear, knitwear, underwear, nightware, hosiery, corset wear, menswear, children's clothing, manchester, fabrics, bedding and furnishing"; a description that remained constant over the 24 years of operation.

In 1973, the South Australian-based department store John Martin's acquired an initial 50% shareholding in the company from the original owner, Robert Morris. The investment by John Martins facilitated expansion of the chain into South Australia and Queensland. John Martins eventually moved to 100% ownership.

In 1981, John Martins was taken over by Solomon Lew, who subsequently sold the company to the Melbourne-based Cookes family, headed by David Cookes. The John Martins department store chain was sold to Sydney-based retailer David Jones in 1985, with the Cookes family retaining ownership of Venture.

The Cookes family appointed experienced retailer Bob Bourke to manage the chain in 1981, and he revitalised the chain, closing unprofitable stores and changing the merchandise focus to budget-priced, quality apparel, aimed mainly at women, teenage girls and children. During Bourke's first three years, turnover doubled and profitability increased, aided by a focus on own-branded merchandise which was not subject to competitor comparison.

In February 1987, Venture purchased the Waltons chain from Alan Bond, consisting of 47 Waltons and Norman Ross stores, plus the South Australian-based J. Miller Anderson & Co. department store business, which closed in 1988. The Waltons stores were converted to Venture outlets, which increased the number of stores to 70 across all states of Australia, except Western Australia.

== Demise and closure ==
In the late 1980s, Venture faced increasing competition from its main competitors Big W, Kmart Australia and Target Australia, which had larger store networks, bigger stores (and higher average sales per store) and better economies of scale.

The Cookes family announced plans to float Venture in February 1989 to help reduce the high debt levels, but these plans were scrapped in favour of a capital restructure, which included a debt for equity swap.

In 1992, Venture was placed into receivership, and was purchased from the receivers for A$12 million by a joint venture between the New Zealand-based department store chain Farmers Deka (now Farmers Trading Company) and the Perth based companies Action Holdings and Vox. In December 1992 Farmers Deka acquired 100% of Venture, with ownership passing to Western Australian-based grocery wholesaler and retailer Foodland Associated Limited (FAL), a former Australian company later acquired by IGA.

In the 1993 FAL annual report it was written "Venture's management has made significant progress in establishing and repositioning Venture's image as a destination store by merchandising every day repeat purchase items at competitive prices while maintaining its focus on the female with young children as the primary customer base."

However, on 24 February 1994 Venture was placed into administration. The announcement from FAL included the statement "The directors of FAL decided to discontinue support after a comprehensive review over the past 4 weeks. This review process did not satisfy the directors that Venture had a viable future and it was, therefore, in the best interests of FAL shareholders that it be sold or wound up as soon as possible".

Following an 8-week sale process it was announced on 16 April 1994 that Venture had been placed in liquidation due to the failure of negotiations with potential buyers of the business. The closing down sale commenced on 16 April 1994, with all 45 stores closing on or before 14 May 1994.

== Former store locations ==
The following listing contains all Venture stores that operated during its 24-year history. Not all these locations were open at the time Venture ceased operations in May 1994.

Australian Capital Territory
- Monaro Mall/Canberra Civic (acquired from Waltons)
- Woden Plaza
- Belconnen Mall

New South Wales

- Albury (had the first escalators in Albury)
- Armidale (former Waltons store)
- Auburn
- Bankstown (former Waltons store)
- Baulkham Hills
- Blacktown (former Waltons store)
- Bondi Junction (former Waltons store)
- Burwood (former Waltons store)
- Cabramatta
- Campbelltown
- Caringbah
- Carlingford
- Cessnock
- Chatswood
- Coffs Harbour
- Dee Why (former Waltons store; free-standing store over three floors)
- Fairfield
- Gosford (former Waltons store, was located in Market Town centre)
- Hornsby (former Waltons store)
- Hurstville (former Waltons store)
- Kotara (Garden City)
- Liverpool
- Merrylands
- Mount Druitt
- Newcastle, Hunter Street
- Nowra
- Parramatta (former Waltons store, part of the Westfield Parramatta site; over two floors)
- Penrith
- Seven Hills
- Taree
- Top Ryde
- Wollongong (Crown Central)

Victoria

- Kilsyth (now NQR)
- Coburg (now Dan Murphy’s)
- Box Hill (Whitehorse Plaza)
- Forest Hill (Forest Hill Chase, was Dimmeys, now JB Hi-Fi, Rebel Sport)
- Brandon Park
- Clayton (was World 4 Kids, was BiLo, now Coles, near Centre Road)
- Waverley Gardens
- Frankston (former Waltons store)
- Keysborough (Parkmore)
- Dandenong (former Waltons store; now Dimmeys)
- Greensborough Plaza, now Rebel Sport)
- Lalor
- Melton, at Coburns Shopping Centre
- Morwell
- Northcote (405 High Street)
- Sale
- Shepparton (store location converted to a Target)
- Sunbury
- Ballarat (now Rebel Sport)
- Geelong (Market Square)
- Corio Village
- Richmond
- Melton
- Wantirna South (Westfield Knox), was Toys "R" Us Babies R Us)
- Vermont South (now Aldi, was Franklins)
- Boronia
- Bulleen Plaza
- Mildura (two stories)
- Maribyrnong (Highpoint Shopping Centre)
- Bendigo
- Westfield Southland, now Harris Scarfe)

Queensland

- Alexandra Hills (now TK Maxx)
- Brisbane City
- Broadbeach (Pacific Fair)
- Burleigh Town Centre
- Carindale
- Deception Bay
- Everton Park former Walton’s
- Fortitude Valley (former Waltons store)
- Indooroopilly
- Kippa-Ring
- Loganholme (Logan Hyperdome)
- Mackay (Cane Lands)
- Redbank (Plaza)
- Rockhampton (Shopping Fair)
- Southport
- Toowoomba (Clifford Gardens)
- Townsville
- Upper Mount Gravatt (Westfield Mt Gravatt)

South Australia

- Salisbury (Parabanks) (eventually acquired by Harris Scarfe and became the first suburban Harris Scarfe store)
- Elizabeth (this Venture store had two storeys, and was eventually taken over by Harris Scarfe).
- Oaklands Park (Westfield Marion)
- Colonnades (was then taken over by Big W).
- West Lakes (now occupied by Harris Scarfe)
- Woodcroft
- Arndale, now Armada Arndale (Kilkenny)

Tasmania

- Devonport (now Harris Scarfe)
- Eastlands Shopping Centre
- Hobart (now Wendy's and Priceline on the upper level)
- Ulverstone (now Harris Scarfe)
- Launceston (now Target)
- Kingsmeadows (Never opened, was days from opening when company was liquidated)
