= Burwood Plaza =

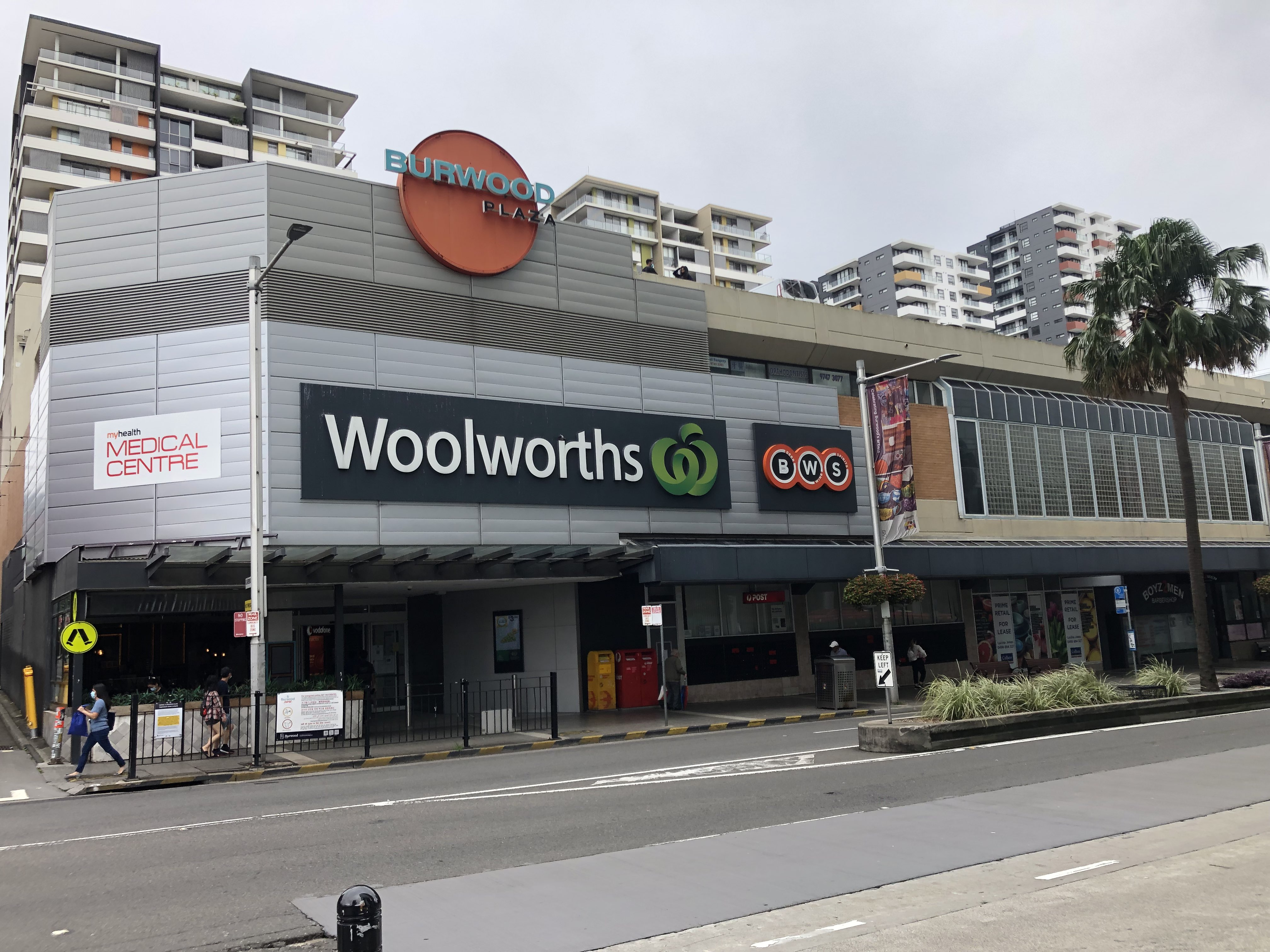
- Main entrance on Railway Parade (pictured in 2022)
- Location: Burwood, New South Wales
- Coordinates: 33.877507°S 151.102561°E
- Opened: 1978; 48 years ago
- Owner: Holdmark Property Group
- Num. of stores: 40+
- Num. of anchor tenants: 1
- Floor area: 12,361 m^{2} (133,050 sq ft)
- Floors: 3
- Parking: 1
- Public transit: Burwood
- Website: www.burwoodplaza.com.au burwoodplace.com.au

Burwood Plaza is a small 1970s-style two-storey shopping centre located in the suburb of Burwood in Sydney's Inner West, Australia.

== History ==
=== Origins ===
The site where Burwood Plaza now lies was once the site of Burwood's first theatre which opened in 1910. It was replaced by the Palatial Theatre which opened in 1921 and featured the first Christie pipe organ in a local theatre. The Palatial closed in 1971 and the space was used by the Royal Blind Society, then as a carpet showroom, before being demolished in 1978 to make way for Burwood Plaza.

Burwood Plaza opened in 1978 as a competitor to the neighbouring Westfield Burwood shopping centre and was originally anchored by a Waltons department store.

=== 2010s ===
In November 2014, Parramatta-based Holdmark Property Group acquired Burwood Plaza from Centuria Property Funds for a price of around $80 million. By 2016, they had received initial approval to build

=== 2020s ===
In 2023, the post office in the centre closed, despite community backlash.

In 2025, the building suffered a major safety incident during preparation for demolition with a section of a 10-storey residential property collapsing during demolition of the neighbouring structures, which caused scaffolding to fall and forced the evacuation of nearby residents and workers.

== Tenants ==
The anchor tenant is a Woolworths supermarket, one of the two in Burwood, with the other at rival centre Westfield Burwood. There was previously a Vodafone franchise inside of the centre that had been there since the early 2000s but closed in 2026, despite still appearing on the centre's website. There are 46 tenants listed on the centre website as of May 2026.

== Future ==
Following their acquisition, Holdmark moved quickly to develop the site, obtaining initial approval in 2016 for a five-tower development of up to 49 storeys on the site of Burwood Plaza as well neighbouring buildings. Work started on the project, now known as Burwood Place, in 2025, with the project now expanded to include a library, public recreation, residential, retail and office space. The project has been split into three stages, an urban park, Stage 1 and Stage 2. Only Stage 2 uses the site of the current shoppng centre. Coles is expected to be the anchor tenant for Stage 1, which is expected to open in 2028.

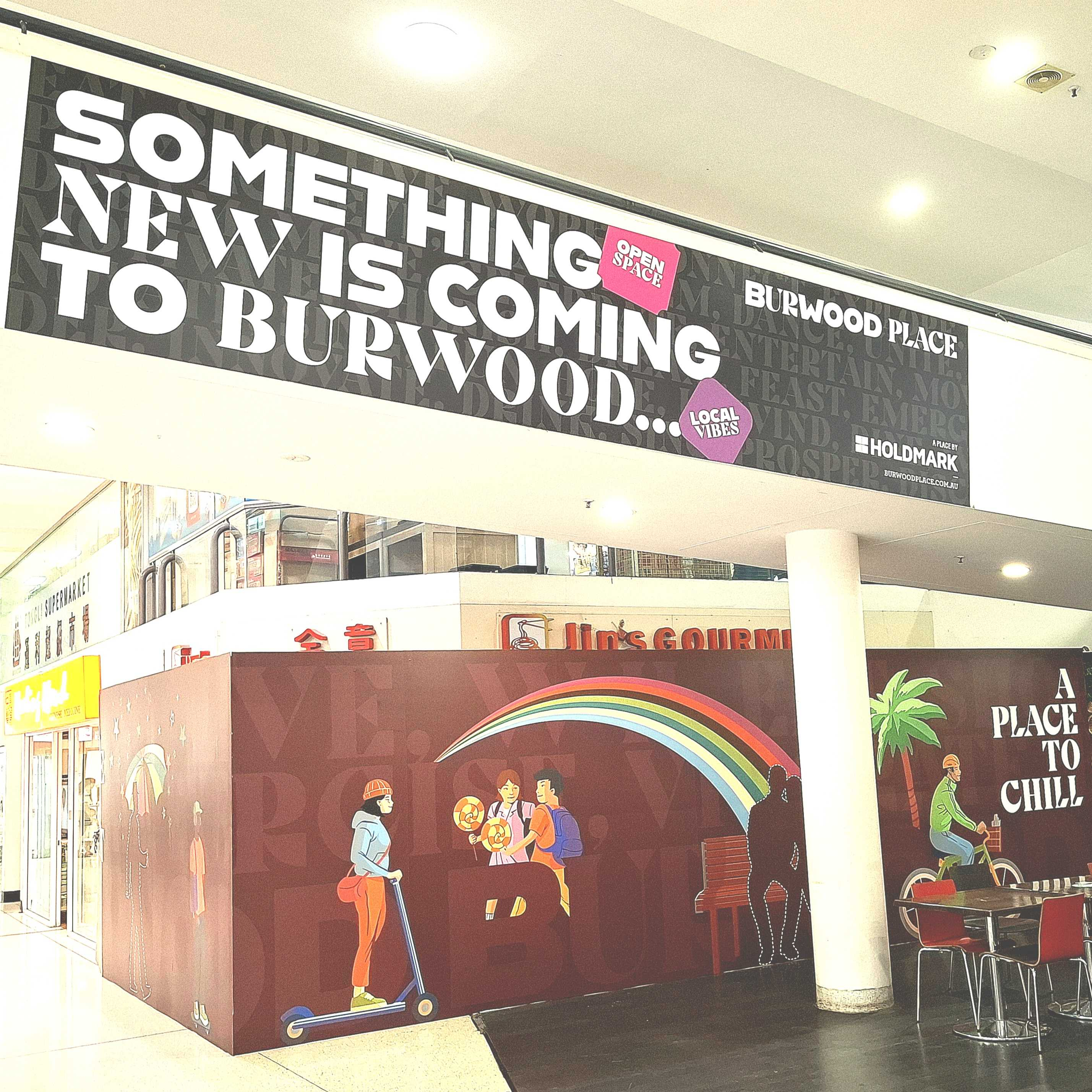
An advertisement for Holdmark's "Burwood Place" redevelopment project, covering a disused former tenant space inside of Burwood Plaza

== Gallery ==
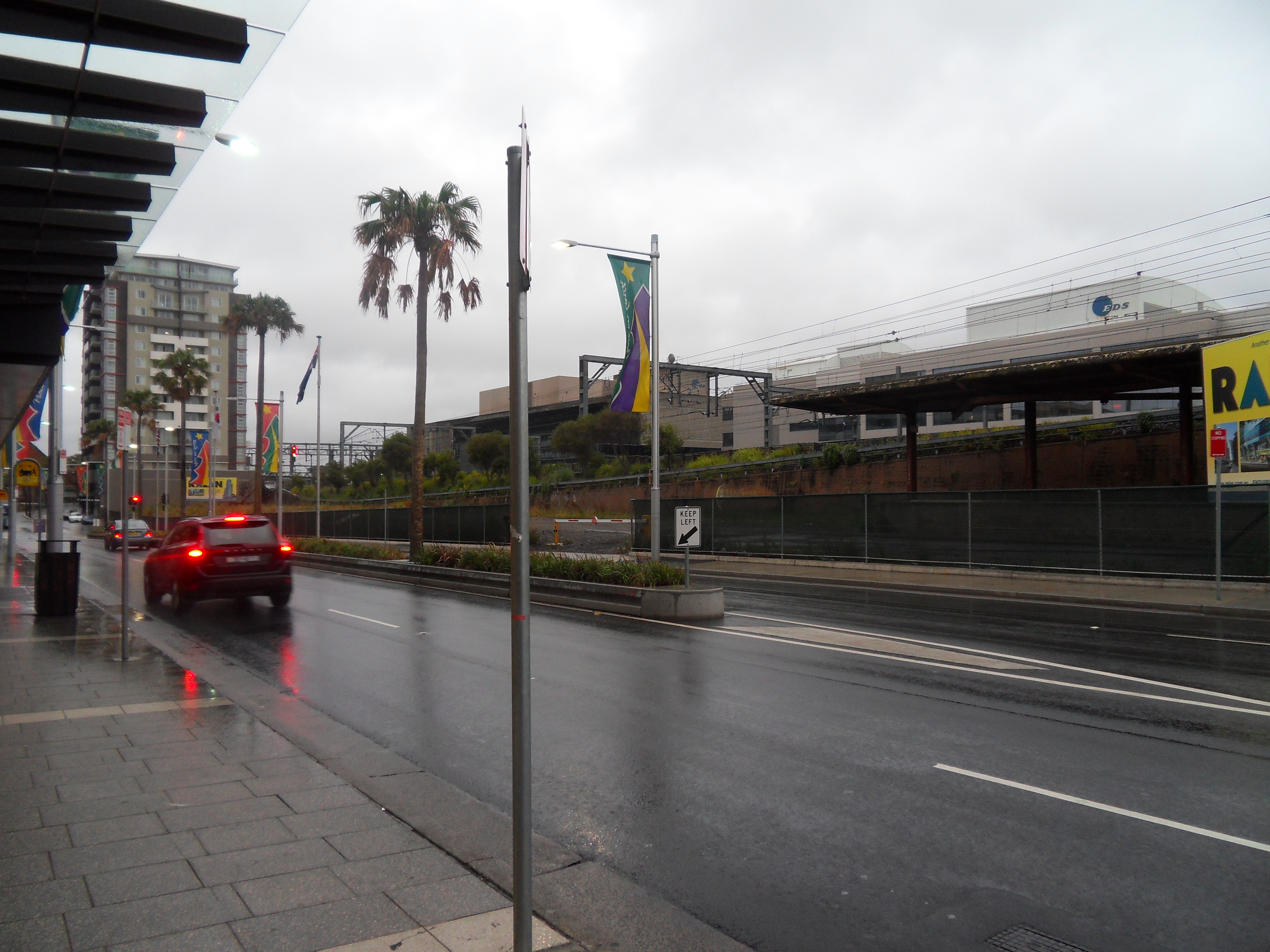
View outside of the main entrance

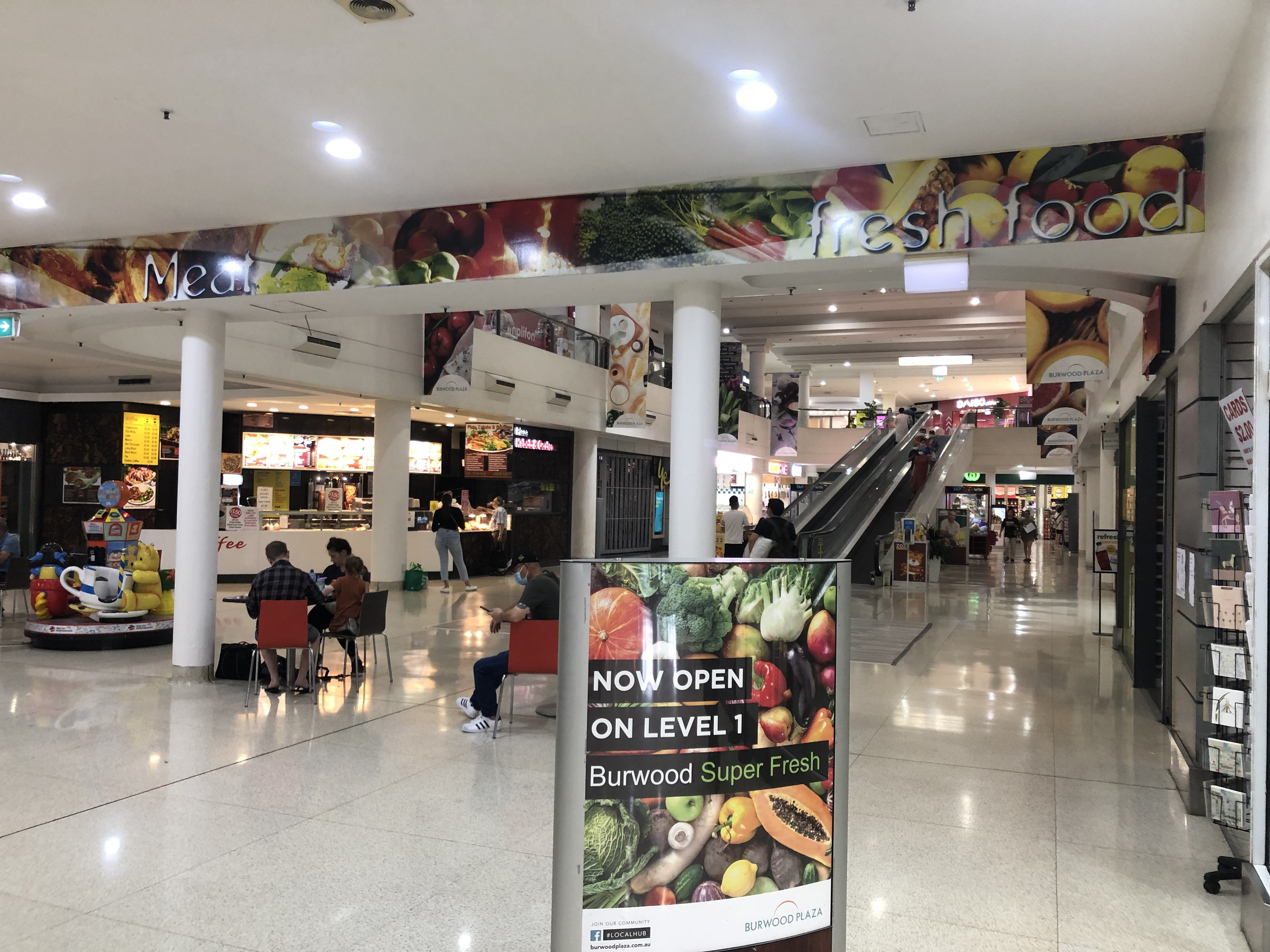
Level 1 area near Woolworths Supermarket

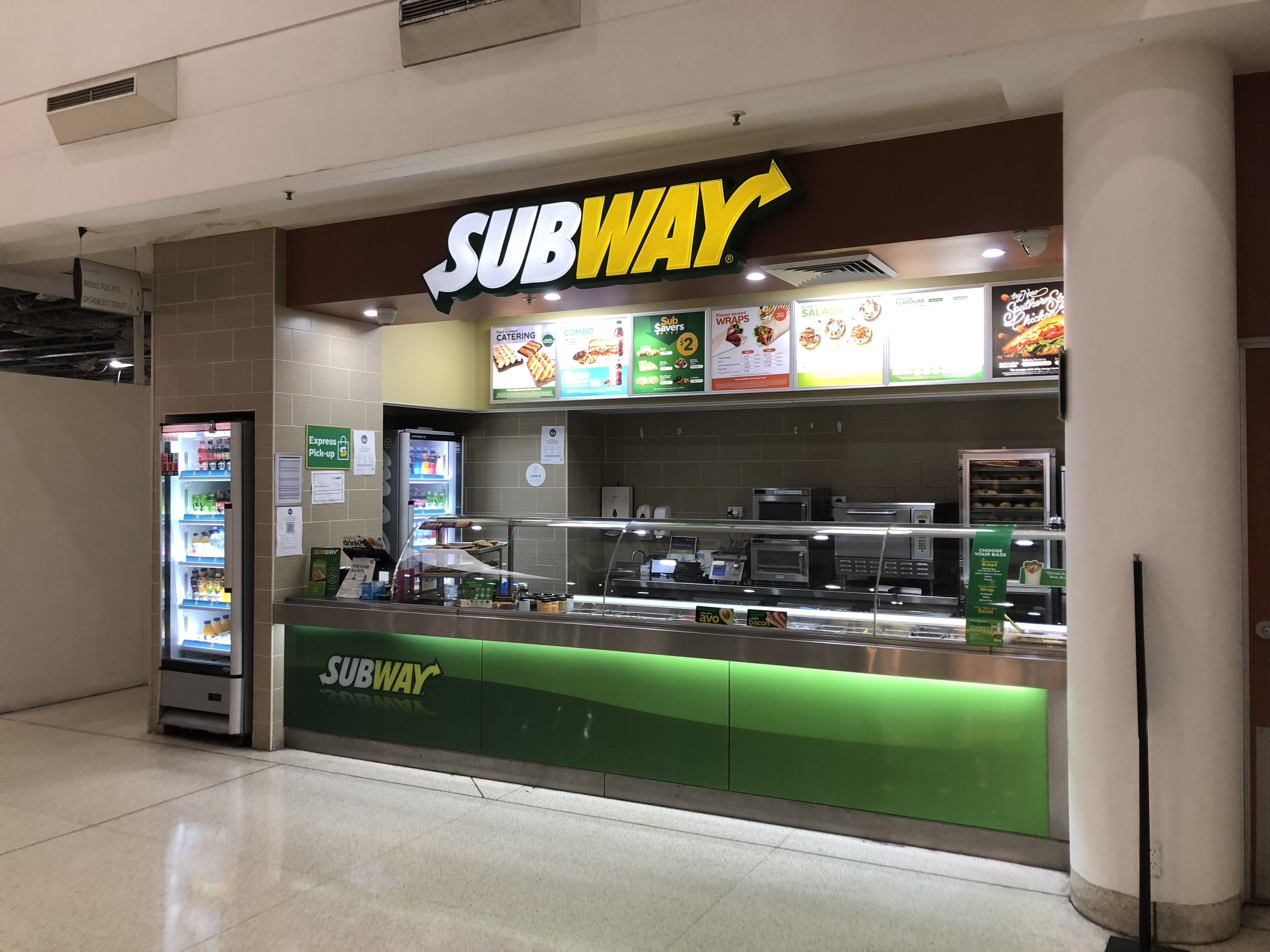
Subway franchise on Level 1

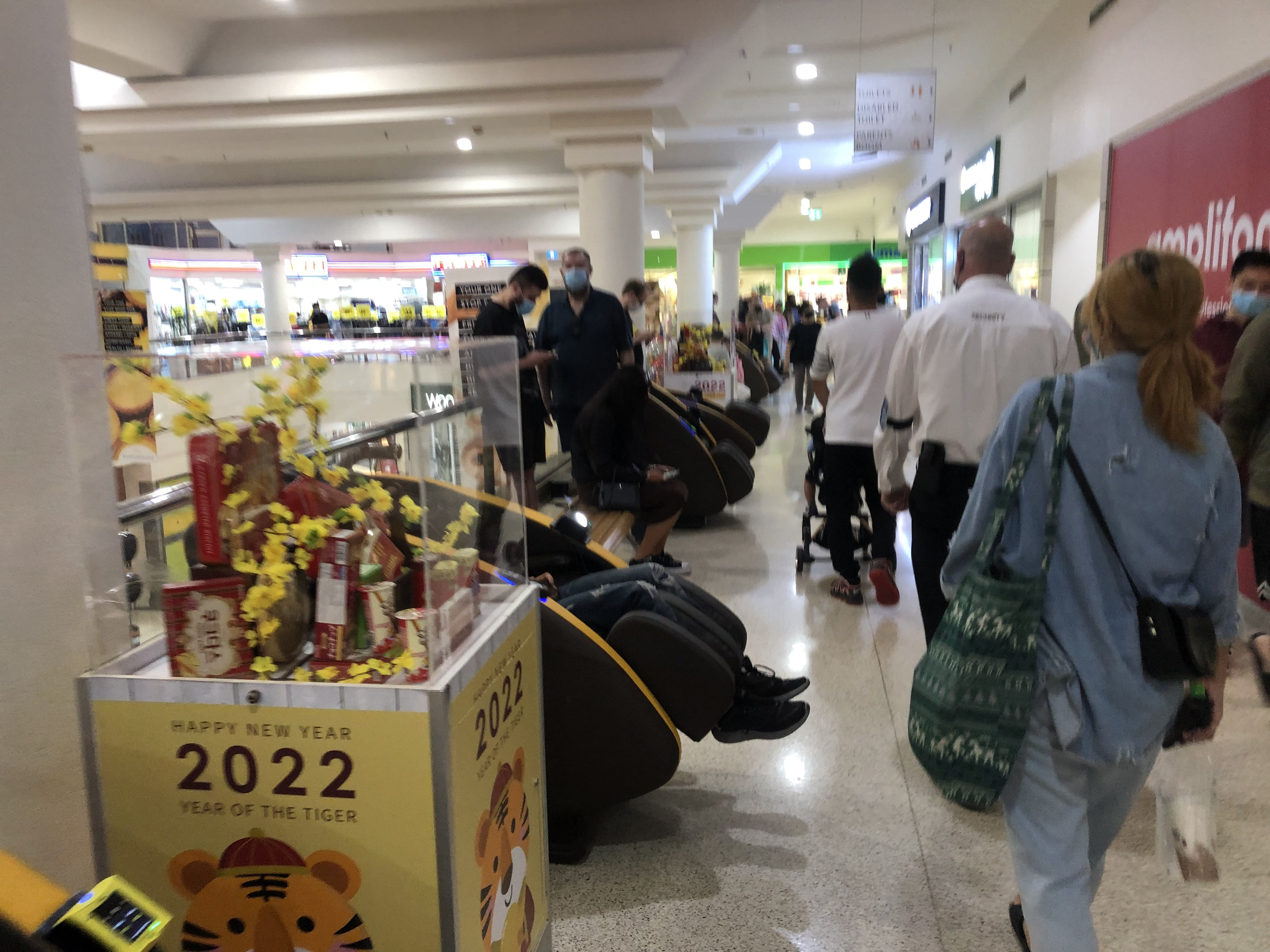
Level 2 area near Lowes Menswear
