= Waltons (department store) =

Former Australian department store chain

- Final logo, used from 1977 to 1987
- Industry: Retail
- Founded: 1951; 75 years ago
- Founder: John Walton
- Defunct: 1987; 39 years ago
- Headquarters: George Street, Sydney, Australia
- Area served: Australian Capital Territory; New South Wales; Victoria; Queensland; South Australia
- Products: Department store

Waltons was an Australian department store chain, founded by John Walton (1904–1998).

== History ==
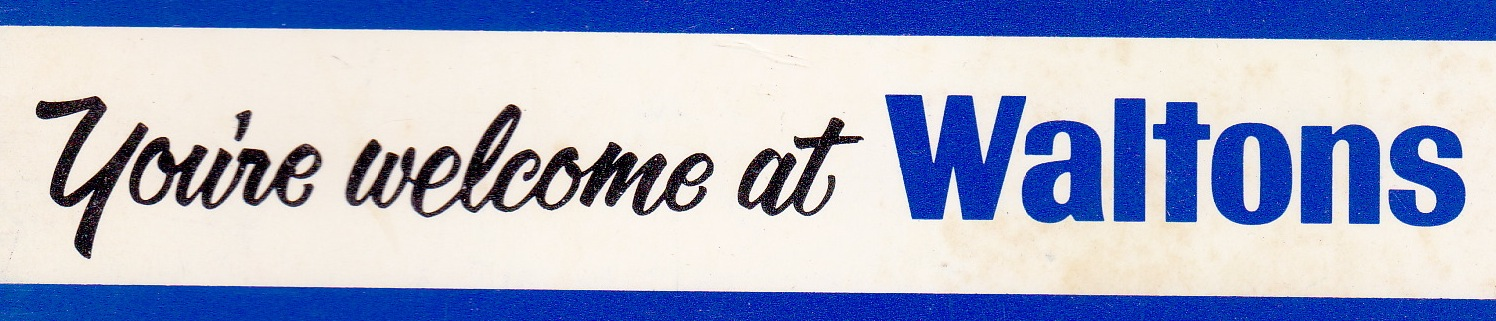
Walton's slogan

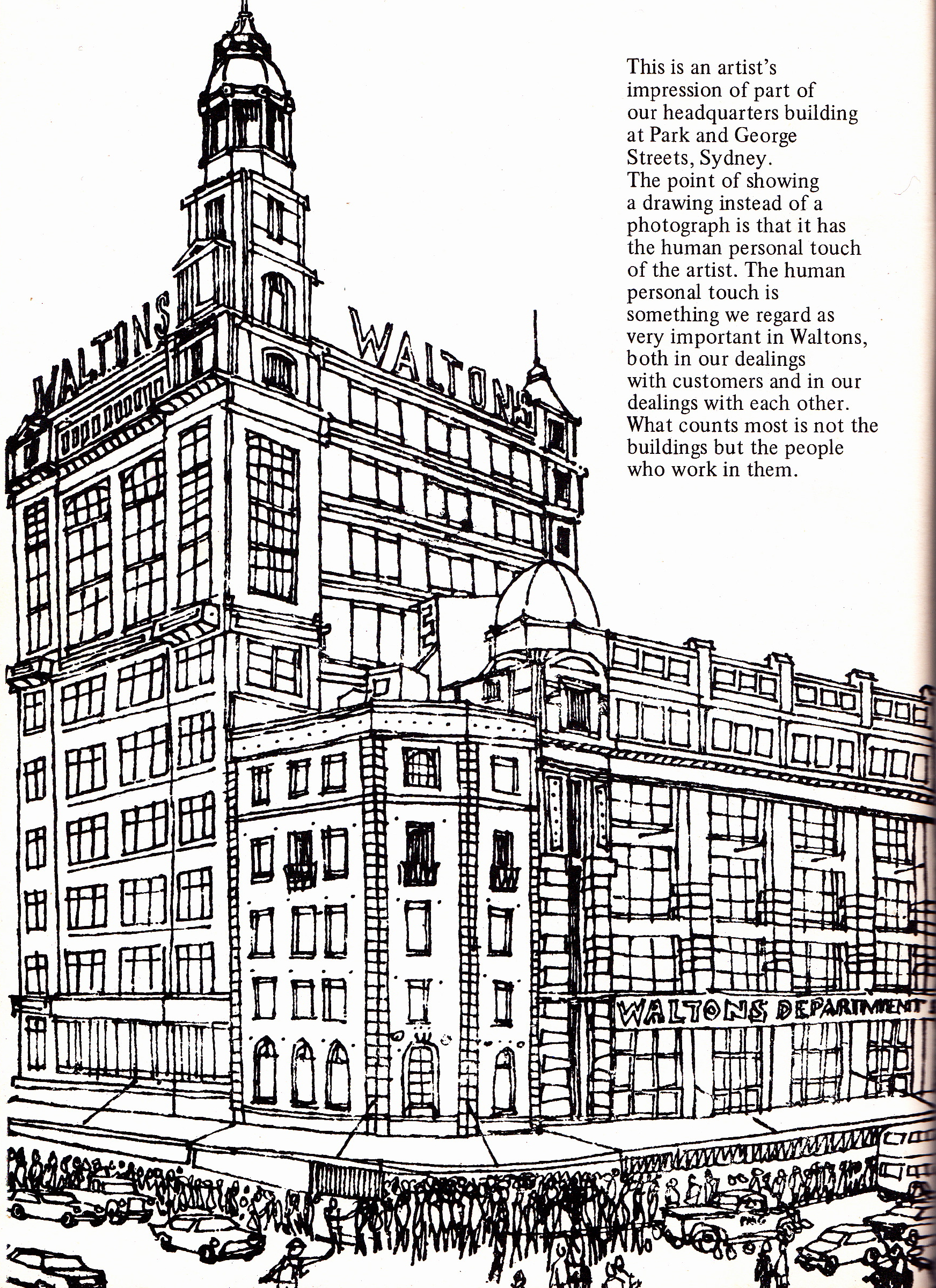
Drawing of former Walton's flagship store on the corner of George & Park Streets, Sydney

Walton bought a menswear store in 1951, located on George Street, Sydney, opposite the Queen Victoria Building and Sydney Town Hall and near Town Hall station. Over the years it was expanded along Park Street with adjoining properties purchased.

In 1955, Walton formed an alliance with the American retail giant Sears, Roebuck and Co. In the early 1960s, he started a finance company in partnership with Citibank, and also moved into insurance. That part of the business was sold to Norwich Union in 1980.

There were changes in the retail scene in Australia in the 1960s and Waltons Limited bought out Marcus Clark & Co in 1966, and then Anthony Hordern & Sons, merging its country store operation into the Walton's store group. That excluded the Brickfield Hill store in the south of the Sydney central business district, which by 1969 had already closed. Waltons then acquired McDowells in 1972. By 1972, the Waltons chain had expanded to 96 department stores before Walton retired as executive chairman. Sir John severed his ties with the company in 1976, and his son John took over.

Alan Bond bought Waltons in 1981, but the purchase became a financial disaster, with Bond losing $199 million in 1983. The Waltons department store name was dropped by new owners in the form of a $75 million clearance sale when Bond sold Waltons in 1987 (and closed its employee superannuation fund), to interests associated with the Cooke family. The Cooke family re-branded the remaining stores as Venture and Norman Ross outlets. In 1994, Venture went bankrupt.

The flagship Waltons department store on George Street, Sydney, was demolished, and employees and the media were informed that Bond Corporation intended to build Australia's tallest building, including a brand new Waltons store, on the same site. Due to the above-mentioned losses, that didn't happen. The piece of prime real estate remained nothing more than a huge hole in the ground for years. It was finally replaced by the Citibank office tower, which includes the Galeries Victoria retail space. The main Melbourne store, on Bourke Street, was remodelled into a Village Cinemas complex, which closed in 2006.

The Waltons store in Fortitude Valley, Brisbane, still has a Brunswick Street Mall store-front with "Waltons" signage, but with blacked-out door glass since the store closed around 1987. The street entrances or exits to the bottom level, which were occupied by Asian novelty product stores until the late 2010s, still have the word "Walton" screwed into the wall, with the S possibly having been removed as a souvenir.

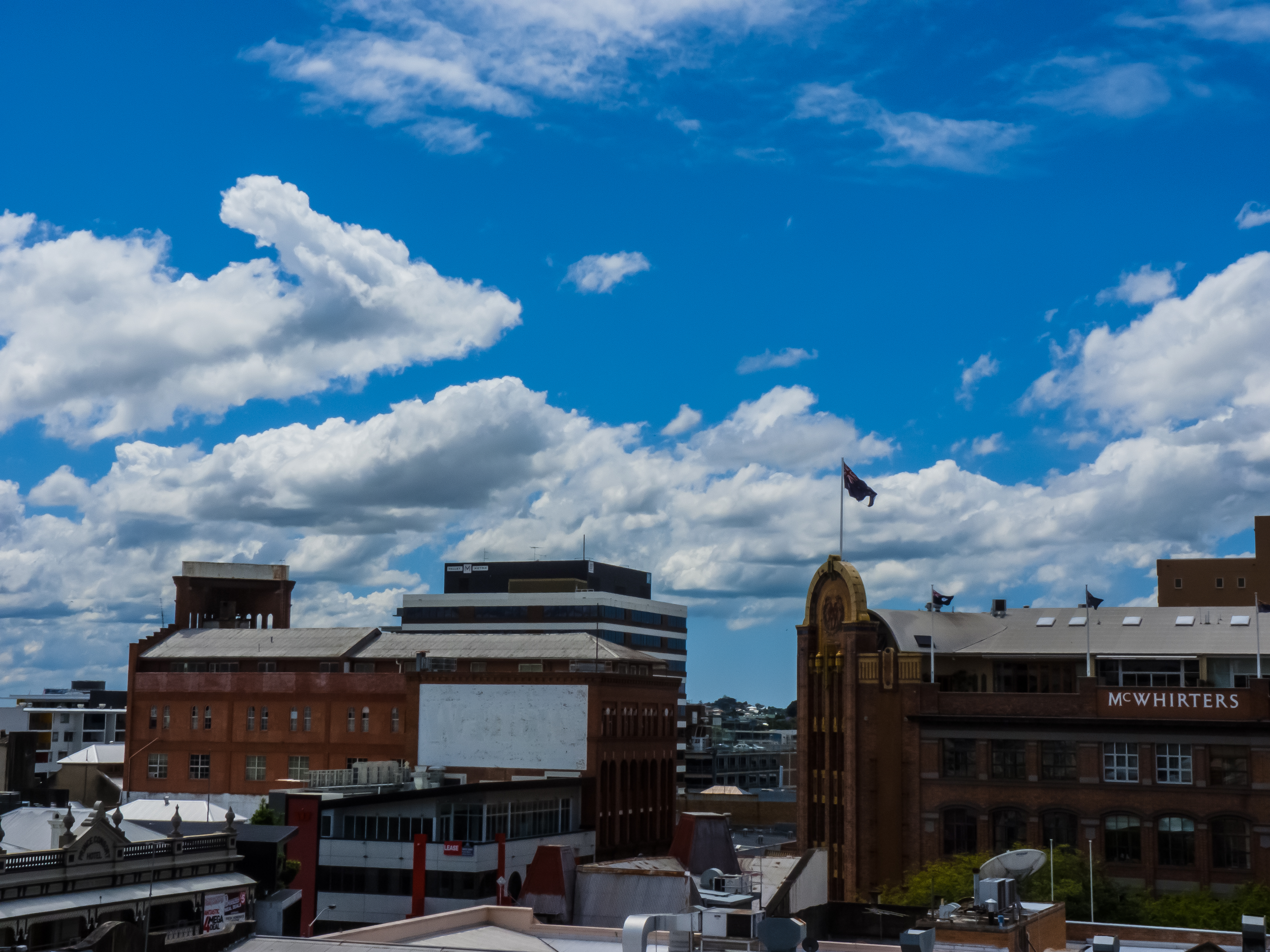
Former Waltons and former McWhirters department stores in Fortitude Valley, Queensland.

== Operations ==
=== Australian Capital Territory ===
- Canberra City (acquired from Marcus Clark & Co)

=== New South Wales ===
- Albury (occupied Mates Building)
- Armidale (acquired from Marcus Clark & Co)
- Auburn (homewares only)
- Bankstown (opened on 21 September 1961)
- Bathurst (Bentinck Street)
- Blacktown (opened 1963)
- Bondi Junction (acquired from McDowells)
- Burwood (opened 1978 inside Burwood Plaza)
- Caringbah (acquired from McDowells)
- Chatswood (opened 1958, homewares only)
- Coffs Harbour
- Dee Why (acquired from McDowells)
- Dubbo (opened 1958)
- Eastwood (acquired from McDowells)
- Engadine (homewares only)
- Fairfield Apparently this store was burnt down in 1983, then relocated in a temporary location
- Forbes (acquired from Marcus Clark)
- Gosford (original store on Mann St (Froggy's building) then moved to Marketown SC, upgraded from a homewares store 1979)
- Goulburn (acquired from Marcus Clark)
- Grafton
- Gunnedah (acquired from Marcus Clark)
- Hornsby (acquired from McDowells)
- Hurstville (opened in Westfield Hurstville 1978)
- Inverell (acquired from Marcus Clark)
- Katoomba
- Kempsey
- Lismore (acquired from Marcus Clark)
- Lithgow (acquired from Marcus Clark)
- Liverpool (opened 1972)
- Maitland (opened 1971 acquired from A.S Mehan and Co)
- Manly (homewares only)
- Muswellbrook 55-57 Bridge Street Closed 1985
- Newcastle, Hunter Street (Bank Corner) (acquired from Marcus Clark)
- Newtown
- Orange (acquired from Marcus Clark)
- Parkes
- Parramatta (opened 1975)
- Penrith (opened 1973)
- Rockdale
- Summer Hill, closed in the mid-1970s
- Sydney City, corner George & Park Streets (Town Hall)
- Tamworth (acquired from Marcus Clarke)
- Taree
- The Entrance This was a small homewares store opened 1968 closed in the early 1970s, was operated from the Gosford Store.
- Tumut (acquired from Marcus Clark)
- Wagga Wagga (acquired from Marcus Clark)
- West Ryde
- Wollongong (acquired from Marcus Clark)

=== Victoria ===
Nearly all these stores closed in 1983

- Bourke Street, Melbourne central business district
- Chapel Street, Prahran
- Westfield Doncaster
- Wodonga
- Lonsdale Street, Dandenong (Became Venture, now Dimmeys)
- Blackburn (Warehouse)
- Box Hill
- Brunswick
- Coburg
- Croydon
- Frankston
- Geelong
- Oakleigh
- Reservoir
- Ringwood
- Sunshine
- Greensborough Plaza
- Maribyrnong (Highpoint West shopping centre)
- Glenroy

=== Queensland ===
- Brisbane City
- Fortitude Valley (acquired Overells in 1956, became Venture
- Upper Mt Gravatt became Venture
- Everton Park
- Nundah
- Mount Gravatt East (closed 1987)
- Cannon Hill
- Palm Beach (opened 1984)
- Southport
- Toowoomba
- Cairns
- Redcliffe
- Indooroopilly Shoppingtown
- Bundaberg (closed 1987 became Norman Ross then Venture)
- Maryborough
- Rockhampton
- Townsville
- Aitkenvale
- Ipswich
- Mackay (burned down in 1978)

=== South Australia ===
Miller Anderson Limited was acquired by Waltons Limited, as a result over its 1966 takeover of Marcus Clark & Co. Miller Anderson Limited had stores in the following locations:

- Adelaide, 16–24 Hindley Street (closed in 1989)
- Clare
- Brighton

== See also ==
- Department stores around the world
