= JB Young's =

J.B. Young Limited
- Trade name: JB Young's
- Company type: Private
- Industry: Retail
- Founded: 1914; 112 years ago in Queanbeyan, New South Wales
- Founder: James Buchanan Young
- Products: Department store

J.B. Young Ltd (JB Young's) were a chain of retail department stores, founded in the New South Wales country town of Queanbeyan, by businessman and country traveler James Buchanan Young in 1914.

== History ==
=== Early history ===
Young, originally from Ireland, had migrated to Australia in 1885, arriving first in Sydney. By the 20th century, James Young had settled in country New South Wales and was working for Dutton Brothers, in Blayney.

Moving to Queanbeyan in 1914, James Young quickly established what would be JB Young's first store, in Queanbeyan's main street. Business was hard during these years with World War I underway and harsh economic conditions.

After the decision to locate Australia's new capital Canberra in the 1920s, one of the JB Young's managers Mr HG Colman, then crossed the New South Wales border into the nation's new capital and purchased the first block of commercial property ever being offered. This was over at the Eastlake shopping precinct and was purchased for £A2,050. This occurred early in December, 1924. Building work commenced immediately and initially the original Eastlake store, which would a short time later become known as Kingston, was opened in stages between 1925 and 1927.

These were pioneering times for the nation's capital, as not even Canberra's Civic centre precinct had been established at this time. In 1926, the firm saw a staff management buyout, with fellow directors, Mr Webb, Mr Greenwood, together with Mr HG Colman, taking ownership. By 1928, James Young had decided to fully retire and a farewell dinner was held, with Mr and Mrs Young then from that moment on retiring to Manly in Sydney.

=== Expansion ===
The firm continued to grow. After the Kingston store had been established, efforts were made to establish another new store this time in Civic. This became the store at Garema Place.

Post war activity and major building work in Canberra, during the 1950s and 1960s, saw Canberra expand and JB Young's, with it. In 1960, JB Young became a public company and they were listed on the Australian Securities Exchange. This would see the growth of even more stores, especially outside the Australian Capital Territory.

Locally, JB Young's continued to grow its supermarket business, with a shop in the newly established Deakin shopping precinct, during 1963. Shortly after, JB Young's opened another new supermarket, this time over in Hackett, which was opened on 9 June 1966.

Around 1966, the Kingston store had expanded with another level being added and had undergone further refurbishment. A few years later during 1970, JB Young's expanded considerably, taking over the Fosseys retail store group. Fosseys had been established in 1926 with its earliest store having been established in George Street Sydney, by Alfred Bristow Fossey.

In 1970, the company acquired the E.C. Hattam chain of department stores in Victoria.

By 1971, JB Young's had managed to form a strong retail presence within the ACT and surrounding areas of country NSW. Young's had the original store in Monaro Street, Queanbeyan, the one in Giles Street Kingston, plus the store in Garema Place, Civic. Also there were other JB Young stores around Canberra, including Dickson, Manuka, Curtin, Jamison and Aranda.

With all the growth, additional facilities had been needed. Prior to 1971, JB Young's had established three main warehouses in the Canberra industrial suburb of Fyshwick. This included a central warehouse in Yallourn Street, an electrical warehouse in Barrier St and a food and catering warehouse, located at 36 Geelong St. The Geelong Street site was also connected directly to the Canberra to Sydney, rail line. This allowed JB Young to receive bulk grocery supplies for its food outlets.

JB Young's also operated a television servicing business out of the Barrier Street, Fyshwick site, a sound centre over in Green Square, Kingston and a building materials supply business, out of its Monaro Street, Queanbeyan site.

In 1974, JB Young's made yet another acquisition, this time taking over Canberra and Country NSW retailer, Charles Rogers & Sons, who had established a store in East Row, Civic. Charles Rogers and Sons had originally been founded in Goulburn, early on as a cabinet making business before becoming retail universal providers, during 1879. The Charles Rogers business had prospered particularly well with the expansion and development of the NSW railway network as it grew into the Southern area of NSW. After the death of Charles Rogers in 1909, his sons took over the Rogers business. However, by 1947, the Charles Rogers business had been sold to Burns Philp. It was around 1971, that Burns Philp had then sold it to JB Young's. The Charles Rogers East Row store, was originally built and opened during 1955.

After the take over of Rogers, as it was known in the ACT, the Rogers East Row store was fully rebranded as JB Young's. The former Rogers building, consisted of a basement, a ground floor and an upper first floor. JB Young's would assign the basement for hardware, the ground floor for men's and women's apparel, whilst the first floor was for other clothing and haberdashery.

The takeover of another long established country retailer J B Meagher and Co of Cootamundra, followed shortly after during 1974.

By 1976, Young's as it was now known, had established a large floorspace in the new Stage 3 development, of the Woden Plaza shopping centre, located in Philip. This further modernised its reach, particularly in local retailing.

Rationalisation though, was to occur two years later in 1978, with the nearby JB Youngs store in Manuka, closing.

In March 1976, the Kippax Shopping Centre in the Western Belconnen suburb of Holt, had opened. JB Youngs was to open another store there, plus also a Fosseys store and both were open by 1977.

On Wednesday 4 August 1979, JB Youngs announced in a full page ad in the Canberra Times, of the grand opening of their Belconnen Mall store.

=== Takeover ===
During early November 1979, long-established Sydney retailer Grace Bros made a take-over bid for control of all of the shares in JB Youngs Ltd. Ultimately, this was successful, and JB Youngs became another casualty in the takeover and mergers of retail stores that was occurring in Australia at the time. The purchase of JB Youngs helped Grace Brothers to increase the number of its stores at the time to around 130 across Australia. Grace Brothers itself would become a takeover target of the Melbourne-based Myer chain just a few years later, in 1983. By 1985, Myer itself had merged into the Coles-Myer group.

JB Young's Ltd was delisted from the Australian Stock Exchange in early 1980. Following the takeover of JB Youngs, gradually all its stores were either rebranded as Grace Bros, sold off, or closed. The JB Young's store at Curtin began its closing down sale during February 1981, closing shortly after. The other JB Young stores would follow. Others, like the one at Dickson, were rebranded; the store at Dickson would become Allens.

By 1985, following all the acquisitions, rationalisation had become a business necessity. Many of the former JB Youngs store sites in the ACT and country NSW, were sold by auction, by the newly created Coles-Myer Group. This included the East Row store site which became the Saraton Building.

In 1986, the remaining JB Youngs stores that were left, were rebranded mainly as Grace Brothers.

During the process the identity of JB Young's had come to an end. Ironically, the Fosseys chain would continue, as JB Youngs had always kept the trading operation of Fossey's, separate from the rest of the JB Young store operation. Many years later, Fossey's was merged by Coles-Myer, into their Target Australia chain.

JB Young's original Queanbeyan store was closed just prior to 1988 and the site was then sold and redeveloped becoming a new local icon, Queanbeyan's Riverside Plaza.

== Operations ==
=== Owl Discount Market Stores ===
Owl Discount Market Stores
- Company type: Division
- Industry: Retail
- Founded: 1931; 95 years ago in Queanbeyan, New South Wales
- Founder: JB Young
- Defunct: 1979; 47 years ago
- Number of locations: 13 stores (1977)
- Area served: Australian Capital Territory; New South Wales
- Parent: JB Young's

As well as the main JB Young stores, JB Young's had also established from 1931 onward, the "Owl Discount Market" stores, which supplied initially Queanbeyan then Canberra's population, with groceries. Often these would be attached to a JB Young's store already in existence. Examples of this were the JB Young's store at Kingston and then in the 1970s, the Woden Plaza store. Other Owl Discount Markets were also established in Deakin, Garran and Watson. In the latter years, the "Owl Discount Market" was also known as the "Li'l Owl Discount Market". By 1977, there were 13 Owl Discount Market outlets located across the ACT, Queanbeyan and Goulburn. Promoted heavily with advertising, trading was brisk with the stores very popular. From about 1971 through to 1979, Young's Owl Discount market would have a minimum of two full size pages in each Tuesday edition of the local Canberra Times, advertising their specials.

However, by early 1979, JB Young's had made a decision to close and sell off the Owl chain. By mid 1979, the Owl Discount Markets had all but disappeared, after having had for many years having served with such a high profile and popularity. Some were closed, whilst the others not actually attached to a JB Young's store, were sold off and would end up becoming part of the newly growing local Shoprite supermarket chain. Shoprite had begun its operations in Canberra, around 1976. The Shoprite group, continued to trade right through the 1980s and well into the 1990s.
