= Greensborough Plaza =

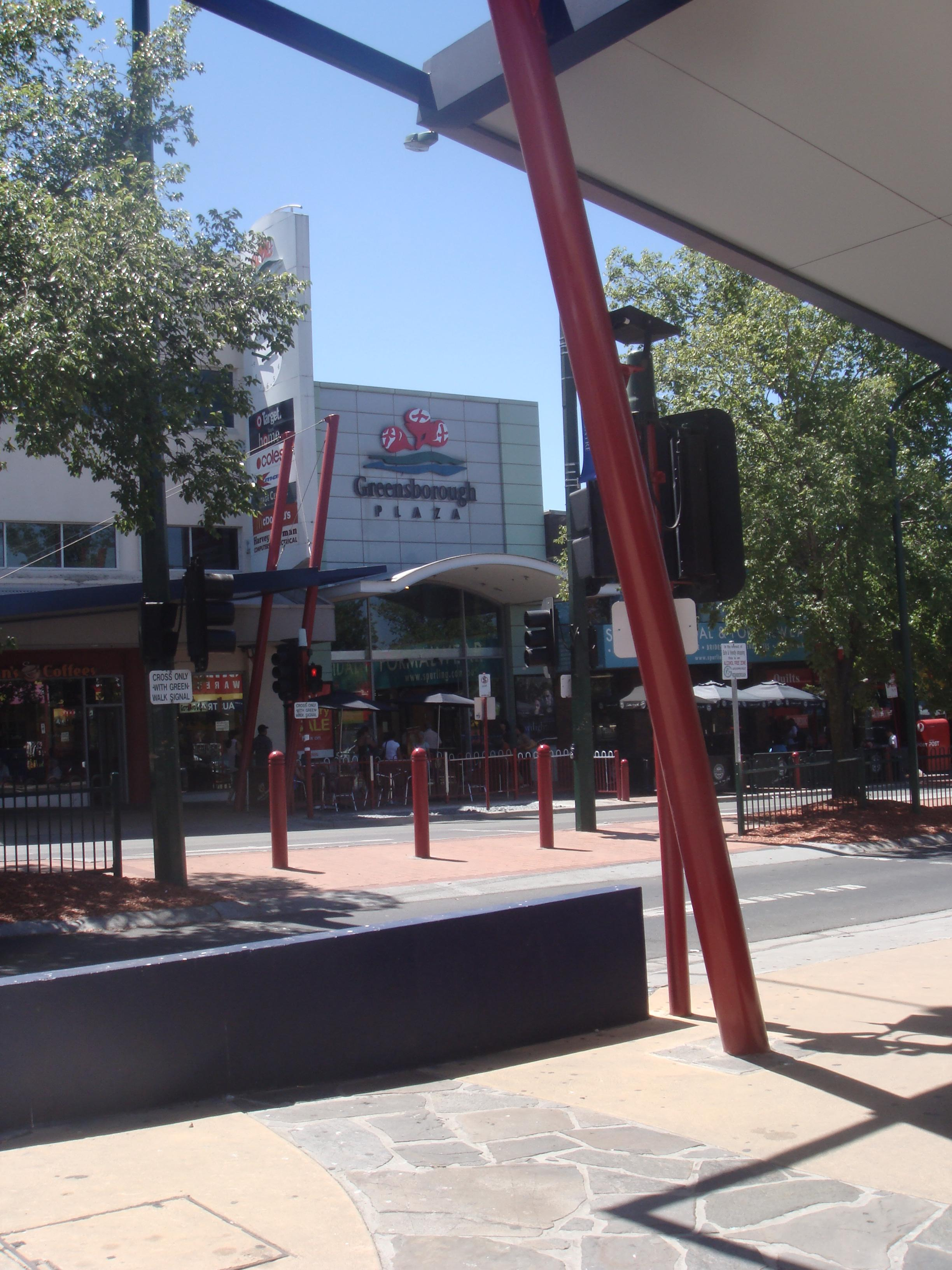
- Greensborough Plaza from Main St.
- Location: Greensborough, Victoria, Australia
- Coordinates: 37°42′14″S 145°06′07″E
- Opened: 1978
- Manager: JLL
- Owner: 151 Property
- Num. of stores: ~185
- Num. of anchor tenants: 6
- Floor area: 70,804 m^{2} (762,130 sq ft)
- Floors: 5
- Parking: ~2700
- Website: greensboroughplaza.com.au

Greensborough Plaza is a major regional shopping centre in the Melbourne suburb of Greensborough, Victoria, Australia, approximately 20 kilometres from the CBD.

Known to some locals as “Greensy”, the centre has an extensive range of majors and mini-majors including Coles, Aldi, Kmart, Target, Chemist Warehouse, JB Hi-Fi, The Reject Shop, Rebel Sport, Anytime Fitness and over 170 specialty stores.

The centre also has a dining and entertainment precinct that includes a Hoyts cinema complex.

== History and development ==
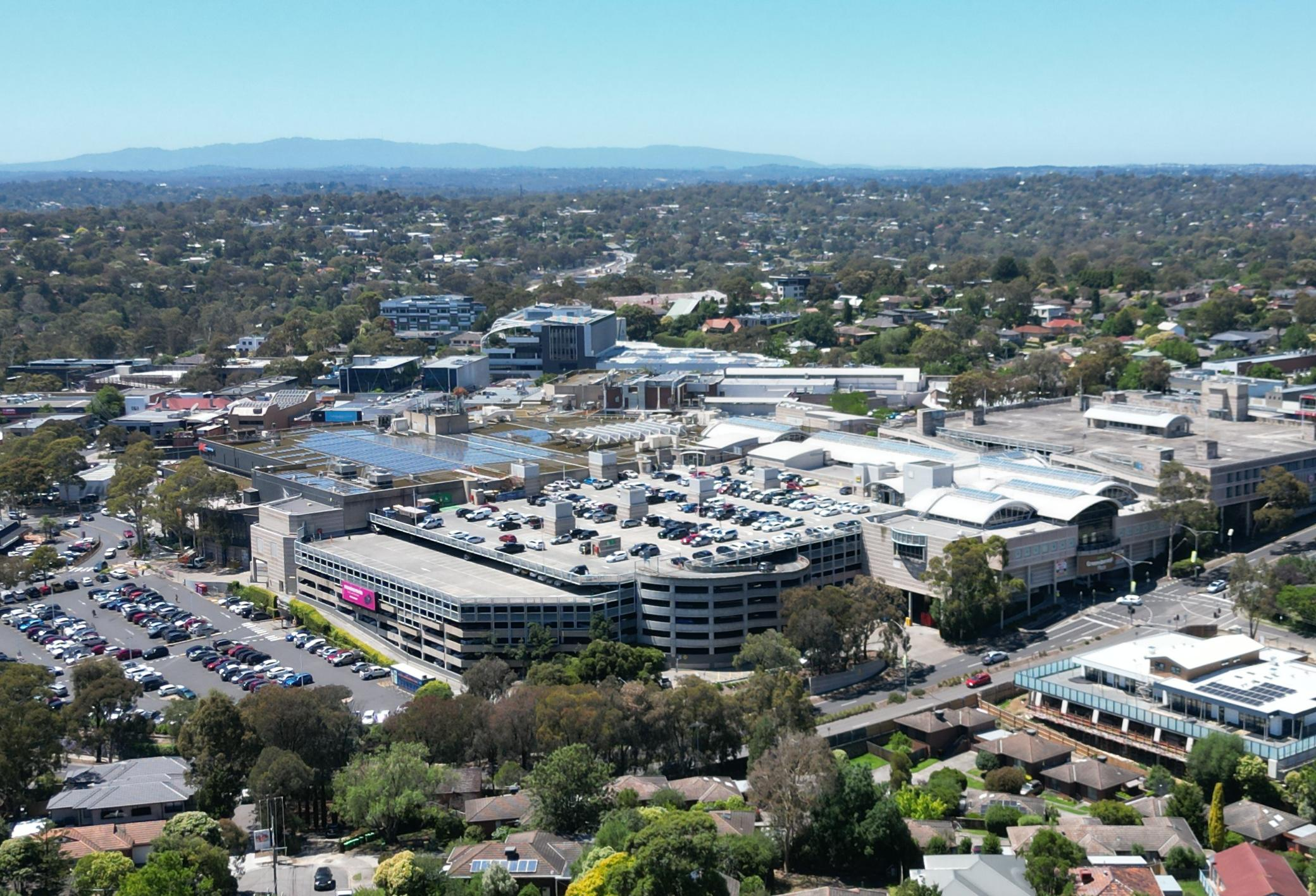
Greensborough Plaza facing Main Street with the Dandenong Ranges

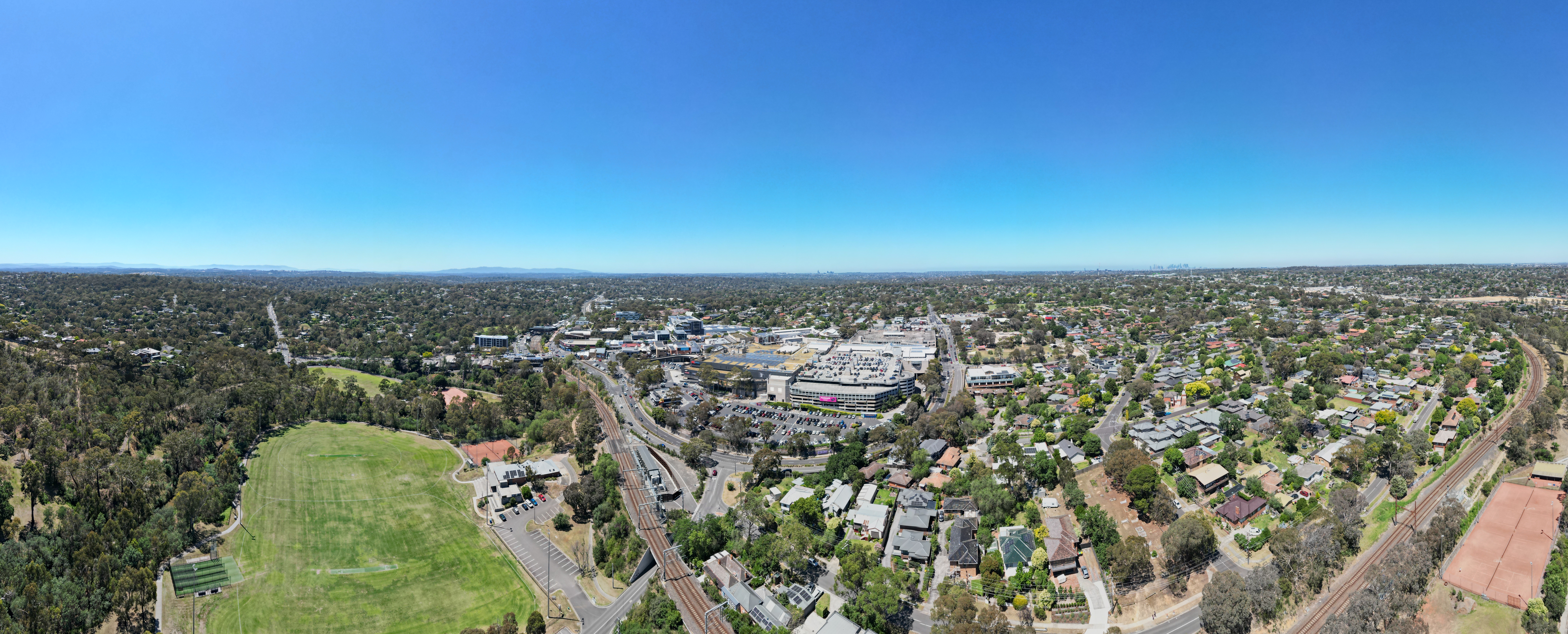
Greensborough Plaza and surrounds aerial panorama

=== Early days ===
First opening in 1978, the centre was known simply as Greensborough Shopping Centre. In around 1990, the centre was known as Valley Central, and the current Greensborough Plaza name was introduced in 1995. Former major tenants in the centre over the years have included: Waltons department store, Stan Cash, RM Williams, McEwans, Venture, Jewel Food Barn, Franklins No Frills, Dick Smith and World 4 Kids.

=== Redevelopments ===
The shopping centre has undergone two major renovations in its lifetime. The first of these renovations took place in 1990, and the second in 1996 which included the addition of a new 13,000m² Myer department store, the first new store for the chain to open within Victoria in over twenty years.

In 1998, both Harvey Norman and Rebel Sport both commenced operations at the centre. Both stores were designed as new larger concept stores which had never been tried by either retailer before.

Since 2011, the centre has undergone several stages of redevelopment. Stage one in 2011 saw new glass lifts installed in the centre court. Coles underwent a major refurbishment during this period and re-opened in 2012. In July 2011, Aldi and JB Hi-Fi opened on Level 1. Harvey Norman left the centre in 2015, with a much larger JB Hi-Fi store opening in its place later that year.

In 2014, most of the centre's interior was renovated. New lighting was installed around the centre court on levels 2 and 3, as well as through level 3. Painting of the interior walls and new seating were also carried out to give the centre a much more modern feel.

In late 2015, a new kids’ precinct opened on level 2, near the Main Street entrance to the centre. A new kids’ play space opened along with a few new stores and new amenities.

In late 2016, a new casual dining precinct opened on Level 3 near the Hoyts cinema complex. Six new restaurants were welcomed to the centre, including well-known eateries Schnitz and The Groove Train. Hoyts itself also underwent a major refurbishment. This included new recliner seats installed in all of the cinemas and an overall modernisation of the complex. A new Ben & Jerry's ice cream shop opened near the entrance, in the old ticket box space.

The latest redevelopment saw the entire Level 1 space undergo a major renovation. New seating and lighting were added, and many new stores opened, although a few of the stores relocated to new spaces including Sculli Bros. and Chemist Warehouse, which were the major tenants in the redevelopment.

=== Myer controversy ===
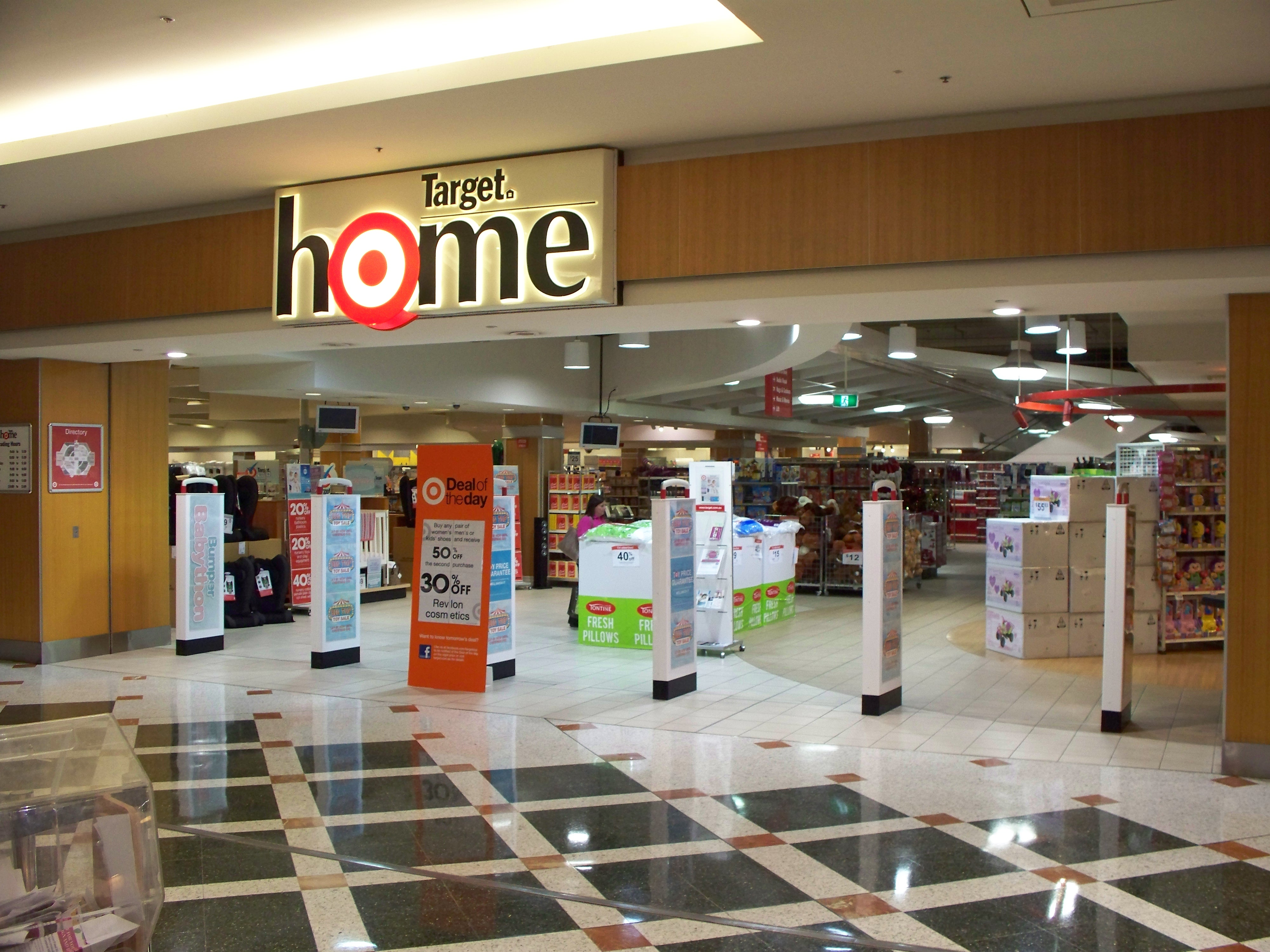
The Level 2 entrance to the Target store in Greensborough Plaza. This picture was taken in October 2012. Because both levels of floor space used to house a Myer department store, Target have a larger range of products here.

In September 1997, it was announced that the Myer department store was to be converted into an outlet for Target, as a Target Home concept store. Costing A$5 million (1997), the conversion was scheduled for completion by February 1998.

The store was converted after months of evaluation and market research, on account that the store was not satisfying consumer needs. According to research undertaken by the centre and Coles Myer at the time, customers were preferring to go to larger Myer outlets in the nearby suburbs of Preston (Northland) and Doncaster (Shoppingtown). Analysis also suggested that a Target outlet at the centre was more preferred by the centre's target market, and would boost visitors to the centre by 6%. The Greensborough Plaza location was the first Target store to be rolled out as part of the Target Home concept.

The change caused some significant controversy amongst retailers in the centre, who complained that they had rented in the centre on the key basis of Myer being an anchor tenant. Some in the centre had even considered taking legal action against then centre managers Lendlease, particularly in light of what they felt were inflated rent prices based on the stores' presence in the centre.

The situation between tenants and the centre managers continued to escalate, until a merchant group was formed in March 1998 to represent affected retailers in discussions with Lendlease. One long-time tenant of the shopping centre claimed that his rent had increased by 110% since the naming of Myer as a new anchor tenant in 1995.

The Myer store eventually closed on 17 May 1998, with Target opening in its place later that year. Target have since discontinued the Target Home chain and have removed the Target Home branding altogether, replacing it with the ordinary pre-2014 Target logo. As of 2021, Target Greensborough is the largest Target store in Australia.

=== Ownership ===
During the 1990s, the centre was part owned by both General Property Trust and then later MLC. Unlisted Lendlease managed trust, and the Australian Prime Property Fund was the other joint owner during this period. During both these owners, the centre was managed by Lendlease.

In 2000, MLC sold its stake in Greensborough to SAS Trustee Corporation (State Super) in an $80 million deal.

In 2005, the centre was owned by SAS Trustee Corporation and Australian Prime Property Fund. On 26 May 2005, Australian Prime Property Fund completed the purchase of SAS's 50% share in the centre for A$160 million (2005), giving it full ownership of the centre.

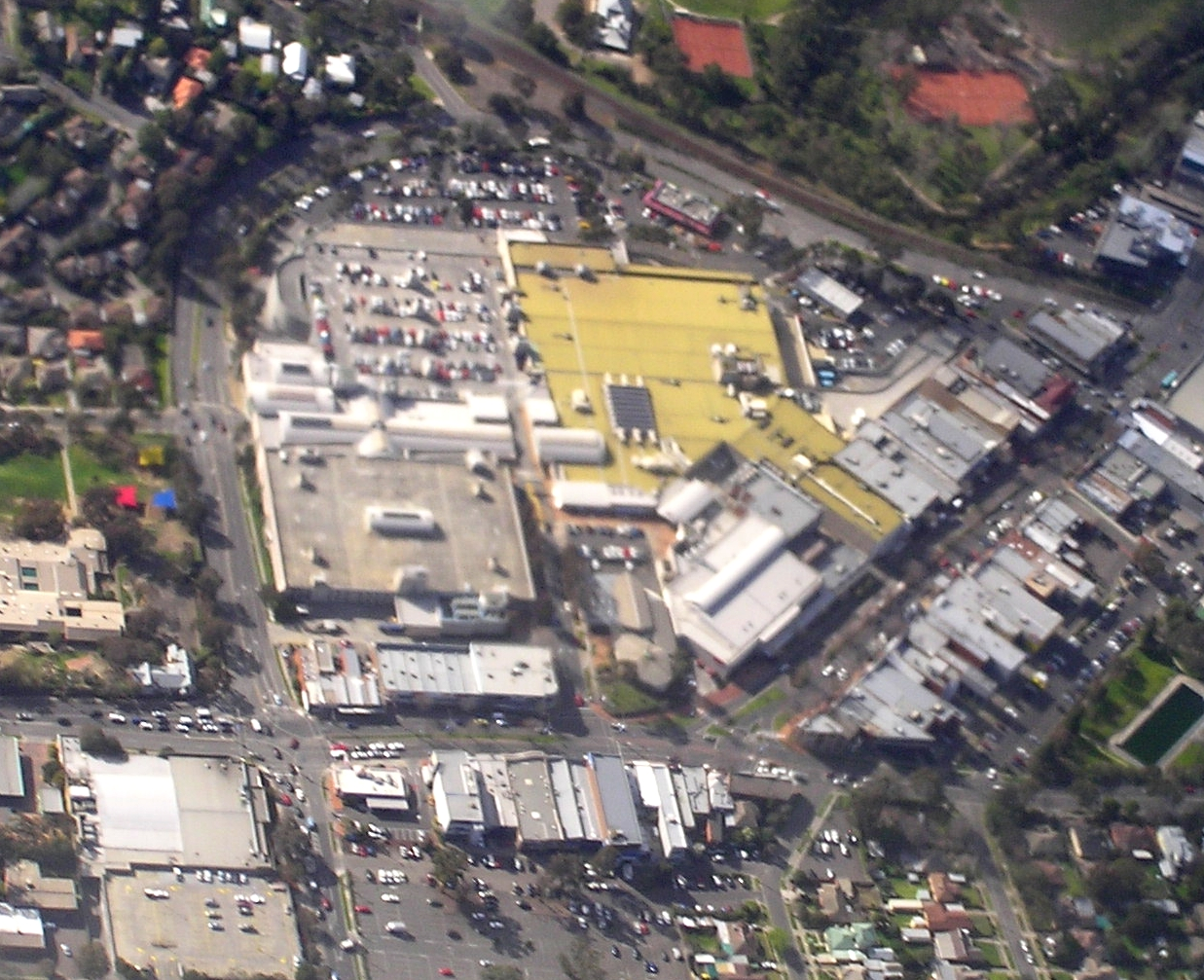
view from south

In July 2013, Greensborough Plaza was sold to Blackstone. In 2022, it was sold to 151 Property.

== Transport ==
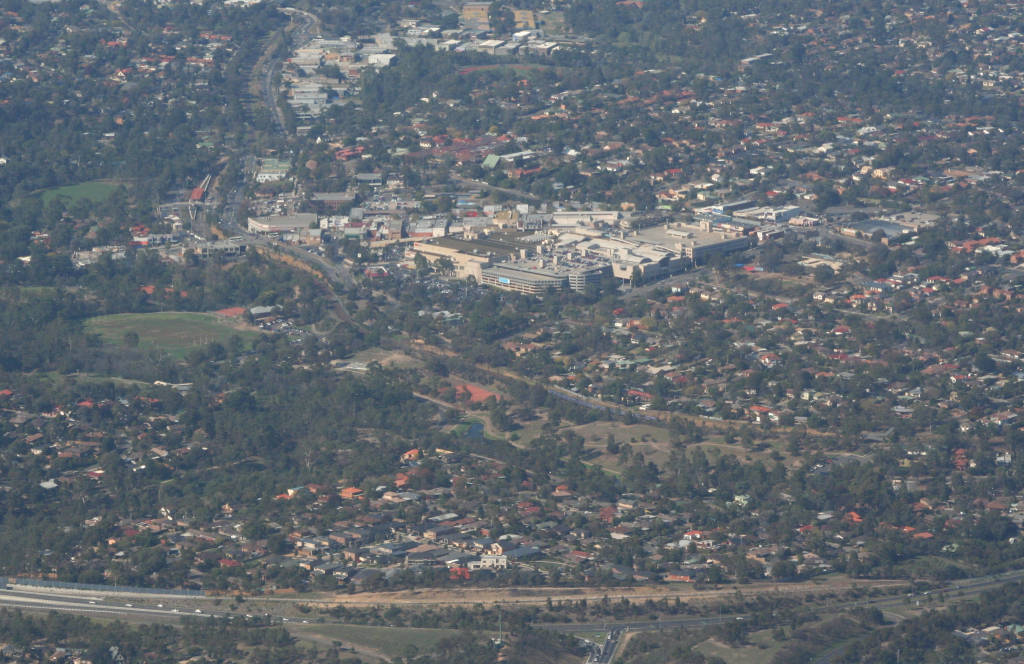
Aerial view of the suburb with Greensborough Plaza in the centre

Greensborough Plaza provides parking for around 2815 vehicles and is serviced by trains, 10 bus routes and taxis.

=== Parking ===
Adjoining the plaza is a seven-level multideck carpark (six levels undercover), accessible via The Circuit. An additional three levels of parking are located above the Target store (two levels undercover).

=== Public transport ===
Greensborough Plaza is directly serviced by SmartBus route 902 as well as seven regular bus routes (513, 517, 518, 520, 562, 563, 566, 343), with bus stops located outside the main plaza entrance on Main Street. A taxi rank is also located adjacent to the bus stops on Main Street. The stop for bus route 293 can be reached by a 200-metre walk north east from the plaza along Main Street. Greensborough railway station is located nearby and is a 500-metre walk east from the plaza to the station. SmartBus route 901 stops outside the station.
