= Target Australia =

Australian discount department store chain owned by Wesfarmers

Target Australia Pty Ltd
- Logo used since 11 July 2014

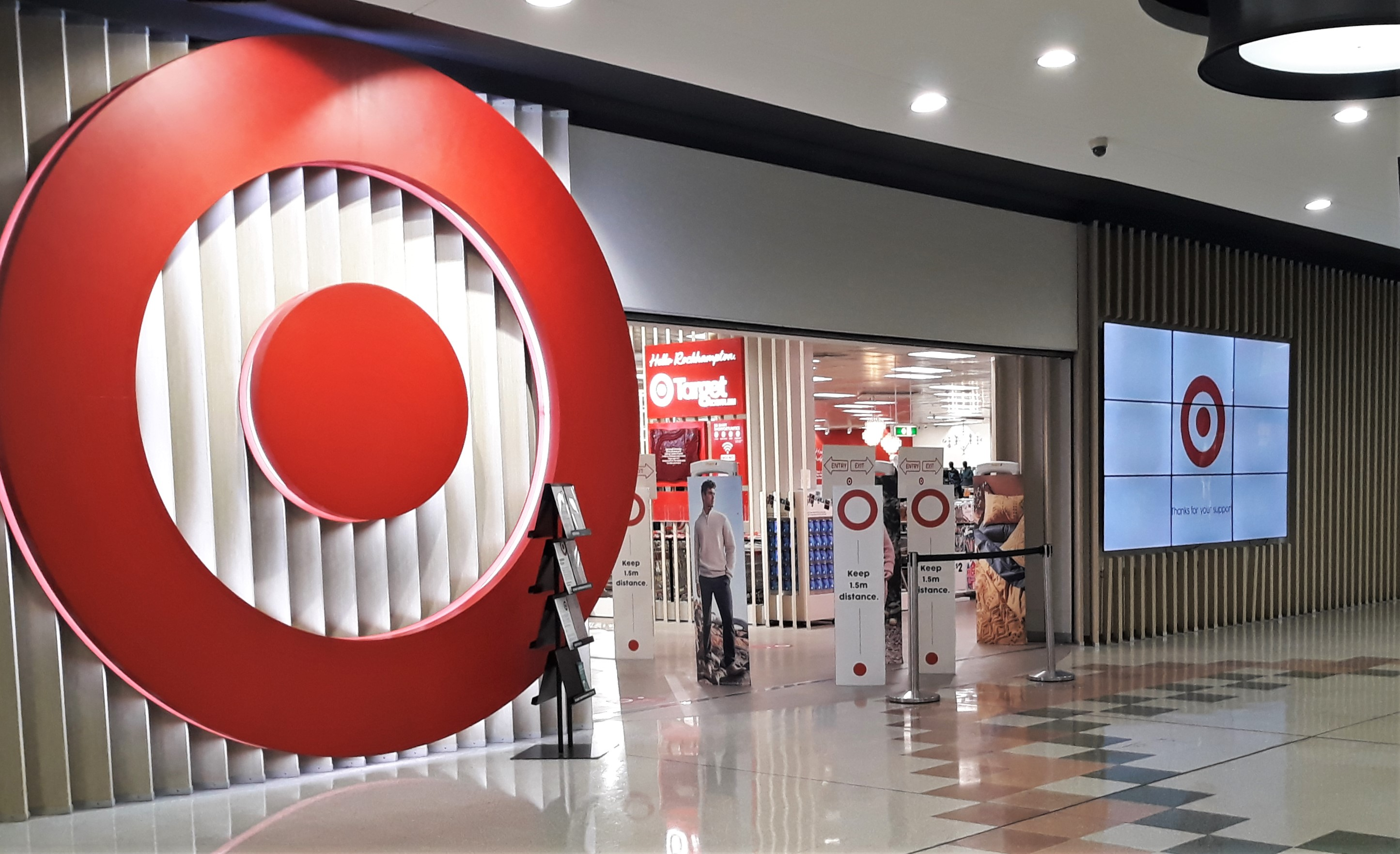
- Target store located inside City Centre Plaza in Rockhampton, Queensland
- Formerly: Lindsay's; (1926–1968); Lindsay’s Target; (1968–1970)
- Type: Subsidiary
- Industry: Retail
- Founded: 1926; 100 years ago (as Lindsay’s); 1968 (as Lindsay’s Target)
- Founder: George Lindsay; Alex McKenzie; Baillieu Myer (Target)
- Headquarters: Chadstone, Victoria, Australia
- Number of locations: 120 (2026)
- Key people: Aleksandra Spaseska (Managing Director, Kmart Group)
- Products: Clothing, cosmetics, homewares, electronics, books
- Revenue: ▼ A$2.68 billion (2020)
- Number of employees: 10,000 (2023)
- Parent: Wesfarmers
- Website: target.com.au

Target Australia Pty Ltd (formerly Lindsay's and Lindsay's Target, formerly stylised as Target. and doing business as Target and Target Australia) is a department store chain that is part of Kmart Group, owned by Australian retail conglomerate Wesfarmers. Target stocks clothing, cosmetics, homewares, electronics, books, and toys selling both in-store and online. The company was established in Geelong, Victoria as Lindsay's drapery store in 1926. In 1968, Myer Emporium purchased Lindsay's and rebranded to Lindsay's Target and in 1970, the name of the company changed to Target. Despite the identical logo and name and similar type of outlets, Target Australia have never had a direct relation or affiliation to the American retailer Target Corporation.

== History ==
=== Beginnings as Lindsay's ===
In 1926, George Lindsay and Alex McKenzie opened their first store in Geelong selling dress fabrics, bedding and furnishings. Lindsay began his retail empire five years earlier, running a store in Ouyen, Victoria, but moved to Geelong to increase the opportunity for growth. The company progressively established stores throughout Victoria, running with a policy of selling quality goods at half the normal rate of profit.

In 1968, Myer Emporium purchased the chain of 16 stores and renamed the company Lindsay's Target. Baillieu Myer was able to license the name and logo from the U.S. retailer. They moved into the South Australian market with the first "Target" store opening in Newton, South Australia in October 1970 with an aim to expand the business. The new discount department store quickly established itself throughout Australia, and within three years had stores in Victoria, South Australia, Queensland and New South Wales. In March 1970, Lindsay's" was dropped from the company name and the business was renamed Target Australia. The mainly Victorian-based "Lindsay's" stores, with the positioning of "Sell it for Less", were rolled into the "Target" discount department store group, now carrying over its leading position of quality soft goods to the larger Target discount department store format, while maintaining its base in Geelong.

By 1982, Myer was operating 27 stores under the Target brand, but sold 22 of them, with 14 going to GJ Coles & Coy Ltd.

=== Coles-Myer era ===
In August 1985, Myer Emporium Ltd and GJ Coles & Coy Ltd merged to become Coles Myer Limited. In 1996, Coles Myer merged the Target and Fosseys brands, and their first speciality store Baby Target was established. Then in 1998, their second speciality store, Target Home opened. Fosseys stores were later renamed Target Country, becoming the third speciality store under the Target name.

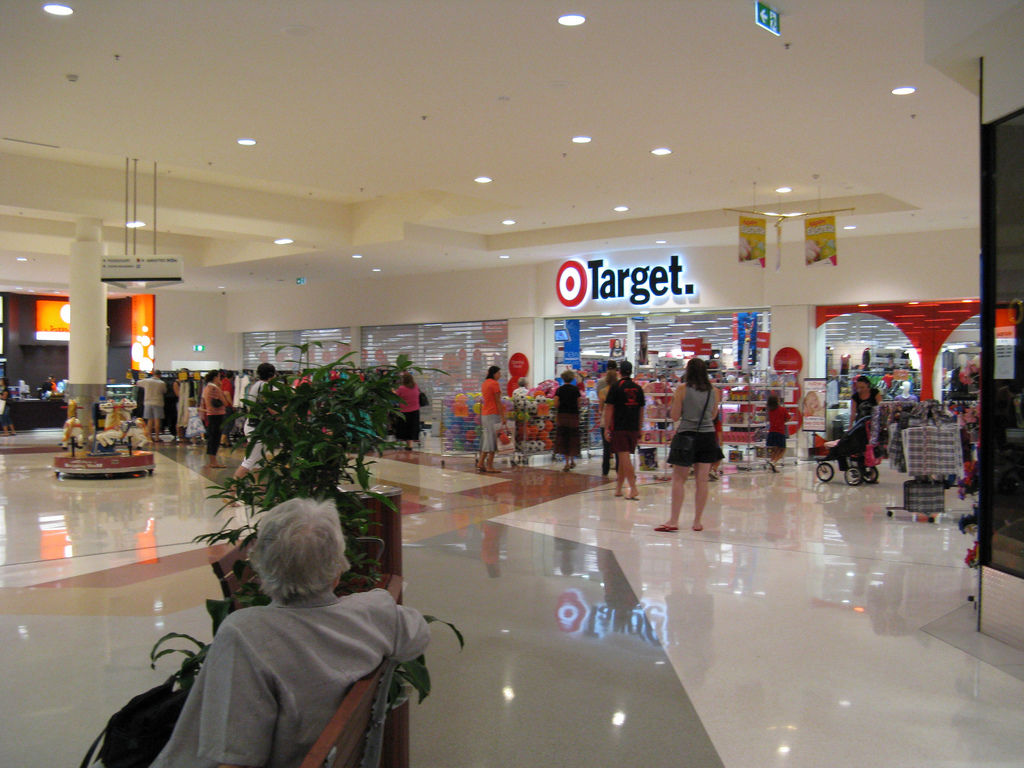
Former Target department store in the Castletown Shopping Centre, Townsville in 2008

In 2001, Target announced its first ever loss, to the sum of $43m. A new senior management team replaced the former, with Target repositioning itself from a store directly competing with Kmart and Big W, to a more stylish, up-market, but still value-for-money, alternative to speciality stores. Store fittings and layouts were altered to reflect this change and whole departments such as self-service confectionery and home decorator (paint) were removed from all stores. In 2006, Target appointed Launa Inman as managing director. She was named Telstra Businesswomen of the Year in 2003, as a result of her achievements as an apparel retail buyer for the company. Her work saw Target's $32 million loss at the end of 2000 turn into a $68 million profit 18 months later.

=== Wesfarmers era ===
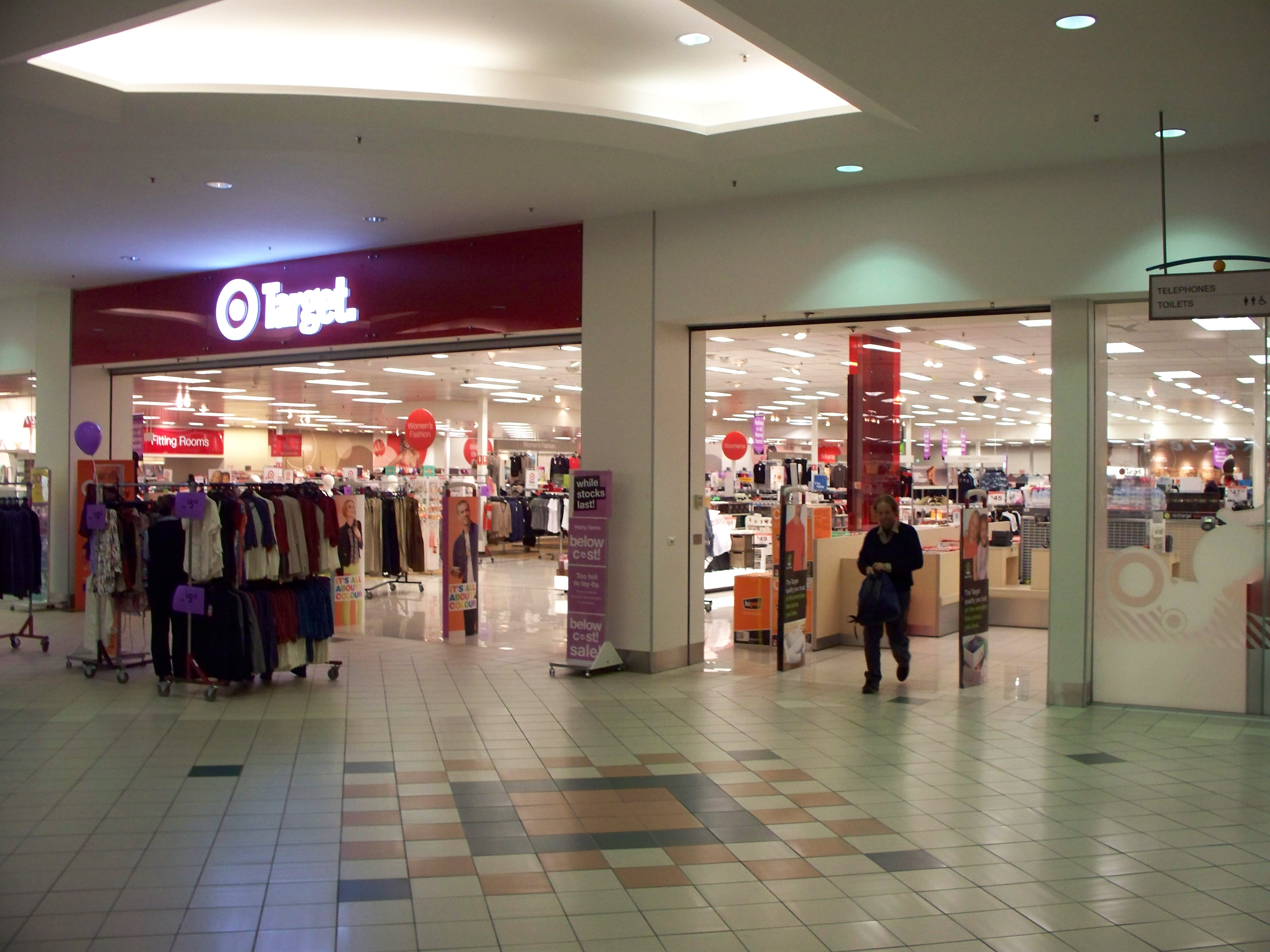
A former Target store, in the Northgate Shopping Centre, Glenorchy, a northern suburb of Hobart, in 2012

Prior to its November 2007 takeover of Coles Group, Wesfarmers stated in August 2007 that it would consider converting some Kmart stores to the Target brand.

In May 2009, Target stopped providing free plastic bags for its customers, but in 2013 reversed this decision. In November 2011, Dene Rogers, the former chief executive of North American retailer Sears Canada, replaced Inman as Target's managing director. However, by April 2013 Rogers had been replaced by former chief operations director at Coles, Stuart Machin.

In February 2016, Wesfarmers restructured Target and Kmart under a single department stores division known as the Kmart Group, headed by Kmart managing director Guy Russo. An accounting scandal that created $21 million in fraudulent profits was reported on 11 April 2016. Although it is not believed CEO Stuart Machin orchestrated or ordered the accounting irregularities, he took the blame for the scandal and departed Target.

In June 2016, at a Wesfarmers annual strategy briefing Guy Russo announced that Target would be exiting toy sales, pet care, and luggage. In the same year Target saw a loss of $195 million. According to Mr Russo, 20% of Target's 305 stores would be closed over a five year period. Target planned to market shift, becoming a "mid-tier" new boutique retailer, competing with the likes of foreign fast fashion giants H&M, Uniqlo and Zara.

Target announced in April 2016 it would relocate its Geelong head office to Melbourne, resulting in an unspecified number of redundancies. Following the April 2016 announcement, Wesfarmers confirmed in December that Target would relocate to Williams Landing in late 2018.

In June 2017, Wesfarmers announced that Target and Kmart would be merging some of their back-office operations including procurement. Some Target stores would be converted to Kmart stores while other Target and Target Country stores would be closed. As of 2020, Target had 284 stores throughout Australia: 191 Target stores, and 93 Target Country stores.

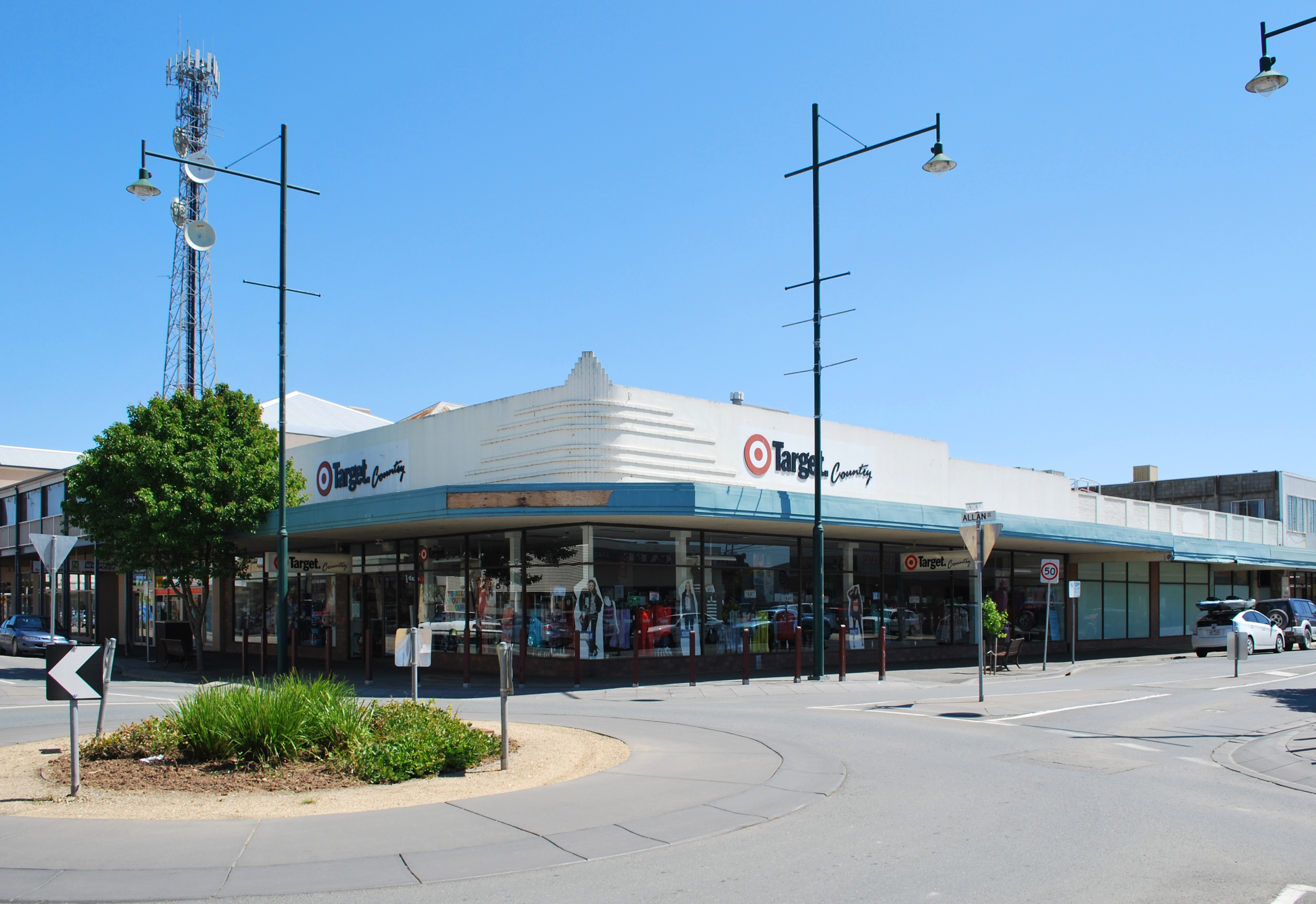
Target Country store in Kyabram, Victoria in 2012. This store closed in September 2020.

In May 2020, further store closures and consolidations were announced with up to 1,300 employees moving to other Wesfarmers businesses. The large restructuring of Target Australia, is a result of its parent company Wesfarmers, claiming that a changing retail landscape in which consumers are opting for "cheap and cheerful" products, mixed with some high-end purchases. The store closures and conversions were expected to last from early 2020 to early-mid 2021. The proposed changes were as follows:

- 10–40 Target stores were converted to Kmart.
- 10–25 other Target stores were closed.
- 52 Target Country stores converted to small-format Kmart stores, called K Hubs. The remaining 50 Target Country stores were closed.
- In total up to 92 Target stores were converted into Kmart stores with a whole total of 167 stores closed or converted.

Despite its great brand recognition, Target as a large-format retail offering was potentially cannibalising sales from sister group Kmart and did not offer a great enough point of difference compared to Myer and David Jones. On Target Australia's website, they attributed the cause of the closures as "improving the commercial viability of the business and to support the thousands of people we employ... we need to adapt our business — to make it smaller, more focused, less complex and more digitally enabled so we can better serve our customers both in store and online."

In July 2019, following an ABC investigation into the transfer of Uyghurs from detention and "re-education" facilities in China's Xinjiang region to factories across the country, Target Australia commenced a review of its supply chain to determine whether any of its suppliers had links to the alleged use of forced labour. The company stated that it was working with suppliers to verify the origin of its cotton and said it would take appropriate action if evidence of forced labour was identified.

In early 2022 Target had launched their new rebrand which they called "That's Target". Over the month of February they launched new ads that told a story of daily struggles of life and ended with the catch phrase such as "That's quality. That's Target".

In July 2023, Wesfarmers announced it would reorganise Target and Kmart internally and run them as one combined business.

== Store formats ==
=== Current store formats ===
==== Target ====
There are currently 120 Target department stores located throughout Australia that stock the full range of Target's products. Target is also pushing their online presence since the major closures. Each state and territory still has at least one Target store:

- Australian Capital Territory - 2 stores
- New South Wales - 31 stores
- Northern Territory - 1 store
- Queensland - 29 stores
- South Australia - 12 stores
- Tasmania - 3 stores
- Victoria - 29 stores
- Western Australia - 12 stores

=== Former store formats ===
==== Baby Target ====
In 1996, Target introduced Baby Target as a standalone store format specifically for baby products. The concept had limited success and was ultimately closed down soon after 2007/2008 when Baby Target stores have since been phased out to become larger Target stores, and still stock a larger range of baby products. Baby Target stores originally located in a number of locations in Australia including Werribee, Narre Warren, Northland, Victoria, Newcastle, Campbelltown and Golden Grove.

==== Target Country ====
Logo for Fosseys

Logo for Target Country

Fosseys was established in 1926 at George Street, Sydney by Alfred Bristow Fossey and grew to 148 stores throughout Australia, with an annual turnover of $300 million. As part of the acquisition of Grace Bros, which had purchased JB Young's of Queanbeyan who owned Fosseys, Coles Myer came to own Fosseys. Coles Myer used the Fossey’s brand to unify a range of smaller variety stores trading under a range of other names, including Coles Variety stores, which had been the foundation of GJ Coles & Coy Ltd.

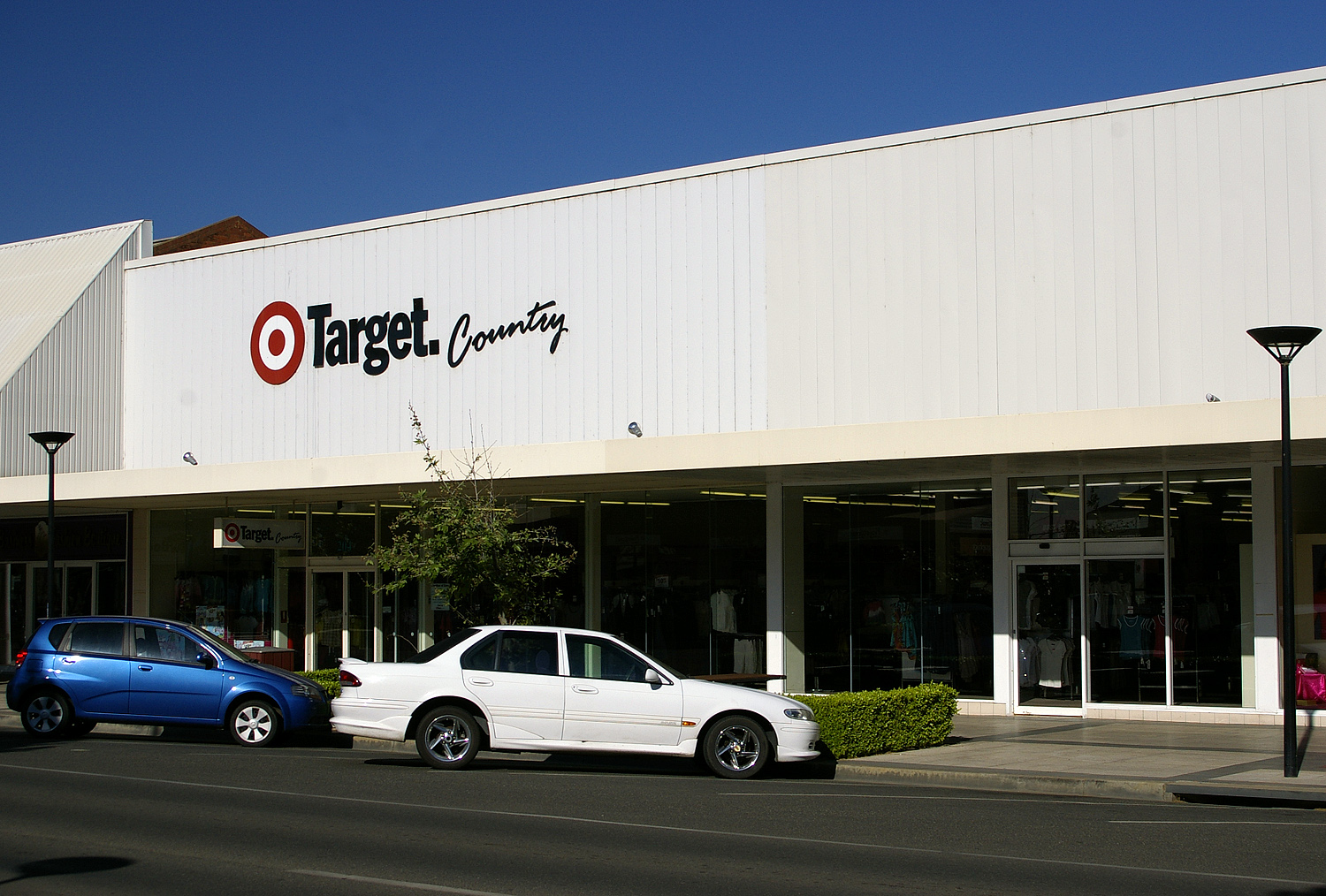
Former Target Country store formerly Fossey's store in Wagga Wagga, New South Wales

Coles Myer merged the operations of Fosseys with Target in 1996, redesigning Fosseys stores to focus on family apparel retailing in rural Australia. It also introduced Fosseys branded merchandise with attributes of value, convenience and confidence.

Fosseys stores began converting to Target Country in 1999, along with Fosseys stores being closed when they were in close proximity to a larger Target store. By 2001, all Fosseys stores located close to Target stores were closed; the remaining Fosseys stores, rebranded as Target Country, continue to focus on apparel sales in smaller towns without full-merchandise Target stores. The first Fosseys store to be rebranded as Target Country, was Target Country Wonthaggi (Relocated to a larger space, now Kmart) As of 1 July 2007, employees of Fosseys (Australia) Pty Ltd were transferred to Target Australia Pty Ltd, and Fosseys as a legal entity was dissolved. A store count at June 2008, there were 118 Target Country stores throughout Australia.

From the mid 1990s onwards, there was a rebranding of some Grace Bros stores in regional NSW to Target. This included a large number of stores which had previously been part of the Dubbo based Western Stores. Locations which converted from Grace Bros to Target and then Target Country include Bathurst, Cowra, West Wyalong, Forbes, and Young (all closed as of 2021).

Target Country store numbers were growing, and gained popularity in regional and remote communities, as Australians loved having access to the fashions and homewares of Target, which were increasingly popular and on price. Stores were refitted and mimicked the appearance of a larger Target store, along with the replacement of the Fosseys POS to Target “touchscreen” POS. As part of Target's 2020 restructuring Target Country stores have been closed or converted. The last Target Country store, Target Country Salamander Bay (NSW), closed its doors for the last time on 8 May 2021.

==== Target Home ====
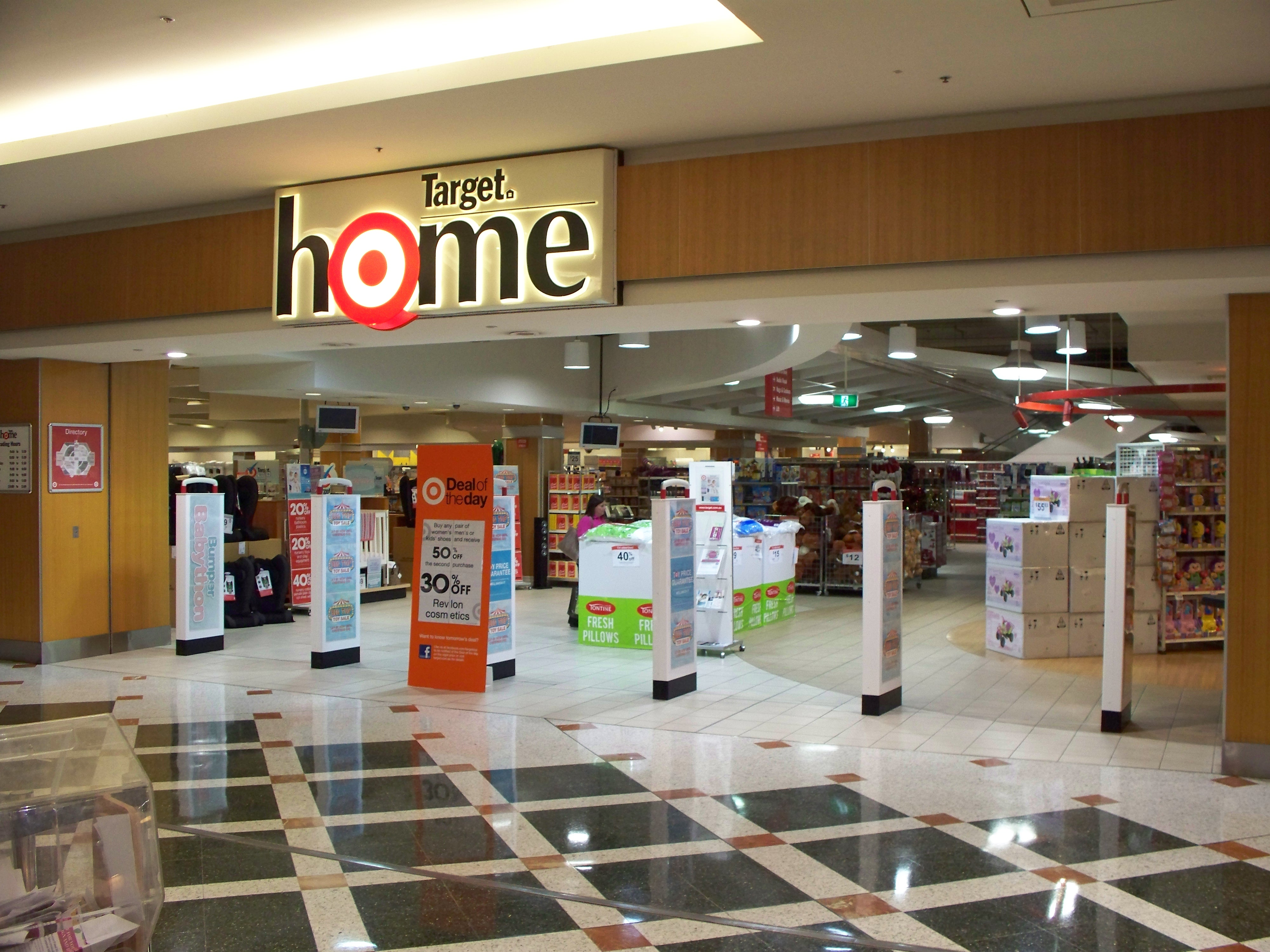
The largest Target store in Australia, located in Greensborough Plaza in October 2012. It was formerly a Target Home store.

Another format tried by Target was the homewares-themed store Target Home, introduced in 1998 but discontinued in 2000s. Target Home stores have since been phased out to become larger Target stores, and still stock a larger range of homewares in a number of locations in Australia including Lakeside Joondalup and Westfield Carousel in Western Australia, Castle Plaza in South Australia, Westfield Southland, Highpoint Shopping Centre (now Kmart) and Greensborough Plaza in Victoria and Westfield Warringah Mall (now Kmart) in New South Wales.

==== Target Outlet ====
Target Outlet was a format tried by Target in 2013 at the Target in Dandenong, Victoria at Dandenong Plaza. The format was discontinued around 2014.

==== Urban by Target ====
Urban by Target was a format tried by Target initially at South Yarra, Victoria at The Jam Factory, after taking over a closed Virgin Megastore. The format was introduced in 2010, with a second location opening in 2011, at Flemington, Victoria at Flemington Village. A third location was also opened in 2011, at Pasadena, South Australia, at Pasadena Shopping Centre. The format was smaller than a traditional Target department store and was focused on clothing and home wares. The location at Flemington was closed down, followed by Pasadena, which remained but converted into a traditional Target department store and was eventually converted to South Australia's first TK Maxx store. South Yarra was renovated with the new logo, in black instead of red for the iconic Target symbol, although this location was closed down permanently.

== Designers for Target ==
In March 2007, Target launched a 42-piece winter collection designed by Stella McCartney and Britney Spears. A number of metropolitan stores sold out of the range as soon as 10 minutes after opening, and items from the collection soon began appearing for sale on eBay at inflated prices. Another Stella McCartney collection was released in October 2010, to lesser fanfare.

In May 2007, Target announced its next designer range from Goot to a mixed reaction, and subsequently produced a collaboration with American designer Zac Posen in April 2008. In the same month, Australian fashion designer Collette Dinnigan released a range of lingerie labelled the 'Wild Hearts' collection.

In February 2012, Target launched a line of lingerie designed by American burlesque dancer and model Dita Von Teese. Throughout 2012, Target also announced designer collaborations for children with Collette Dinnigan and Ksubi and Roberto Cavalli for women. Target Australia and Dannii Minogue partnered on a clothing venture in 2014, called Dannii Minogue Petites. Dannii Minogue: the top selling item that has made her a success - Ragtrader.

In March 2016, Target launched a collection of women's, men's, children's and homewares by French fashion designer Jean-Paul Gaultier.

== Gallery ==
Logo used from 8 February 1986 to 11 July 2014, still used for outdoor signage

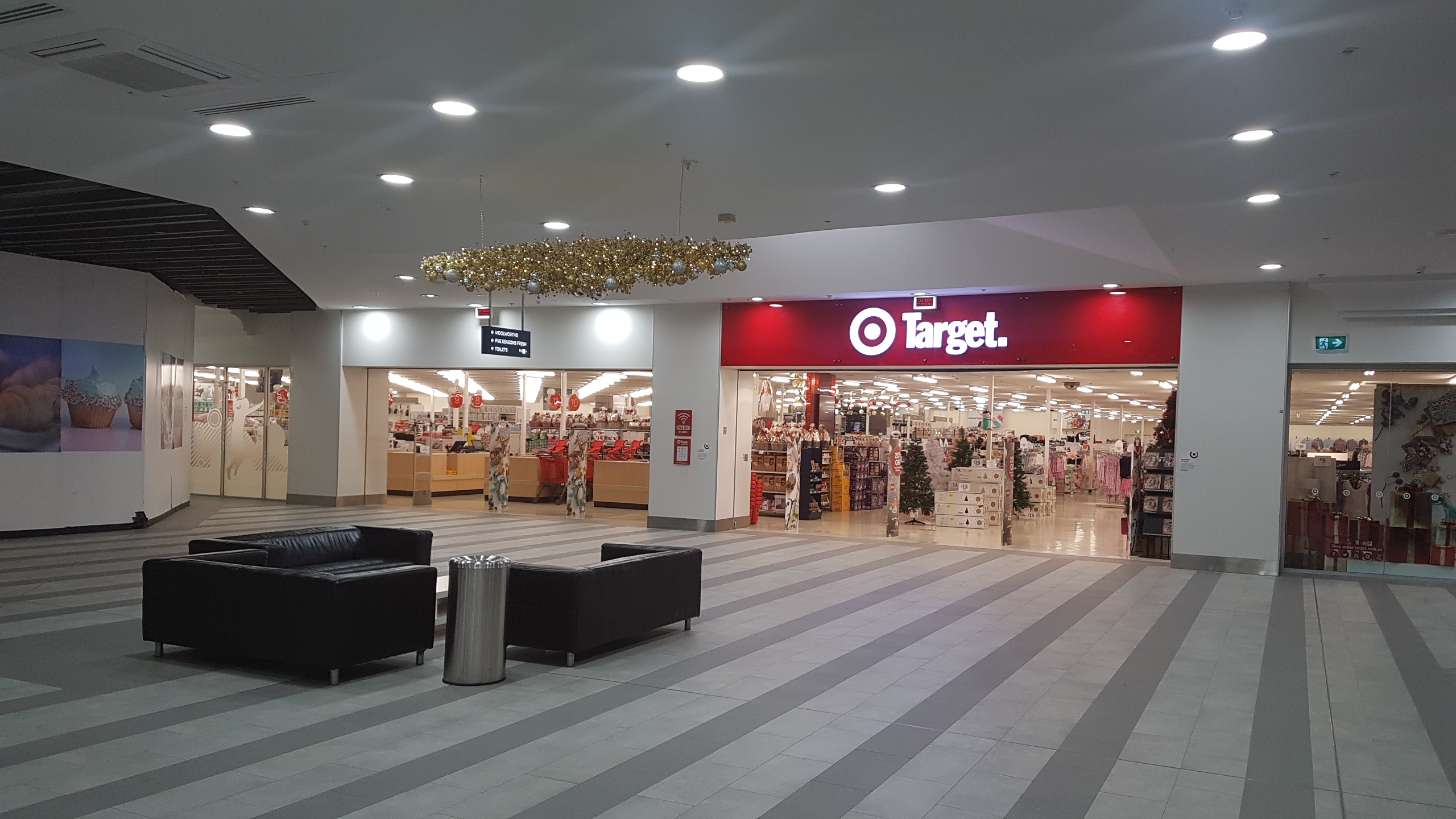
Target store in Stirling Central, Westminster, Perth, Western Australia. This store closed in June 2019.

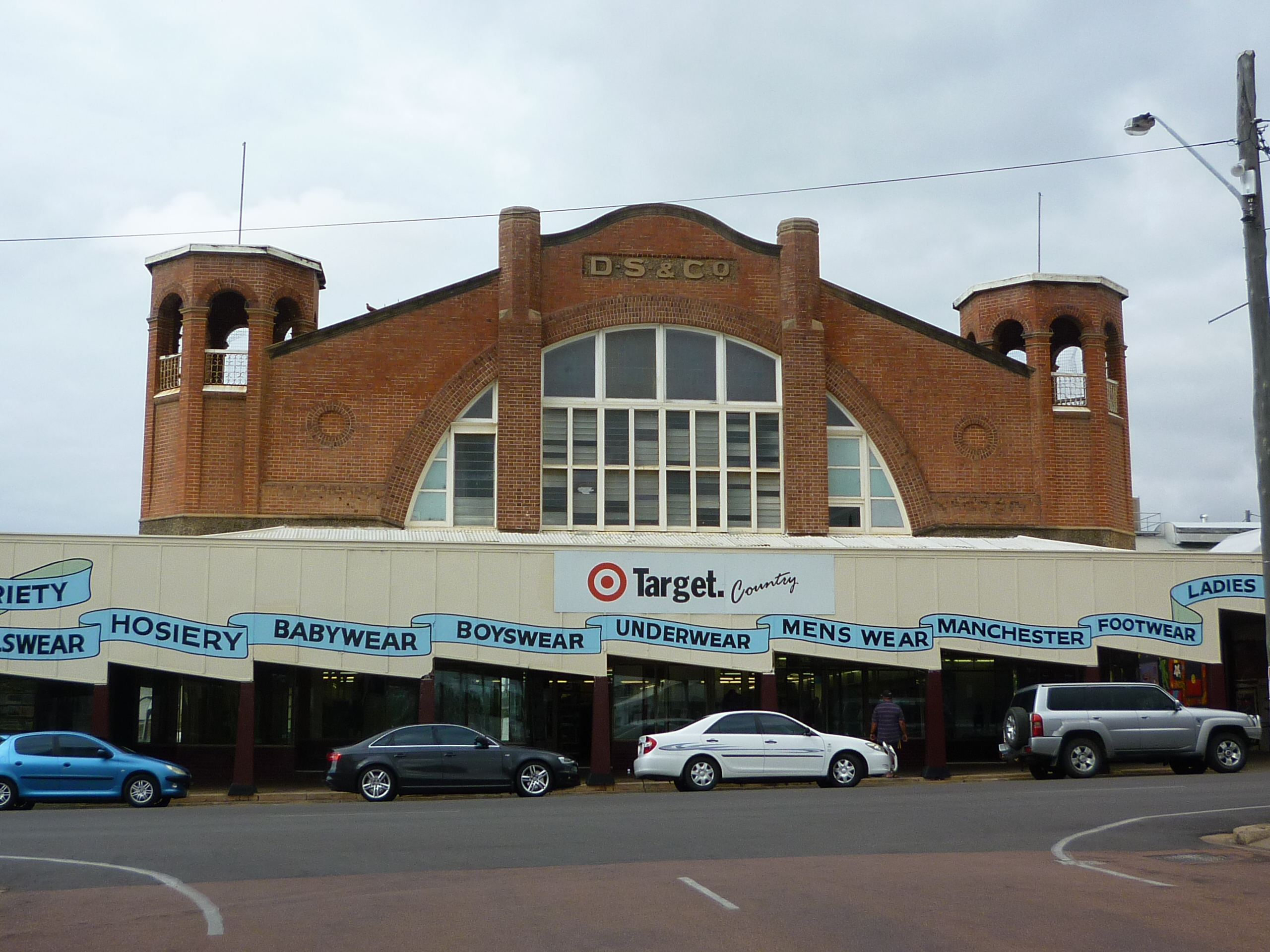
Target Country store in Charters Towers, Queensland. This store closed in early 2021 and is now a K hub store.

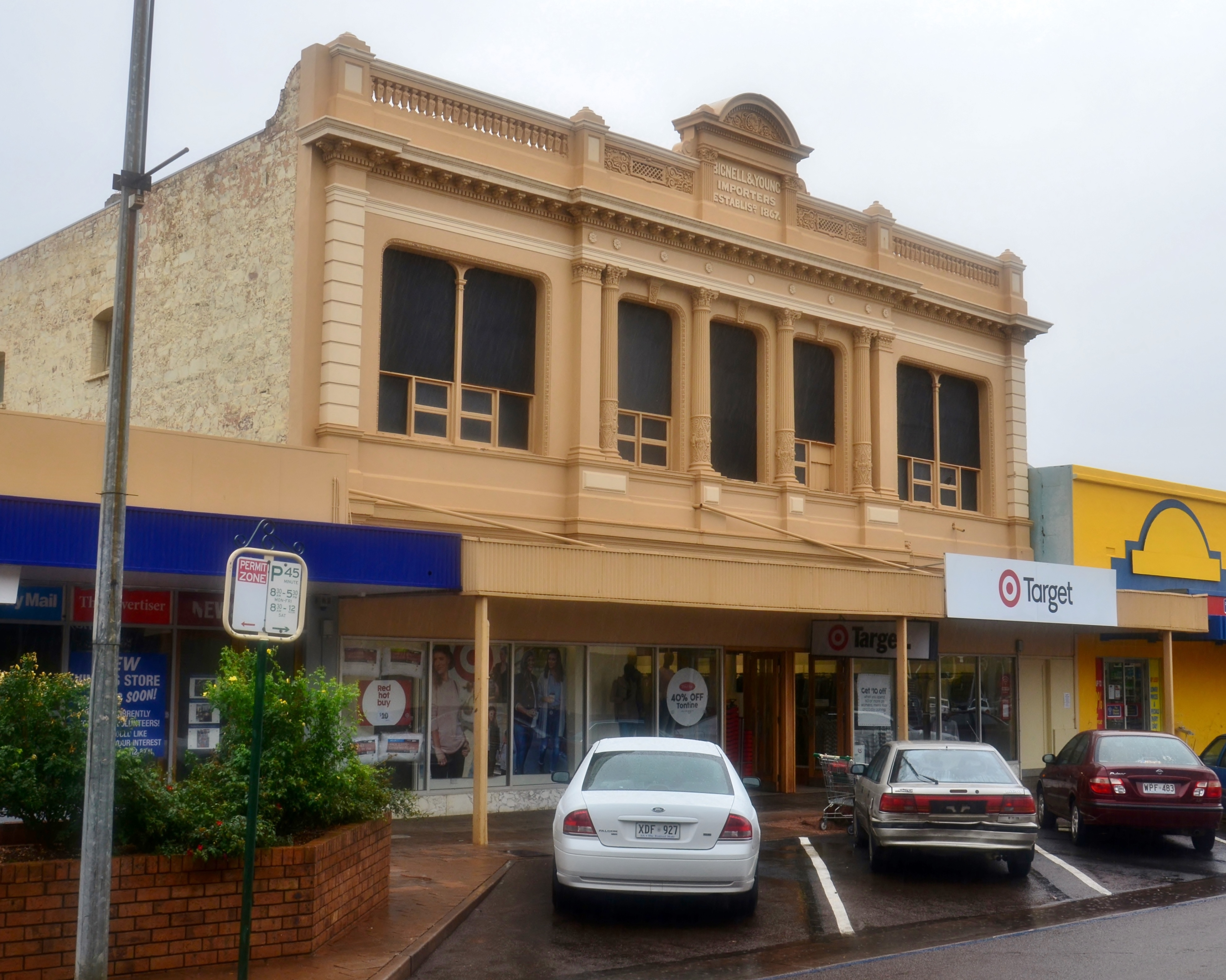
Target Country store in Port Augusta, South Australia pictured in 2017. This store closed in early 2021 and is now a K hub store.

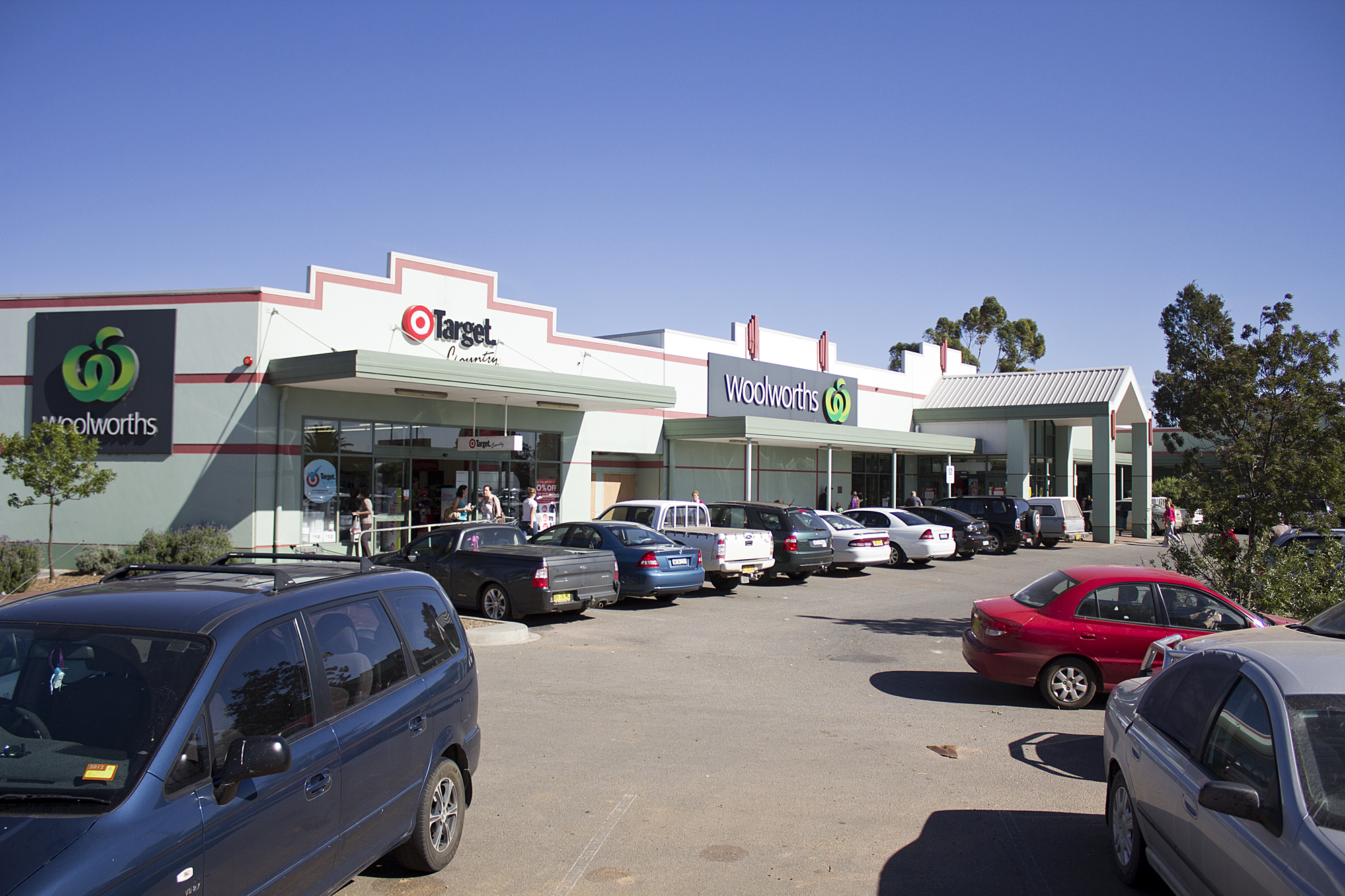
Target Country department store in Leeton, New South Wales. This store closed in January 2021.

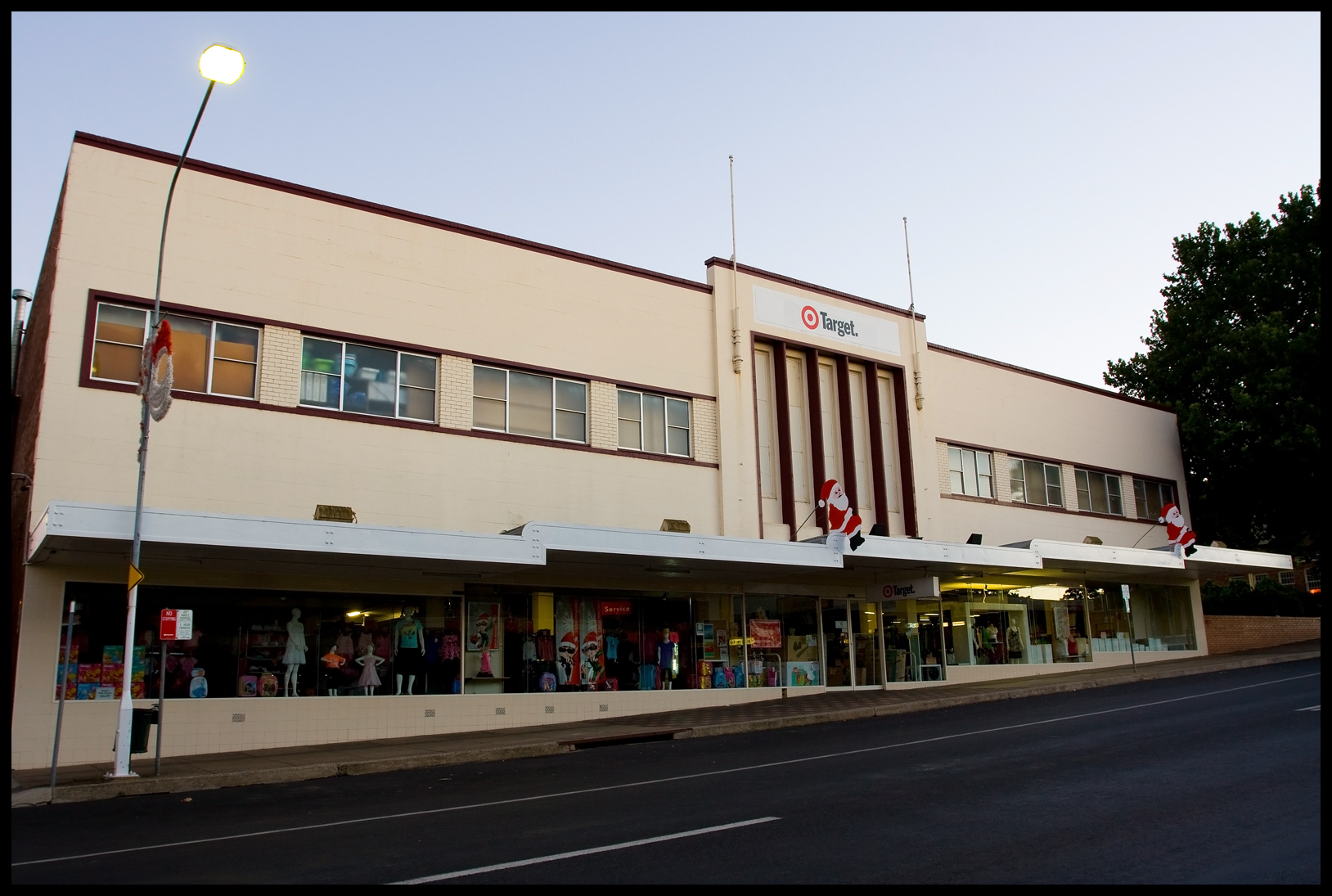
Target store in Cowra, New South Wales pictured in 2007. This store closed in August 2021.

== See also ==
- Department stores by country
