= Goot =

Goot is a surname. Notable people with the surname include:

- Alex Goot (born 1988), American singer-songwriter
- Josh Goot (born 1980), Australian fashion designer
