= Chadstone Shopping Centre =

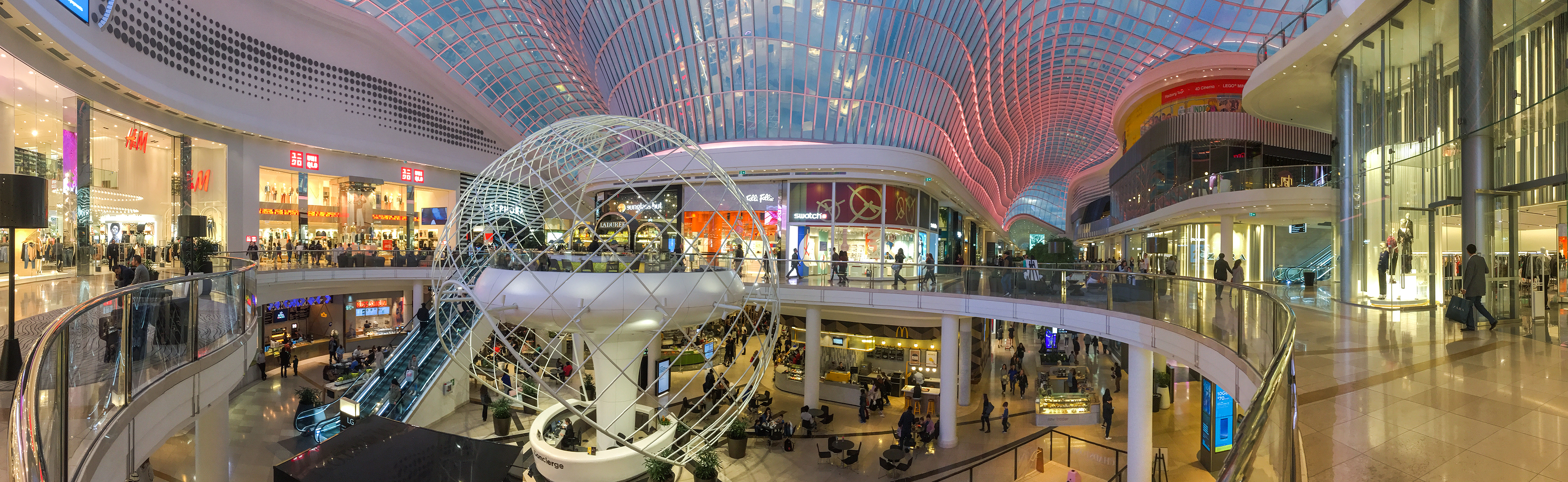
- Location: Malvern East, Victoria, Australia
- Coordinates: 37°53′16″S 145°04′57″E
- Address: 1341 Dandenong Rd, Malvern East VIC 3145
- Opened: 3 October 1960; 66 years ago
- Developer: Novion Property Group
- Manager: Vicinity Centres
- Owner: Colonial First State Retail Property Trust and Vicinity Centres (50%); Gandel Group (50%)
- Num. of stores: 530
- Num. of anchor tenants: 10
- Floor area: 230,442 m^{2} (2,480,457 sq ft)
- Floors: 5
- Parking: 10,944 spaces
- Website: www.chadstone.com.au

Chadstone Shopping Centre (colloquially known as Chaddy) is a major shopping centre in the south-eastern Melbourne suburb of Malvern East. It is the largest shopping centre in Australia.

== History ==
=== 20th century ===
==== Origins ====
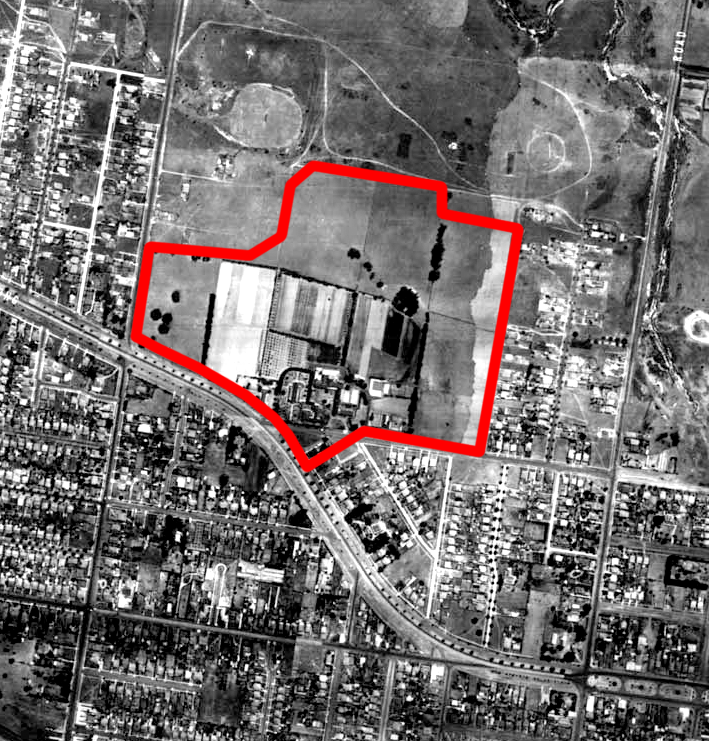
An aerial photograph of the area in which Chadstone Shopping Centre now stands, in 1945, with the current centre perimeter shown in red

The site of Chadstone shopping centre was once extensive paddocks of the Convent of the Good Shepherd on which cattle grazed until the mid-1950s. The initial 12 ha (30 acres) of land was sold to Myer in March 1958.

The development of Chadstone was driven by Ken Myer, who in 1949 looked to the US for the lead in retail developments, with decentralised centres fuelled by expanding suburban growth and car reliance. Further development of the concept occurred after Myer's 1953 visit to the US, where he met with a number of architects involved with the design of shopping malls. In 1954 Myer secured 35 ha (86 acres) of land in Burwood for a shopping centre. The Burwood site was ultimately not used for the project.

In 1958 the American firm of Welton Becket and Associates was appointed as the design architect, with Tompkins and Shaw Architects as the production architect. During the project the senior board of Myer was unhappy with the process, concerned that the architects did not understand the "Australian Concept", and were blindly adopting the American shopping mall model.

Construction of Chadstone Shopping Centre commenced in February 1959 at a cost of £6 million.

==== 1960s opening ====
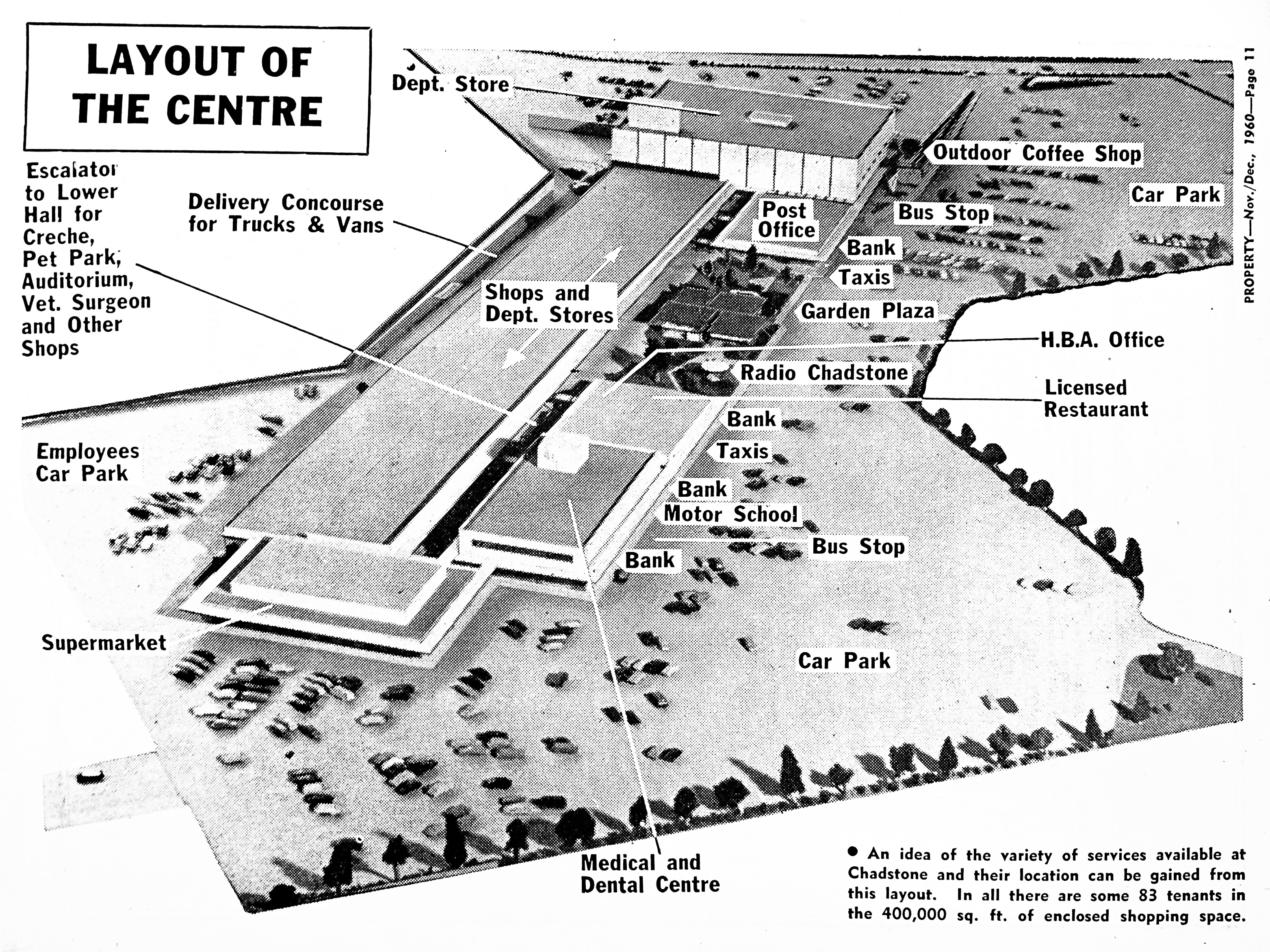
Layout, 1960

Chadstone Shopping Centre opened on 3 October 1960 by the Premier of Victoria Henry Bolte. It was the first self-contained regional shopping centre in Melbourne, and the largest built in Australia to that time. The centre was built and owned by the Myer Emporium, and marked the transformation of shopping in Australia from the traditional central city and strip-shopping precincts to the now familiar mall-type shopping centre.

The original shopping centre consisted of a single open-air mall covering 32,999m² with an upper mall concourse connecting to a partial lower retail area on its north end. The southern end contained a three-level 14,214m² Myer department store and the northern end contained a Dickins New World supermarket with stores connecting both ends. It followed the US pattern of shopping malls. The total number of stores in the shopping centre was 73 which included Foy & Gibson, Buckley & Nunn, McEwans Hardware, Patersons Home Furnishings, a G.J. Coles & Coy variety store. One side of the Upper Mall concourse contained a single row of stores at the centre of the complex and on the opposite side contained a large open area known as Garden Plaza which included an Indoor Garden pavilion and glass-enclosed kiosk which housed a studio for radio station 3UZ.

Since its opening Chadstone Shopping Centre came with a motto as a "one stop & shop" facility which provided services such as a public auditorium, medical and dental centre, post office, veterinary clinic and a child-minding centre. The first development made to the centre was when the fourth floor was added to Myer in March 1963 bringing the total floor space to 18,581m². In 1964, an American-style bowling alley known as Chadstone Bowl was added underneath Myer. It was the first subterranean bowling alley to exist in Australia.

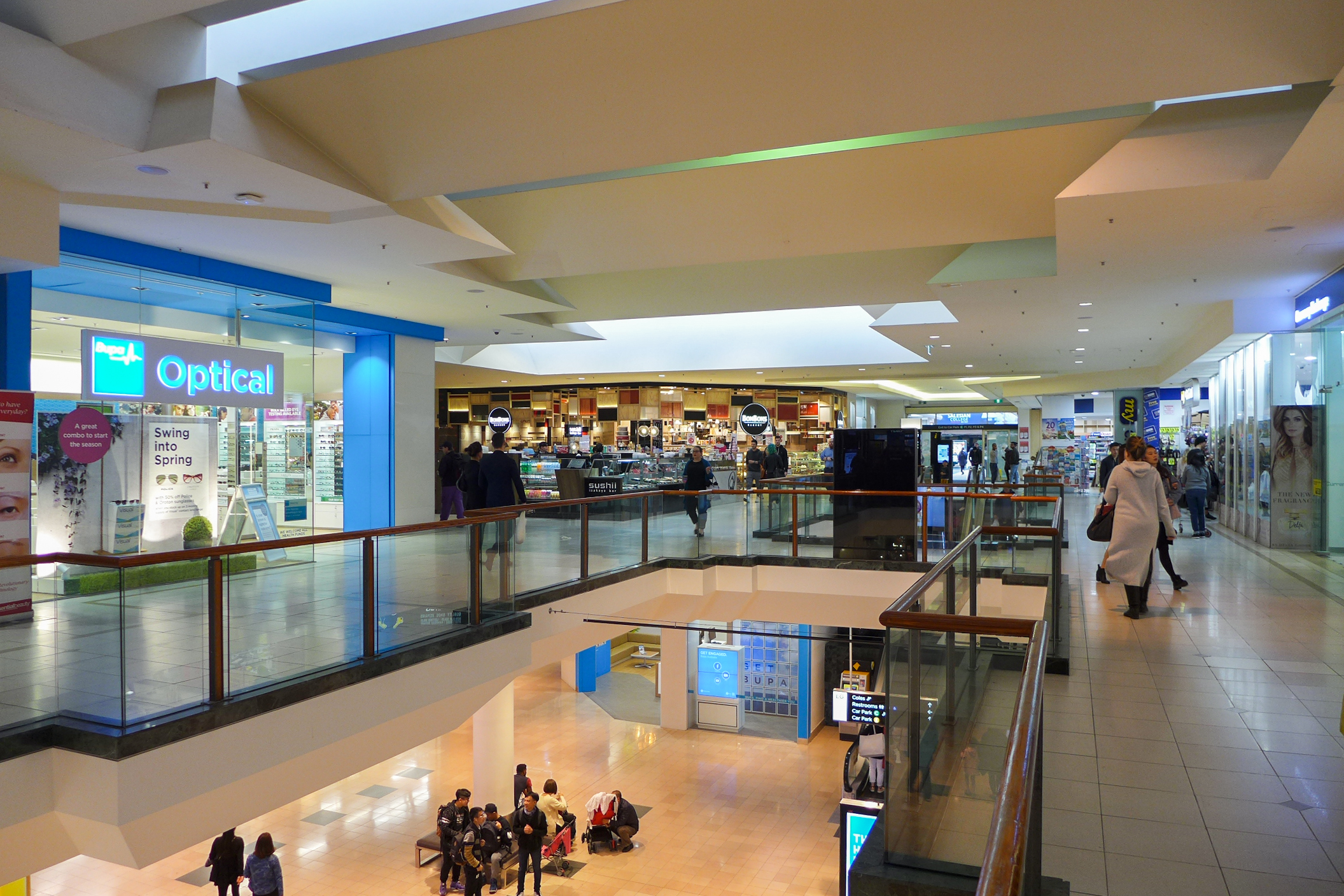
GF shops in first major expansion area

==== 1980s ====
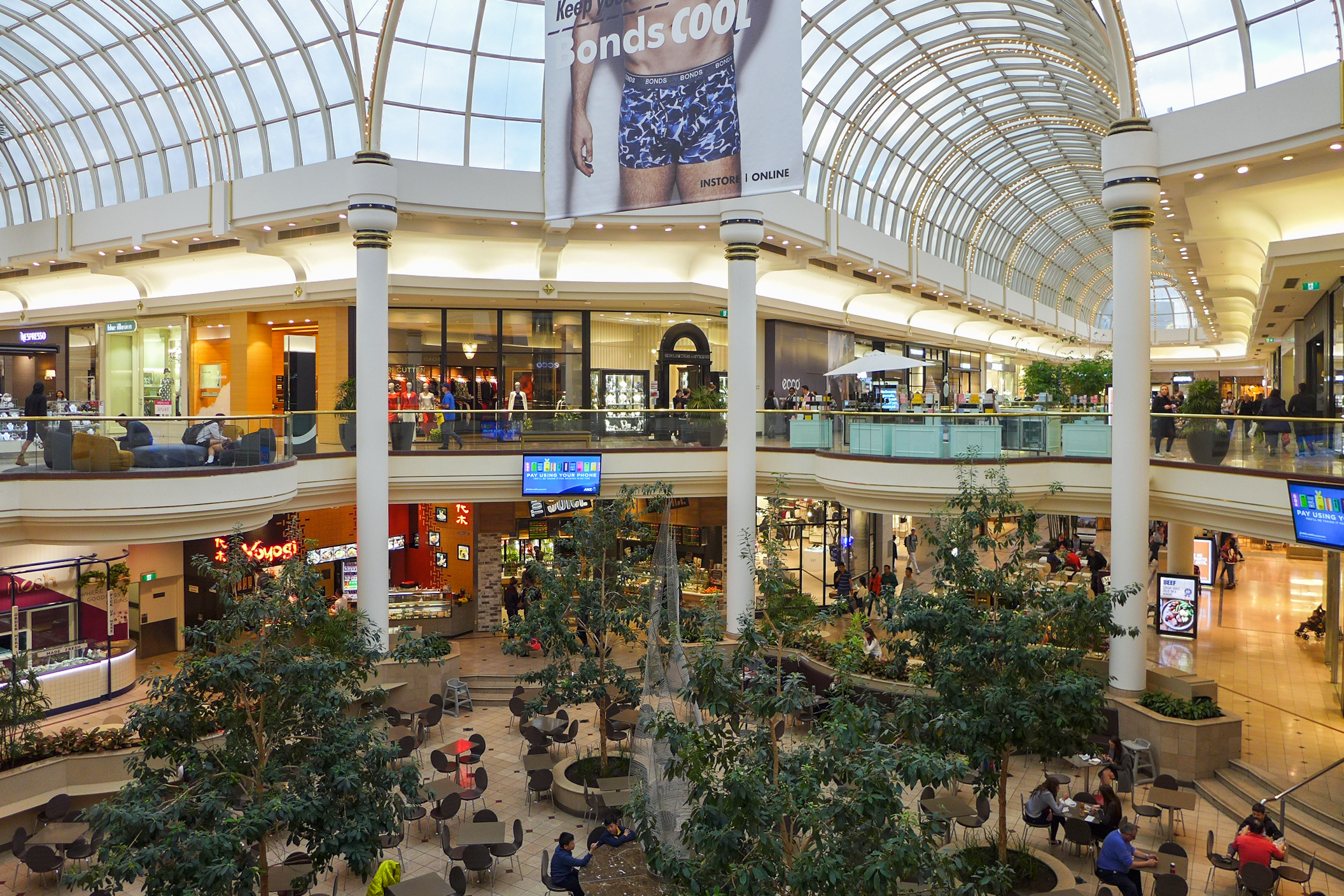
Atrium, completed in 1980s

In 1982, the Dickins supermarket was renamed to Coles New World.

In March 1983, the Myer Emporium sold the shopping centre to the Gandel Group for $37 million. Gandel Group has since managed and developed the complex.

Since the change of ownership, a three stage redevelopment was unveiled. The first stage of the development was the first ever major change made to the centre. In 1984 the mall was roofed over with translucent fibreglass, an acknowledgement that the open-air mall did not suit the Melbourne climate.

In 1985 stage two of the redevelopment went underway which involved the demolition of the Coles New World supermarket, and a new two-level northeast wing was constructed, which contained a new Coles supermarket which opened in October 1985.

Stage three involved the construction of a two-level mall on the original Dickens-Coles New World supermarket site known as the Entertainment Zone. An 8,993m² Target discount department store opened on the upper floor in late 1985. On 13 December 1986, an 8 screen Hoyts Cinema Complex opened in the space below Target.

In 1989, Bi-Lo was added as part of an expansion of the fresh food area.

==== 1990s ====
In 1990, The Galleria Mall was built which included Australia’s first food court and additional speciality stores were added. In 1991, the first office spaces were added to Chadstone Shopping Centre.

In April 1994, Sydney based Colonial First State Retail Property Trust acquired a 50-percent interest from the Gandel Group.

The 7,200m² Kmart discount department store opened on 10 July 1995 as part of the Chadstone Corner precinct. Also, in that same year the first of six multi-storey car parks were built.

In 1996, a two-level Loop Mall was built along the southeastern side of the centre. Its vaulted-roof concourses are parallel with the glass-enclosed atrium. This brought the total retail floor area to 93,999m² and the total number of stores to 325.

In September 1997, the Myer store at the southern end of the centre was demolished and replaced by a two-level curving wing anchored by two newly built department stores. A three-level 22,492m² Myer department store and 20 speciality stores opened in November 1998. The three-level 15,143m² David Jones department store and 40 speciality stores opened in November 1999. This expansion costed $150 million and took two and a half years to complete. It brought the total floor area to 126,785m² and the total number of stores to 385. Also, in December of the same year, Hoyts multiplex was expanded to 17 screens.

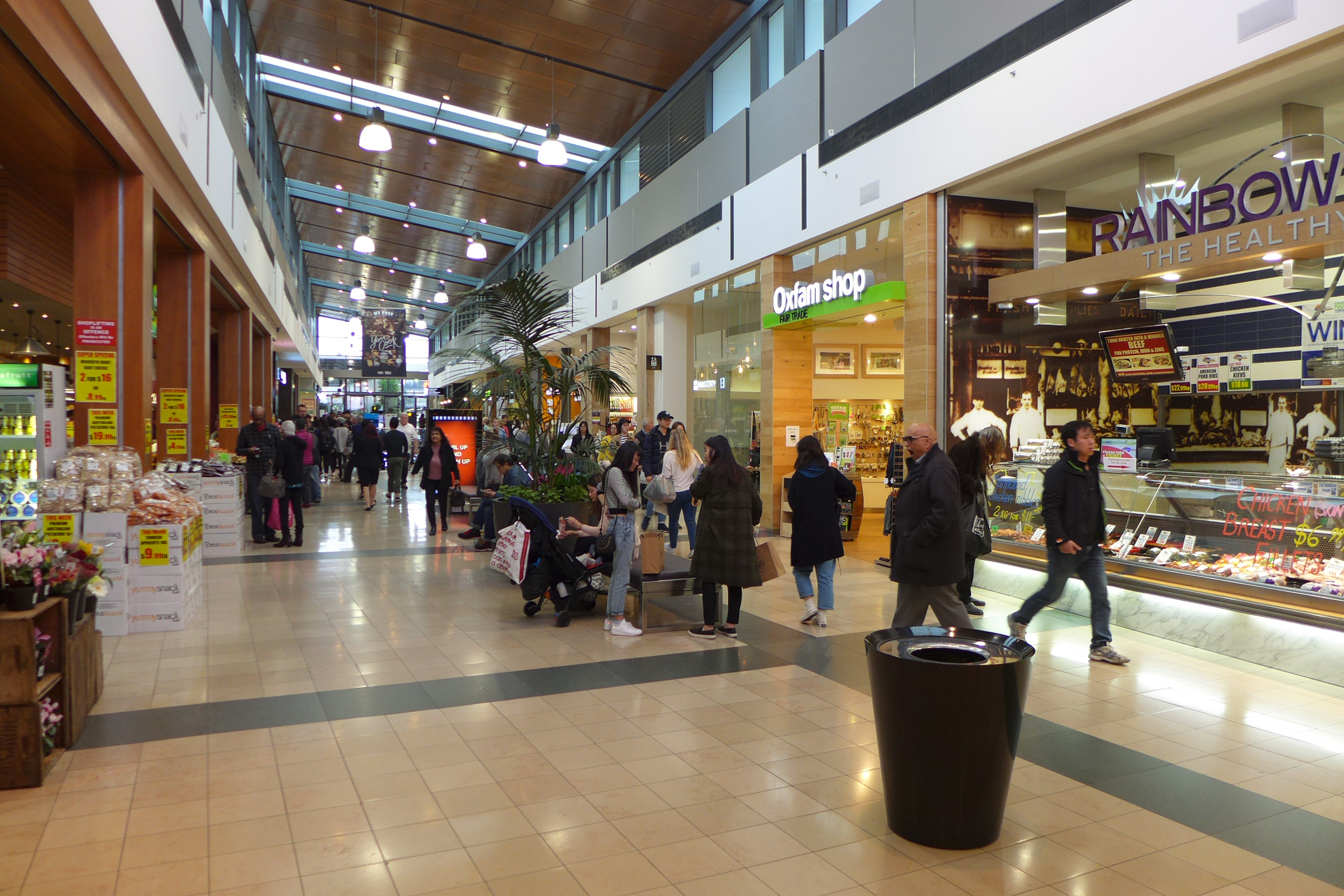
GF shops to Chadstone SC Bus Interchange

=== 21st century ===
==== 2000s ====
In the year 2000, the entertainment precinct opened to complement the newly expanded Hoyts Cinema Complex. The entertainment precinct offered a Timezone arcade, a relocated bowling alley now known as AMF Bowling and 16 food outlets including Boost Juice, McDonald's, Nando's and Pancake Parlour.

In June 2001, Borders opened its store in the West Mall section.

In January 2003, a $100 million redevelopment was planned. The centre's owners wanted to extend Chadstone's lettable area to 171,217m², with the intent of the centre to reclaim the title as the "largest shopping centre in Australia".

Chadstone held the title of the "largest shopping centre in Australia" from its original opening day to November 2002. when it was overtaken by Westfield Knox after their expansion was completed. Chadstone's main local rivals are Westfield Doncaster to the north, Westfield Knox to the east and Westfield Southland to the south.

In February 2007, a $100 million redevelopment commenced. The new extension took place on the old Bi-Lo supermarket and fresh food site which closed on 4 March 2008.

The new extension dubbed "Chadstone Place" opened on 29 October 2008. It featured the first location of a rebranded Woolworths supermarket to open in the state, an Aldi supermarket, First Choice Liquor, a Dick Smith Electronics Concept Store, Petbarn, two new health clubs (Contours and Fitness First Platinum) and a crèche. A four storey office tower opened as well.

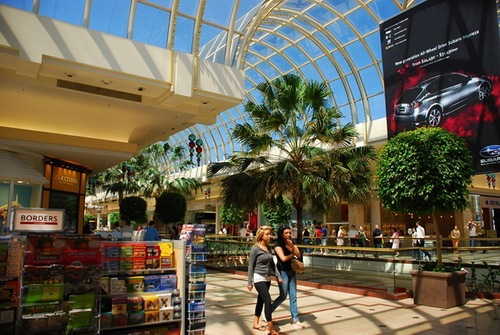
Interior view of the centre, prior to the 2007-2009 extension

In June 2008, a $270 million redevelopment commenced. It involved a complete reconstruction of the West Mall which was the oldest section of the centre. The stores in the West Mall from Sportsgirl to Borders were shut from 31 May 2008.

The development also included redesigning the roads leading into Chadstone to allow for better traffic flow into the centre. As part of the development an independent community group launched and maintained a website to keep track of construction developments. The State Government refused to impose a condition sought by the Stonnington Council calling for a transport study by the Government and Gandel, including the possible construction of a rail link.

On 22 August 2009, a new two-level mall containing 50 new stores including Sportsgirl, Portmans, Esprit, Witchery were opened. The celebration launch was attended by MTV host Ruby Rose, musician Axle Whitehead and model Cassie Van Den Dungen. On 18 November 2009, a new luxury wing featuring a golden strip of luxury retailers were officially opened. Twelve international fashion houses now have stores at Chadstone including Louis Vuitton, Gucci, Prada, Chanel, Miu Miu, Tiffany & Co, Ralph Lauren, Hugo Boss, Omega, Burberry, Tapestry and Jimmy Choo. The overall redevelopment costed up to $288 million, brought the total floor area to 175,600m² and the total number of stores to 530.

After that development Chadstone has reclaimed the title of the "largest shopping centre in Australia" and the "largest shopping centre in the Southern hemisphere".

==== 2010s ====
On 20 August 2011, managing director of Colonial First State Global Asset Management, Darren Steinberg, announced a proposal to expand Chadstone's floor area to 221,217m² on the oldest part of the centre to the north and construct two buildings of up to 14 storeys on its southern boundary facing Princes Highway. Up to 60,000m² of floor area would be revamped and an extra 25,000m² added. The proposal includes a new four level mall surrounding the feature atrium and the expansion of the existing mall. A new central bus interchange and more parking are part of that proposal.

In December 2011, the proposal was finalised and the development would cost $500 million. The proposal included two new levels of space for international retailers, a new Hoyts cinema, entertainment centre new food precincts, a hotel and office building up 14 storeys high fronting the Princes Highway. An extra 1400 parking spaces were proposed as well.

The redevelopment plans were supported by an independent planning panel in July 2012 and approved by the City of Stonnington on 14 August 2012. On 10 November 2012, the centre's redevelopment plans were given the final approval from the State Government.

However, despite the approvals given from the City of Stonnington and the State Government construction did not begin immediately due to disputes in the proposed construction hours. In May 2013 Colonial First State took the City of Stonnington to the Victorian Civil and Administrative Tribunal (VCAT) to argue against proposed conditions.

The CFS Retail and Gandel Group given the final approvals for the $580 million redevelopment works in May 2014. Early works and demolition began in June 2014. Target, Hoyts Cinema, Timezone arcade, the food court and many shops around the entertainment precinct excluding AMF Bowling closed on 10 June 2014 to make way for the redevelopment.

Construction on the $580 million expansion began on 2 September 2014 with the first sod turned over by Premier Denis Napthine.

On November 25th, 2013, Muji opened its first Australian store. On the 29th of August, 2019, Muji would relocate to the former Toys R Us location, making the Chadstone store the largest in Australia. Winning Appliances opened in the former Muji location on December 21, 2019 .

On 5 October 2014, the AMF Bowling alley closed down after 50 years of operation in the centre. The closure sparked controversy as AMF were unaware of the redevelopment plans until they saw the plans themselves and Gandel Group having informed AMF that they were not included in the redevelopment plans, despite having another four years left on their lease agreement.

On 10 September 2015, the new relocated Target store on the lower ground floor opened. It features a cafe, digital photo kiosk, instore clothing alteration service, t-shirt printing station, a dedicated denim zone, a "Happy Lab" confectionery area, and click and collect service.

On 13 October 2016, the first stage of the $660 million redevelopment of Chadstone opened. The new northern expansion was marketed as "The New Chadstone" with the new section featuring a four-level glass-roofed atrium on "racecourse" style mall with new retail and leisure precinct. Over 60 new stores were added including a flagship two level H&M, Uniqlo and Zara stores and as well as Sephora and Topshop. The redevelopment added two new food precincts. A new 1300-seat, 26-tenant food court known as "Food Central" which includes a McDonald's, KFC, Hungry Jack's and Schnitz outlet and a dining precinct on level one known as "The Dining Terrace" which includes Neil Perry’s Burger Project, Fonda Mexican and New Shanghai restaurants The new state-of-the-art Hoyts Cinema complex opened on level two above "The DIning Terrace".

The $660 million redevelopment added 11,000m² of retail space, and as well as a 17,000m² 10-level office tower, new bus interchange and an additional 800 car park spaces, taking total car spaces to 10,090.

Legoland Discovery Centre indoor theme park was later announced to open as part of the new development. This is the first Lego themed attraction for Merlin Entertainments in the Southern Hemisphere. It opened on level two next to Hoyts on 18 April 2017.

On 22 April 2017, Culture Kings opened their seventh national store on the lower ground floor.

Construction on the $130 million 250-room M Gallery by Sofitel hotel began in May 2018 and officially open on 1 November 2019.

==== 2020s ====
In December 2019, plans for a $685 million redevelopment was unveiled. It was subsequently approved on 6 July 2020 with works expected to start in early 2021 and completed in six stages by mid-2025. The plans were to add more than 1400 parking spaces across two carparks, a new nine level commercial office building on Middle Road, expansion of the dining, entertainment and leisure precinct, upgraded fresh food precinct and further expansion of the luxury mall.

Construction work began in February 2021 with the addition of two new levels of parking on top of the existing David Jones carpark. 850 parking spaces were added with more 400 spaces solar shaded on the rooftop to generate 1.6MW of electricity. The carpark upgrade was completed in September 2021.

Construction on the $71 million 10,350m^{2} expanded dining, entertainment and leisure precinct known as The Social Quarter commenced in September 2022. The Social Quarter had its grand opening on 1 March 2023 and features 13 new dining outlets including and 4 new entertainment offerings to complement the existing Hoyts Cinema and Legoland Discovery Centre. These include Archie Brothers Cirque Electrique, Strike Bowling, Holey Moley and Melbourne's first Hijinx Hotel all owned by Funlab. The new dining outlets includes Piccolina Gelateria, White + Wong’s (including their rooftop Sardine Bar) and UA Brewing Co. which features an onsite brewery producing craft beer exclusive to The Social Quarter.

In October 2022, the $485 million redevelopment construction of the One Middle Road commercial tower, fresh food precinct known as The Market Pavilion and expansion of Car Park C (Coles carpark) has commenced. On 18 December 2023, Coles and Aldi supermarkets have reopened after months of refurbishment. Woolworths temporarily closed its store to make way for the redevelopment on 4 February 2024.

The Market Pavilion and One Middle Road Tower had its grand opening on 27 March 2025. The 26,500m^{2} Market Pavilion Precinct features a new large Woolworths supermarket and 50 new retailers. A new Dining Laneway precinct featuring 11 outlets adjoining The Market Pavilion opened. An upgraded Car park C opened and featured an additional level of carpark or office and retail workers during the week and visitors on the weekend. The new nine storey One Middle Road Tower offers 20,000m^{2} of office space, a skygarden, a childcare centre and a health and wellness facility.

== Tenants ==
Chadstone Shopping Centre has 230,442m² of floor space. Major traders are David Jones, Myer, Kmart, Target, Aldi, Coles, Woolworths, Cotton On, Culture Kings, H&M, Sephora, Uniqlo, Zara, Muji, Apple, Rebel, JB Hi-Fi, Archie Brothers Cirque Electriq, Hijinx Hotel, Holey Moley, Strike Bowling Bar, Legoland Discovery Centre and Hoyts Cinema.

== Transport ==
Chadstone Shopping Centre

General information
- Location: Eastern Access Road, Malvern East; City of Stonnington; Australia
- System: Transport Victoria bus stop
- Owner: Department of Transport and Planning
- Bus routes: 15
- Bus stands: 10

Construction
- Structure type: At-grade
- Accessible: Yes―step free access

Other information
- Station code: 47923
- Fare zone: Myki Zone 1&2 overlap
- Website: Stop 47923
Location

Chadstone Shopping Centre has a bus interchange with 10 bus routes to nearby suburbs including Chadstone and Caulfield. It is served by CDC Melbourne and Ventura Bus Lines.

There is no direct train station at Chadstone Shopping Centre. The nearest railway stations are at Hughesdale and Oakleigh on the Pakenham and Cranbourne lines and Holmesglen and East Malvern on the Glen Waverley line. Buses provide direct connections to these stations.

Chadstone Tourist Shuttle operates multiple daily transfers for customers and tourists from Federation Square to Chadstone Shopping Centre and back.

Chadstone has multi-level carparks with 10,944 spaces.

== Incidents and accidents ==
- Just after 1:30pm on 19 December 2018, a car was engulfed into flames in the lower-ground carpark near David Jones. The fire spread to 10 other cars and there was significant damage to the carpark itself. The carpark was evacuated; however, the remainder of the centre was not affected. Around 12 fire trucks and 40 firefighters worked to contain the blaze and brought it under control just before 2:30pm.
- Around 9:20am on 8 September 2023, emergency services were called a construction site in the centre after a man in his 30s was trapped. The accident involved a cherry picker. The man was taken to The Alfred Hospital with crush injuries to his upper and lower body.
- Around 3am on 3 December 2023, a thief broke into a luxury watch and jewelry store and stole around $2 million worth of luxury watches. The same store was targeted again on 25 May 2024 around 4am when four masked offenders broke into the store and ran off with a number of items, although no prestige or high-value watches were taken this time as they were stored in the safes following the first incident. A security car collided with the offender's vehicle as they made their high-speed getaway. However, it was not enough to stop the thieves' car and they escaped.
- On 25 February 2025, a 15-year-old boy was bashed and robbed by a group of four in the food court around 4pm. The offenders tried to steal clothing from the teenager but instead stole the victim's phone.
- Around 1:30pm on 28 May 2025, a brawl between two men occurred. One of the offenders had a baton before they fled outside the centre. A police officer was struck on the head with a spanner as he attempted to chase the two men through a nearby park. Both men were taken into custody after incident.

== Gallery ==
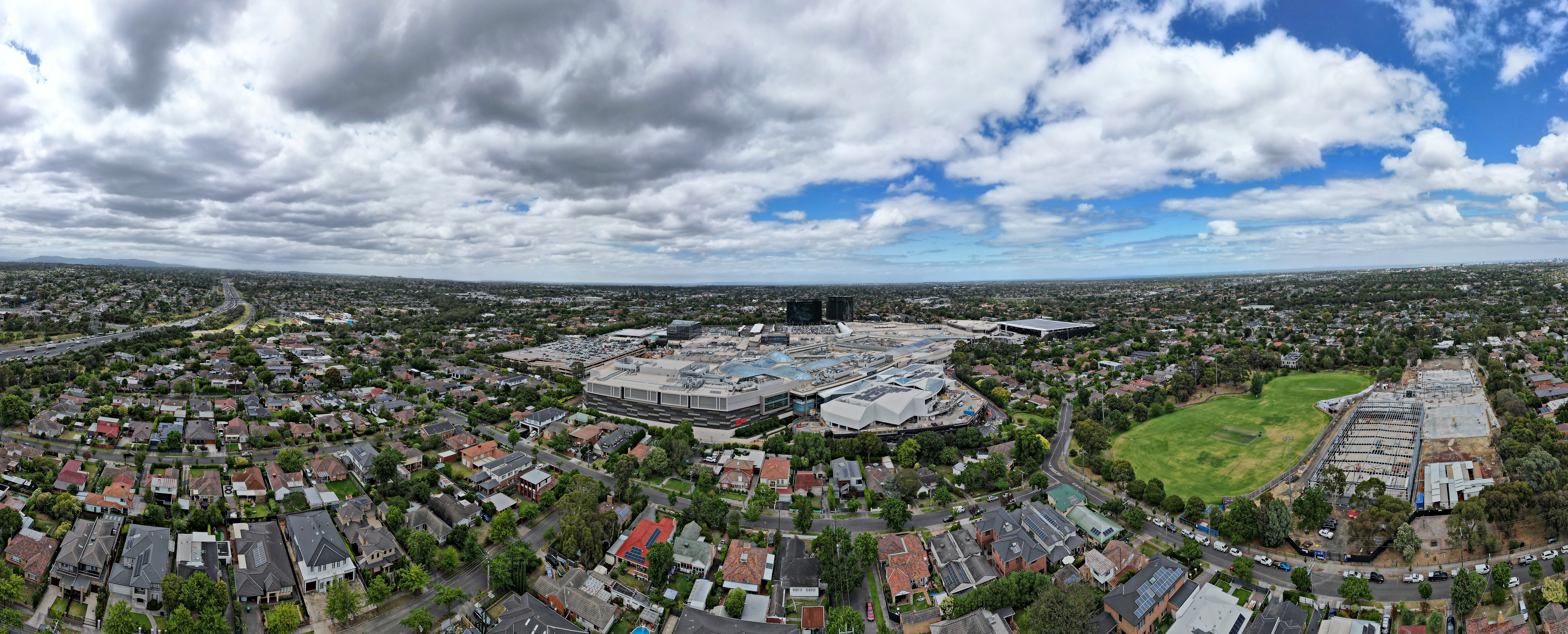
Aerial panorama of Chadstone Shopping Centre and its surrounds

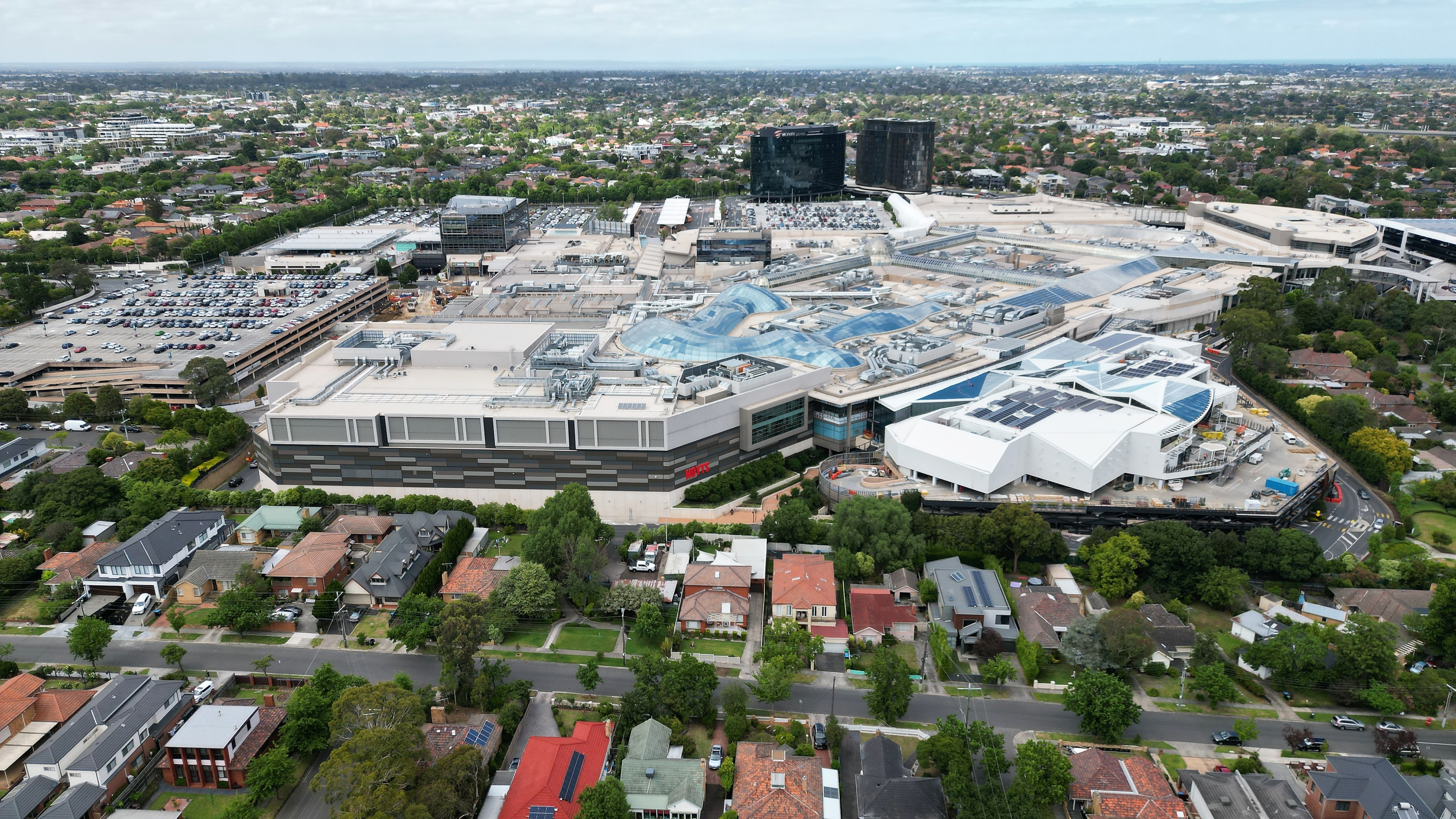
Chadstone Shopping Centre aerial perspective facing south

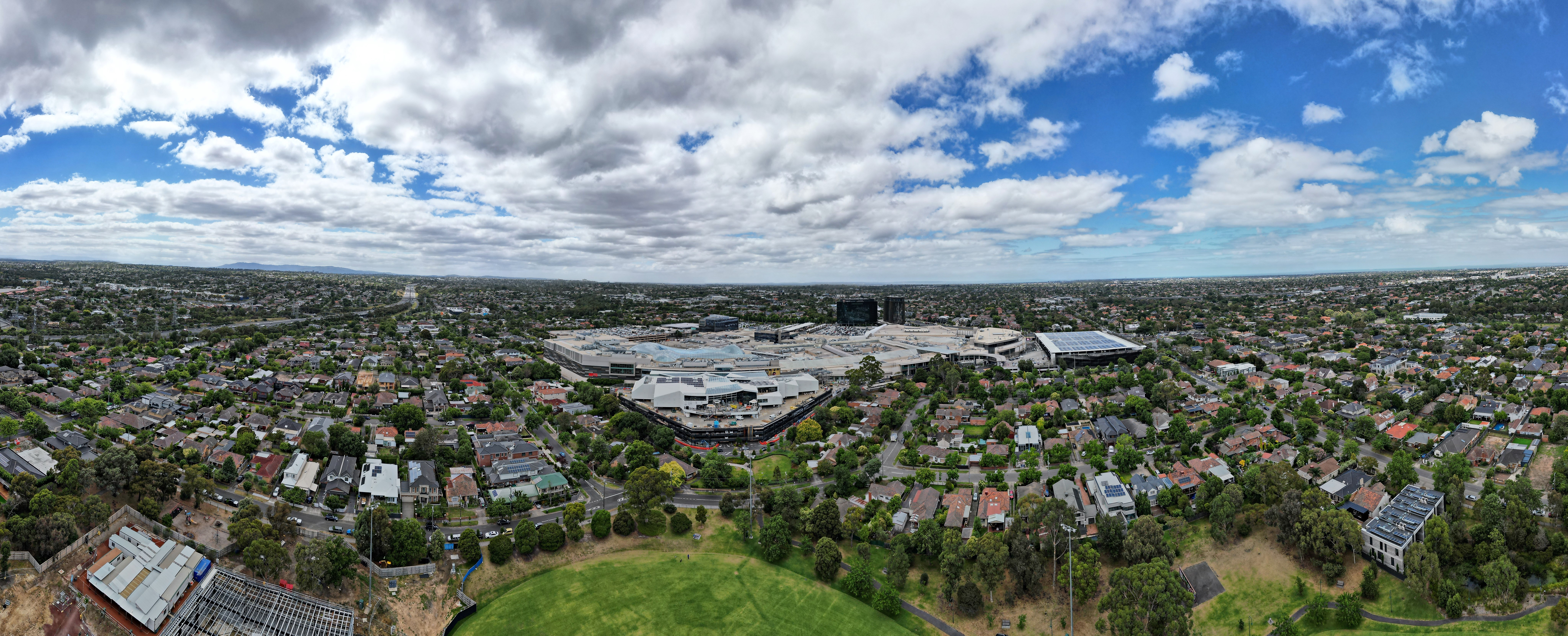
Aerial panorama of Chadstone Shopping Centre with the Dandenong Ranges on the horizon

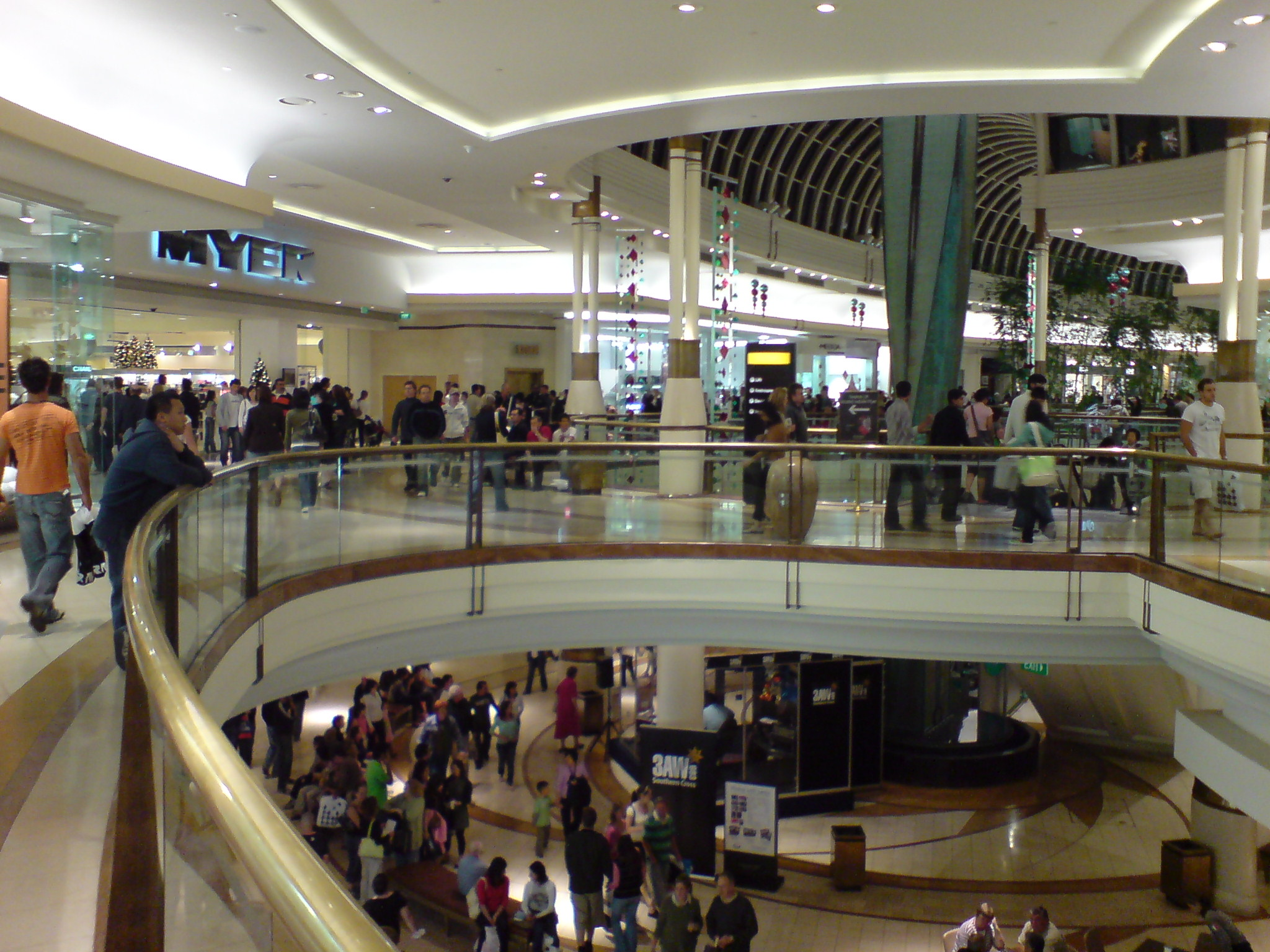
Ground level shops towards Myer

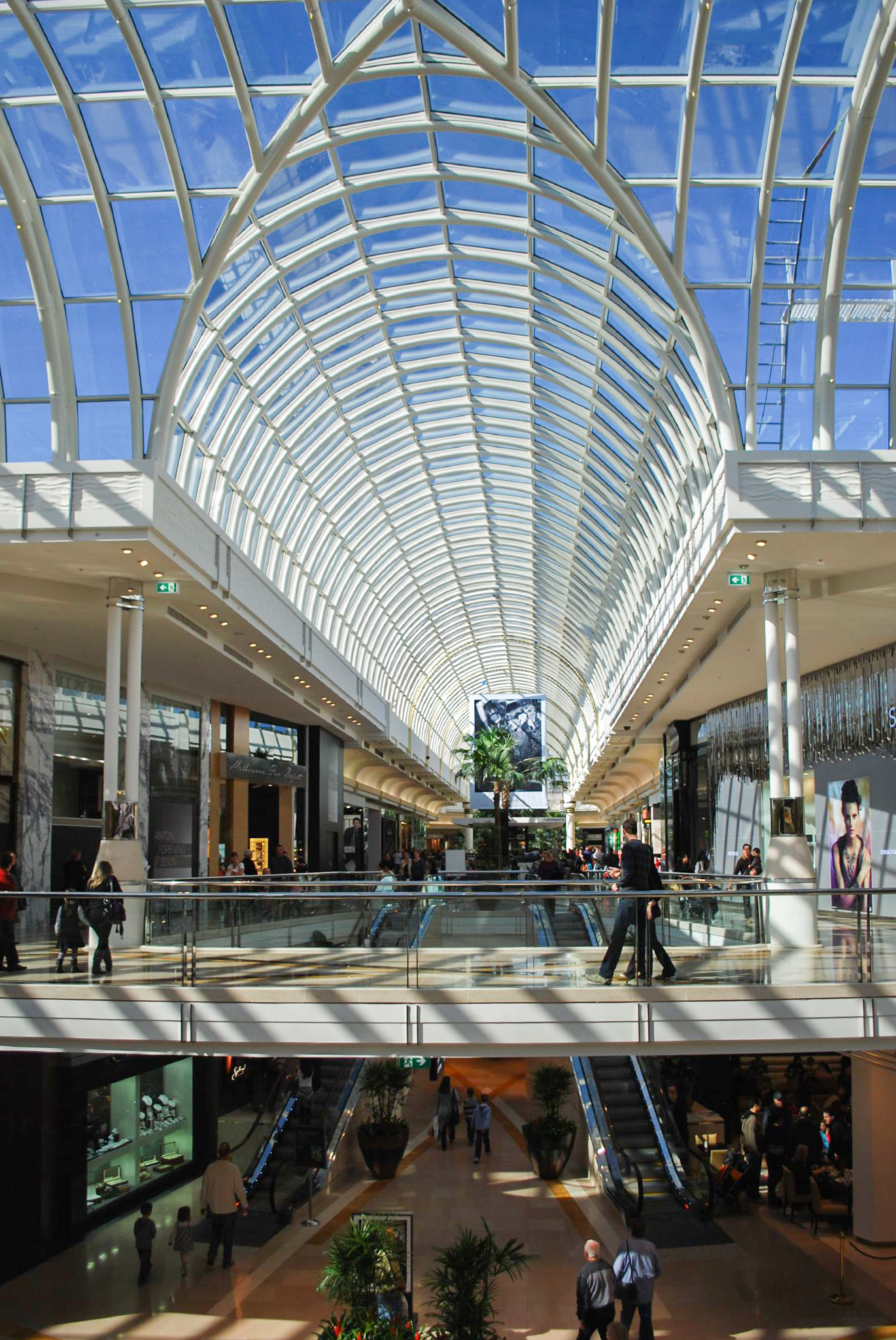
Western wing shops

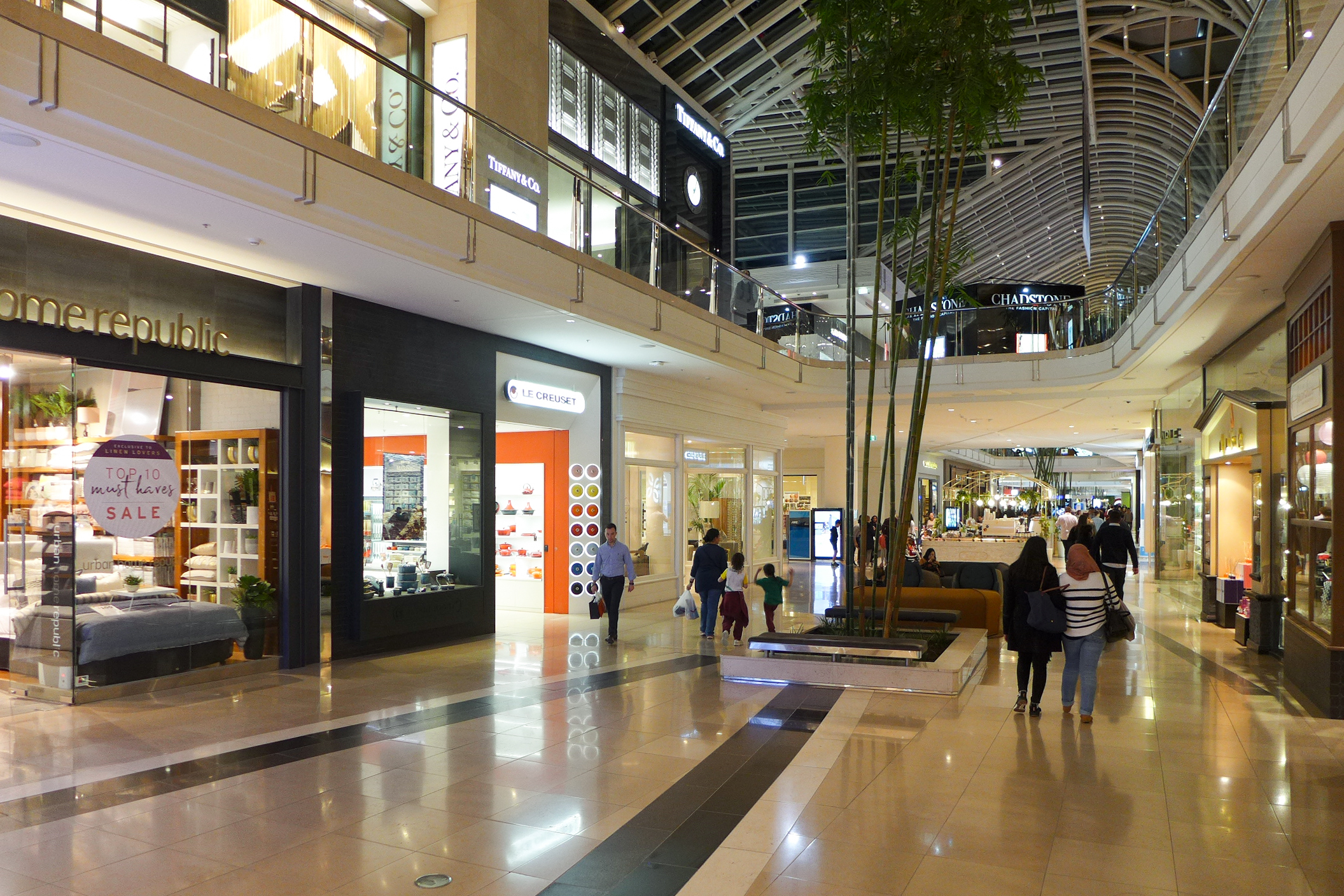
Lower Ground level shops

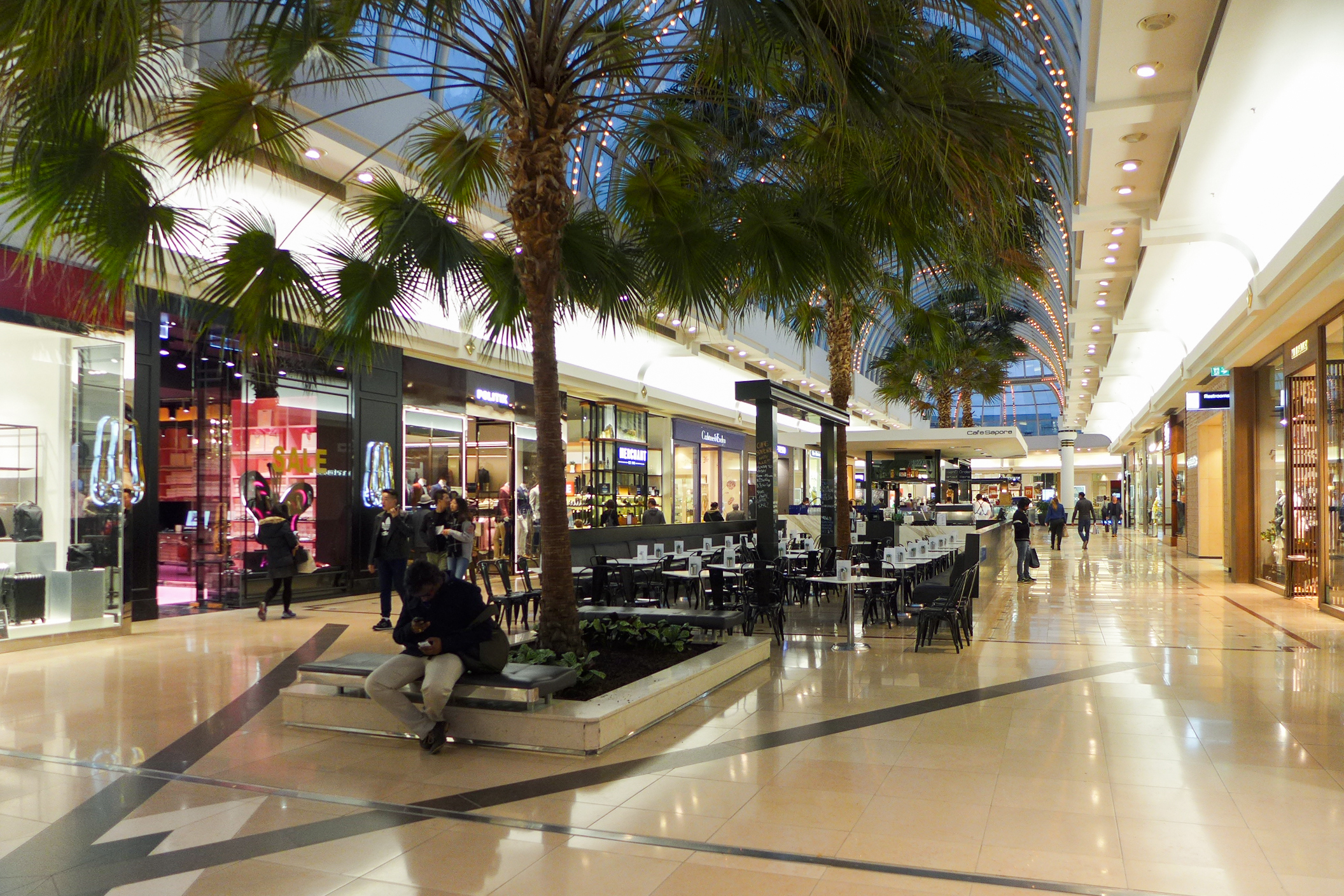
Ground Floor shops

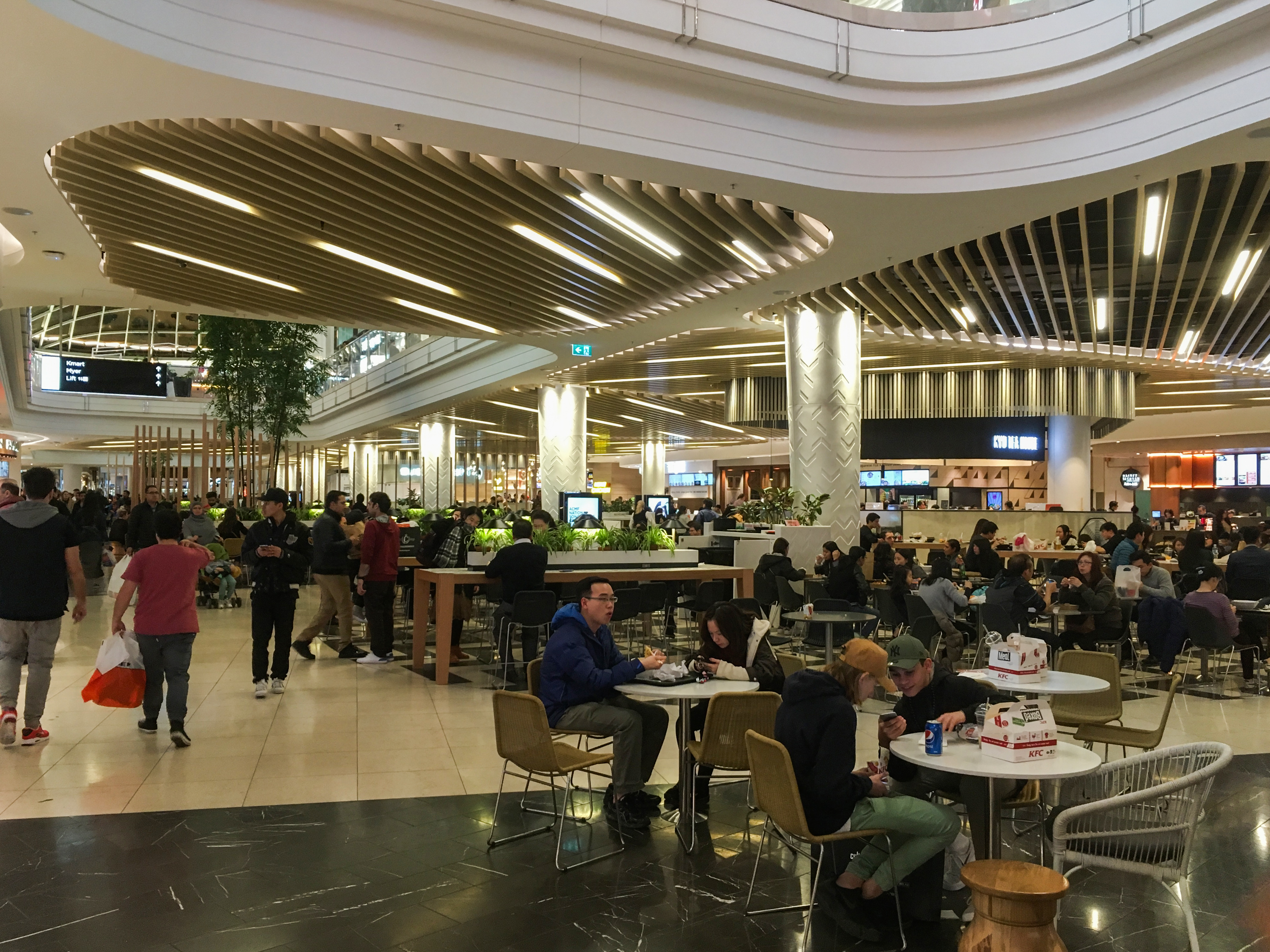
"Food Central" food court

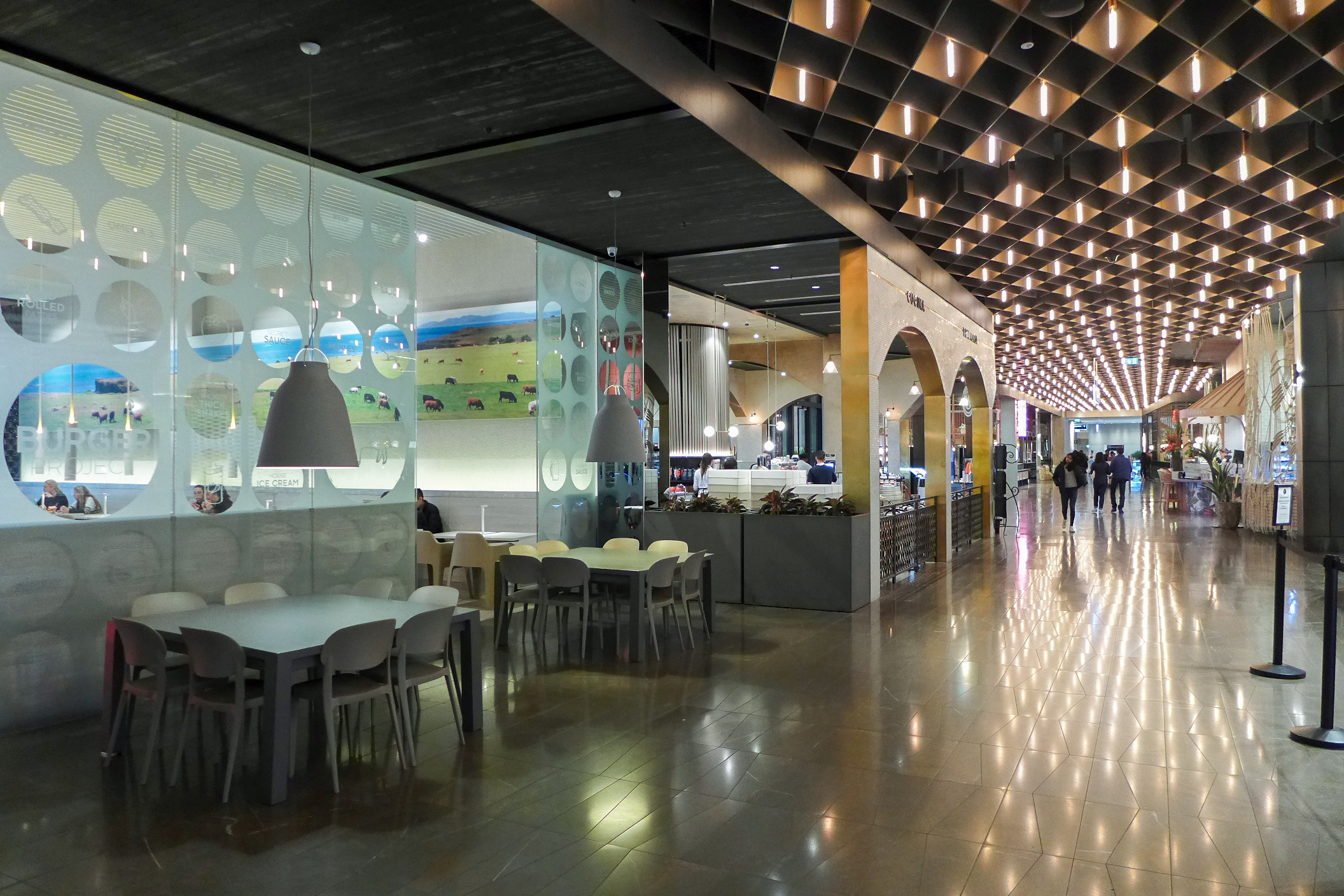
Level 1 restaurants

== See also ==
- List of shopping centres in Australia

== Notes ==
- Andrew Hutson (May 1999). ""Dream of Jeannie?" The American Origins of the Chadstone Shopping Centre" (PDF). Fabrications. Volume 9.
