= Pancake Parlour =

Australian restaurant chain

Coordinates: 37°48′43.01″S 144°58′04.86″E

- Type: Family business
- Industry: Restaurants
- Founded: 1965; 61 years ago
- Founders: Allen Trachsel; Helen Trachsel; Roger Meadmore
- Headquarters: Melbourne
- Number of locations: 13
- Area served: Victoria, Australia
- Key people: Simon Meadmore (CEO)
- Products: Pancakes, ice-cream, crepes, various savoury dishes
- Website: www.pancakeparlour.com

Pancake Parlour is an Australian pancake restaurant chain founded in 1965. It serves breakfast and dessert items, mainly various types of pancakes and crêpes. The Parlour owns 13 locations in Melbourne, where it is well-known, and has one licensee, the Pancake Kitchen, in Ballarat. Its restaurants feature the "Lovely!" Lady logo, whimsical Pythonesque imagery, and machine-like sculptures which were conceived by a steampunk artist. The Pancake Parlour shares a founder, Roger Meadmore, with several unaffiliated pancake restaurants around Australia.

== History ==
In 1959, Roger and Helen Meadmore, an Australian couple, and their long-time American business partner, Alan Trachsel, were on a road trip in the U.S. (Note: While their official company history says they were traveling from New York to Miami, a Vice article says they were going through Florida. Sources also differ on who was with Roger Meadmore. Vice said only Trachsel was with him, The Advertiser said only Helen was, and an article from Good Food, endorsed by the company, says that all three were present.) Every morning, they stopped for breakfast at pancake houses. The Australians would later recall, "Americans served pancakes the way we serve toast".

When they returned home, Roger Meadmore discarded his plans to start an omelette restaurant. He saved up for years to open up the Pancake Kitchen in 1965 with his wife and Trachsel. (Note: Although the official company history says it opened in 1965, Good Food claims it opened the previous year.) Located in a burned-out deli in Gilbert Place, Adelaide, the Pancake Kitchen's early days were unconventional. Instead of a menu, patrons were asked what they wanted. Their answer was "pancakes and a sort-of bolognese." That dish is still on the menu as the Tabriz. (Note: The Original Pancake Kitchen is still in operation today after being sold at least twice, the first time before 1969. The current owners, proprietor Mark Sandgren and his family, bought the restaurant in March 2017. It currently operates as a four-restaurant chain across South Australia unaffiliated with the Pancake Parlour.)

In 1969, they sold the Pancake Kitchen. Roger Meadmore moved to Sydney, leaving the company to pursue his career as a balloonist and, being a committed Scientologist, run his personal efficiency business. (Note: Meadmore started a company called Pancakes Australia and opened many unaffiliated restaurants across Sydney, Brisbane, and Perth. Some of those, such as Sydney's Pancakes on the Rocks and Brisbane's Pancake Manor, still exist.) Helen and Alan Trachsel, by then married, (Note: Sources differ on when Helen separated from Roger Meadmore and married Alan Trachsel. Vice claims that, when the three went into business together to start the Pancake Kitchen, Helen and Roger were already separated. Good Food said that Helen married Trachsel sometime after the road trip, while a 1990 article from the Australian Financial Review said that the Meadmores separated in the early 1980s. A 1979 article in The Age said that Helen and Trachsel were already married by then) and moved to Melbourne, where they started a now-defunct pancake restaurant at 4 Market Lane. As someone else had already registered the Pancake Kitchen name there, they called it the Pancake Parlour. In 1971, they built the portable Pancake Parlour Party Machine, which operated during the 1970s.

In the 1980s, 24-hour locations opened up in the suburb of Doncaster, and the Northland and Highpoint Shopping Centres. They significantly increased the Pancake Parlour's popularity as a family favourite.

Alan Trachsel died in 2006 and Helen died in 2016, but the Pancake Parlour is still owned by the Trachsel Family Trust. Helen's daughter, Samantha Meadmore, previously worked as the Group Training Manager, while her brother, Simon Meadmore, became CEO in 2003.

In 2018, Pancake Parlour employees, led by 21-year-old Tim Sarder, organised a successful legal action which gave them weekend and late-night penalty rates, using a closed Facebook group. Sarder told The Age that "the current contract [did] not meet the safety net of minimum wages or employment conditions". The Parlour did not oppose the application and was commended by United Voice, the relevant trade union.

== Description ==
Pancake Parlour serves a variety of breakfast meals and desserts, including pancakes and crêpes. It also sells its pancake mix and syrup in Australian supermarkets. The Parlour's original signature dish was the "short stack", two hotcakes with a selection of toppings. Its pancakes topped with ice cream, whipped butter, Bavarian apples, or berries were introduced soon after.

Pancake Parlour has thirteen locations in Melbourne, including in Australia's largest shopping centres, such as Chadstone, Westfield Fountain Gate, Eastland, and Highpoint. In addition, there is one licensee, the Pancake Kitchen, in Ballarat. Their proprietor is Vincent Lutjohn. Its restaurants incorporate the "Lovely!" Lady logo, whimsical, Pythonesque imagery, and machine-like sculptures which were originally designed by Peter Von Czarnecki, a friend of the founders, who later became a steampunk artist.

The early restaurants incorporated giant chess sets, and the Parlour sponsored and hosted many chess tournaments in the 1970s and 80s.

== Reception ==
According to The Age's Good Food, the Pancake Parlour is regarded as a Melbourne icon. Time Out included the restaurant in its list of the best pancakes in Melbourne, and said that it "has built a loyal following for its eclectic menu".

A few figures in the company are Scientologists or have been involved in the Church of Scientology, including the three co-founders and CEO Simon Meadmore. There is a persistent urban legend that the Pancake Parlour is a Scientologist front organization, which the company denies. In 2017, journalist Royce Kurmelovs, writing for Vice, described Pancake Parlour's current incarnation as a "garden variety, profit-maximising restaurant chain" and concluded that the rumours now are most likely false.

== See also ==
- List of pancake houses
