= Novion Property Group =

- Formerly: CFS Retail Property Trust; Gandel Retail Trust
- Traded as: ASX: NVN
- Industry: Property Management
- Founded: October 1994
- Founder: John Gandel
- Defunct: June 2015
- Headquarters: MLC Centre, Sydney, Australia
- Number of locations: 36 (2015)
- Net income: $400 million (2014)
- Website: www.novion.com.au

Novion was an Australian Real Estate Investment Trust which invested in shopping centres across Australia. It was listed on the Australian Securities Exchange in October 1994 by John Gandel under the name Gandel Retail Trust' with six retail assets.

== Management ==
Novion was managed by Colonial First State, based in Sydney, under the name CFS Retail Property Trust until 2013, when it separated. It was renamed Novion in November 2014. Novion merged with Federation Limited in June 2015, to become Vicinity Centres.

== Properties ==
As at June 2015, Novion owned had shareholdings in 36 shopping centres.

Australian Capital Territory

- 15 Bowes Street, Phillip

New South Wales

- Bathurst City Centre
- Chatswood Chase
- DFO Homebush
- Lake Haven Shopping Centre
- Lidcombe Shopping Centre

Victoria

- Altona Gate
- Bayside
- Broadmeadows Central
- Chadstone Shopping Centre
- Corio Shopping Centre
- DFO Essendon
- DFO Moorabbin
- DFO South Wharf (75%)
- Emporium Melbourne (50%)
- Forest Hill Chase
- Gateway Plaza, Leopold
- Myer Bourke Street (33%)
- Northland Shopping Centre (50%)
- Roxburgh Village

Queensland

- Clifford Gardens
- Grand Plaza Shopping Centre (50%)
- Uptown, Brisbane (50%)
- QueensPlaza
- Runaway Bay Shopping Village (50%)

South Australia

- Castle Plaza
- Elizabeth City Centre

Tasmania

- Eastlands Shopping Centre
- Northgate Shopping Centre

Western Australia

- Rockingham Centre
