= Northland Shopping Centre =

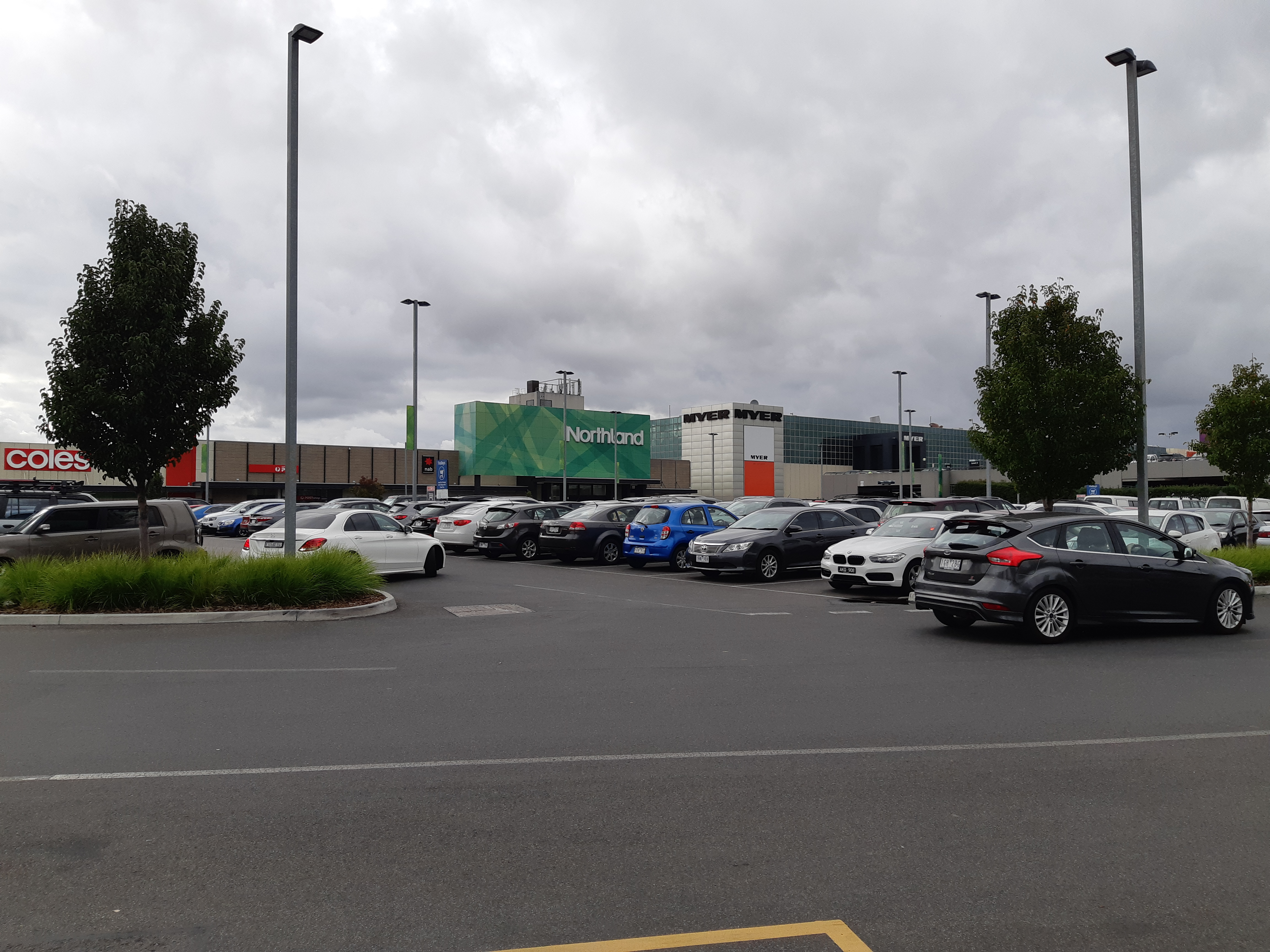
- Northland Shopping Centre in May 2019
- Location: Preston, Victoria, Australia
- Coordinates: 37°44′18″S 145°1′47″E
- Opened: 4 October 1966; 60 years ago
- Developer: Myer
- Manager: Vicinity Centres
- Owner: Vicinity Centres (50%); Nikos Property Group (50%)
- Num. of stores: 330
- Num. of anchor tenants: 9
- Floor area: 97,922 m^{2} (1,054,020 sq ft)
- Floors: 3
- Parking: 4800+ spots
- Website: northlandsc.com.au

Northland Shopping Centre is a major shopping centre in Preston, approximately 11 km north of the Melbourne central business district in Victoria, Australia. It is the largest predominantly single-level shopping centre in Melbourne. It has more than 330 stores on one floor, with the top floor containing just the Hoyts cinemas, Pancake Parlour and indoor golf venue X-Golf.

The centre is anchored by a Myer department store (4 levels), Target and Kmart department stores, Coles, Woolworths and Aldi supermarkets, as well as mini majors Best & Less, JB Hi-Fi, Rebel Sport, TK Maxx and Chemist Warehouse, and international retailers H&M, Uniqlo and Sephora.

== History ==
Opening on 4 October 1966, Northland Shopping Centre was one of the first self-contained shopping centres in Melbourne. The shopping centre was built and owned by Myer. The original shopping centre consisted of three malls radiating north, east and west from a centre stage area. It housed 73 tenants and six professional suites. Some of the original retailers included Myer, Coles New World Supermarket, Buckley & Nunn, McEwans, Woolworths Variety Store and Coles Variety Store. A feature of the shopping centre was the Northland Market located at the south-west end of the shopping centre.

In July 1983, the Myer Emporium sold the shopping centre to the Gandel Group of Companies. In June 2011, the CFS Retail Property Trust sold a 50% shareholding to CPP Investments. CPP sold this in March 2014 to the GPT Group. The other 50% passed to Vicinity Centres in June 2015 when it merged with the Novion Property Group. Nikos Property Group bought GPT's stake in 2025, as part of their takeovers of 4 Vicinity centres around the country.

In 2001, Northland was the setting for the film Mallboy.

In 2006, Northland Shopping Centre was one of seven buildings suspected of harbouring legionnaires' disease after an outbreak which killed one and infected seven others in the area. Subsequent investigation by the coroner – Dr Jane Hendtlass (Case No 729/06) confirmed that alleged buildings nearby did not contain the disease.

=== Incidents ===
- 17 December 1988 – A 28-year-old Preston man was taken to hospital after getting into an argument at Northland with an armed man, who shot him in the left thigh.
- 4 March 1992 – A police car chase occurred when an armed man in his 30s fled after robbing the Plenty Credit Cooperative in Bundoora. He opened fire on police with a sawn-off .22 long rifle from a stolen vehicle. After abandoning the first getaway car, the gunman, accompanied by another man and an 11-year-old boy, switched to a Ford Falcon station wagon and continued the escape. Police saw the vehicle near Reservoir and pursued it at high speed, during which the gunman fired several shots at police, hitting at least one unmarked police vehicle. The chase ended at Northland Shopping Centre, where the man ran into the complex, brandishing his weapon. Cornered in the centre’s car park the gunman shot himself in the chin and was later reported in stable condition at Austin Hospital. No police or civilians were injured during the incident, which authorities described as a near-miraculous outcome given the number of shots fired. Detective Inspector Peter Laidler and other officers praised the professionalism of the police involved. The second man and his son were detained and questioned over their involvement. The gunman was described by police as extremely violent and reckless, with the entire incident unfolding "like a scene from a movie".
- Mid-1996 – Between the months of June and July, a gang of thieves stole a total of six handbags from female customers. Senior Detective Chris Bence, of Preston police, said the gang used a car to stalk victims walking through the car park, before snatching women's handbags.
- 25 May 2025 – At about 2:30pm, a knife fight between rival gangs wielding machetes broke out in the food court of the shopping centre. Victoria Police stated that the incident was an act of planned retaliation by one of the gangs. A 20-year-old man was taken to hospital with serious head injuries. Two teenagers were arrested at the scene. By 26 May, another two men were arrested, with police searching for four other men. Police believed that a total of four machetes were used in the incident. Following the brawl's outbreak, calls were made to fast track an already-planned ban on machetes. In response, Victorian Premier Jacinta Allan banned the sale of machetes in Victoria from 28 May 2025. By that day, seven males had been arrested and charged over the violent incident. Police believe that all those involved have been arrested.
- 1 June 2025 – In the early hours of the day, alleged members of the National Socialist Network, a neo-Nazi organisation, staged a protest outside the shopping centre. They dressed in all black and concealed their faces with balaclavas while holding a banner saying "Ban Niggers, Not Machetes". Premier Allan condemned their actions, and police were investigating the incident.
- 18 June 2025 – A 27-year-old man drove a stolen Toyota Landcruiser through the shopping centre while evading police. No one was injured, and the man was later charged. One woman was treated at the scene for shock.
- 19 June 2025 – The shopping centre was evacuated for the second time within 24 hours after an electrical fire broke out at the Myer department store. One woman was treated at the scene for shock (not electrical).

== Gallery ==
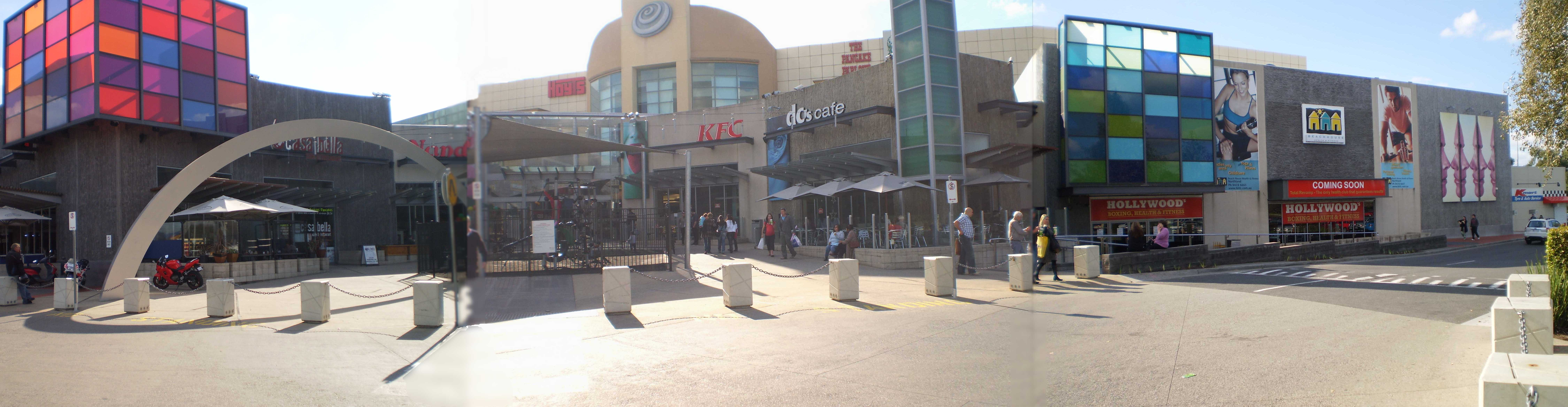
Panorama of the main entrance from Murray Road, 2009

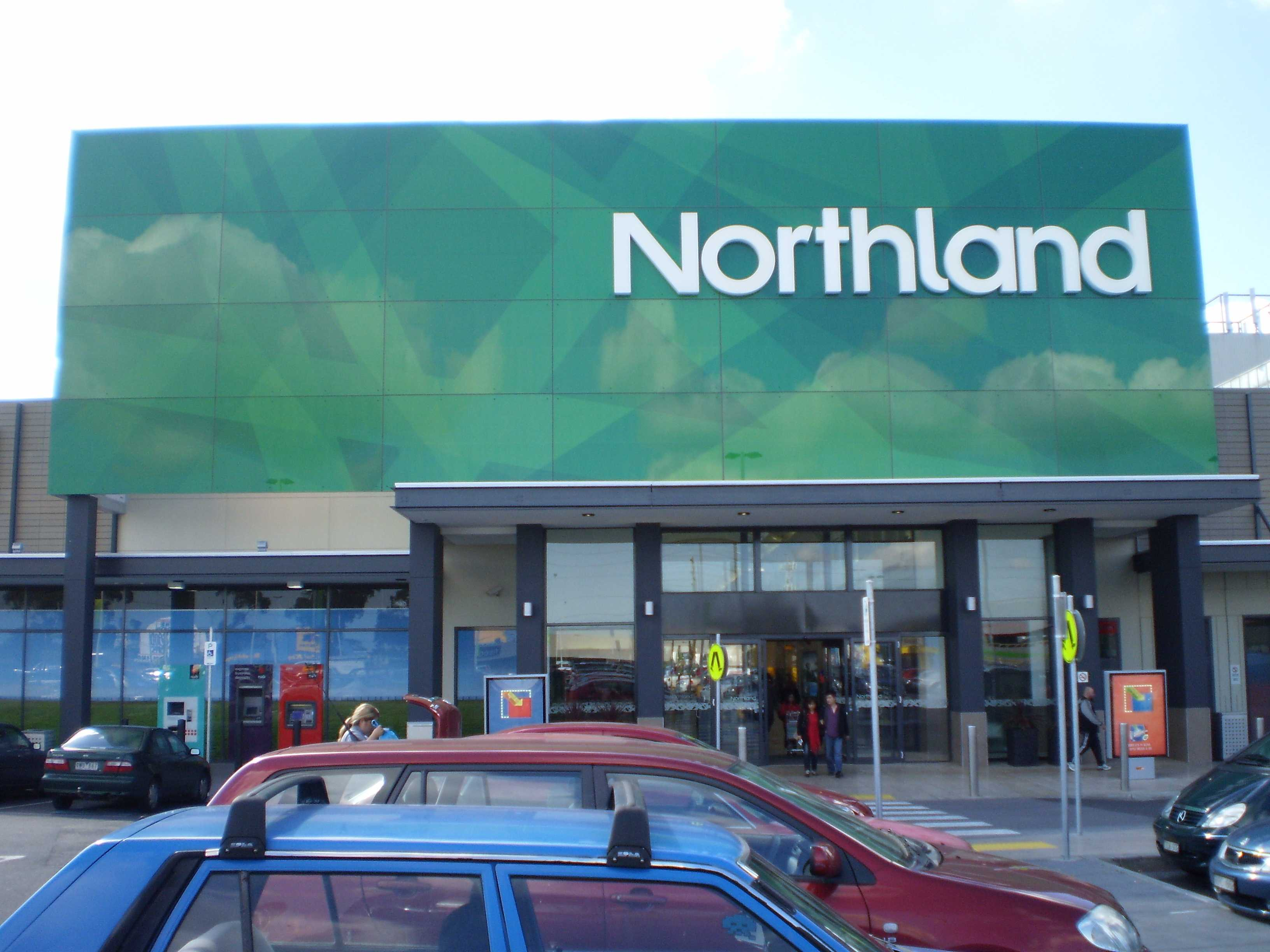
Secondary entrance from Murray Road, 2009

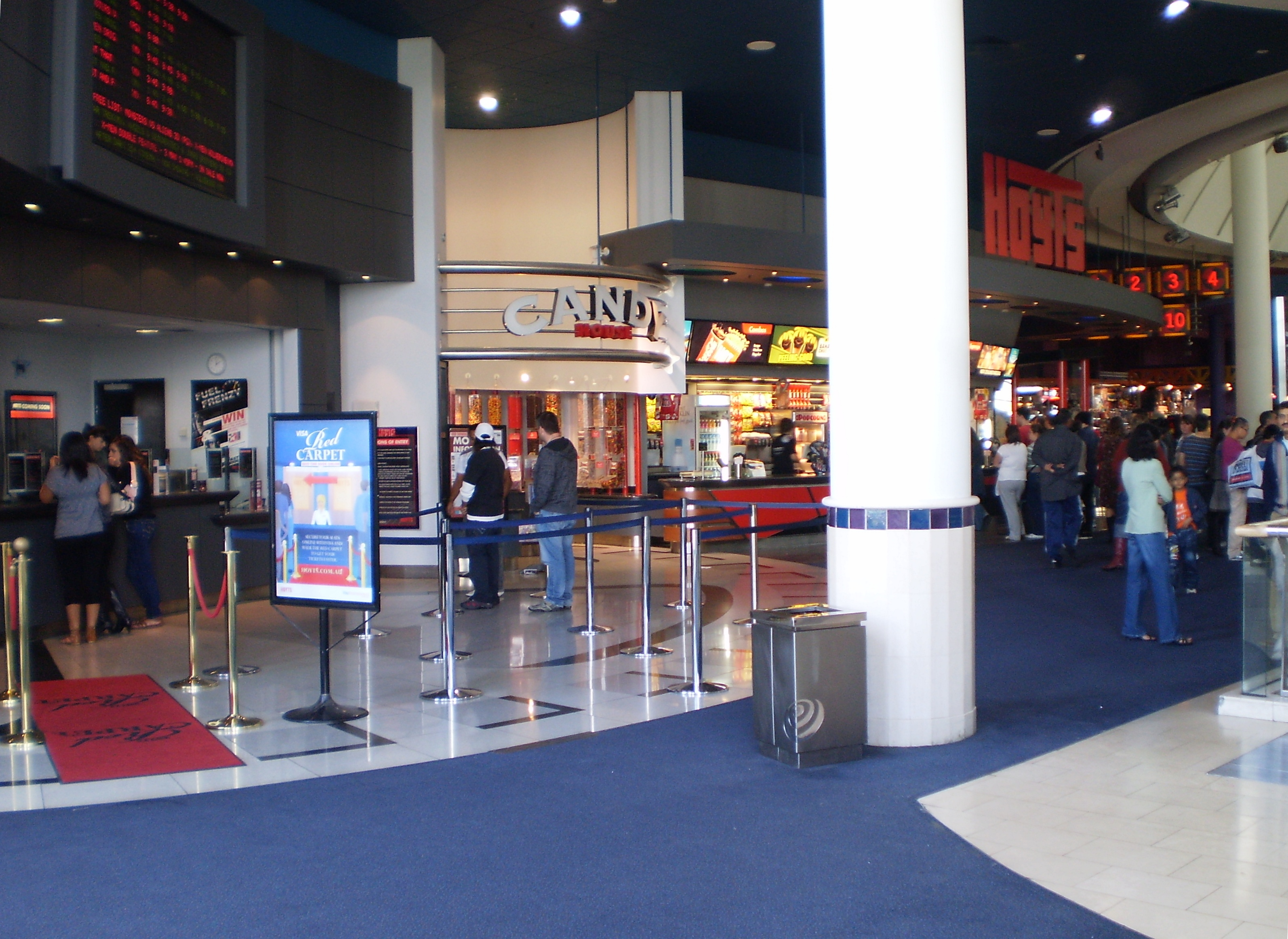
The Hoyts cinemas on the second floor, 2009

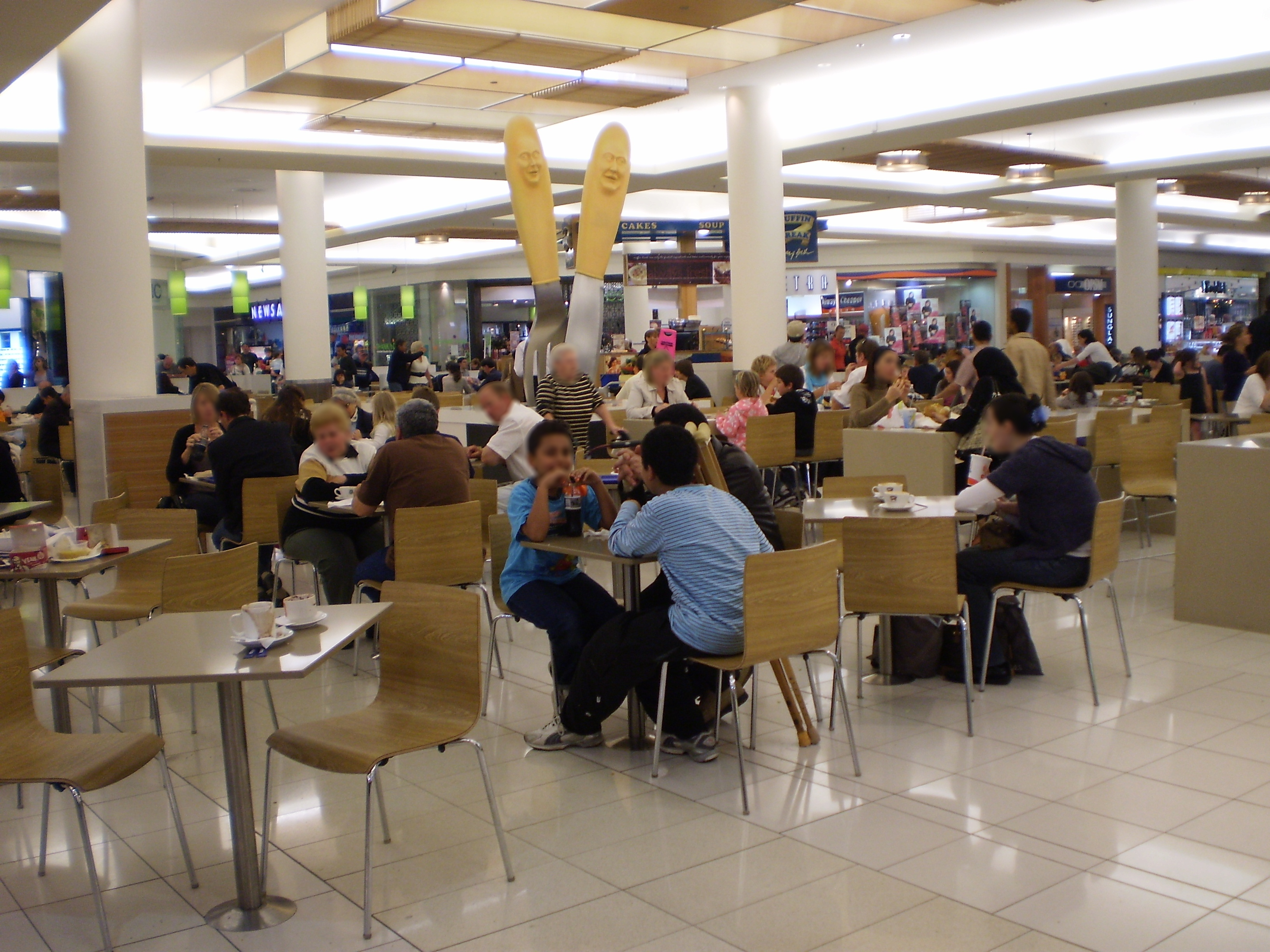
The main food court, 2009

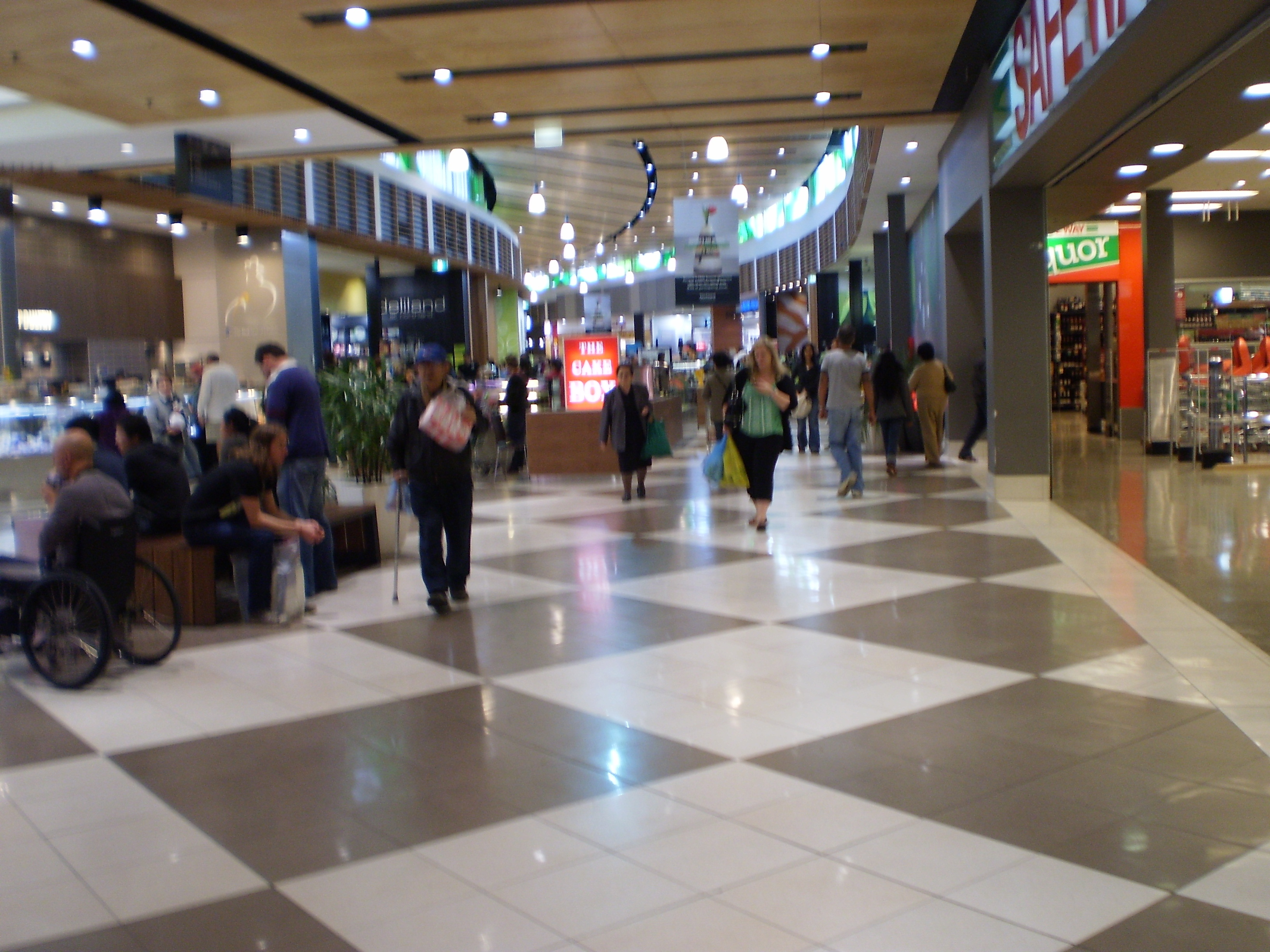
Outside a Safeway store, 2009. Since rebranded as Woolworths.

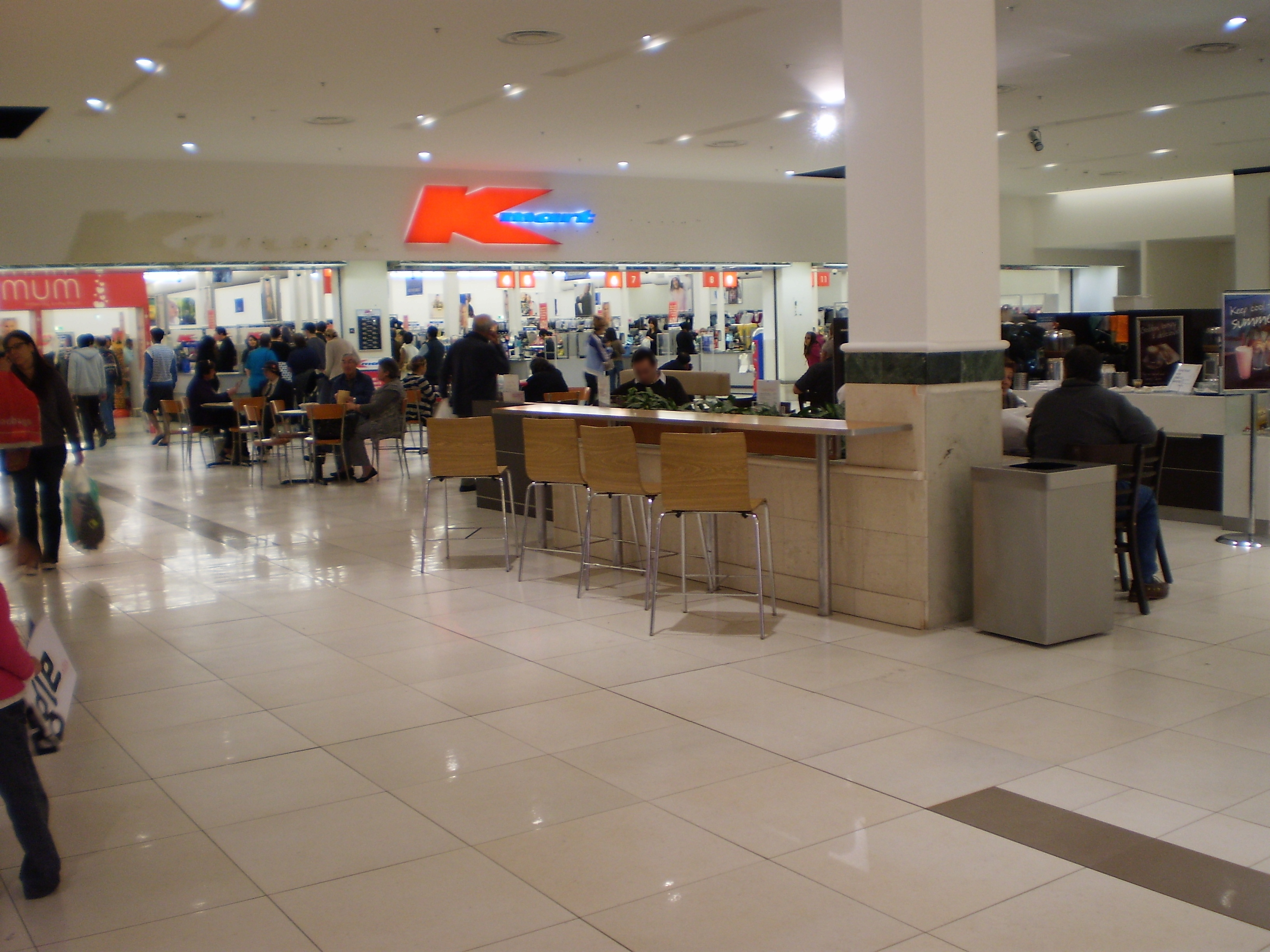
Kmart and surrounding stores, 2009

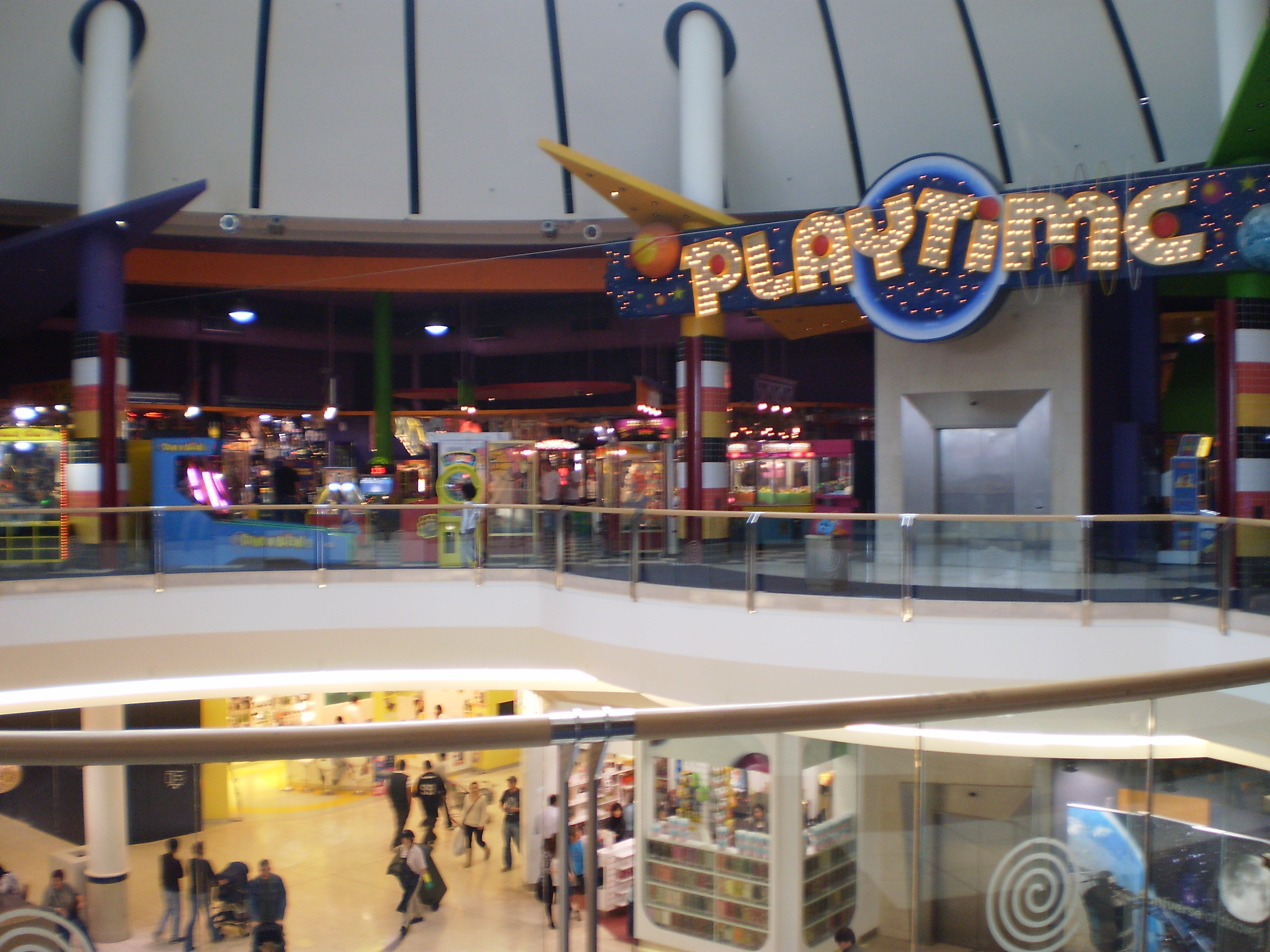
The Playtime Arcade, near the cinema, 2009. X-Golf is now in this location

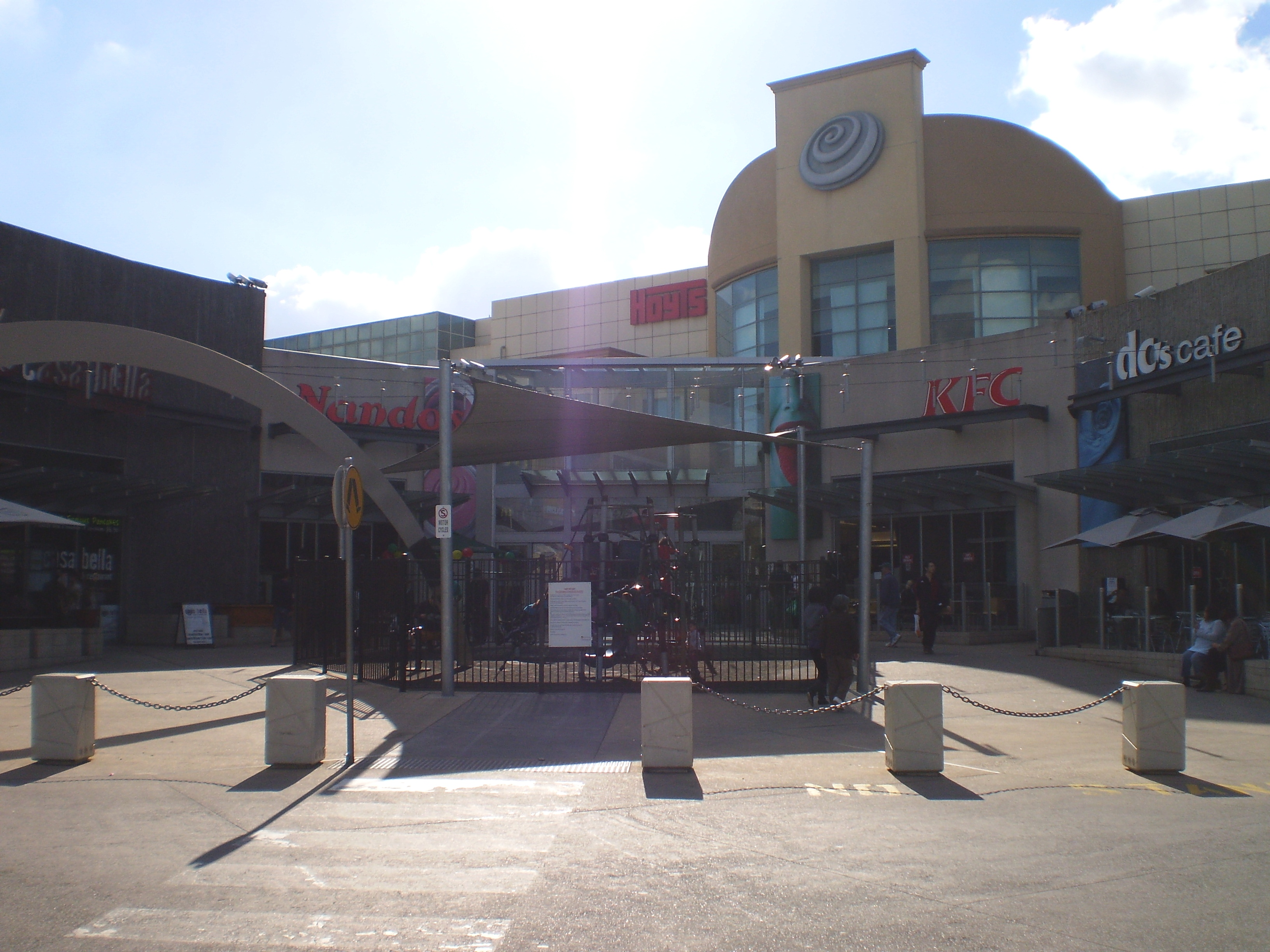
The main entrance from Murray Road, 2009

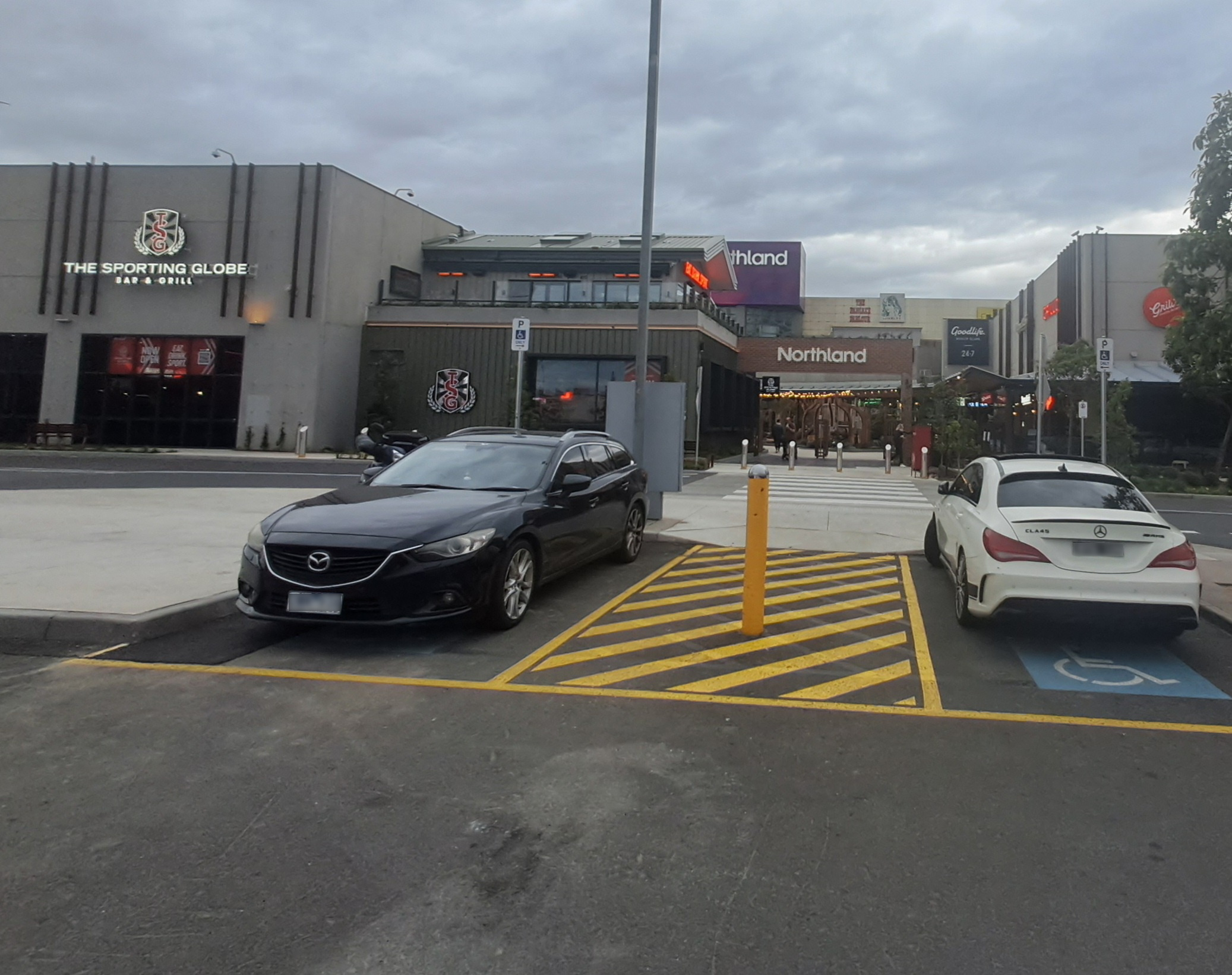
Exterior of entertainment precinct, August 2023 with extensions such as a playground and bar opened in June 2023

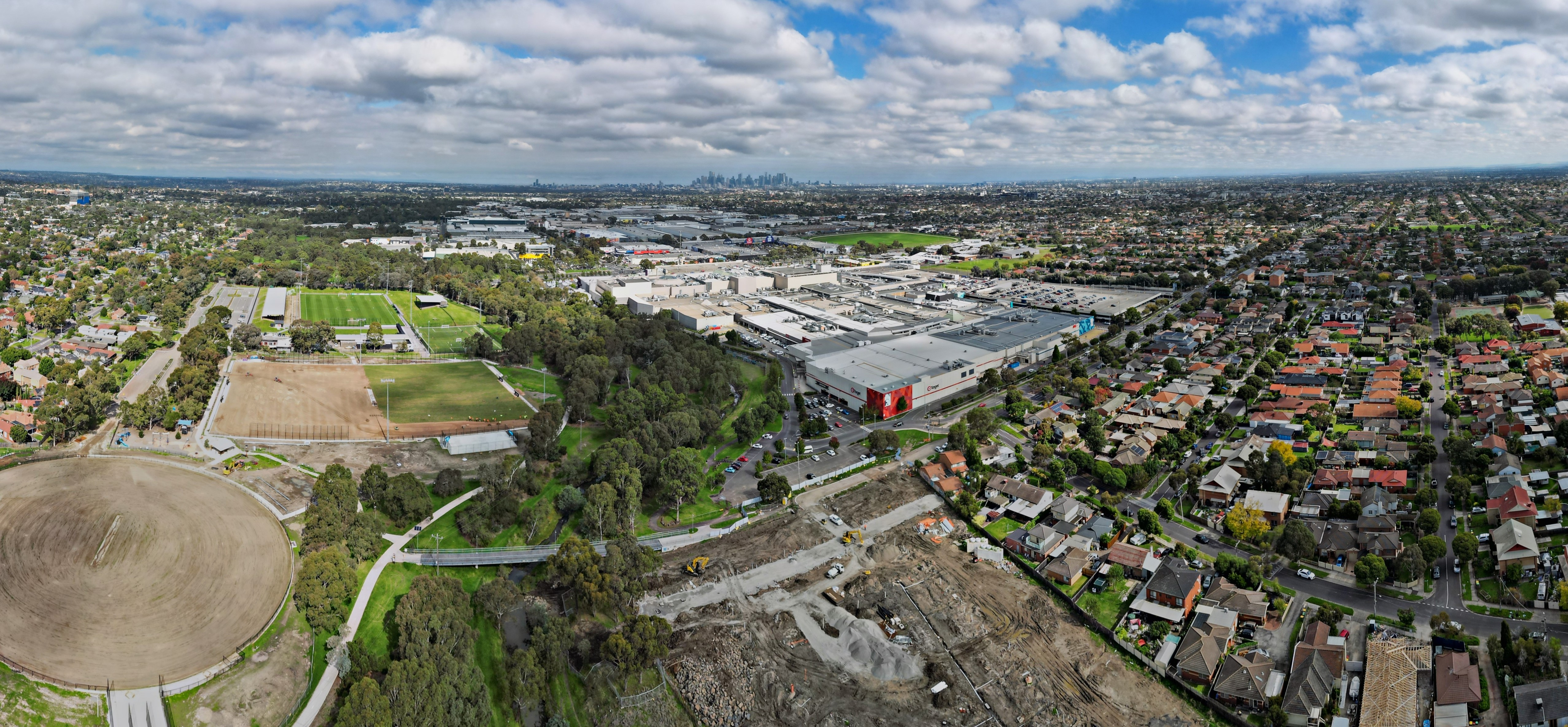
Aerial perspective of Northland Shopping Centre with the Melbourne CBD in the background and Olympic Village sporting grounds in April 2023

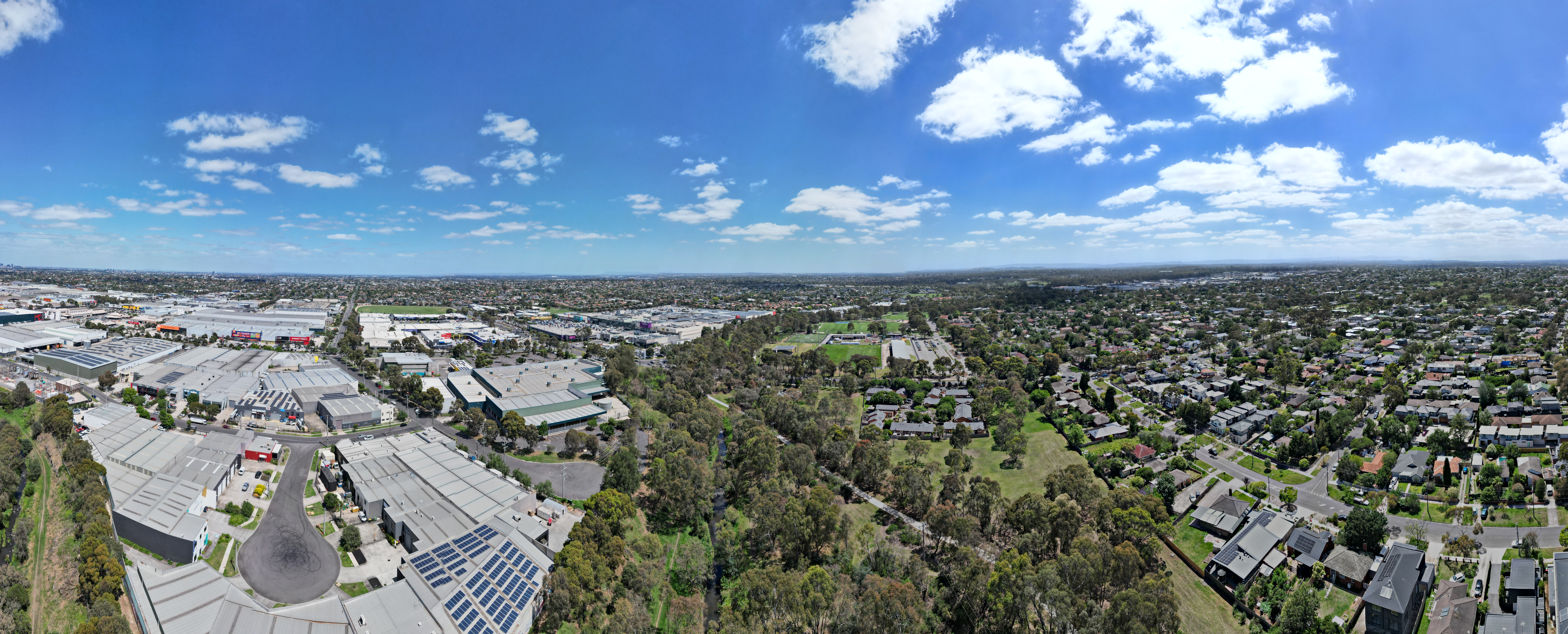
Darebin Creek, alongside Northland and its surrounds
