= Northgate Shopping Centre =

Shopping mall in Hobart, Tasmania, Australia

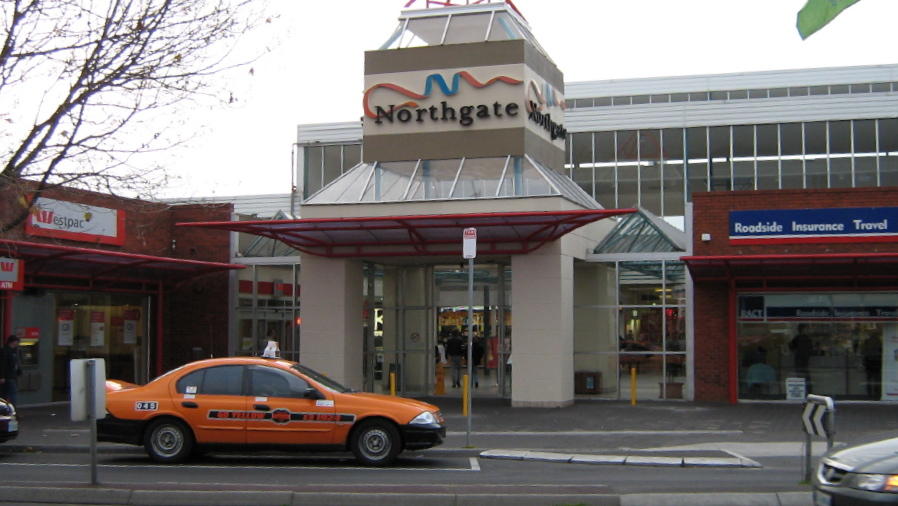
- The Main Northgate Entrance, prior to renovation and rebranding
- Location: Glenorchy, Tasmania, Australia
- Coordinates: 42°49′55″S 147°16′25″E
- Opened: 1986
- Owner: Vicinity Centres
- Num. of stores: 165
- Num. of anchor tenants: 3
- Floors: 1
- Website: www.northgatesc.com.au

Northgate Shopping Centre is the third largest shopping centre in Tasmania. Located in Glenorchy approximately 10 kilometres northwest of Hobart. The shopping centre is located on the Main Road within the CBD of Glenorchy with all stores located on the one level and a large undercover carpark situated below the main building. It was constructed on the site that had been that of the Glenorchy Tannery also known as Cook's Tannery.

The centre was opened in November 1986 as a convenience centre anchored by a Coles Supermarket along with 46 speciality stores. The centre has since been refurbished and expanded in October 1995. The shopping centre has had various calamities, in 2002 power cuts, and was involved in a fire in 2005. It had also been a property within the Westfield range of centres in Australia. Target and Best & Less to the centre as major anchor retailers were added in the early 2000s. There are also approximately 65 other speciality stores. As of 2009, the centre has been owned by Novion Property Group (CFSGAM) who merged into Vicinity Centres in 2015. In 2016, the centre introduced a freshly renovated main entrance, and rebranded the store to use Vicinity's ribbon as their logo. The anchoring Target department store closed permanently in early 2022. On 4 November 2022, a Woolworths supermarket was opened in the store space previously occupied by Target.

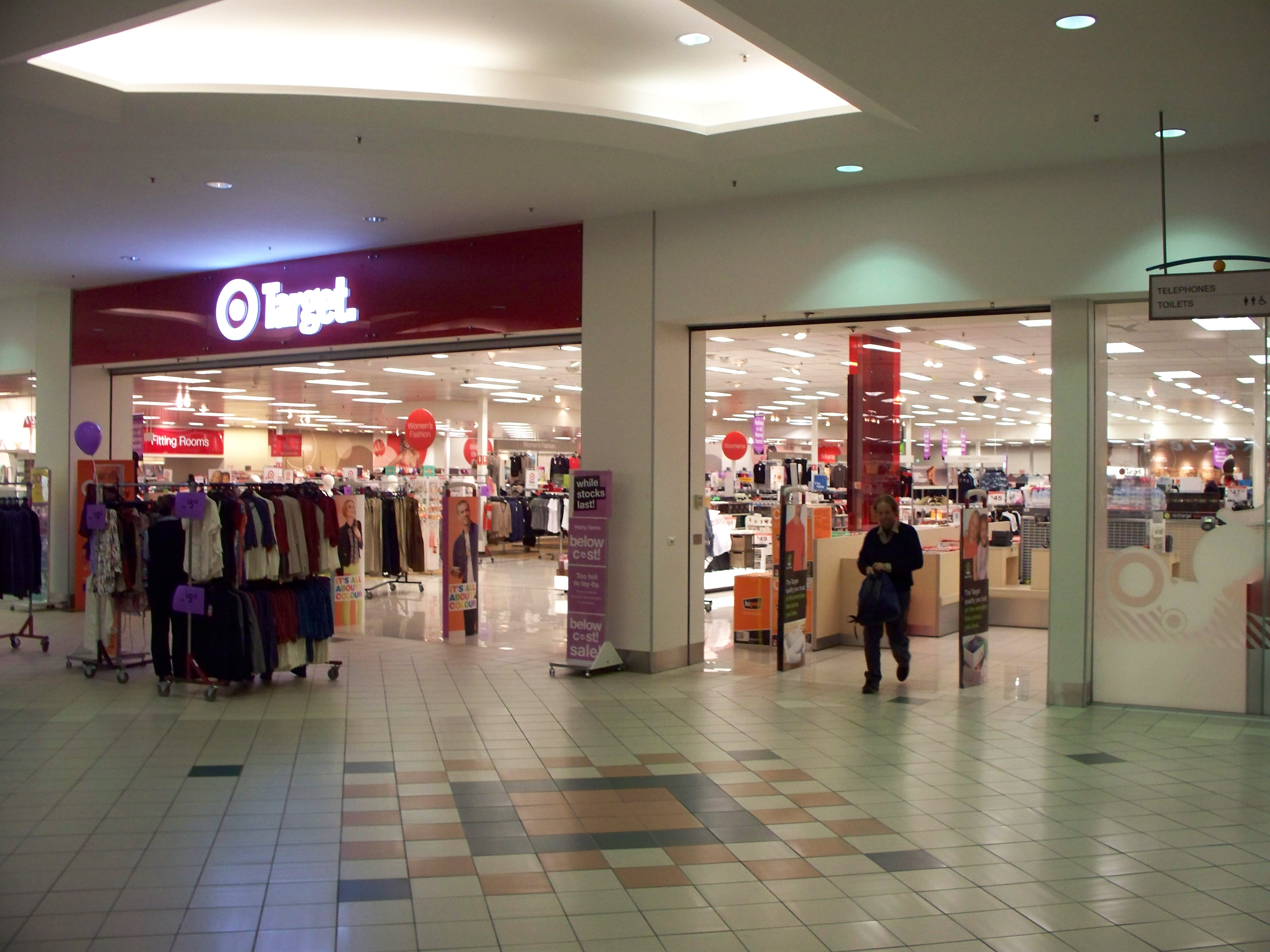
The Target department store in Northgate Shopping Centre pictured in 2012
