= Culture Kings =

Australian streetwear retailer

- Company type: Subsidiary
- Industry: Retail
- Founded: 2008
- Founders: Simon Beard; Tah-nee Beard
- Areas served: Australia; New Zealand; United States
- Products: Clothing and accessories
- Owner: a.k.a Brands
- Website: culturekings.com

Culture Kings is a streetwear clothing and accessories retailer established in 2008. Founded in Gold Coast, Australia by Simon and Tah-nee Beard, Culture Kings has 8 storefronts open in Australia, as well as one storefront in Auckland, New Zealand.

== History ==
Prior to Culture Kings' founding, co-founder Simon Beard re-sold shoes and hats on eBay under the name 'Culture Kings'. Beard, with wife Tah-nee, founded Culture Kings in 2008 and opened the first Culture Kings store in Southport, a suburb of Gold Coast.

On 8 January 2017, Culture Kings' Acacia Ridge warehouse was destroyed in a fire, resulting in the loss of $500,000 worth of products.

As of 2021, Culture Kings has 8 stores open in Australia and New Zealand, with 2 stores in Melbourne, and Sydney, and one store each in Brisbane, Perth, Gold Coast, and Auckland. Culture Kings original Southport store was closed in 2018.

In March 2021, the founders of Culture Kings sold the company to Boston-based Summit Partners' a.k.a Brands for $307.4 million in cash and 23.3 million shares in a.k.a Brands. Simon Beard remained CEO of Culture Kings while Tah-nee Beard was its COO.

On 24 July 2021, Culture Kings opened its first storefront outside of Australia in Auckland, New Zealand. In November 2022, Culture Kings opened their first U.S. store in Las Vegas. In January 2023, Simon and Tah-nee Beard left their executive roles at Culture Kings. Simon remained on a.k.a's board, and both stayed on as advisers to Culture Kings.

In 2022, Culture Kings received a Queensland Business Leaders Hall of Fame Award.

In October 2023, CreditRiskMonitor reported that Culture Kings' parent A.K.A. Brands was nearing a potential Chapter 11 bankruptcy filing.

== Collaborations ==
As of 2021, Culture Kings has collaborated with Champion, Timberland, Odd Future, Kappa, and G-Shock.

== Controversies ==
=== Hosier Lane ===
In 2018, Culture Kings opened its Melbourne storefront in Hosier Lane; an important site in Melbourne street art due to its history and perceived 'free-for-all' status. After its opening, Culture Kings created various murals and began enforcing street art usage within the lane, which went against the lanes previous 'free-for-all' status. This culminated in the destruction of artwork in the lane by masked men, whom sprayed the lane with fire extinguishers. In an interview with The Age, one of the perpetrators stated this was done to protest the commercialisation of the lane by Culture Kings, as well as by the Melbourne City Council.

=== Mike Tyson lawsuit ===
In 2021, boxer Mike Tyson lodged a civil case against Culture Kings for allegedly using his image and name in products without permission. The products in question feature Tyson's image with text including "Mike Tyson", which has been trademarked by Tyson since 2010.
