= The Original Pancake Kitchen =

Australian restaurant franchise

The Original Pancake Kitchen (often referred to as PK's) is a restaurant franchise in Adelaide, South Australia, known for serving American-style pancakes and breakfast dishes, established in 1965 on Gilbert Place in the Adelaide central business district.

== History ==
The restaurant opened in 1965 under the name The Pancake Kitchen, which served throughout the day and night.

In December 2022, it was reported that two of the five Original Pancake Kitchen locations – in Reynella and Port Adelaide – had closed following a serious kitchen fire at the Reynella site and broader economic pressures. The closures were managed by Oracle Insolvency Services, while the Gilbert Place, Marion, and Modbury outlets remained open.

=== Expansion ===
In mid-2025, Glam Adelaide announced that a new Original Pancake Kitchen venue would open in the north-eastern suburb of Golden Grove in late August.

In early 2025, The Advertiser reported that journalist Mitchell Sariovski and his partner Lauren Bent had purchased the Gilbert Place venue, announcing plans for renovations and a refreshed menu while retaining the restaurant's heritage and signature dishes.

== Locations ==
As of 2025, The Original Pancake Kitchen operates at:

- Gilbert Place, Adelaide CBD
- Modbury
- Marion
- Golden Grove (opening late August 2025)

== See also ==
- List of restaurants in Australia
